= 1992 United States House of Representatives elections =

House elections for the 103rd U.S. Congress

- November 3, 1992

All 435 seats in the United States House of Representatives 218 seats needed for a majority
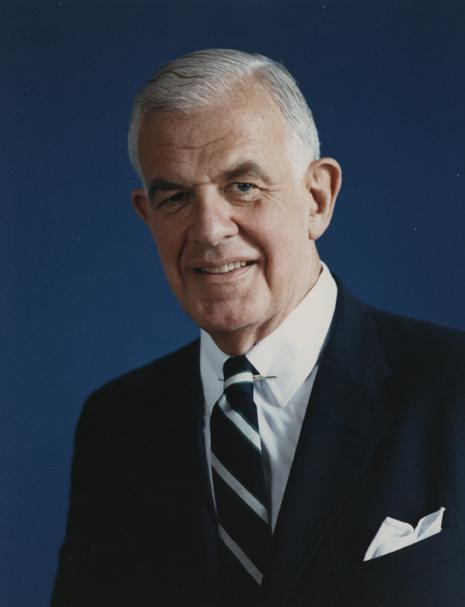

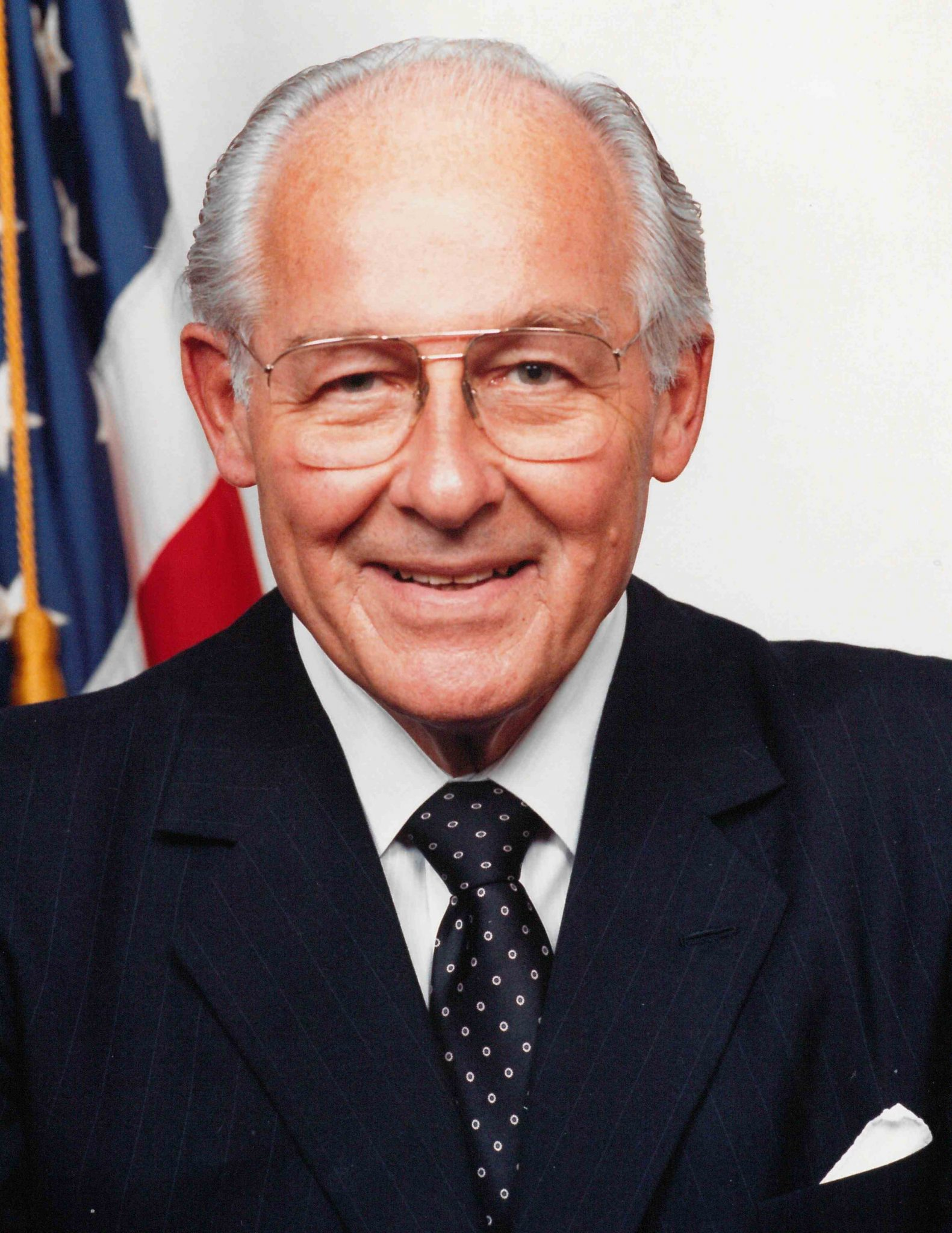
	Majority party	Minority party
Leader	Tom Foley	Bob Michel
Party	Democratic	Republican
Leader since	June 6, 1989	January 3, 1981
Leader's seat	Washington 5th	Illinois 18th
Last election	267 seats	167 seats
Seats won	258	176
Seat change	▼9	▲9
Popular vote	48,654,189	43,812,063
Percentage	50.1%	45.1%
Swing	▼2.0pp	▲0.8pp
	Third party
Party	Independent
Last election	1 seat
Seats won	1
Seat change	Steady
Popular vote	1,255,726
Percentage	1.3%
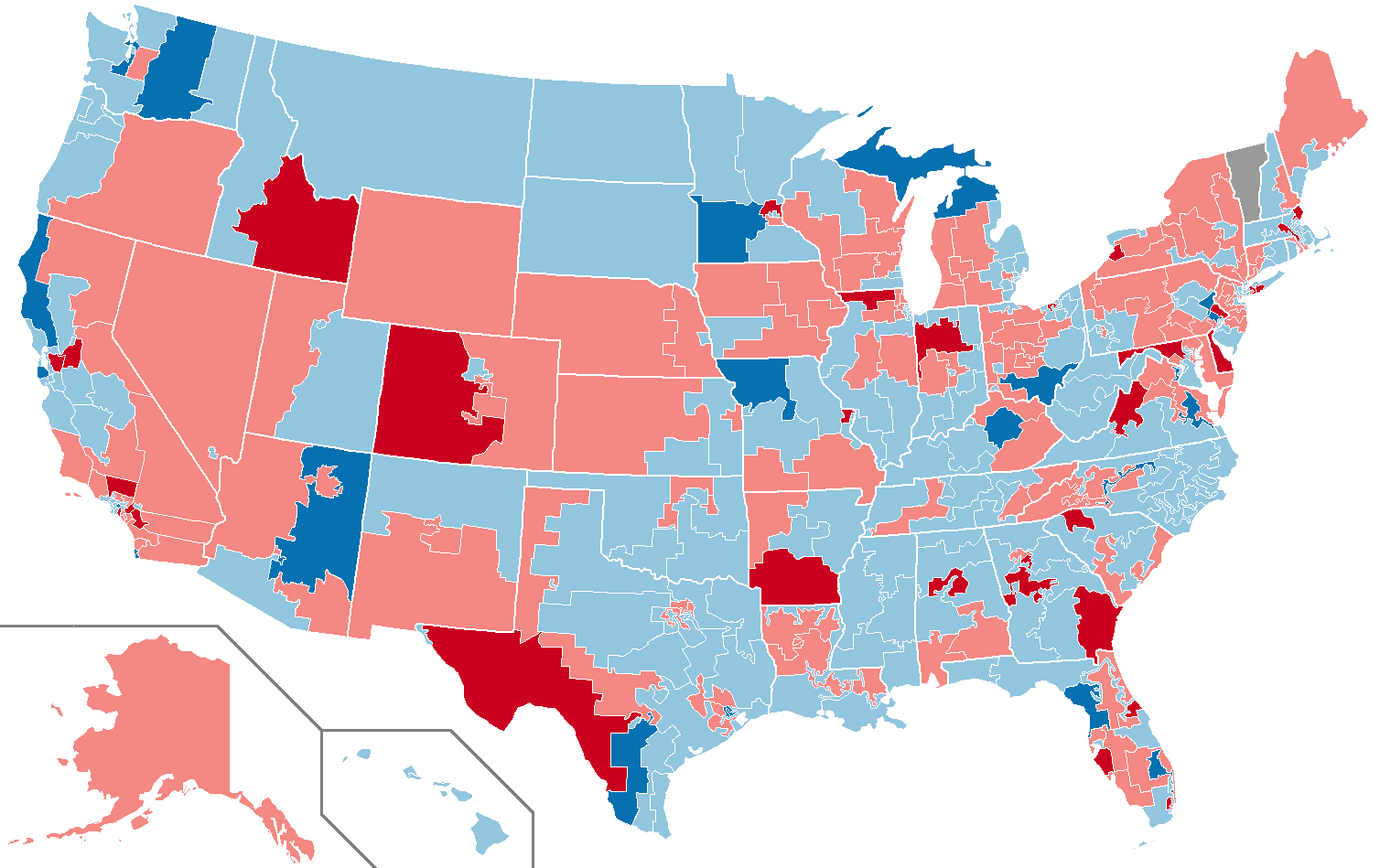
- Results: Democratic hold Democratic gain Republican hold Republican gain Independent hold
Speaker before election
Tom Foley
Democratic
Elected Speaker
Tom Foley
Democratic

The 1992 United States House of Representatives elections were held on November 3, 1992, to elect U.S. Representatives to serve in the 103rd United States Congress. They coincided with the 1992 presidential election, in which Democrat Bill Clinton was elected president, defeating Republican incumbent President George H. W. Bush.

Despite this, however, the Democrats lost a net of nine seats in the House to the Republicans, in part due to redistricting following the 1990 census. This election was the first to use districts drawn up during the 1990 United States redistricting cycle on the basis of the 1990 census. The redrawn districts were notable for the increase in majority-minority districts, drawn as mandated by the Voting Rights Act. The 1980 census resulted in 17 majority-black districts and 10 majority-Hispanic districts, but 32 and 19 such districts, respectively, were drawn after 1990.

This was the first time ever that the victorious presidential party lost seats in the House in two consecutive elections. As of 2026, this is the last congressional election in which Republicans won a House seat in Rhode Island, and the last time the Democrats won the House for more than two consecutive elections.

== Overall results ==
368 incumbent members sought reelection, but 20 were defeated in primaries and 23 defeated in the general election for a total of 325 incumbents winning. 46 representatives involved in the House banking scandal had over 100 overdrafts. 12 did not seek reelection, 8 were defeated in primaries, and 5 were defeated in the general election.

↓
258	1	176
Democratic	(Note: There was one Independent.)	Republican

Party	Seats			Share	Popular vote	
Party	Last election (1990)	This election	Net change	Share	Popular vote	
Democratic Party	267	258	▼9	59.3%	50.1%	48,654,189
Republican Party	167	176	▲9	40.5%	45.1%	43,812,063
Independent	1	1	Steady	0.2%	1.3%	1,255,726
Libertarian Party	0	0	Steady	0.0%	0.9%	848,614
Peace and Freedom Party	0	0	Steady	0.0%	0.3%	267,827
Green Party	0	0	Steady	0.0%	0.1%	134,072
Natural Law Party	0	0	Steady	0.0%	0.1%	100,782
Right to Life Party	0	0	Steady	0.0%	0.1%	93,452
Conservative Party	0	0	Steady	0.0%	0.1%	74,387
A Connecticut Party	0	0	Steady	0.0%	0.1%	65,701
Others	0	0	Steady	0.0%	1.9%	1,891,503
Totals	435	435	Steady	100.0%	100.0%	97,198,316

Source: Election Statistics - Office of the Clerk

Popular vote
Democratic	50.06%
Republican	45.07%
Libertarian	0.87%
Others	4.00%

House seats
Democratic	59.31%
Republican	40.46%
Others	0.23%

=== Maps ===
Popular vote and seats total by states

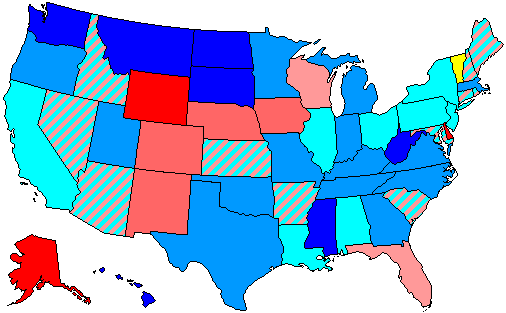
House seats by party holding plurality in state
80+% Democratic 80+% Republican
60+ to 80% Democratic 60+ to 80% Republican
Up to 60% Democratic Up to 60% Republican
striped: 50–50 split
1 independent

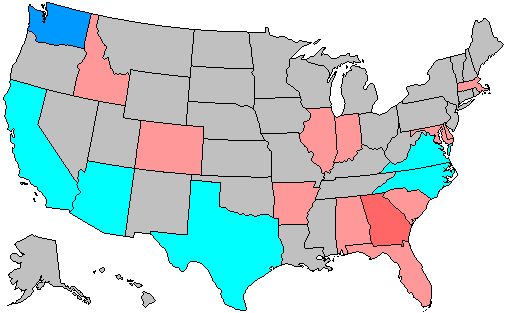
Change in seats
6+ Democratic gain 6+ Republican gain
3-5 Democratic gain 3-5 Republican gain
1-2 Democratic gain 1-2 Republican gain
no net change

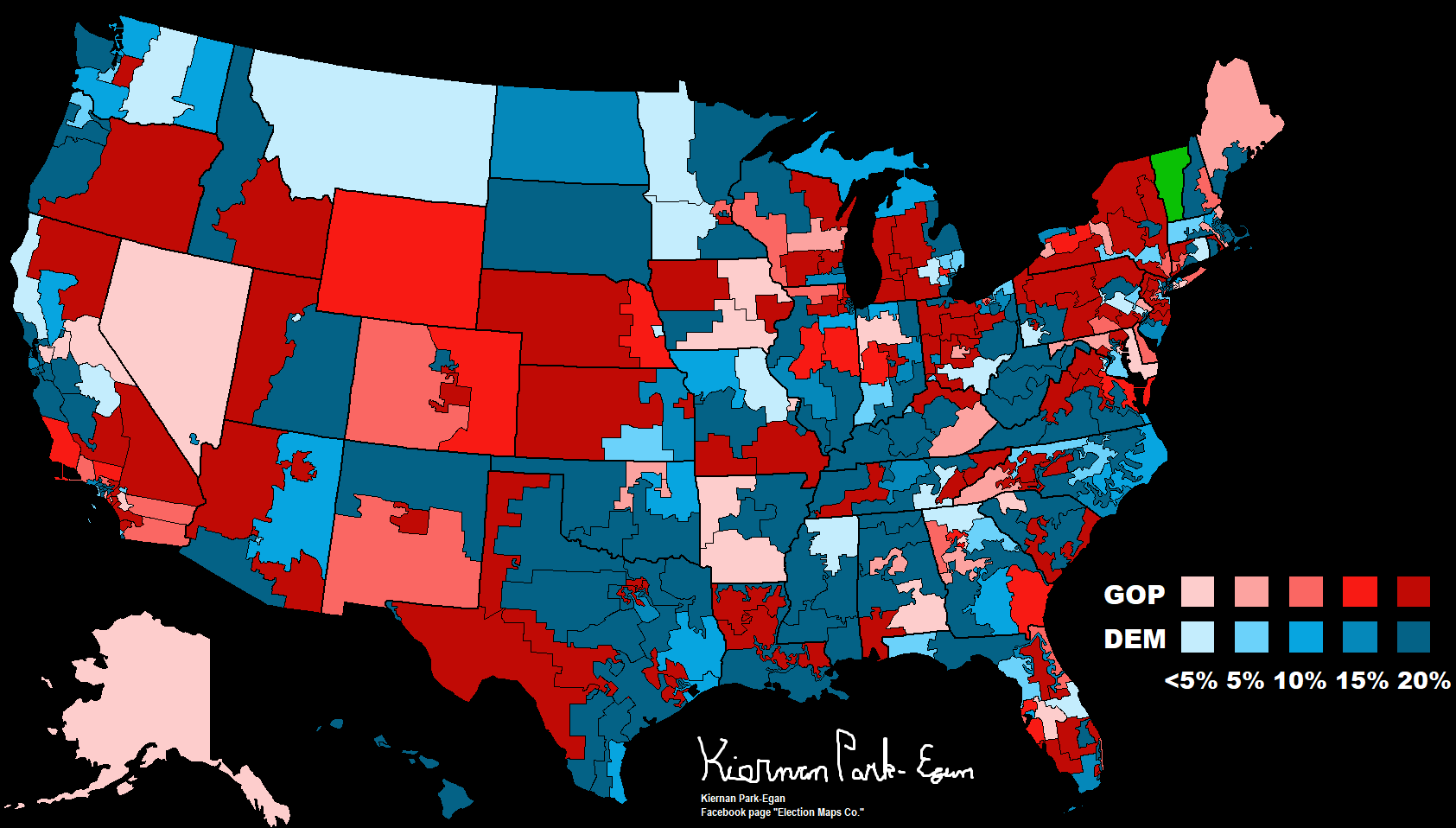
Margin of victory in each congressional district

== Retiring incumbents ==
65 members did not seek re-election: 41 Democrats and 24 Republicans. This was the most House retirements in a single election cycle in history.

=== Democrats ===
1. Alabama 7: Claude Harris Jr. retired.
2. California 6: Barbara Boxer retired to run for U.S. Senator.
3. California 30: Edward R. Roybal retired.
4. California 36: Mel Levine retired to run for U.S. Senator.
5. California 37: Mervyn Dymally retired.
6. California 38: Glenn M. Anderson retired.
7. Colorado 3: Ben Nighthorse Campbell retired to run for U.S. Senator.
8. Delaware at-large: Tom Carper retired to run for governor.
9. Florida 3: Charles E. Bennett retired.
10. Florida 16: Lawrence J. Smith retired.
11. Florida 17: William Lehman retired.
12. Florida 19: Dante Fascell retired.
13. Georgia 1: Lindsay Thomas retired.
14. Georgia 9: Ed Jenkins retired.
15. Georgia 10: Doug Barnard Jr. retired.
16. Idaho 2: Richard H. Stallings retired to run for U.S. Senator.
17. Illinois 5: Frank Annunzio retired.
18. Kentucky 7: Chris Perkins retired.
19. Massachusetts 9: Brian J. Donnelly retired.
20. Michigan 5: J. Bob Traxler retired.
21. Michigan 8: Howard Wolpe retired.
22. Michigan 12: Dennis Hertel retired.
23. New Jersey 6: Bernard J. Dwyer retired.
24. New Jersey 8: Robert A. Roe retired
25. New Jersey 14: Frank J. Guarini retired.
26. New York 3: Robert J. Mrazek retired to run for U.S. Senator.
27. New York 8: James H. Scheuer retired.
28. New York 28: Matthew F. McHugh retired.
29. New York 33: Henry J. Nowak retired.
30. North Dakota at-large: Byron Dorgan retired to run for U.S. Senator.
31. Ohio 1: Charlie Luken retired.
32. Ohio 11: Dennis E. Eckart retired.
33. Ohio 13: Don Pease retired.
34. Ohio 19: Ed Feighan retired.
35. Oregon 1: Les AuCoin retired to run for U.S. Senator.
36. Pennsylvania 6: Gus Yatron retired.
37. Pennsylvania 20: Joseph M. Gaydos retired.
38. South Carolina 6: Robin Tallon retired.
39. Utah 2: Wayne Owens retired to run for U.S. Senator.
40. Virginia 6: Jim Olin retired.
41. Wisconsin 5: Jim Moody retired to run for U.S. Senator.

=== Republicans ===
1. Alabama 2: William L. Dickinson retired.
2. Arkansas 3: John Paul Hammerschmidt retired.
3. California 14: Tom Campbell retired to run for U.S. Senator.
4. California 39: William Dannemeyer retired to run for U.S. Senator.
5. California 41: Bill Lowery retired.
6. Florida 4: Craig James retired.
7. Florida 10: Andy Ireland retired.
8. Kentucky 6: Larry J. Hopkins retired.
9. Michigan 1: Bob Davis retired.
10. Michigan 7: Carl Pursell retired.
11. Michigan 11: William Broomfield retired.
12. Minnesota 2: Vin Weber retired.
13. New Jersey 7: Matthew J. Rinaldo retired.
14. New York 4: Norman F. Lent retired.
15. New York 5: Raymond J. McGrath retired.
16. New York 26: David O'Brien Martin retired.
17. New York 29: Frank Horton retired.
18. Ohio 15: Chalmers Wylie retired.
19. Pennsylvania 5: Dick Schulze retired.
20. Pennsylvania 13: Lawrence Coughlin retired.
21. Virginia 7: George Allen retired to run for Governor of Virginia.
22. Washington 1: John Miller retired.
23. Washington 4: Sid Morrison retired to run for Governor of Washington.
24. Washington 8: Rod Chandler retired to run for U.S. Senator.

== Resignation and deaths ==
Three seats were left vacant on the day of the general election due to resignations or death in 1992, two of which were not filled until the next Congress.

=== Democrats ===
Two Democrats died in office

- New York 17: Ted Weiss died on September 14, 1992.
- North Carolina 1: Walter B. Jones Sr. died on September 15, 1992.

=== Popular Democrats ===
One popular democrat resigned before the end of their term.

- Puerto Rico at-large: Jaime Fuster resigned March 4, 1992 to become Justice of the Supreme Court of Puerto Rico.

== Incumbents defeated ==
=== In primary elections ===
==== Democrats ====
Fourteen Democrats lost renomination.

- Arkansas 1. Bill Alexander lost renomination to Blanche Lincoln, who won the general election.
- Arkansas 4. Beryl Anthony Jr. lost renomination to Bill McCuen, who lost the general election to Jay Dickey.
- Georgia 2. Charles Hatcher lost renomination to Sanford Bishop, who won the general election.
- Georgia 10. Ben Jones lost renomination to Don Johnson Jr., who won the general election.
- Illinois 1. Charles Hayes lost renomination to Bobby Rush, who won the general election.
- Illinois 2. Gus Savage lost renomination to Mel Reynolds, who won the general election.
- Illinois 3. Marty Russo lost a redistricting race to fellow incumbent Bill Lipinski, who won the general election.
- Illinois 19. Terry L. Bruce lost a redistricting race to fellow incumbent Glenn Poshard, who won the general election.
- Kentucky 1. Carroll Hubbard lost renomination to Thomas Barlow, who won the general election.
- Maryland 6. Beverly Byron lost renomination to Thomas Hattery, who lost the general election to Roscoe Bartlett.
- Massachusetts 5. Chester G. Atkins lost renomination to Marty Meehan, who won the general election.
- New York 12. Stephen Solarz lost renomination to Nydia Velázquez, who won the general election.
- Pennsylvania 4. Joseph P. Kolter lost renomination to Ron Klink, who won the general election.
- West Virginia 1. Harley O. Staggers Jr. lost a redistricting race to Alan Mollohan, who won the general election.

==== Republicans ====
Five Republicans lost renomination.

- California 22. Robert Lagomarsino lost renomination to Michael Huffington, who won the general election.
- Kansas 4. Dick Nichols lost renomination to Eric R. Yost, who lost the general election to Dan Glickman.
- Michigan 2. Guy Vander Jagt lost renomination to Pete Hoekstra, who won the general election.
- Ohio 6. Clarence E. Miller lost a redistricting race to fellow incumbent Bob McEwen, who lost the general election to Ted Strickland.
- Oklahoma 5. Mickey Edwards lost renomination to Ernest Istook, who won the general election.

=== In the general election ===
==== Democrats ====
Sixteen Democrats lost re-election to Republicans.

- Alabama 6. Ben Erdreich (first elected in 1982) lost re-election to Spencer Bachus.
- Georgia 3. Richard Ray (first elected in 1982) lost re-election to Mac Collins.
- Illinois 16. John W. Cox Jr.(first elected in 1986) lost re-election to Dan Manzullo.
- Indiana 5. Jim Jontz (first elected in 1986) lost re-election to Steve Buyer.
- Iowa 2. David R. Nagle (first elected in 1986) lost a redistricting race to Jim Nussle.
- Louisiana 5. Jerry Huckaby (first elected in 1976) lost a redistricting race to Jim McCrery.
- Maryland 1. Tom McMillen (first elected in 1986) lost a redistricting race to Wayne Gilchrest.
- Massachusetts 3. Joseph D. Early (first elected in 1974) lost re-election to Peter Blute.
- Massachusetts 6. Nicholas Mavroules (first elected in 1978) lost re-election to Peter G. Torkildsen.
- Minnesota 6. Gerry Sikorski (first elected in 1982) lost re-election to Rod Grams.
- Missouri 2. Joan Kelly Horn (first elected in 1990) lost re-election to Jim Talent.
- New York 2. Thomas Downey (first elected in 1974) lost re-election to Rick Lazio.
- Ohio 10. Mary Rose Oakar (first elected in 1976) lost re-election to Martin Hoke.
- Pennsylvania 8. Peter H. Kostmayer (first elected in 1976, and then re-elected in 1982 after losing in 1980) lost re-election to Jim Greenwood.
- South Carolina 4. Liz J. Patterson (first elected in 1982) lost re-election to Bob Inglis.
- Texas 23. Albert Bustamante (first elected in 1984) lost re-election to Henry Bonilla.

==== Republicans ====
Eight Republicans lost re-election to Democrats.

- Arizona 1. Jay Rhodes (first elected in 1986) lost re-election to Sam Coppersmith.
- California 1. Frank Riggs (first elected in 1990) lost re-election to Daniel Hamburg.
- Guam at-large. Ben Blaz (first elected in 1986) lost re-election to Robert A. Underwood.
- Missouri 6. Tom Coleman (first elected in 1976) lost re-election to Pat Danner.
- Montana at-large. Ron Marlenee (first elected in 1976) lost a redistricting race to Pat Williams.
- New York 14. Bill Green (first elected in 1980) lost re-election to Carolyn Maloney.
- Ohio 8. Bob McEwen (first elected in 1982) lost a redistricting race to Ted Strickland.
- Pennsylvania 15. Donald L. Ritter (first elected in 1978) lost re-election to Paul McHale.

One Republican lost re-election to a Republican.

- Louisiana 6. Clyde C. Holloway (first elected in 1986) lost a redistricting race to Richard Baker.

==== Popular Democrats ====
One Popular Democrat lost re-election to a New Progressive.

- Puerto Rico at-large. Antonio Colorado (first elected in 1992) lost re-election to Carlos Romero Barceló.

== Reapportionment ==
The 1990 United States census determined how many of the 435 congressional districts each state receives for the 1990 redistricting cycle. Due to population shifts, New York lost three seats; Illinois, Michigan, Ohio, and Pennsylvania lost two seats; Iowa, Kansas, Kentucky, Louisiana, Massachusetts, Montana, New Jersey, and West Virginia lost one seat; Arizona, Georgia, North Carolina, Virginia, Washington gained one seat; Texas gained three seats; Florida gained four seats; California gained seven seats.

=== New seats ===
Seventeen new districts were created, and three districts were restored after the 1990 redistricting process:

1. Arizona 6
2. California 46
3. California 47
4. California 48
5. California 49
6. California 50
7. California 51
8. California 52
9. Florida 20
10. Florida 21
11. Florida 22
12. Florida 23
13. Georgia 11
14. Montana at-large
15. North Carolina 12
16. Texas 28
17. Texas 29
18. Texas 30
19. Virginia 11
20. Washington 9

=== Seats eliminated ===
The following districts were eliminated and became obsolete:

1. Illinois 21
2. Illinois 22
3. Iowa 6
4. Kansas 5
5. Kentucky 7
6. Louisiana 8
7. Massachusetts 11
8. Michigan 17
9. Michigan 18
10. Montana 1
11. Montana 2
12. New Jersey 14
13. New York 32
14. New York 33
15. New York 34
16. Ohio 21
17. Ohio 22
18. Pennsylvania 22
19. Pennsylvania 23
20. West Virginia 4

=== Seats with multiple incumbents running ===
The following districts had multiple incumbent representatives running, a product of multiple districts merging in redistricting.

1. Illinois 3: Bill Lipinski (D) defeated Marty Russo (D).
2. Illinois 19: Glenn Poshard (D) defeated Terry L. Bruce (D).
3. Iowa 2: Jim Nussle (R) defeated David R. Nagle (D).
4. Louisiana 5: Richard Baker (R) defeated Clyde C. Holloway (R).
5. Maryland 1: Wayne Gilchrest (R) defeated Tom McMillen (D).
6. Montana at-large: Ron Marlenee (R) defeated Pat Williams (D).

== Open seats that changed parties ==
=== Republican seats won by Democrats ===
1. California 14: Won by Anna Eshoo
2. Kentucky 6: Won by Scotty Baesler
3. Michigan 1: Won by Bart Stupak
4. Minnesota 2: Won by David Minge
5. Pennsylvania 13: Won by Marjorie Margolies-Mezvinsky
6. Washington 1: Won by Maria Cantwell
7. Washington 3: Won by Jay Inslee

=== Democratic seats won by Republicans ===
1. California 38: Won by Steve Horn
2. Colorado 3: Won by Scott McInnis
3. Delaware at-large: Won by Mike Castle
4. Georgia 1: Won by Jack Kingston
5. Idaho 2: Won by Mike Crapo
6. New York 30: Won by Jack Quinn
7. Virginia 6: Won by Bob Goodlatte

== Open seats that parties held ==
=== Democratic holds ===
1. Alabama 7: Won by Earl Hilliard
2. Arkansas 1: Won by Blanche Lincoln
3. California 6: Won by Lynn Woolsey
4. California 30: Won by Xavier Becerra
5. California 36: Won by Jane Harman
6. California 37: Won by Walter R. Tucker III
7. Florida 17: Won by Carrie Meek
8. Florida 20: Won by Peter Deutsch
9. Georgia 2: Won by Sanford Bishop
10. Georgia 9: Won by Nathan Deal
11. Georgia 10: Won by Don Johnson Jr.
12. Illinois 1: Won by Bobby Rush
13. Illinois 2: Won by Mel Reynolds
14. Kentucky 1: Won by Thomas Barlow
15. Massachusetts 5: Won by Marty Meehan
16. Georgia 10: Won by Don Johnson Jr.
17. Michigan 5: Won by James Barcia
18. New Jersey 8: Won by Herb Klein
19. New Jersey 13: Won by Bob Menendez
20. New York 8: Won by Jerry Nadler
21. New York 12: Won by Nydia Velázquez
22. New York 12: Won by Maurice Hinchey
23. North Carolina 1: Won by Eva Clayton, who also won the district's special election, see below
24. Ohio 1: Won by David S. Mann
25. Ohio 13: Won by Sherrod Brown
26. Ohio 19: Won by Eric Fingerhut
27. Oregon 1: Won by Elizabeth Furse
28. Pennsylvania 6: Won by Ron Klink
29. Pennsylvania 8: Won by Tim Holden
30. South Carolina 6: Won by Jim Clyburn
31. Utah 2: Won by Karen Shepherd
32. Wisconsin 5: Won by Tom Barrett

=== Republican holds ===
1. Alabama 2: Won by Terry Everett
2. Arkansas 3: Won by Tim Hutchinson
3. California 22: Won by Michael Huffington
4. California 39: Won by Ed Royce
5. Florida 4: Won by Tillie Fowler
6. Florida 12: Won by Charles Canady
7. Michigan 2: Won by Pete Hoekstra
8. Michigan 7: Won by Nick Smith
9. Michigan 11: Won by Joe Knollenberg
10. New Jersey 7: Won by Bob Franks
11. New York 3: Won by Peter T. King
12. New York 4: Won by David A. Levy
13. New York 24: Won by John M. McHugh
14. Ohio 15: Won by Deborah Pryce
15. Oklahoma 5: Won by Ernest Istook
16. Washington 7: Won by Jennifer Dunn

Of the 435 districts created in the 1990 redistricting, twenty-seven had no incumbent representative.

=== Democratic gain ===
Eighteen Democrats were elected in newly created seats.

1. Arizona 6: Won by Karan English
2. California 33: Won by Lucille Roybal-Allard
3. California 49: Won by Lynn Schenk
4. California 50: Won by Bob Filner
5. Florida 3: Won by Corrine Brown
6. Florida 5: Won by Karen Thurman
7. Florida 23: Won by Alcee Hastings
8. Georgia 11: Won by Cynthia McKinney
9. Illinois 4: Won by Luis Gutiérrez
10. Louisiana 4: Won by Cleo Fields
11. Maryland 4: Won by Albert Wynn
12. North Carolina 12: Won by Mel Watt
13. Texas 28: Won by Frank Tejeda
14. Texas 29: Won by Gene Green
15. Texas 30: Won by Eddie Bernice Johnson
16. Virginia 3: Won by Bobby Scott
17. Virginia 11: Won by Leslie Byrne
18. Washington 9: Won by Mike Kreidler

=== Republican gain ===
Nine Republicans were elected in newly created seats.

1. California 11: Won by Bill Baker
2. California 13: Won by Richard Pombo
3. California 25: Won by Buck McKeon
4. California 41: Won by Jay Kim
5. California 43: Won by Ken Calvert
6. Florida 7: Won by John Mica
7. Florida 13: Won by Dan Miller
8. Florida 21: Won by Lincoln Díaz-Balart
9. Georgia 4: Won by John Linder

== Closest races ==
Eighty-three races were decided by 10% or lower.

District	Winner	Margin
Minnesota 2nd	Democratic (flip)	0.21%
California 19th	Democratic	0.47%
Pennsylvania 13th	Democratic (flip)	0.54%
Georgia 4th	Republican	1.07%
Iowa 2nd	Republican	1.11%
Louisiana 6th	Republican	1.11%
Michigan 8th	Democratic	1.27%
Minnesota 7th	Democratic	1.31%
Tennessee 3rd	Democratic	1.35%
Florida 15th	Democratic	1.35%
Ohio 6th	Democratic (flip)	1.43%
Pennsylvania 20th	Democratic	1.46%
Alabama 2nd	Republican	1.57%
Connecticut 2nd	Democratic	1.60%
Washington 4th	Democratic (flip)	1.68%
Iowa 3rd	Republican	1.89%
California 11th	Republican	1.97%
Indiana 5th	Republican (flip)	2.05%
New York 14th	Democratic (flip)	2.20%
Missouri 9th	Democratic	2.25%
Nebraska 2nd	Democratic	2.44%
California 1st	Democratic (flip)	2.55%
Missouri 2nd	Republican (flip)	2.84%
South Carolina 4th	Republican (flip)	2.87%
Arkansas 3rd	Republican	3.01%
New York 3rd	Republican	3.10%
Maryland 1st	Republican	3.12%
New York 1st	Democratic	3.46%
Montana at-large	Democratic	3.50%
New York 26th	Democratic	3.72%
Utah 2nd	Democratic	3.73%
Texas 16th	Democratic	3.78%
California 10th	Republican	3.95%
Alaska at-large	Republican	3.96%
Oregon 1st	Democratic	4.06%
California 4th	Republican	4.12%
Pennsylvania 6th	Democratic	4.14%
Florida 12th	Republican	4.22%
Nevada 2nd	Republican	4.58%
Arkansas 4th	Republican (flip)	4.67%
New York 4th	Republican	4.68%
Virginia 11th	Democratic	4.84%
California 38th	Republican (flip)	5.25%
Ohio 19th	Democratic	5.27%
Kentucky 3rd	Democratic	5.48%
Oklahoma 1st	Republican	5.58%
Pennsylvania 15th	Democratic (flip)	5.58%
Wisconsin 6th	Republican	5.75%
Florida 5th	Democratic	5.82%
New Jersey 8th	Democratic	5.86%
New York 30th	Republican (flip)	5.88%
Massachusetts 3rd	Republican (flip)	6.09%
California 36th	Democratic	6.19%
Pennsylvania 8th	Republican (flip)	6.21%
New York 2nd	Republican (flip)	6.35%
California 43rd	Republican	6.69%
Arizona 1st	Democratic (flip)	6.71%
Oklahoma 5th	Republican	6.78%
Michigan 12th	Democratic	6.95%
North Carolina 5th	Democratic	7.04%
Maine 2nd	Republican	7.13%
Indiana 8th	Democratic	7.21%
Alabama 6th	Republican (flip)	7.33%
New York 5th	Democratic	7.38%
Georgia 10th	Democratic	7.63%
New Jersey 6th	Democratic	7.66%
Ohio 1st	Democratic	7.97%
Massachusetts 1st	Democratic	8.10%
Florida 1st	Democratic	8.13%
Maryland 6th	Republican (flip)	8.34%
California 49th	Democratic	8.48% (Note: This seat was the tipping point seat for a Democratic majority.)
Michigan 9th	Democratic	8.88%
Washington 9th	Democratic	8.92%
Michigan 10th	Democratic	8.94%
Maryland 5th	Democratic	9.10%
Michigan 13th	Democratic	9.14%
California 46th	Republican	9.23%
Kentucky 5th	Republican	9.24%
North Carolina 11th	Republican	9.30%
North Carolina 2nd	Democratic	9.36%
Georgia 3rd	Republican (flip)	9.52%
Kansas 4th	Democratic	9.57%
Massachusetts 6th	Republican (flip)	9.96%

== Special elections ==
District	Incumbent			This race	
District	Member / Delegate	Party	First elected	Results	Candidates
Puerto Rico at-large	Jaime Fuster	Popular Democratic	1984	Incumbent resigned March 4, 1992 to become Justice of the Supreme Court of Puerto Rico. New member elected March 4, 1992; Popular Democratic hold.	▌ ✓ Antonio Colorado (Popular Democratic); [data missing]
New York 17	Ted Weiss	Democratic	1976	Incumbent died September 14, 1992. New member elected November 3, 1992. Democratic hold.	▌ ✓ Jerry Nadler (Democratic); Uncontested
North Carolina 1	Walter B. Jones Sr.	Democratic	1966 (Special)	Incumbent died September 15, 1992. New member elected November 3, 1992. Democratic hold.	▌ ✓ Eva Clayton (Democratic) 56.7%; ▌Ted Tyler (Republican) 41.3%; ▌C. Barry Williams (Libertarian) 2.0%

== Alabama ==
District	Incumbent			This race	
District	Member	Party	First elected	Results	Candidates
Alabama 1	Sonny Callahan	Republican	1984	Incumbent re-elected.	▌ ✓ Sonny Callahan (Republican) 60.2%; ▌William Brewer (Democratic) 36.8%; ▌John Garrett (Libertarian) 3.0%
Alabama 2	William L. Dickinson	Republican	1964	Incumbent retired. Republican hold.	▌ ✓ Terry Everett (Republican) 49.5%; ▌George Wallace Jr. (Democratic) 47.9%; ▌Glynn Reeves (Libertarian) 1.4%; Others: ▌Malcolm Brassell (Independent) 0.6%; ▌Richard Boone (Independent) 0.6%
Alabama 3	Glen Browder	Democratic	1989 (Special)	Incumbent re-elected.	▌ ✓ Glen Browder (Democratic) 60.3%; ▌Don Sledge (Republican) 37.3%; ▌Rodric Templeton (Libertarian) 2.3%
Alabama 4	Tom Bevill	Democratic	1966	Incumbent re-elected.	▌ ✓ Tom Bevill (Democratic) 68.5%; ▌Martha Strickland (Republican) 29.0%; ▌Robert King (Libertarian) 2.5%
Alabama 5	Bud Cramer	Democratic	1990	Incumbent re-elected.	▌ ✓ Bud Cramer (Democratic) 65.6%; ▌Terry Smith (Republican) 31.9%; ▌Michael Seibert (Libertarian) 2.5%
Alabama 6	Ben Erdreich	Democratic	1982	Incumbent lost re-election. Republican gain.	▌ ✓ Spencer Bachus (Republican) 52.3%; ▌Ben Erdreich (Democratic) 45.0%; ▌Carla Cloum (Independent) 1.6%; ▌Mark Bodenhausen (Libertarian) 1.0%
Alabama 7	Claude Harris Jr.	Democratic	1986	Incumbent retired. Democratic hold.	▌ ✓ Earl Hilliard (Democratic) 69.5%; ▌Kervin Jones (Republican) 17.4%; ▌James Lewis (Independent) 6.0%; ▌James Chambliss (Independent) 5.5%; ▌Michael Todd Mayer (Libertarian) 1.0%; ▌John Hawkins (Socialist Workers) 0.6%

== Alaska ==
District	Incumbent			This race	
District	Member	Party	First elected	Results	Candidates
Alaska at-large	Don Young	Republican	1973 (Special)	Incumbent re-elected.	▌ ✓ Don Young (Republican) 46.7%; ▌John S. Devens (Democratic) 42.8%; ▌Michael States (AIP) 6.2%; ▌Mike Milligan (Green) 3.9%

== Arizona ==
District	Incumbent			This race	
District	Member	Party	First elected	Results	Candidates
Arizona 1	Jay Rhodes	Republican	1986	Incumbent lost re-election. Democratic gain.	▌ ✓ Sam Coppersmith (Democratic) 51.3%; ▌Jay Rhodes (Republican) 44.6%; ▌Ted Goldstein (Natural Law) 4.1%
Arizona 2	Ed Pastor	Democratic	1991 (Special)	Incumbent re-elected.	▌ ✓ Ed Pastor (Democratic) 66.0%; ▌Don Shooter (Republican) 30.0%; ▌Dan Detaranto (Libertarian) 4.0%
Arizona 3	Bob Stump	Republican	1976 (Note: Stump was originally elected as a Democrat. He switched parties in 1982 and was re-elected as such that year.)	Incumbent re-elected.	▌ ✓ Bob Stump (Republican) 61.5%; ▌Roger Hartstone (Democratic) 34.4%; ▌Pamela Volponi (Natural Law) 4.1%
Arizona 4	Jon Kyl	Republican	1986	Incumbent re-elected.	▌ ✓ Jon Kyl (Republican) 59.2%; ▌Walter Mybeck (Democratic) 26.7%; ▌Debbie Collings (Independent) 9.7%; ▌Tim McDermott (Libertarian) 4.4%
Arizona 5	Jim Kolbe	Republican	1984	Incumbent re-elected.	▌ ✓ Jim Kolbe (Republican) 66.5%; ▌Jim Toevs (Democratic) 29.7%; ▌Perry Willis (Libertarian) 3.7%
Arizona 6	None (District created)			New seat. Democratic gain.	▌ ✓ Karan English (Democratic) 53.0%; ▌Doug Wead (Republican) 41.4%; ▌Sarah Stannard (Independent) 5.6%

== Arkansas ==
District	Incumbent			This race	
District	Member	Party	First elected	Results	Candidates
Arkansas 1	Bill Alexander	Democratic	1968	Incumbent lost renomination. Democratic hold.	▌ ✓ Blanche Lincoln (Democratic) 69.8%; ▌Terry Hayes (Republican) 30.2%
Arkansas 2	Ray Thornton	Democratic	1972; 1978 (retired); 1990	Incumbent re-elected.	▌ ✓ Ray Thornton (Democratic) 74.2%; ▌Dennis Scott (Republican) 25.8%
Arkansas 3	John Paul Hammerschmidt	Republican	1966	Incumbent retired. Republican hold.	▌ ✓ Tim Hutchinson (Republican) 50.2%; ▌John VanWinkle (Democratic) 47.2%; ▌Ralph Forbes (Independent) 2.5%
Arkansas 4	Beryl Anthony Jr.	Democratic	1978	Incumbent lost renomination. Republican gain.	▌ ✓ Jay Dickey (Republican) 52.3%; ▌Bill McCuen (Democratic) 47.7%

== California ==
The delegation increased from 45 to 52 seats. To create the seven-seat net gain, eight seats were added, designated as: the 10th, 11th, 25th, 33rd, 41st, 43rd, 49th, and 50th districts, and one seat was lost through the merger of two seats: the former 41st and 44th districts merged into the redesignated 51st district, in an election contest.

District	Incumbent			This race	
District	Member	Party	First elected	Results	Candidates
California 1	Frank Riggs	Republican	1990	Incumbent lost re-election. Democratic gain.	▌ ✓ Daniel Hamburg (Democratic) 47.6%; ▌Frank Riggs (Republican) 45.1%; ▌Phil Baldwin (Peace and Freedom) 4.3%; ▌Matthew L. Howard (Libertarian) 3%
California 2	Wally Herger	Republican	1986	Incumbent re-elected.	▌ ✓ Wally Herger (Republican) 65.2%; ▌Elliot Roy Freedman (Democratic) 28%; ▌Doc Pendery (Libertarian) 6.8%
California 3	Vic Fazio; Redistricted from the 4th district	Democratic	1978	Incumbent re-elected.	▌ ✓ Vic Fazio (Democratic) 51.2%; ▌H. L. Richardson (Republican) 40.3%; ▌Ross Crain (Libertarian) 8.6%
California 4	John Doolittle; Redistricted from the 14th district	Republican	1990	Incumbent re-elected.	▌ ✓ John Doolittle (Republican) 49.8%; ▌Patricia Malberg (Democratic) 45.7%; ▌Patrick Lee McHargue (Libertarian) 4.5%
California 5	Bob Matsui; Redistricted from the 3rd district	Democratic	1978	Incumbent re-elected.	▌ ✓ Bob Matsui (Democratic) 68.6%; ▌Robert S. Dinsmore (Republican) 25.5%; ▌Gordon D. Mors (American Independent) 2.1%; ▌Chris J. Rufer (Libertarian) 2%; ▌Tian Harter (Green) 1.9%
California 6	Barbara Boxer	Democratic	1982	Retired to run for U.S. senator. Democratic hold.	▌ ✓ Lynn Woolsey (Democratic) 65.2%; ▌Bill Filante (Republican) 33.6%
California 7	George Miller	Democratic	1974	Incumbent re-elected.	▌ ✓ George Miller (Democratic) 70.3%; ▌Dave Scholl (Republican) 25.2%; ▌David L. Franklin (Peace and Freedom) 4.5%
California 8	Nancy Pelosi; Redistricted from the 5th district	Democratic	1987 (special)	Incumbent re-elected.	▌ ✓ Nancy Pelosi (Democratic) 82.5%; ▌Marc Wolin (Republican) 11%; ▌Cesar G. Cadabes (Peace and Freedom) 3.3%; ▌James R. Elwood (Libertarian) 3.2%
California 9	Ron Dellums; Redistricted from the 8th district	Democratic	1970	Incumbent re-elected.	▌ ✓ Ron Dellums (Democratic) 71.9%; ▌Billy Hunter (Republican) 23.5%; ▌Dave Linn (Peace and Freedom) 4.6%
California 10	None (District created)			New seat. Republican gain.	▌ ✓ Bill Baker (Republican) 52%; ▌Wendell H. Williams (Democratic) 48%
California 11	None (District created)			New seat. Republican gain.	▌ ✓ Richard Pombo (Republican) 47.6%; ▌Patti Garamendi (Democratic) 45.6%; ▌Christine Roberts (Libertarian) 6.8%
California 12	Tom Lantos; Redistricted from the 11th district	Democratic	1980	Incumbent re-elected.	▌ ✓ Tom Lantos (Democratic) 68.8%; ▌Jim R. Tomlin (Republican) 23.3%; ▌Mary Weldon (Peace and Freedom) 4.4%; ▌George L. O'Brien (Libertarian) 3.4%
California 13	Pete Stark; Redistricted from the 9th district	Democratic	1972	Incumbent re-elected.	▌ ✓ Pete Stark (Democratic) 60.2%; ▌Verne W. Teyler (Republican) 31.6%; ▌Roslyn A. Allen (Peace and Freedom) 8.2%
California 14	Tom Campbell; Redistricted from the 12th district	Republican	1988	Retired to run for U.S. senator. Democratic gain.	▌ ✓ Anna Eshoo (Democratic) 56.7%; ▌Tom Huening (Republican) 39%; ▌Chuck Olson (Libertarian) 2.8%; ▌David Wald (Peace and Freedom) 1.5%
California 15	Norman Mineta; Redistricted from the 13th district	Democratic	1974	Incumbent re-elected.	▌ ✓ Norman Mineta (Democratic) 63.5%; ▌Robert Wick (Republican) 31.2%; ▌Duggan Dieterly (Libertarian) 5%
California 16	Don Edwards; Redistricted from the 10th district	Democratic	1972	Incumbent re-elected.	▌ ✓ Don Edwards (Democratic) 62%; ▌Ted Bundesen (Republican) 32%; ▌Amani S. Kuumba (Peace and Freedom) 6%
California 17	Leon Panetta; Redistricted from the 16th district	Democratic	1976	Incumbent re-elected.	▌ ✓ Leon Panetta (Democratic) 72.1%; ▌Bill McCampbell (Republican) 23.7%; ▌Maureen Smith (Peace and Freedom) 2.3%; ▌John D. Wilkes (Libertarian) 1.9%
California 18	Gary Condit; Redistricted from the 15th district	Democratic	1989 (special)	Incumbent re-elected.	▌ ✓ Gary Condit (Democratic) 84.7%; ▌Kim R. Almstrom (Libertarian) 15.3%
California 19	Rick Lehman; Redistricted from the 18th district	Democratic	1982	Incumbent re-elected.	▌ ✓ Rick Lehman (Democratic) 46.9%; ▌Tal L. Cloud (Republican) 46.4%; ▌Dorothy L. Wells (Peace and Freedom) 6.2%
California 20	Cal Dooley; Redistricted from the 17th district	Democratic	1990	Incumbent re-elected.	▌ ✓ Cal Dooley (Democratic) 64.9%; ▌Ed Hunt (Republican) 35.1%
California 21	Bill Thomas; Redistricted from the 20th district	Republican	1978	Incumbent re-elected.	▌ ✓ Bill Thomas (Republican) 65.2%; ▌Deborah A. Vollmer (Democratic) 34.7%
California 22	Bob Lagomarsino; Redistricted from the 19th district	Republican	1974	Incumbent lost renomination. Republican hold.	▌ ✓ Michael Huffington (Republican) 52.5%; ▌Gloria Ochoa (Democratic) 34.9%; ▌Mindy Lorenz (Green) 9.5%; ▌William Howard Dilbeck (Libertarian) 3%
California 23	Elton Gallegly; Redistricted from the 21st district	Republican	1986	Incumbent re-elected.	▌ ✓ Elton Gallegly (Republican) 54.3%; ▌Anita Perez Ferguson (Democratic) 41.4%; ▌Jay C. Wood (Libertarian) 4.3%
California 24	Anthony Beilenson; Redistricted from the 23rd district	Democratic	1976	Incumbent re-elected.	▌ ✓ Anthony Beilenson (Democratic) 55.5%; ▌Tom McClintock (Republican) 39.1%; ▌John P. Lindblad (Peace and Freedom) 5.4%
California 25	None (District created)			New seat. Republican gain.	▌ ✓ Buck McKeon (Republican) 51.9%; ▌Gil Gilmartin (Democratic) 33%; ▌Rick Pamplin (Independent) 6.4%; ▌Peggy L. Christensen (Libertarian) 3.2%; ▌Charles Wilken (Green) 3.2%; ▌Nancy Lawrence (Peace and Freedom) 2.3%
California 26	Howard Berman	Democratic	1982	Incumbent re-elected.	▌ ✓ Howard Berman (Democratic) 61%; ▌Gary E. Forsch (Republican) 30.2%; ▌Margery Hinds (Peace and Freedom) 5.9%; ▌Bernard Zimring (Libertarian) 2.9%
California 27	Carlos Moorhead; Redistricted from the 22nd district	Republican	1972	Incumbent re-elected.	▌ ✓ Carlos Moorhead (Republican) 49.7%; ▌Doug Kahn (Democratic) 39.4%; ▌Jesse A. Moorman (Green) 5.2%; ▌Margaret Edwards (Peace and Freedom) 3.5%; ▌Dennis Decherd (Libertarian) 2.3%
California 28	David Dreier; Redistricted from the 33rd district	Republican	1980	Incumbent re-elected.	▌ ✓ David Dreier (Republican) 58.4%; ▌Al Wachtel (Democratic) 36.6%; ▌Walt Contreras Sheasby (Green) 3%; ▌Thomas J. Dominy (Libertarian) 2%
California 29	Henry Waxman; Redistricted from the 24th district	Democratic	1974	Incumbent re-elected.	▌ ✓ Henry Waxman (Democratic) 61.3%; ▌Mark Robbins (Republican) 25.7%; ▌David Davis (Independent) 5.9%; ▌Susan C. Davies (Peace and Freedom) 5.3%; ▌Felix Tsvi Rogin (Libertarian) 1.8%
California 30	Edward R. Roybal; Redistricted from the 25th district	Democratic	1962	Incumbent retired. Democratic hold.	▌ ✓ Xavier Becerra (Democratic) 58.4%; ▌Morry Waksberg (Republican) 24%; ▌Blase Bonpane (Green) 7.6%; ▌Elizabeth Nakano (Peace and Freedom) 7.4%; ▌Drew Consalvo (Libertarian) 2.7%
California 31	Matthew G. Martínez; Redistricted from the 30th district	Democratic	1982	Incumbent re-elected.	▌ ✓ Matthew G. Martínez (Democratic) 62.6%; ▌Reuben D. Franco (Republican) 37.4%
California 32	Julian Dixon; Redistricted from the 28th district	Democratic	1978	Incumbent re-elected.	▌ ✓ Julian Dixon (Democratic) 87.2%; ▌Bob Weber (Libertarian) 7.2%; ▌William R. Williams (Peace and Freedom) 5.7%
California 33	None (District created)			New seat. Democratic gain.	▌ ✓ Lucille Roybal-Allard (Democratic) 63%; ▌Robert Guzman (Republican) 30.4%; ▌Tim Delia (Peace and Freedom) 4.2%; ▌Dale S. Olvera (Libertarian) 2.4%
California 34	Esteban Torres	Democratic	1982	Incumbent re-elected.	▌ ✓ Esteban Torres (Democratic) 61.3%; ▌J. Jay Hernandez (Republican) 34%; ▌Marty Swinney (Libertarian) 4.7%
California 35	Maxine Waters; Redistricted from the 29th district	Democratic	1990	Incumbent re-elected.	▌ ✓ Maxine Waters (Democratic) 82.5%; ▌Nate Truman (Republican) 14%; ▌Alice Mae Miles (Peace and Freedom) 2.2%; ▌Carin Rogers (Libertarian) 1.3%
California 36	Mel Levine; Redistricted from the 27th district	Democratic	1982	Retired to run for U.S. senator. Democratic hold.	▌ ✓ Jane Harman (Democratic) 48.4%; ▌Joan Milke Flores (Republican) 42.2%; ▌Richard Greene (Green) 5.1%; ▌Marc F. Denny (Libertarian) 2.1%; ▌Owen Staley (Peace and Freedom) 2.1%
California 37	Mervyn Dymally; Redistricted from the 31st district	Democratic	1982	Incumbent retired. Democratic hold.	▌ ✓ Walter R. Tucker III (Democratic) 85.7%; ▌B. Kwaku Duren (Peace and Freedom) 14.3%
California 38	Glenn M. Anderson; Redistricted from the 32nd district	Democratic	1968	Incumbent retired. Republican gain.	▌ ✓ Steve Horn (Republican) 48.6%; ▌Evan Anderson Braude (Democratic) 43.4%; ▌Paul Burton (Peace and Freedom) 4.4%; ▌Blake Ashley (Libertarian) 3.6%
California 39	William Dannemeyer	Republican	1978	Retired to run for U.S. senator. Republican hold.	▌ ✓ Ed Royce (Republican) 57.3%; ▌Molly McClanahan (Democratic) 38.5%; ▌Jack Dean (Libertarian) 4.4%
California 40	Jerry Lewis; Redistricted from the 35th district	Republican	1978	Incumbent re-elected.	▌ ✓ Jerry Lewis (Republican) 63.1%; ▌Donald M. "Don" Rusk (Democratic) 31.1%; ▌Margie Akin (Peace and Freedom) 5.8%
California 41	None (District created)			New seat. Republican gain.	▌ ✓ Jay Kim (Republican) 59.6%; ▌Bob Baker (Democratic) 34.4%; ▌Mike Noonan (Peace and Freedom) 5.9%
California 42	George Brown Jr. Redistricted from the 36th district	Democratic	1962; 1970 (retired); 1972	Incumbent re-elected.	▌ ✓ George Brown Jr. (Democratic) 50.7%; ▌Dick Rutan (Republican) 44%; ▌Fritz R. Ward (Libertarian) 5.4%
California 43	None (District created)			New seat. Republican gain.	▌ ✓ Ken Calvert (Republican) 46.7%; ▌Mark Takano (Democratic) 46.4%; ▌Gary R. Odom (American Independent) 3.2%; ▌Gene L. Berkman (Libertarian) 2.6%
California 44	Al McCandless; Redistricted from the 37th district	Republican	1984	Incumbent re-elected.	▌ ✓ Al McCandless (Republican) 54.2%; ▌Georgia Smith (Democratic) 40.1%; ▌Phil Turner (Libertarian) 5.7%
California 45	Dana Rohrabacher; Redistricted from the 42nd district	Republican	1988	Incumbent re-elected.	▌ ✓ Dana Rohrabacher (Republican) 54.5%; ▌Pat McCabe (Democratic) 39%; ▌Gary David Copeland (Libertarian) 6.5%
California 46	Bob Dornan; Redistricted from the 38th district	Republican	1976; 1982 (retired); 1984	Incumbent re-elected.	▌ ✓ Bob Dornan (Republican) 50.2%; ▌Robert John Banuelos (Democratic) 41%; ▌Richard G. Newhouse (Libertarian) 8.8%
California 47	Christopher Cox; Redistricted from the 40th district	Republican	1988	Incumbent re-elected.	▌ ✓ Christopher Cox (Republican) 64.9%; ▌John F. Anwiler (Democratic) 30.3%; ▌Maxine Bell Quirk (Peace and Freedom) 4.8%
California 48	Ron Packard; Redistricted from the 43rd district	Republican	1982	Incumbent re-elected.	▌ ✓ Ron Packard (Republican) 61.1%; ▌Mike Farber (Democratic) 29.3%; ▌Donna White (Peace and Freedom) 5.8%; ▌Ted Lowe (Libertarian) 3.8%
California 49	None (District created)			New seat. Democratic gain.	▌ ✓ Lynn Schenk (Democratic) 51.1%; ▌Judy Jarvis (Republican) 42.7%; ▌John Wallner (Libertarian) 4.3%; ▌Milton Zaslow (Peace and Freedom) 1.9%
California 50	None (District created)			New seat. Democratic gain.	▌ ✓ Bob Filner (Democratic) 56.6%; ▌Tony Valencia (Republican) 28.9%; ▌Barbara Hutchinson (Libertarian) 11.3%; ▌Roger Batchelder (Peace and Freedom) 3.1%
California 51	Duke Cunningham; Redistricted from the 44th district	Republican	1990	Incumbent re-elected.	▌ ✓ Duke Cunningham (Republican) 56.1%; ▌Bea Herbert (Democratic) 33.7%; ▌Miriam E. Clark (Peace and Freedom) 4.1%; ▌Bill Holmes (Libertarian) 4.1%; ▌Richard Roe (Green) 2.1%
California 51	Bill Lowery; Redistricted from the 41st district	Republican	1980	Incumbent retired. Republican loss.	▌ ✓ Duke Cunningham (Republican) 56.1%; ▌Bea Herbert (Democratic) 33.7%; ▌Miriam E. Clark (Peace and Freedom) 4.1%; ▌Bill Holmes (Libertarian) 4.1%; ▌Richard Roe (Green) 2.1%
California 52	Duncan L. Hunter; Redistricted from the 45th district	Republican	1980	Incumbent re-elected.	▌ ✓ Duncan L. Hunter (Republican) 52.9%; ▌Janet M. Gastil (Democratic) 41.2%; ▌Joseph B. Shea (Libertarian) 3.3%; ▌Dennis Gretsinger (Peace and Freedom) 2.7%

== Colorado ==
District	Incumbent			This race	
District	Member	Party	First elected	Results	Candidates
Colorado 1	Pat Schroeder	Democratic	1972	Incumbent re-elected.	▌ ✓ Pat Schroeder (Democratic) 68.8%; ▌Raymond Diaz Aragon (Republican) 31.2%
Colorado 2	David Skaggs	Democratic	1986	Incumbent re-elected.	▌ ✓ David Skaggs (Democratic) 60.7%; ▌Bryan Day (Republican) 32.6%; ▌Vern Tharp (Grassroots) 6.7%
Colorado 3	Ben Nighthorse Campbell	Democratic	1986	Retired to run for U.S. senator. Republican gain.	▌ ✓ Scott McInnis (Republican) 54.7%; ▌Mike Callihan (Democratic) 43.7%; ▌Ki R. Nelson (Populist) 1.6%
Colorado 4	Wayne Allard	Republican	1990	Incumbent re-elected.	▌ ✓ Wayne Allard (Republican) 57.8%; ▌Tom Redder (Democratic) 42.2%
Colorado 5	Joel Hefley	Republican	1986	Incumbent re-elected.	▌ ✓ Joel Hefley (Republican) 71.1%; ▌Charles Oriez (Democratic) 25.7%; ▌Keith Hamburger (Libertarian) 3.2%
Colorado 6	Daniel Schaefer	Republican	1983 (Special)	Incumbent re-elected.	▌ ✓ Daniel Schaefer (Republican) 60.9%; ▌Tom Kolbe (Democratic) 39.1%

== Connecticut ==
District	Incumbent			This race	
District	Member	Party	First elected	Results	Candidates
Connecticut 1	Barbara B. Kennelly	Democratic	1982	Incumbent re-elected.	▌ ✓ Barbara B. Kennelly (Democratic) 67.1%; ▌Philip Steele (Republican) 30.6%; ▌Gary Garneau (Concerned Citizens) 2.3%
Connecticut 2	Sam Gejdenson	Democratic	1980	Incumbent re-elected.	▌ ✓ Sam Gejdenson (Democratic) 50.8%; ▌Edward W. Munster (Republican) 49.2%
Connecticut 3	Rosa DeLauro	Democratic	1990	Incumbent re-elected.	▌ ✓ Rosa DeLauro (Democratic) 65.7%; ▌Tom Scott (Republican) 34.3%
Connecticut 4	Chris Shays	Republican	1987 (special)	Incumbent re-elected.	▌ ✓ Chris Shays (Republican) 67.3%; ▌Dave Schropfer (Democratic) 26.7%; ▌Al Smith (ACP) 5.3%; ▌Ronald Fried (Natural Law) 0.7%
Connecticut 5	Gary Franks	Republican	1990	Incumbent re-elected.	▌ ✓ Gary Franks (Republican) 43.6%; ▌James Lawlor (Democratic) 31.1%; ▌Lynn Taborsak (ACP) 22.5%; ▌Rosita Rodriguez (Concerned Citizens) 2.1%; Others: ▌Bernard Nevas (Natural Law) 0.4%; ▌David LaPointe (Independent) 0.3%
Connecticut 6	Nancy Johnson	Republican	1982	Incumbent re-elected.	▌ ✓ Nancy Johnson (Republican) 69.7%; ▌Eugene Slason (Democratic) 25.2%; ▌Daniel Plawecki (Concerned Citizens) 4.0%; Others: ▌Charles Pearl (Independent) 0.7%; ▌Ralph Economu (Independent) 0.4%

== Delaware ==
District	Incumbent			This race	
District	Member	Party	First elected	Results	Candidates
Delaware at-large	Tom Carper	Democratic	1982	Retired to run for Governor. Republican gain.	▌ ✓ Mike Castle (Republican) 55.4%; ▌S. B. Woo (Democratic) 42.5%; ▌Peggy Schmitt (Libertarian) 2.1%

== Florida ==
Four seats were added by reapportionment.

District	Incumbent			This race	
District	Member	Party	First elected	Results	Candidates
Florida 1	Earl Hutto	Democratic	1978	Incumbent re-elected.	▌ ✓ Earl Hutto (Democratic) 52.0%; ▌Terry Ketchel (Republican) 43.9%; ▌Barbara Rodgers-Hendricks (Green) 4.1%
Florida 2	Pete Peterson	Democratic	1990	Incumbent re-elected.	▌ ✓ Pete Peterson (Democratic) 73.4%; ▌Ray Wagner (Republican) 26.5%
Florida 3	None (District created)			New seat. Democratic gain.	▌ ✓ Corrine Brown (Democratic) 59.3%; ▌Don Weidner (Republican) 40.7%
Florida 4	Craig James	Republican	1988	Incumbent retired. Republican hold.	▌ ✓ Tillie Fowler (Republican) 56.7%; ▌Mattox Hair (Democratic) 43.2%
Florida 4	Charles E. Bennett; Redistricted from the 3rd district	Democratic	1948	Incumbent retired. Democratic loss.	▌ ✓ Tillie Fowler (Republican) 56.7%; ▌Mattox Hair (Democratic) 43.2%
Florida 5	None (District created)			New seat. Democratic gain.	▌ ✓ Karen Thurman (Democratic) 49.2%; ▌Tom Hogan (Republican) 43.4%; ▌Cindy Munkittrick (Independent) 7.4%
Florida 6	Cliff Stearns	Republican	1988	Incumbent re-elected.	▌ ✓ Cliff Stearns (Republican) 65.4%; ▌Phil Denton (Democratic) 34.6%
Florida 7	None (District created)			New seat. Republican gain.	▌ ✓ John Mica (Republican) 56.4%; ▌Dan Webster (Democratic) 43.5%
Florida 8	Bill McCollum; Redistricted from the 5th district	Republican	1980	Incumbent re-elected.	▌ ✓ Bill McCollum (Republican) 68.5%; ▌Chuck Kovaleski (Democratic) 31.5%
Florida 9	Michael Bilirakis	Republican	1982	Incumbent re-elected.	▌ ✓ Michael Bilirakis (Republican) 58.9%; ▌Cheryl Davis Knapp (Democratic) 41.1%
Florida 10	Bill Young; Redistricted from the 8th district	Republican	1970	Incumbent re-elected.	▌ ✓ Bill Young (Republican) 56.6%; ▌Karen Moffitt (Democratic) 43.4%
Florida 11	Sam Gibbons; Redistricted from the 7th district	Democratic	1962	Incumbent re-elected.	▌ ✓ Sam Gibbons (Democratic) 52.8%; ▌Mark Sharpe (Republican) 40.6%; ▌Joe De Minico (Independent) 6.7%
Florida 12	Andy Ireland; Redistricted from the 10th district	Republican	1976	Incumbent retired. Republican hold.	▌ ✓ Charles Canady (Republican) 52.1%; ▌Tom Mims (Democratic) 47.9%
Florida 13	None (District created)			New seat. Republican gain.	▌ ✓ Dan Miller (Republican) 57.8%; ▌Rand Snell (Democratic) 42.2%
Florida 14	Porter Goss; Redistricted from the 13th district	Republican	1988	Incumbent re-elected.	▌ ✓ Porter Goss (Republican) 82.1%; ▌James King (Independent) 17.9%
Florida 15	Jim Bacchus; Redistricted from the 11th district	Democratic	1990	Incumbent re-elected.	▌ ✓ Jim Bacchus (Democratic) 50.7%; ▌Bill Tolley (Republican) 49.3%
Florida 16	Tom Lewis; Redistricted from the 12th district	Republican	1982	Incumbent re-elected.	▌ ✓ Tom Lewis (Republican) 60.8%; ▌John Comerford (Democratic) 39.2%
Florida 17	William Lehman	Democratic	1972	Incumbent retired. Democratic hold.	▌ ✓ Carrie Meek (Democratic); Uncontested
Florida 18	Ileana Ros-Lehtinen	Republican	1989 (special)	Incumbent re-elected.	▌ ✓ Ileana Ros-Lehtinen (Republican) 66.8%; ▌Magda Montiel Davis (Democratic) 33.2%
Florida 19	Harry Johnston; Redistricted from the 14th district	Democratic	1988	Incumbent re-elected.	▌ ✓ Harry Johnston (Democratic) 63.1%; ▌Larry Metz (Republican) 36.9%
Florida 20	Dante Fascell; Redistricted from the 19th district	Democratic	1954	Incumbent retired. Democratic hold.	▌ ✓ Peter Deutsch (Democratic) 55.1%; ▌Beverly Kennedy (Republican) 38.5%; ▌James Blackburn (Independent) 6.4%
Florida 21	None (District created)			New seat. Republican gain.	▌ ✓ Lincoln Díaz-Balart (Republican); Uncontested
Florida 22	Clay Shaw; Redistricted from the 15th district	Republican	1980	Incumbent re-elected.	▌ ✓ Clay Shaw (Republican) 52.0%; ▌Gwen Margolis (Democratic) 37.1%; ▌Richard Stephens (Independent) 6.3%; ▌Michael Petrie (Independent) 2.6%; ▌Bernard Anscher (Independent) 2.1%
Florida 22	Lawrence J. Smith; Redistricted from the 16th district	Democratic	1982	Incumbent retired. Democratic loss.	▌ ✓ Clay Shaw (Republican) 52.0%; ▌Gwen Margolis (Democratic) 37.1%; ▌Richard Stephens (Independent) 6.3%; ▌Michael Petrie (Independent) 2.6%; ▌Bernard Anscher (Independent) 2.1%
Florida 23	None (District created)			New seat. Democratic gain.	▌ ✓ Alcee Hastings (Democratic) 58.5%; ▌Ed Fielding (Republican) 31.1%; ▌Al Woods (Independent) 10.3%

== Georgia ==
District	Incumbent			This race	
District	Member	Party	First elected	Results	Candidates
Georgia 1	Lindsay Thomas	Democratic	1982	Incumbent retired. Republican gain.	▌ ✓ Jack Kingston (Republican) 57.8%; ▌Barbara Christmas (Democratic) 42.2%
Georgia 2	Charles Hatcher	Democratic	1980	Incumbent lost renomination. Democratic hold.	▌ ✓ Sanford Bishop (Democratic) 63.7%; ▌John Clayton (Republican) 36.3%
Georgia 3	Richard Ray	Democratic	1982	Incumbent lost re-election. Republican gain.	▌ ✓ Mac Collins (Republican) 54.8%; ▌Richard Ray (Democratic) 45.2%
Georgia 4	None (New district)			New seat. Republican gain.	▌ ✓ John Linder (Republican) 50.5%; ▌Cathey Steinberg (Democratic) 49.5%
Georgia 5	John Lewis	Democratic	1986	Incumbent re-elected.	▌ ✓ John Lewis (Democratic) 72.1%; ▌Paul Stabler (Republican) 27.9%
Georgia 6	Newt Gingrich	Republican	1978	Incumbent re-elected.	▌ ✓ Newt Gingrich (Republican) 57.7%; ▌Tony Center (Democratic) 42.3%
Georgia 7	Buddy Darden	Democratic	1983	Incumbent re-elected.	▌ ✓ Buddy Darden (Democratic) 57.3%; ▌Al Beverly (Republican) 42.7%
Georgia 8	J. Roy Rowland	Democratic	1982	Incumbent re-elected.	▌ ✓ J. Roy Rowland (Democratic) 55.7%; ▌Bob Cunningham (Republican) 44.3%
Georgia 9	Ed Jenkins	Democratic	1976	Incumbent retired. Democratic hold.	▌ ✓ Nathan Deal (Democratic) 59.2%; ▌Daniel Becker (Republican) 40.8%
Georgia 10	Doug Barnard Jr.	Democratic	1976	Incumbent retired. Democratic loss.	▌ ✓ Don Johnson Jr. (Democratic) 53.8%; ▌Ralph Hudgens (Republican) 46.2%
Georgia 10	Ben Jones; Redistricted from the 4th district	Democratic	1988	Incumbent lost renomination. Democratic hold.	▌ ✓ Don Johnson Jr. (Democratic) 53.8%; ▌Ralph Hudgens (Republican) 46.2%
Georgia 11	None (New district)			New seat. Democratic gain.	▌ ✓ Cynthia McKinney (Democratic) 73.1%; ▌Woodrow Lovett (Republican) 26.9%

== Hawaii ==
District	Incumbent			This race	
District	Member	Party	First elected	Results	Candidates
Hawaii 1	Neil Abercrombie	Democratic	1986 (special); 1988 (lost renomination); 1990	Incumbent re-elected.	▌ ✓ Neil Abercrombie (Democratic) 72.9%; ▌Warner Sutton (Republican) 23.4%; ▌Rockne Hart Johnson (Libertarian) 3.7%
Hawaii 2	Patsy Mink	Democratic	1964; 1976 (retired); 1990 (special)	Incumbent re-elected.	▌ ✓ Patsy Mink (Democratic) 72.6%; ▌Kamuela Price (Republican) 22.1%; ▌Jeff Mallan (Libertarian) 5.2%

== Idaho ==
District	Incumbent			This race	
District	Member	Party	First elected	Results	Candidates
Idaho 1	Larry LaRocco	Democratic	1990	Incumbent re-elected.	▌ ✓ Larry LaRocco (Democratic) 58.1%; ▌Rachel Gilbert (Republican) 37.4%; ▌John Abel (Independent) 2.6%; ▌Henry Kinsey (Independent) 1.9%
Idaho 2	Richard H. Stallings	Democratic	1984	Retired to run for U.S. senator. Republican gain.	▌ ✓ Mike Crapo (Republican) 60.8%; ▌J.D. Williams (Democratic) 35.4%; ▌Steven Kauer (Independent) 2.1%; ▌David William Mansfield (Independent) 1.7%

== Illinois ==
Illinois lost two seats due to reapportionment.

District	Incumbent			This race	
District	Member	Party	First elected	Results	Candidates
Illinois 1	Charles Hayes	Democratic	1984	Incumbent lost renomination. Democratic hold.	▌ ✓ Bobby Rush (Democratic) 82.8%; ▌Jay Walker (Republican) 17.2%
Illinois 2	Gus Savage	Democratic	1980	Incumbent lost renomination. Democratic hold.	▌ ✓ Mel Reynolds (Democratic) 78.1%; ▌Ron Blackstone (Republican) 13.7%; ▌Louanner Peters (Independent) 8.2%
Illinois 3	Marty Russo	Democratic	1974	Incumbent lost renomination. Democratic loss.	▌ ✓ Bill Lipinski (Democratic) 63.5%; ▌Harry C. Lepinske (Republican) 36.5%
Illinois 3	Bill Lipinski; Redistricted from the 5th district	Democratic	1982	Incumbent re-elected.	▌ ✓ Bill Lipinski (Democratic) 63.5%; ▌Harry C. Lepinske (Republican) 36.5%
Illinois 4	None (District created)			New seat. Democratic gain.	▌ ✓ Luis Gutiérrez (Democratic) 77.6%; ▌Hildegarde Rodriguez-Schieman (Republican) 22.4%
Illinois 5	Dan Rostenkowski; Redistricted from the 8th district	Democratic	1958	Incumbent re-elected.	▌ ✓ Dan Rostenkowski (Democratic) 57.3%; ▌Elias R. Zenkich (Republican) 39.1%; ▌Blaise C. Grenke (Libertarian) 3.6%
Illinois 5	Frank Annunzio; Redistricted from the 11th district	Democratic	1964	Incumbent retired. Democratic loss.	▌ ✓ Dan Rostenkowski (Democratic) 57.3%; ▌Elias R. Zenkich (Republican) 39.1%; ▌Blaise C. Grenke (Libertarian) 3.6%
Illinois 6	Henry Hyde	Republican	1974	Incumbent re-elected.	▌ ✓ Henry Hyde (Republican) 65.5%; ▌Barry W. Watkins (Democratic) 34.5%
Illinois 7	Cardiss Collins	Democratic	1973 (special)	Incumbent re-elected.	▌ ✓ Cardiss Collins (Democratic) 81.1%; ▌Norman G. Boccio (Republican) 15.7%; ▌Rose-Marie Love (Economic Recovery) 2.1%; ▌Geri Knoll McLauchlan (Natural Law) 1.1%
Illinois 8	Phil Crane; Redistricted from the 12th district	Republican	1969 (special)	Incumbent re-elected.	▌ ✓ Phil Crane (Republican) 55.7%; ▌Sheila A. Smith (Democratic) 40.4%; ▌Joe M. Dillier (Independent) 3.9%
Illinois 9	Sidney R. Yates	Democratic	1948; 1962 (retired); 1964	Incumbent re-elected.	▌ ✓ Sidney R. Yates (Democratic) 68.0%; ▌Herb Sohn (Republican) 27.0%; ▌Sheila A. Jones (Economic Recovery) 5.0%
Illinois 10	John Porter	Republican	1980	Incumbent re-elected.	▌ ✓ John Porter (Republican) 64.5%; ▌Michael J. Kennedy (Democratic) 35.5%
Illinois 11	George Sangmeister; Redistricted from the 4th district	Democratic	1988	Incumbent re-elected.	▌ ✓ George Sangmeister (Democratic) 55.7%; ▌Robert T. Herbolsheimer (Republican) 44.3%
Illinois 12	Jerry Costello; Redistricted from the 21st district	Democratic	1988	Incumbent re-elected.	▌ ✓ Jerry Costello (Democratic) 71.2%; ▌Mike Starr (Republican) 28.8%
Illinois 13	Harris Fawell	Republican	1984	Incumbent re-elected.	▌ ✓ Harris Fawell (Republican) 68.4%; ▌Dennis Michael Temple (Democratic) 31.6%
Illinois 14	Dennis Hastert	Republican	1986	Incumbent re-elected.	▌ ✓ Dennis Hastert (Republican) 67.3%; ▌Jonathan Abram Reich (Democratic) 32.6%
Illinois 15	Tom Ewing	Republican	1991 (special)	Incumbent re-elected.	▌ ✓ Tom Ewing (Republican) 59.3%; ▌Charles D. Mattis (Democratic) 40.6%
Illinois 16	John W. Cox Jr.	Democratic	1990	Incumbent lost re-election. Republican gain.	▌ ✓ Don Manzullo (Republican) 55.6%; ▌John W. Cox Jr. (Democratic) 44.4%
Illinois 17	Lane Evans	Democratic	1982	Incumbent re-elected.	▌ ✓ Lane Evans (Democratic) 60.1%; ▌Ken Schloemer (Republican) 39.9%
Illinois 18	Robert H. Michel	Republican	1956	Incumbent re-elected.	▌ ✓ Robert H. Michel (Republican) 57.8%; ▌Ronald C. Hawkins (Democratic) 42.2%
Illinois 19	Terry L. Bruce	Democratic	1984	Incumbent lost renomination. Democratic loss.	▌ ✓ Glenn Poshard (Democratic) 69.1%; ▌Douglas E. Lee (Republican) 30.9%
Illinois 19	Glenn Poshard; Redistricted from the 22nd district	Democratic	1988	Incumbent re-elected.	▌ ✓ Glenn Poshard (Democratic) 69.1%; ▌Douglas E. Lee (Republican) 30.9%
Illinois 20	Dick Durbin	Democratic	1982	Incumbent re-elected.	▌ ✓ Dick Durbin (Democratic) 56.5%; ▌John Shimkus (Republican) 43.5%

== Indiana ==
District	Incumbent			This race	
District	Member	Party	First elected	Results	Candidates
Indiana 1	Pete Visclosky	Democratic	1984	Incumbent re-elected.	▌ ✓ Pete Visclosky (Democratic) 69.4%; ▌David J. Vucich (Republican) 30.6%
Indiana 2	Philip Sharp	Democratic	1974	Incumbent re-elected.	▌ ✓ Philip Sharp (Democratic) 57.1%; ▌Bill Frazier (Republican) 39.5%; ▌Ted Shaver (Independent) 3.4%
Indiana 3	Tim Roemer	Democratic	1990	Incumbent re-elected.	▌ ✓ Tim Roemer (Democratic) 57.4%; ▌Carl H. Baxmeyer (Republican) 42.6%
Indiana 4	Jill Long	Democratic	1988	Incumbent re-elected.	▌ ✓ Jill Long (Democratic) 62.1%; ▌Chuck Pierson (Republican) 37.9%
Indiana 5	Jim Jontz	Democratic	1986	Incumbent lost re-election. Republican gain.	▌ ✓ Steve Buyer (Republican) 51.0%; ▌Jim Jontz (Democratic) 49.0%
Indiana 6	Dan Burton	Republican	1982	Incumbent re-elected.	▌ ✓ Dan Burton (Republican) 72.2%; ▌Natalie M. Bruner (Democratic) 27.8%
Indiana 7	John T. Myers	Republican	1966	Incumbent re-elected.	▌ ✓ John T. Myers (Republican) 59.5%; ▌Ellen E. Wedum (Democratic) 40.5%
Indiana 8	Frank McCloskey	Democratic	1982	Incumbent re-elected.	▌ ✓ Frank McCloskey (Democratic) 52.5%; ▌Richard Mourdock (Republican) 45.3%; ▌John W. Taylor (Independent) 1.3%; ▌Jimmy Funkhouser (Libertarian) 0.8%
Indiana 9	Lee Hamilton	Democratic	1964	Incumbent re-elected.	▌ ✓ Lee Hamilton (Democratic) 69.7%; ▌Michael E. Bailey (Republican) 30.3%
Indiana 10	Andrew Jacobs Jr.	Democratic	1964; 1972 (defeated); 1974	Incumbent re-elected.	▌ ✓ Andrew Jacobs Jr. (Democratic) 64.0%; ▌János Horváth (Republican) 35.0%; ▌Carolyn P. Sackett (New Alliance) 1.0%

== Iowa ==
One seat was lost due to reapportionment.

District	Incumbent			This race	
District	Member	Party	First elected	Results	Candidates
Iowa 1	Jim Leach	Republican	1976	Incumbent re-elected.	▌ ✓ Jim Leach (Republican) 68.1%; ▌Jan J. Zonneveld (Democratic) 31.2%
Iowa 2	Jim Nussle	Republican	1990	Incumbent re-elected.	▌ ✓ Jim Nussle (Republican) 50.2%; ▌David R. Nagle (Democratic) 49.1%; ▌Albert W. Schoeman (Grassroots) 0.7%
Iowa 2	David R. Nagle; Redistricted from the 3rd district	Democratic	1986	Incumbent lost re-election. Democratic loss.	▌ ✓ Jim Nussle (Republican) 50.2%; ▌David R. Nagle (Democratic) 49.1%; ▌Albert W. Schoeman (Grassroots) 0.7%
Iowa 3	Jim Ross Lightfoot; Redistricted from the 5th district	Republican	1984	Incumbent re-elected.	▌ ✓ Jim Ross Lightfoot (Republican) 48.9%; ▌Elaine Baxter (Democratic) 47.1%; ▌Larry Chroman (Natural Law) 4.0%
Iowa 4	Neal Smith	Democratic	1958	Incumbent re-elected.	▌ ✓ Neal Smith (Democratic) 61.6%; ▌Paul Lunde (Republican) 36.5%; Others: ▌Jerry Yellin (Natural Law) 0.9%; ▌William C. Oviatt (Grassroots) 0.9%
Iowa 5	Fred Grandy; Redistricted from the 6th district	Republican	1986	Incumbent re-elected.	▌ ✓ Fred Grandy (Republican) 99.3%

== Kansas ==
One seat was lost due to reapportionment.

District	Incumbent			This race	
District	Member	Party	First elected	Results	Candidates
Kansas 1	Pat Roberts	Republican	1980	Incumbent re-elected.	▌ ✓ Pat Roberts (Republican) 68.3%; ▌Duane West (Democratic) 29.3%; ▌Steven A. Rosile (Libertarian) 2.4%
Kansas 2	Jim Slattery	Democratic	1982	Incumbent re-elected.	▌ ✓ Jim Slattery (Democratic) 56.2%; ▌Jim Van Slyke (Republican) 40.8%; ▌Arthur L. Clack (Libertarian) 3.0%
Kansas 3	Jan Meyers	Republican	1984	Incumbent re-elected.	▌ ✓ Jan Meyers (Republican) 58.0%; ▌Tom Love (Democratic) 37.6%; ▌Frank Kaul (Libertarian) 4.4%
Kansas 4	Dan Glickman	Democratic	1976	Incumbent re-elected.	▌ ✓ Dan Glickman (Democratic) 51.7%; ▌Eric R. Yost (Republican) 42.1%; ▌Seth L. Warren (Libertarian) 6.2%
Kansas 4	Dick Nichols; Redistricted from the 5th district	Republican	1990	Incumbent lost renomination. Republican loss.	▌ ✓ Dan Glickman (Democratic) 51.7%; ▌Eric R. Yost (Republican) 42.1%; ▌Seth L. Warren (Libertarian) 6.2%

== Kentucky ==
District	Incumbent			This race	
District	Member	Party	First elected	Results	Candidates
Kentucky 1	Carroll Hubbard	Democratic	1974	Incumbent lost renomination. Democratic hold.	▌ ✓ Thomas Barlow (Democratic) 60.5%; ▌Steve Hamrick (Republican) 39.1%; ▌Marvin Seat (Reform) 0.4%
Kentucky 2	William Natcher	Democratic	1953 (Special)	Incumbent re-elected.	▌ ✓ William Natcher (Democratic) 61.4%; ▌Bruce Bartley (Republican) 38.6%
Kentucky 3	Romano Mazzoli	Democratic	1970	Incumbent re-elected.	▌ ✓ Romano Mazzoli (Democratic) 52.7%; ▌Susan Stokes (Republican) 47.3%
Kentucky 4	Jim Bunning	Republican	1986	Incumbent re-elected.	▌ ✓ Jim Bunning (Republican) 61.6%; ▌Sally Harris Skaggs (Democratic) 38.4%
Kentucky 5	Hal Rogers	Republican	1980	Incumbent re-elected.	▌ ✓ Hal Rogers (Republican) 54.6%; ▌John Doug Hays (Democratic) 45.4%
Kentucky 5	Chris Perkins; Redistricted from the 7th district	Democratic	1984	Incumbent retired. Democratic loss.	▌ ✓ Hal Rogers (Republican) 54.6%; ▌John Doug Hays (Democratic) 45.4%
Kentucky 6	Larry J. Hopkins	Republican	1978	Incumbent retired. Democratic gain.	▌ ✓ Scotty Baesler (Democratic) 60.7%; ▌Charles Ellinger (Republican) 39.3%

== Louisiana ==
One seat lost to reapportionment. Four Incumbents were squeezed into two districts and one new majority-black district was created. Livingston, Jefferson, Tauzin and Hayes were re-elected with majorities in their Oct. 3 jungle primaries.

District	Incumbent			This race	
District	Member	Party	First elected	Results	Candidates (and runoff results)
Louisiana 1	Bob Livingston	Republican	1977 (Special)	Incumbent re-elected.	▌ ✓ Bob Livingston (Republican) 72.7%; ▌Anne Thompson (Republican) 10.1%; ▌Vincent Bruno (Republican) 6.8%; ▌Richie Martin (Republican) 4.2%; ▌Jules Hillery (Independent) 3.9%; ▌Greg Reinhard (Independent) 2.3%
Louisiana 2	William J. Jefferson	Democratic	1990	Incumbent re-elected.	▌ ✓ William J. Jefferson (Democratic) 73.4%; ▌Wilma Knox Irvin (Democratic) 15.5%; ▌Roger C. Johnson (Independent) 11.1%
Louisiana 3	Billy Tauzin	Democratic	1980	Incumbent re-elected.	▌ ✓ Billy Tauzin (Democratic) 81.7%; ▌Paul Boynton (Republican) 18.3%
Louisiana 4	None (District created)			New seat. Democratic gain.	▌ ✓ Cleo Fields (Democratic) 47.8% (73.9%); ▌Charles Jones (Democratic) 14.0% (26.1%); ▌Joe Shyne (Democratic) 10.8%; ▌Faye Williams (Democratic) 8.6%; ▌Steve Myers (Republican) 7.8%; ▌Emile Ventre (Republican) 6.9%; ▌James Ross (Democratic) 2.1%; ▌Ralph Hall (Democratic) 2.0%
Louisiana 5	Jim McCrery; Redistricted from the 4th district	Republican	1988	Incumbent re-elected.	▌ ✓ Jim McCrery (Republican) 44.1% (63.0%); ▌Jerry Huckaby (Democratic) 29.4% (37.0%); ▌Robert Thompson (Democratic) 22.4%; ▌Nota Knox (Independent) 2.1%; ▌Donal Milton (Republican) 1.9%
Louisiana 5	Jerry Huckaby	Democratic	1976	Incumbent lost re-election. Democratic loss.	▌ ✓ Jim McCrery (Republican) 44.1% (63.0%); ▌Jerry Huckaby (Democratic) 29.4% (37.0%); ▌Robert Thompson (Democratic) 22.4%; ▌Nota Knox (Independent) 2.1%; ▌Donal Milton (Republican) 1.9%
Louisiana 6	Richard Baker	Republican	1986	Incumbent re-elected.	▌ ✓ Richard Baker (Republican) 33.1% (50.6%); ▌Clyde C. Holloway (Republican) 36.7% (49.4%); ▌Ned Randolph (Democratic) 30.2%
Louisiana 6	Clyde C. Holloway; Redistricted from the 8th district	Republican	1986	Incumbent lost re-election. Republican loss.	▌ ✓ Richard Baker (Republican) 33.1% (50.6%); ▌Clyde C. Holloway (Republican) 36.7% (49.4%); ▌Ned Randolph (Democratic) 30.2%
Louisiana 7	Jimmy Hayes	Democratic	1986	Incumbent re-elected.	▌ ✓ Jimmy Hayes (Democratic) 73.0%; ▌Fredric Hayes (Republican) 20.7%; ▌Bob Nain (Republican) 6.2%

== Maine ==
District	Incumbent			This race	
District	Member	Party	First elected	Results	Candidates
Maine 1	Thomas Andrews	Democratic	1990	Incumbent re-elected.	▌ ✓ Thomas Andrews (Democratic) 65.0%; ▌Linda Bean (Republican) 35.0%
Maine 2	Olympia Snowe	Republican	1978	Incumbent re-elected.	▌ ✓ Olympia Snowe (Republican) 49.1%; ▌Patrick K. McGowan (Democratic) 42.0%; ▌Jonathan Carter (Green) 8.8%

== Maryland ==
District	Incumbent			This race	
District	Member	Party	First elected	Results	Candidates
Maryland 1	Wayne Gilchrest	Republican	1990	Incumbent re-elected.	▌ ✓ Wayne Gilchrest (Republican) 51.6%; ▌Tom McMillen (Democratic) 48.4%
Maryland 1	Tom McMillen; Redistricted from the 4th district	Democratic	1986	Incumbent lost reelection. Democratic loss.	▌ ✓ Wayne Gilchrest (Republican) 51.6%; ▌Tom McMillen (Democratic) 48.4%
Maryland 2	Helen Delich Bentley	Republican	1984	Incumbent re-elected.	▌ ✓ Helen Delich Bentley (Republican) 65.1%; ▌Michael Hickey Jr. (Democratic) 34.9%
Maryland 3	Ben Cardin	Democratic	1986	Incumbent re-elected.	▌ ✓ Ben Cardin (Democratic) 73.5%; ▌William Bricker (Republican) 26.5%
Maryland 4	None (District created)			New seat. Democratic gain.	▌ ✓ Albert Wynn (Democratic) 75.2%; ▌Michele Dyson (Republican) 24.8%
Maryland 5	Steny Hoyer	Democratic	1981	Incumbent re-elected.	▌ ✓ Steny Hoyer (Democratic) 53.0%; ▌Larry Hogan (Republican) 43.9%; ▌William Johnston (Independent) 3.1%
Maryland 6	Beverly Byron	Democratic	1978	Incumbent lost renomination. Republican gain.	▌ ✓ Roscoe Bartlett (Republican) 54.2%; ▌Thomas Hattery (Democratic) 45.8%
Maryland 7	Kweisi Mfume	Democratic	1986	Incumbent re-elected.	▌ ✓ Kweisi Mfume (Democratic) 85.3%; ▌Kenneth Kondner (Republican) 14.7%
Maryland 8	Connie Morella	Republican	1986	Incumbent re-elected.	▌ ✓ Connie Morella (Republican) 72.5%; ▌Edward Heffernan (Democratic) 27.5%

== Massachusetts ==
Massachusetts lost one seat due to reapportionment.

District	Incumbent			This race	
District	Member	Party	First elected	Results	Candidates
Massachusetts 1	John Olver	Democratic	June 18, 1991 (Special)	Incumbent re-elected.	▌ ✓ John Olver (Democratic) 51.5%; ▌Patrick Larkin (Republican) 43.4%; ▌Louis R. Godena (Independent) 2.7%; ▌Dennis M. Kelly (Independent) 1.7%; ▌Jeffrey W. Rebello (LaRouche) 0.6%
Massachusetts 2	Richard Neal	Democratic	1988	Incumbent re-elected.	▌ ✓ Richard Neal (Democratic) 53.1%; ▌Anthony W. Ravosa (Republican) 31.1%; ▌Thomas R. Sheehan (Independent) 15.8%
Massachusetts 3	Joseph D. Early	Democratic	1974	Incumbent lost re-election. Republican gain.	▌ ✓ Peter Blute (Republican) 50.4%; ▌Joseph D. Early (Democratic) 44.3%; ▌Leonard J. Umina (Independent) 3.7%; ▌Michael T. Moore (Natural Law) 1.6%
Massachusetts 4	Barney Frank	Democratic	1980	Incumbent re-elected.	▌ ✓ Barney Frank (Democratic) 67.7%; ▌Edward J. McCormick III (Republican) 26.2%; ▌Luke Lumina (Independent) 5.1%; ▌Dennis J. Ingalls (LaRouche) 1.0%
Massachusetts 5	Chester G. Atkins	Democratic	1984	Incumbent lost renomination. Democratic hold.	▌ ✓ Marty Meehan (Democratic) 52.2%; ▌Paul W. Cronin (Republican) 37.5%; ▌Mary Farinelli (Independent) 7.4%; ▌David E. Coleman (Independent) 2.8%
Massachusetts 6	Nicholas Mavroules	Democratic	1978	Incumbent lost re-election. Republican gain.	▌ ✓ Peter G. Torkildsen (Republican) 54.8%; ▌Nicholas Mavroules (Democratic) 44.9%
Massachusetts 7	Ed Markey	Democratic	1976	Incumbent re-elected.	▌ ✓ Ed Markey (Democratic) 62.1%; ▌Stephen A. Sohn (Republican) 27.8%; ▌Robert B. Antonelli (Independent) 10.1%
Massachusetts 8	Joseph P. Kennedy II	Democratic	1986	Incumbent re-elected.	▌ ✓ Joseph P. Kennedy II (Democratic) 83.1%; ▌Alice Harriett Nakash (Independent) 16.8%
Massachusetts 9	Joe Moakley	Democratic	1972	Incumbent re-elected.	▌Joe Moakley (Democratic) 69.2%; ▌Martin D. Conboy (Republican) 21.4%; ▌Lawrence C. Mackin (Independent) 6.2%; ▌Robert W. Horan (Independent) 3.2%
Massachusetts 9	Brian J. Donnelly; Redistricted from the 11th district	Democratic	1978	Incumbent retired. Democratic loss.	▌Joe Moakley (Democratic) 69.2%; ▌Martin D. Conboy (Republican) 21.4%; ▌Lawrence C. Mackin (Independent) 6.2%; ▌Robert W. Horan (Independent) 3.2%
Massachusetts 10	Gerry Studds	Democratic	1972	Incumbent re-elected.	▌ ✓ Gerry Studds (Democratic) 60.8%; ▌Daniel W. Daly (Republican) 24.4%; ▌Jon L. Bryan (Independent) 12.6%; ▌Michael P. Umina (Independent) 1.9%; ▌Robert W. Knapp (LaRouche) 0.4%

== Michigan ==
Michigan lost two seats to reapportionment.

District	Incumbent			This race	
District	Member	Party	First elected	Results	Candidates
Michigan 1	Robert William Davis; Redistricted from the 11th district	Republican	1978	Incumbent retired. Democratic gain.	▌ ✓ Bart Stupak (Democratic) 53.9%; ▌Philip Ruppe (Republican) 43.6%; ▌Gerald Aylott (Libertarian) 1.5%; ▌Lyman Clark (Natural Law) 1.0%
Michigan 2	Guy Vander Jagt; Redistricted from the 9th district	Republican	1966	Incumbent lost renomination. Republican hold.	▌ ✓ Pete Hoekstra (Republican) 63.0%; ▌John H. Miltner (Democratic) 35.0%; ▌Dick Jacobs (Libertarian) 2.0%
Michigan 3	Paul B. Henry; Redistricted from the 5th district	Republican	1984	Incumbent re-elected.	▌ ✓ Paul B. Henry (Republican) 61.3%; ▌Carol S. Kooistra (Democratic) 38.2%; ▌Richard Whitelock (Libertarian) 1.2%; ▌Susan H. Normandin (Natural Law) 1.2%
Michigan 4	Dave Camp; Redistricted from the 10th district	Republican	1990	Incumbent re-elected.	▌ ✓ Dave Camp (Republican) 62.5%; ▌Lisa A. Donaldson (Democratic) 34.8%; ▌Joan Dennison (Tisch Ind. Citizens) 1.3%; Others: ▌Gary R. Bradley (Libertarian) 0.8%; ▌Thomas E. List (Natural Law) 0.5%
Michigan 5	J. Bob Traxler; Redistricted from the 8th district	Democratic	1974	Incumbent retired. Democratic hold.	▌ ✓ James Barcia (Democratic) 60.3%; ▌Keith Muxlow (Republican) 38.0%; ▌Lloyd Clarke (Workers World) 1.7%
Michigan 6	Fred Upton; Redistricted from the 4th district	Republican	1986	Incumbent re-elected.	▌ ✓ Fred Upton (Republican) 61.8%; ▌Andy Davis (Democratic) 38.2%
Michigan 6	Howard Wolpe; Redistricted from the 3rd district	Democratic	1978	Incumbent retired. Democratic loss.	▌ ✓ Fred Upton (Republican) 61.8%; ▌Andy Davis (Democratic) 38.2%
Michigan 7	Carl Pursell; Redistricted from the 2nd district	Republican	1976	Incumbent retired. Republican hold.	▌ ✓ Nick Smith (Republican) 87.6%; ▌Kenneth L. Proctor (Libertarian) 12.3%
Michigan 8	Bob Carr; Redistricted from the 6th district	Democratic	1974; 1980 (defeated); 1982	Incumbent re-elected.	▌ ✓ Bob Carr (Democratic) 47.6%; ▌Dick Chrysler (Republican) 46.3%; ▌Frank D. McAlpine (Independent) 4.3%; ▌Michael E. Marotta (Libertarian) 1.8%
Michigan 9	Dale Kildee; Redistricted from the 7th district	Democratic	1976	Incumbent re-elected.	▌ ✓ Dale Kildee (Democratic) 53.7%; ▌Megan O'Neill (Republican) 44.8%; Others: ▌Key Halverson (Natural Law) 0.8%; ▌Jerome S. White (Workers League) 0.8%
Michigan 10	David Bonior; Redistricted from the 12th district	Democratic	1976	Incumbent re-elected.	▌ ✓ David Bonior (Democratic) 53.1%; ▌Douglas Carl (Republican) 44.2%; ▌David A. Weidner (Libertarian) 2.7%
Michigan 11	William Broomfield; Redistricted from the 18th district	Republican	1956	Incumbent retired. Republican hold.	▌ ✓ Joe Knollenberg (Republican) 57.6%; ▌Walter Briggs (Democratic) 40.2%; ▌Brian Richard Wright (Libertarian) 1.4%; ▌Henry Ogden Clark (Natural Law) 0.8%
Michigan 12	Sander Levin; Redistricted from the 17th district	Democratic	1982	Incumbent re-elected.	▌Sander Levin (Democratic) 52.6%; ▌John Pappageorge (Republican) 45.7%; ▌Charles Hahn (Libertarian) 1.1%; ▌R. W. Montgomery (Natural Law) 0.8%
Michigan 12	Dennis Hertel; Redistricted from the 14th district	Democratic	1980	Incumbent retired. Democratic loss.	▌Sander Levin (Democratic) 52.6%; ▌John Pappageorge (Republican) 45.7%; ▌Charles Hahn (Libertarian) 1.1%; ▌R. W. Montgomery (Natural Law) 0.8%
Michigan 13	William D. Ford; Redistricted from the 15th district	Democratic	1964	Incumbent re-elected.	▌ ✓ William D. Ford (Democratic) 51.9%; ▌R. Robert Geake (Republican) 42.8%; ▌Randall F. Roe (Independent) 3.5%; ▌Paul Steven Jensen (Tisch Ind. Citizens) 1.3%; ▌Larry Roberts (Workers League) 0.5%
Michigan 14	John Conyers; Redistricted from the 1st district	Democratic	1964	Incumbent re-elected.	▌ ✓ John Conyers (Democratic) 82.4%; ▌John W. Gordon (Republican) 15.9%; ▌Richard R. Miller (Natural Law) 1.0%; ▌Dartagnan Collier (Workers League) 0.6%
Michigan 15	Barbara-Rose Collins; Redistricted from the 13th district	Democratic	1990	Incumbent re-elected.	▌ ✓ Barbara-Rose Collins (Democratic) 80.5%; ▌Charles C. Vincent (Republican) 17.2%; ▌James E. Harris Jr. (Independent) 1.5%; ▌Jane Walker Meade (Libertarian) 0.8%
Michigan 16	John Dingell	Democratic	1955 (special)	Incumbent re-elected.	▌ ✓ John Dingell (Democratic) 65.1%; ▌Frank Beaumont (Republican) 31.4%; ▌Max J. Siegel (Tisch Ind. Citizens) 1.7%; Others: ▌Jeff Hampton (Libertarian) 1.0%; ▌Martin P. McLaughlin (Workers League) 0.8%

== Minnesota ==
District	Incumbent			This race	
District	Member	Party	First elected	Results	Candidates
Minnesota 1	Tim Penny	DFL	1982	Incumbent re-elected.	▌ ✓ Tim Penny (DFL) 73.9%; ▌Tim Droogsma (Ind.-Republican) 25.9%
Minnesota 2	Vin Weber	Independent- Republican	1980	Incumbent retired. DFL gain.	▌ ✓ David Minge (DFL) 47.9%; ▌Cal Ludeman (Ind.-Republican) 47.4%; ▌Stan Bentz (Independent) 4.4%
Minnesota 3	Jim Ramstad	Independent- Republican	1990	Incumbent re-elected.	▌ ✓ Jim Ramstad (Ind.-Republican) 63.8%; ▌Paul Mandell (DFL) 33.3%; ▌Dwight Fellman (Grassroots) 2.9%
Minnesota 4	Bruce Vento	DFL	1976	Incumbent re-elected.	▌ ✓ Bruce Vento (DFL) 57.6%; ▌Ian Maitland (Ind.-Republican) 37.6%; ▌James Willess (Independent) 2.4%; ▌Dan Vacek (Grassroots) 1.6%; ▌Lynn M. Johnson (Natural Law) 1.3%; ▌Jo Rothenberg (Socialist Workers) 0.4%
Minnesota 5	Martin Olav Sabo	DFL	1978	Incumbent re-elected.	▌ ✓ Martin Olav Sabo (DFL) 63.0%; ▌Stephen Moriarty (Ind.-Republican) 27.9%; ▌Russell Bentley (Grassroots) 2.5%; ▌Sandra Coleman (New Alliance) 2.1%; ▌Mary Mellen (Natural Law) 2.0%; ▌Glenn Mesaros (Independent) 1.7%; ▌Jo Rothenberg (Socialist Workers) 0.7%
Minnesota 6	Gerry Sikorski	DFL	1982	Incumbent lost re-election. Independent-Republican gain.	▌ ✓ Rod Grams (Ind.-Republican) 44.4%; ▌Gerry Sikorski (DFL) 33.2%; ▌Dean Barkley (Independence) 16.1%; ▌James H. Peterson (Independent) 5.5%; ▌Tom Firnstahl (Natural Law) 0.8%
Minnesota 7	Collin Peterson	DFL	1990	Incumbent re-elected.	▌ ✓ Collin Peterson (DFL) 50.4%; ▌Bernie Omann (Ind.-Republican) 49.1%
Minnesota 8	Jim Oberstar	DFL	1974	Incumbent re-elected.	▌ ✓ Jim Oberstar (DFL) 59.0%; ▌Phil Herwig (Ind.-Republican) 29.6%; ▌Harry Robb Weltry (Perot Choice) 8.0%; ▌Floyd Henspeter (Term Limits) 3.0%

== Mississippi ==
District	Incumbent			This race	
District	Member	Party	First elected	Results	Candidates
Mississippi 1	Jamie Whitten	Democratic	1941	Incumbent re-elected.	▌ ✓ Jamie Whitten (Democratic) 59.5%; ▌Clyde E. Whitaker (Republican) 40.5%
Mississippi 2	Mike Espy	Democratic	1986	Incumbent re-elected.	▌ ✓ Mike Espy (Democratic) 76.4%; ▌Dorothy Benford (Republican) 23.6%
Mississippi 3	Sonny Montgomery	Democratic	1966	Incumbent re-elected.	▌ ✓ Sonny Montgomery (Democratic) 81.2%; ▌Michael E. Williams (Republican) 18.8%
Mississippi 4	Michael Parker	Democratic	1988	Incumbent re-elected.	▌ ✓ Michael Parker (Democratic) 67.0%; ▌Jack L. McMillan (Republican) 22.4%; ▌Liz Gilchrist (Independent) 5.4%; ▌James H. Meredith (Independent) 4.8%
Mississippi 5	Gene Taylor	Democratic	1989	Incumbent re-elected.	▌ ✓ Gene Taylor (Democratic) 67.0%; ▌Paul Harvey (Republican) 35.4%; ▌Shawn O'Hara (Independent) 1.4%

== Missouri ==
District	Incumbent			This race	
District	Member	Party	First elected	Results	Candidates
Missouri 1	Bill Clay	Democratic	1968	Incumbent re-elected.	▌ ✓ Bill Clay (Democratic) 68.1%; ▌Arthur Montgomery (Republican) 31.9%
Missouri 2	Joan Kelly Horn	Democratic	1990	Incumbent lost re-election. Republican gain.	▌ ✓ Jim Talent (Republican) 50.4%; ▌Joan Kelly Horn (Democratic) 47.6%; ▌Jim Higgins (Libertarian) 2.0%
Missouri 3	Dick Gephardt	Democratic	1976	Incumbent re-elected.	▌ ✓ Dick Gephardt (Democratic) 64.1%; ▌Mack Holekamp (Republican) 33.1%; ▌Robert Stockhausen (Libertarian) 2.8%
Missouri 4	Ike Skelton	Democratic	1976	Incumbent re-elected.	▌ ✓ Ike Skelton (Democratic) 70.3%; ▌John Carley (Republican) 29.6%
Missouri 5	Alan Wheat	Democratic	1982	Incumbent re-elected.	▌ ✓ Alan Wheat (Democratic) 59.1%; ▌Gomer Moody (Republican) 36.6%; ▌Tom Danaher (Green) 2.4%; ▌Grant Stauffer (Libertarian) 1.8%
Missouri 6	Tom Coleman	Republican	1976	Incumbent lost re-election. Democratic gain.	▌ ✓ Pat Danner (Democratic) 55.4%; ▌Tom Coleman (Republican) 44.6%
Missouri 7	Mel Hancock	Republican	1988	Incumbent re-elected.	▌ ✓ Mel Hancock (Republican) 61.6%; ▌Pat Deaton (Democratic) 38.4%
Missouri 8	Bill Emerson	Republican	1982	Incumbent re-elected.	▌ ✓ Bill Emerson (Republican) 62.9%; ▌Thad Bullock (Democratic) 37.1%
Missouri 9	Harold Volkmer	Democratic	1976	Incumbent re-elected.	▌ ✓ Harold Volkmer (Democratic) 47.7%; ▌Rick Hardy (Republican) 45.4%; ▌Jeff Barrow (Green) 4%; ▌Duane N. Burghard (Independent) 2.8%

== Montana ==
One seat was lost in reapportionment.

District	Incumbent			This race	
District	Member	Party	First elected	Results	Candidates
Montana at-large	Pat Williams; Redistricted from the 1st district	Democratic	1978	Incumbent re-elected.	▌ ✓ Pat Williams (Democratic) 50.4%; ▌Ron Marlenee (Republican) 47.0%; ▌Jerome Wilverding (Libertarian) 2.6%
Montana at-large	Ron Marlenee; Redistricted from the 2nd district	Republican	1976	Incumbent lost re-election. Republican loss.	▌ ✓ Pat Williams (Democratic) 50.4%; ▌Ron Marlenee (Republican) 47.0%; ▌Jerome Wilverding (Libertarian) 2.6%

== Nebraska ==
District	Incumbent			This race	
District	Member	Party	First elected	Results	Candidates
Nebraska 1	Doug Bereuter	Republican	1978	Incumbent re-elected.	▌ ✓ Doug Bereuter (Republican) 59.7%; ▌Gerry Finnegan (Democratic) 40.3%
Nebraska 2	Peter Hoagland	Democratic	1988	Incumbent re-elected.	▌ ✓ Peter Hoagland (Democratic) 51.2%; ▌Ronald L. Staskiewicz (Republican) 48.8%
Nebraska 3	Bill Barrett	Republican	1990	Incumbent re-elected.	▌ ✓ Bill Barrett (Republican) 71.7%; ▌Lowell Fisher (Democratic) 28.3%

== Nevada ==
District	Incumbent			This race	
District	Member	Party	First elected	Results	Candidates
Nevada 1	James Bilbray	Democratic	1986	Incumbent re-elected.	▌ ✓ James Bilbray (Democratic) 57.9%; ▌Coy Pettyjohn (Republican) 38.0%; ▌Scott A. Kjar (Libertarian) 4.1%
Nevada 2	Barbara Vucanovich	Republican	1982	Incumbent re-elected.	▌ ✓ Barbara Vucanovich (Republican) 47.9%; ▌Pete Sferrazza (Democratic) 43.3%; ▌Daniel Hansen (Independent American) 4.9%; ▌Dan Becan (Libertarian) 2.8%; ▌Don Golden (Populist) 1.1%

== New Hampshire ==
District	Incumbent			This race	
District	Member	Party	First elected	Results	Candidates
New Hampshire 1	Bill Zeliff	Republican	1990	Incumbent re-elected.	▌ ✓ Bill Zeliff (Republican) 53.2%; ▌Bob Preston (Democratic) 42.5%; ▌Knox Bickford (Libertarian) 2.2%; ▌Richard P. Bosa (Independent) 1.4%; ▌Linda Spitzfaden (Natural Law) 0.8%
New Hampshire 2	Richard N. Swett	Democratic	1990	Incumbent re-elected.	▌ ✓ Richard N. Swett (Democratic) 61.7%; ▌Bill Hatch (Republican) 35.7%; ▌John A. Lewicke (Libertarian) 2.3%; ▌James J. Bingham (Natural Law) 0.3%

== New Jersey ==
District	Incumbent			This race	
District	Member	Party	First elected	Results	Candidates
New Jersey 1	Rob Andrews	Democratic	1990	Incumbent re-elected.	▌ ✓ Rob Andrews (Democratic) 67.3%; ▌Lee Solomon (Republican) 28.6%; ▌James E. Smith (Pro-Life) 1.6%; ▌Jerry Zeldin (Libertarian) 1.2%; Others: ▌Kenneth L. Lowndes (Independent) 0.9%; ▌Nicholas Pastuch (America First Populist) 0.4%
New Jersey 2	William J. Hughes	Democratic	1974	Incumbent re-elected.	▌ ✓ William J. Hughes (Democratic) 55.9%; ▌Frank LoBiondo (Republican) 41.5%; ▌Roger W. Bacon (Libertarian) 1.1%; Others: ▌Joseph Ponczek (Anti-Tax) 0.9%; ▌Andrea Lippi (Independent) 0.7%
New Jersey 3	Jim Saxton; Redistricted from the 13th district	Republican	1984	Incumbent re-elected.	▌ ✓ Jim Saxton (Republican) 59.2%; ▌Timothy E. Ryan (Democratic) 36.8%; ▌Helen L. Radder (Libertarian) 1.1%; Others: ▌Joseph A. Plonski (America First Populist) 0.9%; ▌Michael S. Permuko (Conservative) 0.7%; ▌James Reilly (Independent) 0.4%; ▌W. Donald McMahon (Independent) 0.4%; ▌Anthony J. Verderese (Independent) 0.3%; ▌Martin T. King (Independent) 0.2%; ▌Frank Burke (Independent) 0.2%
New Jersey 4	Chris Smith	Republican	1980	Incumbent re-elected.	▌ ✓ Chris Smith (Republican) 61.8%; ▌Brian M. Hughes (Democratic) 35.0%; ▌Benjamin Grindlinger (Libertarian) 1.2%; Others: ▌Patrick C. Pasculli (Independent) 0.9%; ▌Agnes A. James (Conservative) 0.7%; ▌Joseph J. Notarangelo (America First Populist) 0.4%
New Jersey 5	Marge Roukema	Republican	1980	Incumbent re-elected.	▌ ✓ Marge Roukema (Republican) 71.5%; ▌Frank R. Lucas (Democratic) 24.6%; ▌William J. Leonard (Independent) 2.3%; Others: ▌Michael V. Pierone (Libertarian) 1.0%; ▌George Lahood (Independent) 0.4%; ▌Stuart Bacha (America First Populist) 0.3%
New Jersey 6	Bernard J. Dwyer	Democratic	1980	Incumbent retired. Democratic loss.	▌ ✓ Frank Pallone (Democratic) 52.3%; ▌Joe Kyrillos (Republican) 44.7%; Others: ▌Joseph Spalletta (Independent) 1.0%; ▌Bill Stewart (Libertarian) 0.6%; ▌Peter Cerrato (Independent) 0.5%; ▌George P. Predham (Independent) 0.4%; ▌Simone Berg (Socialist Workers) 0.3%; ▌Kenneth Matto (America First Populist) 0.2%; ▌Charles H. Dickson (Capitalist) 0.1%
New Jersey 6	Frank Pallone; Redistricted from the 3rd district	Democratic	1988	Incumbent re-elected.	▌ ✓ Frank Pallone (Democratic) 52.3%; ▌Joe Kyrillos (Republican) 44.7%; Others: ▌Joseph Spalletta (Independent) 1.0%; ▌Bill Stewart (Libertarian) 0.6%; ▌Peter Cerrato (Independent) 0.5%; ▌George P. Predham (Independent) 0.4%; ▌Simone Berg (Socialist Workers) 0.3%; ▌Kenneth Matto (America First Populist) 0.2%; ▌Charles H. Dickson (Capitalist) 0.1%
New Jersey 7	Matt Rinaldo	Republican	1990	Incumbent retired. Republican hold.	▌ ✓ Bob Franks (Republican) 53.3%; ▌Leonard R. Sendelsky (Democratic) 42.6%; ▌Eugene J. Gillespie Jr. (Independent) 1.6%; ▌Bill Campbell (Independent) 1.1%; Others: ▌Spenser Layman (Libertarian) 0.8%; ▌John L. Kucek (America First Populist) 0.3%; ▌Kevin Michael Criss (Independent) 0.3%
New Jersey 8	Robert A. Roe	Democratic	1990	Incumbent retired. Democratic hold.	▌ ✓ Herb Klein (Democratic) 47.0%; ▌Joseph Bubba (Republican) 41.1%; ▌Gloria J. Kolodziej (Independent) 7.9%; ▌Thomas Caslander (Independent) 1.4%; ▌Carmine O. Pellosie (Independent) 1.0%; Others: ▌Louis M. Stefanelli (Libertarian) 0.5%; ▌Rob Dominianni (Independent) 0.5%; ▌Jason Redrup (Socialist Workers) 0.2%; ▌Gregory E. Dzula (America First Populist) 0.2%; ▌Neal A. Gorfinkle (Independent) 0.1%
New Jersey 9	Robert Torricelli	Democratic	1982	Incumbent re-elected.	▌ ✓ Robert Torricelli (Democratic) 58.3%; ▌Patrick J. Roma (Republican) 36.9%; ▌Peter J. Russo (Independent) 1.9%; Others: ▌Gary Novosielski (Independent) 0.9%; ▌Joseph D'Alessio (America First Populist) 0.7%; ▌Herbert H. Shaw (Independent) 0.6%; ▌Daniel M. Karlan (Libertarian) 0.5%; ▌Shel Haas (Independent) 0.2%
New Jersey 10	Donald M. Payne	Democratic	1988	Incumbent re-elected.	▌ ✓ Donald M. Payne (Democratic) 78.4%; ▌Alfred D. Palermo (Republican) 20.2%; Others: ▌Roberto Caraballo (Libertarian) 0.9%; ▌William T. Leonard (Socialist Workers) 0.6%
New Jersey 11	Dean Gallo	Republican	1984	Incumbent re-elected.	▌ ✓ Dean Gallo (Republican) 70.1%; ▌Ona Spiridellis (Democratic) 25.7%; ▌Richard S. Roth (Libertarian) 1.3%; ▌Barry J. Fitzpatrick (Independent) 1.2%; Others: ▌David C. Karlen (Independent) 0.7%; ▌Howard Safier (Independent) 0.6%; ▌Richard E. Hrazanek (America First Populist) 0.4%
New Jersey 12	Dick Zimmer	Republican	1990	Incumbent re-elected.	▌ ✓ Dick Zimmer (Republican) 63.9%; ▌Frank G. Abate (Democratic) 30.4%; ▌Carl J. Mayer (Independent) 4.1%; Others: ▌Carl Peters (Libertarian) 0.7%; ▌Edward F. Eggert (Independent) 0.7%; ▌Compton C. Pakenham (America First Populist) 0.3%
New Jersey 13	Frank Joseph Guarini; Redistricted from the 14th district	Democratic	1978	Incumbent retired. Democratic hold.	▌ ✓ Bob Menendez (Democratic) 64.3%; ▌Fred J. Theemling Jr. (Republican) 30.6%; ▌Joseph D. Bonacci (Independent) 1.6%; ▌Len Flynn (Libertarian) 1.1%; ▌John E. Rummel (Communist) 1.1%; Others: ▌Jane Harris (Socialist Workers) 1.0%; ▌Donald K. Stoveken (America First Populist) 0.5%

== New Mexico ==
District	Incumbent			This race	
District	Member	Party	First elected	Results	Candidates
New Mexico 1	Steven Schiff	Republican	1988	Incumbent re-elected.	▌ ✓ Steven Schiff (Republican) 62.6%; ▌Robert J. Aragon (Democratic) 37.3%
New Mexico 2	Joe Skeen	Republican	1980	Incumbent re-elected.	▌ ✓ Joe Skeen (Republican) 56.4%; ▌Dan Sosa Jr. (Democratic) 43.5%
New Mexico 3	Bill Richardson	Democratic	1982	Incumbent re-elected.	▌ ✓ Bill Richardson (Democratic) 67.4%; ▌F. Gregg Bemis Jr. (Republican) 30.0%; ▌Ed Nagel (Libertarian) 2.6%

== New York ==
New York lost three seats in reapportionment.

District	Incumbent			This race	
District	Member	Party	First elected	Results	Candidates
New York 1	George J. Hochbrueckner	Democratic	1986	Incumbent re-elected.	▌ ✓ George J. Hochbrueckner (Democratic) 51.7%; ▌Edward P. Romaine (Republican) 48.3%
New York 2	Thomas Downey	Democratic	1974	Incumbent lost re-election. Republican gain.	▌ ✓ Rick Lazio (Republican) 53.2%; ▌Thomas Downey (Democratic) 46.8%
New York 3	Robert J. Mrazek	Democratic	1982	Incumbent retired to run for U.S. senator. Republican gain.	▌ ✓ Peter T. King (Republican) 49.6%; ▌Stephen Orlins (Democratic) 46.5%; ▌Louis P. Roccanova (Right to Life) 2.7%; ▌Ben-Zion J. Heyman (Liberal) 1.2%
New York 4	Norman F. Lent	Republican	1970	Incumbent retired. Republican hold.	▌ ✓ David A. Levy (Republican) 50.2%; ▌Philip Schiliro (Democratic) 45.5%; ▌Vincent P. Garbitelli (Right to Life) 4.3%
New York 4	Ray McGrath; Redistricted from the 5th district	Republican	1980	Incumbent retired. Republican loss.	▌ ✓ David A. Levy (Republican) 50.2%; ▌Philip Schiliro (Democratic) 45.5%; ▌Vincent P. Garbitelli (Right to Life) 4.3%
New York 5	Gary Ackerman; Redistricted from the 7th district	Democratic	1982	Incumbent re-elected.	▌ ✓ Gary Ackerman (Democratic) 52.4%; ▌Allan E. Binder (Republican) 45.0%; ▌Andrew J. Duff (Right to Life) 2.6%
New York 5	James H. Scheuer; Redistricted from the 8th district	Democratic	1964; 1972 (defeated); 1974	Incumbent retired. Democratic loss.	▌ ✓ Gary Ackerman (Democratic) 52.4%; ▌Allan E. Binder (Republican) 45.0%; ▌Andrew J. Duff (Right to Life) 2.6%
New York 6	Floyd Flake	Democratic	1986	Incumbent re-elected.	▌ ✓ Floyd Flake (Democratic) 81.0%; ▌Dianand D. Bhagwandin (Republican) 19.0%
New York 7	Thomas Manton; Redistricted from the 9th district	Democratic	1984	Incumbent re-elected.	▌ ✓ Thomas Manton (Democratic) 57.0%; ▌Dennis C. Shea (Republican) 44.0%
New York 8	Ted Weiss; Redistricted from the 17th district	Democratic	1976	Incumbent died. Democratic hold.	▌ ✓ Jerry Nadler (Democratic) 81.2%; ▌David L. Askren (Republican) 15.0%; ▌Margaret V. Byrnes (Conservative) 3.0%; ▌Arthur R. Block (New Alliance) 0.7%
New York 9	Chuck Schumer; Redistricted from the 10th district	Democratic	1980	Incumbent re-elected.	▌ ✓ Chuck Schumer (Democratic) 88.6%; ▌Alice Gaffney (Conservative) 11.4%
New York 10	Edolphus Towns; Redistricted from the 11th district	Democratic	1982	Incumbent re-elected.	▌ ✓ Edolphus Towns (Democratic) 95.8%; ▌Owen Augustin (Conservative) 4.2%
New York 11	Major Owens; Redistricted from the 12th district	Democratic	1982	Incumbent re-elected.	▌ ✓ Major Owens (Democratic) 93.6%; ▌Michael Gaffney (Conservative) 5.0%; ▌Ernest N. Foster (New Alliance) 1.4%
New York 12	Stephen Solarz; Redistricted from the 13th district	Democratic	1974	Incumbent lost renomination. Democratic hold.	▌ ✓ Nydia Velázquez (Democratic) 76.5%; ▌Angel Diaz (Republican) 20.5%; ▌Ruben Franco (Liberal) 2.1%; ▌Rafael Mendez (Natural Law) 0.8%
New York 13	Susan Molinari; Redistricted from the 14th district	Republican	1990	Incumbent re-elected.	▌ ✓ Susan Molinari (Republican) 56.1%; ▌Sal Albanese (Democratic) 38.2%; ▌Kathleen M. Murphy (Right to Life) 5.6%
New York 14	Bill Green; Redistricted from the 15th district	Republican	1982	Incumbent lost re-election. Democratic gain.	▌ ✓ Carolyn Maloney (Democratic) 50.4%; ▌Bill Green (Republican) 48.2%; ▌Abraham J. Hirschfeld (Independent) 1.5%
New York 15	Charles Rangel; Redistricted from the 16th district	Democratic	1970	Incumbent re-elected.	▌ ✓ Charles Rangel (Democratic) 94.9%; ▌Jose A. Suero (Conservative) 3.9%; ▌Jessie Fields (New Alliance) 1.2%
New York 16	José E. Serrano; Redistricted from the 18th district	Democratic	1990	Incumbent re-elected.	▌ ✓ José E. Serrano (Democratic) 91.4%; ▌Michael Walters (Republican) 8.6%
New York 17	Eliot Engel; Redistricted from the 19th district	Democratic	1988	Incumbent re-elected.	▌ ✓ Eliot Engel (Democratic) 80.1%; ▌Martin Richman (Republican) 13.5%; ▌Kevin Brawley (Conservative) 2.6%; ▌Martin J. O'Grady (Right to Life) 2.5%; ▌Nana LaLuz (Natural Law) 1.3%
New York 18	Nita Lowey; Redistricted from the 20th district	Democratic	1988	Incumbent re-elected.	▌ ✓ Nita Lowey (Democratic) 55.6%; ▌Joseph J. DioGuardi (Republican) 44.5%
New York 19	Hamilton Fish IV; Redistricted from the 21st district	Republican	1968	Incumbent re-elected.	▌ ✓ Hamilton Fish IV (Republican) 60.1%; ▌Neil P. McCarthy (Democratic) 39.9%
New York 20	Benjamin Gilman; Redistricted from the 22nd district	Republican	1972	Incumbent re-elected.	▌ ✓ Benjamin Gilman (Republican) 66.1%; ▌Jonathan L. Levine (Democratic) 29.4%; ▌Robert F. Garrison (Right to Life) 4.5%
New York 21	Michael McNulty; Redistricted from the 23rd district	Democratic	1988	Incumbent re-elected.	▌ ✓ Michael McNulty (Democratic) 62.7%; ▌Nancy Norman (Republican) 34.4%; ▌William J. Donnelly (Right to Life) 2.9%
New York 22	Gerald Solomon; Redistricted from the 24th district	Republican	1978	Incumbent re-elected.	▌ ✓ Gerald Solomon (Republican) 65.4%; ▌David Roberts (Democratic) 34.6%
New York 23	Sherwood Boehlert; Redistricted from the 25th district	Republican	1982	Incumbent re-elected.	▌ ✓ Sherwood Boehlert (Republican) 63.6%; ▌Paula DiPerna (Democratic) 28.2%; ▌Randall A. Terry (Right to Life) 4.0%; ▌Geoffrey P. Grace (Conservative) 3.7%; ▌Ted F. Janowski (Natural Law) 0.6%
New York 24	David O'Brien Martin; Redistricted from the 26th district	Republican	1980	Incumbent retired. Republican hold.	▌ ✓ John M. McHugh (Republican) 60.8%; ▌Margaret M. Ravenscroft (Democratic) 23.7%; ▌Morrison J. Hosley Jr. (Conservative) 13.3%; ▌Stephen Burke (Liberal) 2.2%
New York 25	James T. Walsh; Redistricted from the 27th district	Republican	1988	Incumbent re-elected.	▌ ✓ James T. Walsh (Republican) 55.7%; ▌Rhea Jezer (Democratic) 44.3%
New York 26	Matt McHugh; Redistricted from the 28th district	Democratic	1974	Incumbent retired. Democratic hold.	▌ ✓ Maurice Hinchey (Democratic) 50.4%; ▌Bob Moppert (Republican) 46.7%; ▌Mary C. Dixon (Right to Life) 2.9%
New York 27	Bill Paxon; Redistricted from the 31st district	Republican	1988	Incumbent re-elected.	▌ ✓ Bill Paxon (Republican) 63.5%; ▌W. Douglas Call (Democratic) 36.5%
New York 28	Frank Horton; Redistricted from the 29th district	Republican	1962	Incumbent retired. Democratic loss.	▌ ✓ Louise Slaughter (Democratic) 55.2%; ▌William P. Polito (Republican) 44.0%; ▌Keith R. T. Perez (Economic Justice) 0.7%
New York 28	Louise Slaughter; Redistricted from the 30th district	Democratic	1986	Incumbent re-elected.	▌ ✓ Louise Slaughter (Democratic) 55.2%; ▌William P. Polito (Republican) 44.0%; ▌Keith R. T. Perez (Economic Justice) 0.7%
New York 29	John LaFalce; Redistricted from the 32nd district	Democratic	1974	Incumbent re-elected.	▌ ✓ John LaFalce (Democratic) 54.5%; ▌William E. Miller Jr. (Republican) 41.6%; ▌Kenneth J. Kowalski (Right to Life) 3.1%; ▌John A. Basar Jr. (Economic Justice) 0.8%
New York 30	Henry J. Nowak; Redistricted from the 33rd district	Democratic	1974	Incumbent retired. Republican gain.	▌ ✓ Jack Quinn (Republican) 51.7%; ▌Dennis T. Gorski (Democratic) 45.8%; ▌Mary F. Refermat (Right to Life) 2.5%
New York 31	Amo Houghton; Redistricted from the 34th district	Republican	1986	Incumbent re-elected.	▌ ✓ Amo Houghton (Republican) 70.6%; ▌Joseph P. Leahey (Democratic) 24.4%; ▌Gretchen S. McManus (Right to Life) 5.1%

== North Carolina ==
District	Incumbent			This race	
District	Member	Party	First elected	Results	Candidates
North Carolina 1	Vacant			Walter B. Jones Sr. (D) died September 15, 1992. Democratic hold.	▌ ✓ Eva Clayton (Democratic) 67.0%; ▌Ted Tyler (Republican) 31.4%; ▌C. Barry Williams (Libertarian) 1.6%
North Carolina 2	Tim Valentine	Democratic	1982	Incumbent re-elected.	▌ ✓ Tim Valentine (Democratic) 53.7%; ▌Don Davis (Republican) 44.4%; ▌Dennis Bryant Lubahn (Libertarian) 1.9%
North Carolina 3	Martin Lancaster	Democratic	1986	Incumbent re-elected.	▌ ✓ Martin Lancaster (Democratic) 54.4%; ▌Tommy Pollard (Republican) 43.2%; ▌Mark Jackson (Libertarian) 2.4%
North Carolina 4	David Price	Democratic	1986	Incumbent re-elected.	▌ ✓ David Price (Democratic) 64.6%; ▌Vicky Rothrock Goudie (Republican) 33.7%; ▌Eugene Paczelt (Libertarian) 1.7%
North Carolina 5	Stephen L. Neal	Democratic	1974	Incumbent re-elected.	▌ ✓ Stephen L. Neal (Democratic) 52.7%; ▌Richard Burr (Republican) 45.6%; ▌Gary Albrecht (Libertarian) 1.7%
North Carolina 6	Howard Coble	Republican	1984	Incumbent re-elected.	▌ ✓ Howard Coble (Republican) 70.8%; ▌Robin Hood (Democratic) 29.2%
North Carolina 7	Charlie Rose	Democratic	1972	Incumbent re-elected.	▌ ✓ Charlie Rose (Democratic) 56.7%; ▌Robert C. Anderson (Republican) 40.8%; ▌Marc Kelley (Libertarian) 2.5%
North Carolina 8	Bill Hefner	Democratic	1974	Incumbent re-elected.	▌ ✓ Bill Hefner (Democratic) 57.9%; ▌Coy Privette (Republican) 36.8%; ▌J. Wendell Drye (Libertarian) 5.3%
North Carolina 9	Alex McMillan	Republican	1984	Incumbent re-elected.	▌ ✓ Alex McMillan (Republican) 67.3%; ▌Rory Blake (Democratic) 32.7%
North Carolina 10	Cass Ballenger	Republican	1986	Incumbent re-elected.	▌ ✓ Cass Ballenger (Republican) 63.4%; ▌Ben Neill (Democratic) 33.7%; ▌Jeffrey Clayton Brown (Libertarian) 2.9%
North Carolina 11	Charles H. Taylor	Republican	1990	Incumbent re-elected.	▌ ✓ Charles H. Taylor (Republican) 54.7%; ▌John Shorter Stevens (Democratic) 45.3%
North Carolina 12	New seat			New seat. Democratic gain.	▌ ✓ Mel Watt (Democratic) 70.4%; ▌Barbara Gore Washington (Republican) 27.3%; ▌Curtis Wade Krumel (Libertarian) 2.3%

== North Dakota ==
District	Incumbent			This race	
District	Member	Party	First elected	Results	Candidates
North Dakota at-large	Byron Dorgan	Democratic-NPL	1980	Incumbent retired to run for U.S. senator. Democratic-NPL hold.	▌ ✓ Earl Pomeroy (Democratic-NPL) 59.0%; ▌John T. Korsmo (Republican) 41.0%

== Ohio ==
District	Incumbent			This race	
District	Member	Party	First elected	Results	Candidates
Ohio 1	Charlie Luken	Democratic	1990	Incumbent retired. Democratic hold.	▌ ✓ David S. Mann (Democratic) 51.3%; ▌Stephen Grote (Republican) 43.3%; ▌Jim Berns (Independent) 5.4%
Ohio 2	Bill Gradison	Republican	1974	Incumbent re-elected.	▌ ✓ Bill Gradison (Republican) 70.1%; ▌Thomas R. Chandler (Democratic) 29.9%
Ohio 3	Tony P. Hall	Democratic	1978	Incumbent re-elected.	▌ ✓ Tony P. Hall (Democratic) 59.7%; ▌Stephen W. Davis (Republican) 40.3%
Ohio 4	Mike Oxley	Republican	1981	Incumbent re-elected.	▌ ✓ Mike Oxley (Republican) 61.4%; ▌Raymond M. Ball (Democratic) 38.6%
Ohio 5	Paul Gillmor	Republican	1988	Incumbent re-elected.	▌ ✓ Paul Gillmor (Republican); Uncontested
Ohio 6	Bob McEwen	Republican	1980	Incumbent lost re-election. Democratic gain.	▌ ✓ Ted Strickland (Democratic) 50.7%; ▌Bob McEwen (Republican) 49.3%
Ohio 7	Dave Hobson	Republican	1990	Incumbent re-elected.	▌ ✓ Dave Hobson (Republican) 71.3%; ▌Clifford S. Heskett (Democratic) 28.7%
Ohio 7	Clarence E. Miller; Redistricted from the 10th district	Republican	1966	Incumbent ran in the 6th district and lost renomination there. Republican loss	▌ ✓ Dave Hobson (Republican) 71.3%; ▌Clifford S. Heskett (Democratic) 28.7%
Ohio 8	John Boehner	Republican	1990	Incumbent re-elected.	▌ ✓ John Boehner (Republican) 74.0%; ▌Fred Sennet (Democratic) 26.0%
Ohio 9	Marcy Kaptur	Democratic	1982	Incumbent re-elected.	▌ ✓ Marcy Kaptur (Democratic) 73.6%; ▌Ken D. Brown (Republican) 21.8%; ▌Ed Howard (Independent) 4.6%
Ohio 10	Mary Rose Oakar; Redistricted from the 20th district	Democratic	1976	Incumbent lost re-election. Republican gain.	▌ ✓ Martin Hoke (Republican) 56.8%; ▌Mary Rose Oakar (Democratic) 43.2%
Ohio 11	Louis Stokes; Redistricted from the 21st district	Democratic	1968	Incumbent re-elected.	▌ ✓ Louis Stokes (Democratic) 70.9%; ▌Beryl E. Rothschild (Republican) 20.1%; ▌Edmund Gudenas (Independent) 9.0%
Ohio 12	John Kasich	Republican	1982	Incumbent re-elected.	▌ ✓ John Kasich (Republican) 71.2%; ▌Bob Fitrakis (Democratic) 28.8%
Ohio 13	Don Pease	Democratic	1976	Incumbent retired. Democratic hold.	▌ ✓ Sherrod Brown (Democratic) 55.2%; ▌Margaret R. Mueller (Republican) 36.5%; ▌Mark Miller (Independent) 8.3%
Ohio 14	Tom Sawyer	Democratic	1986	Incumbent re-elected.	▌ ✓ Tom Sawyer (Democratic) 67.8%; ▌Robert Morgan (Republican) 32.2%
Ohio 15	Chalmers Wylie	Republican	1966	Incumbent retired. Republican hold.	▌ ✓ Deborah Pryce (Republican) 44.1%; ▌Richard Cordray (Democratic) 37.9%; ▌Linda Reidelbach (Independent) 18.0%
Ohio 16	Ralph Regula	Republican	1972	Incumbent re-elected.	▌ ✓ Ralph Regula (Republican) 63.7%; ▌Warner D. Mendenhall (Democratic) 36.3%
Ohio 17	James Traficant	Democratic	1984	Incumbent re-elected.	▌ ✓ James Traficant (Democratic) 84.2%; ▌Salvatore Pansino (Republican) 15.8%
Ohio 18	Douglas Applegate	Democratic	1976	Incumbent re-elected.	▌ ✓ Douglas Applegate (Democratic) 68.3%; ▌Bill Ress (Republican) 31.7%
Ohio 19	Ed Feighan	Democratic	1982	Incumbent retired. Democratic hold.	▌ ✓ Eric Fingerhut (Democratic) 52.6%; ▌Robert A. Gardner (Republican) 47.4%
Ohio 19	Dennis E. Eckart; Redistricted from the 11th district	Democratic	1980	Incumbent retired. Democratic loss.	▌ ✓ Eric Fingerhut (Democratic) 52.6%; ▌Robert A. Gardner (Republican) 47.4%

== Oklahoma ==
District	Incumbent			This race	
District	Member	Party	First elected	Results	Candidates
Oklahoma 1	Jim Inhofe	Republican	1986	Incumbent re-elected.	▌ ✓ Jim Inhofe (Republican) 52.8%; ▌John Selph (Democratic) 47.2%
Oklahoma 2	Mike Synar	Democratic	1978	Incumbent re-elected.	▌ ✓ Mike Synar (Democratic) 55.5%; ▌Jerry Hill (Republican) 41.1%; ▌William Vardeman (Independent) 3.4%
Oklahoma 3	Bill Brewster	Democratic	1990	Incumbent re-elected.	▌ ✓ Bill Brewster (Democratic) 75.1%; ▌Robert W. Stokes (Republican) 24.9%
Oklahoma 4	Dave McCurdy	Democratic	1980	Incumbent re-elected.	▌ ✓ Dave McCurdy (Democratic) 70.7%; ▌Howard Bell (Republican) 29.3%
Oklahoma 5	Mickey Edwards	Republican	1976	Incumbent lost renomination. Republican hold.	▌ ✓ Ernest Istook (Republican) 53.4%; ▌Laurie Williams (Democratic) 46.6%
Oklahoma 6	Glenn English	Democratic	1974	Incumbent re-elected.	▌ ✓ Glenn English (Democratic) 67.8%; ▌Bob Anthony (Republican) 32.2%

== Oregon ==
District	Incumbent			This race	
District	Member	Party	First elected	Results	Candidates
Oregon 1	Les AuCoin	Democratic	1974	Retired to run for U.S. senator. Democratic hold.	▌ ✓ Elizabeth Furse (Democratic) 52.5%; ▌Tony Meeker (Republican) 48.4%
Oregon 2	Bob Smith	Republican	1982	Incumbent re-elected.	▌ ✓ Bob Smith (Republican) 67.1%; ▌Denzel Ferguson (Democratic) 32.8%
Oregon 3	Ron Wyden	Democratic	1980	Incumbent re-elected.	▌ ✓ Ron Wyden (Democratic) 77.1%; ▌Al Ritter (Republican) 18.6%; ▌Blair Bobier (Libertarian) 4.2%
Oregon 4	Peter DeFazio	Democratic	1986	Incumbent re-elected.	▌ ✓ Peter DeFazio (Democratic) 71.4%; ▌Richard L. Schulz (Republican) 14.0%
Oregon 5	Mike Kopetski	Democratic	1990	Incumbent re-elected.	▌ ✓ Mike Kopetski (Democratic) 63.9%; ▌Jim Seagraves (Republican) 35.9%

== Pennsylvania ==
District	Incumbent			This race	
District	Member	Party	First elected	Results	Candidates
Pennsylvania 1	Thomas M. Foglietta	Democratic	1980	Incumbent re-elected.	▌ ✓ Thomas M. Foglietta (Democratic) 80.9%; ▌Craig Snyder (Republican) 19.1%
Pennsylvania 2	Lucien Blackwell	Democratic	1991	Incumbent re-elected.	▌ ✓ Lucien Blackwell (Democratic) 76.8%; ▌Larry Hollin (Republican) 22.4%; ▌Mark Wyatt (Socialist Workers) 0.8%
Pennsylvania 3	Robert Borski	Democratic	1982	Incumbent re-elected.	▌ ✓ Robert Borski (Democratic) 58.9%; ▌Charles F. Dougherty (Republican) 39.1%; ▌John J. Hughes (Independent) 2.0%
Pennsylvania 4	Joe Kolter	Democratic	1982	Incumbent lost renomination. Democratic hold.	▌ ✓ Ron Klink (Democratic) 78.5%; ▌Gordon R. Johnston (Republican) 20.4%; ▌Drew Ley (Independent) 1.2%
Pennsylvania 5	William Clinger; Redistricted from the 23rd district	Republican	1978	Incumbent re-elected.	▌ ✓ William Clinger (Republican); Uncontested
Pennsylvania 6	Gus Yatron	Democratic	1968	Incumbent retired. Democratic hold.	▌ ✓ Tim Holden (Democratic) 52.1%; ▌John E. Jones III (Republican) 47.9%
Pennsylvania 7	Curt Weldon	Republican	1986	Incumbent re-elected.	▌ ✓ Curt Weldon (Republican) 66.0%; ▌Frank Daly (Democratic) 33.5%; ▌William Alan Hickman (Natural Law) 0.6%
Pennsylvania 7	Dick Schulze; Redistricted from the 5th district	Republican	1974	Incumbent retired. Republican loss.	▌ ✓ Curt Weldon (Republican) 66.0%; ▌Frank Daly (Democratic) 33.5%; ▌William Alan Hickman (Natural Law) 0.6%
Pennsylvania 8	Peter H. Kostmayer	Democratic	1976; 1980 (defeated); 1982	Incumbent lost re-election. Republican gain.	▌ ✓ Jim Greenwood (Republican) 51.9%; ▌Peter H. Kostmayer (Democratic) 45.7%; ▌William H. Magerman (Independent) 2.3%
Pennsylvania 9	Bud Shuster	Republican	1972	Incumbent re-elected.	▌ ✓ Bud Shuster (Republican); Uncontested
Pennsylvania 10	Joseph M. McDade	Republican	1962	Incumbent re-elected.	▌ ✓ Joseph M. McDade (Republican) 90.4%; ▌Albert A. Smith (Libertarian) 9.6%
Pennsylvania 11	Paul Kanjorski	Democratic	1984	Incumbent re-elected.	▌ ✓ Paul Kanjorski (Democratic) 67.1%; ▌Michael A. Fescina (Republican) 32.9%
Pennsylvania 12	John Murtha	Democratic	1974	Incumbent re-elected.	▌ ✓ John Murtha (Democratic); Uncontested
Pennsylvania 13	Lawrence Coughlin	Republican	1968	Incumbent retired. Democratic gain.	▌ ✓ Marjorie Margolies-Mezvinsky (Democratic) 50.3%; ▌Jon D. Fox (Republican) 49.7%
Pennsylvania 14	William J. Coyne	Democratic	1980	Incumbent re-elected.	▌ ✓ William J. Coyne (Democratic) 72.3%; ▌Byron W. King (Republican) 26.8%; Others: ▌Joanne S. Kuniansky (Socialist Workers) 0.6%; ▌Paul Scherrer (Workers League) 0.3%
Pennsylvania 15	Donald L. Ritter	Republican	1978	Incumbent lost re-election. Democratic gain.	▌ ✓ Paul McHale (Democratic) 52.2%; ▌Donald L. Ritter (Republican) 46.7%; ▌Eugene A. Nau (Natural Law) 1.1%
Pennsylvania 16	Bob Walker	Republican	1976	Incumbent re-elected.	▌ ✓ Bob Walker (Republican) 64.8%; ▌Robert Peters (Democratic) 35.2%
Pennsylvania 17	George Gekas	Republican	1982	Incumbent re-elected.	▌ ✓ George Gekas (Republican) 69.5%; ▌Bill Sturges (Democratic) 30.5%
Pennsylvania 18	Rick Santorum	Republican	1990	Incumbent re-elected.	▌ ✓ Rick Santorum (Republican) 60.1%; ▌Frank Pecora (Democratic) 38.0%; ▌Denise W. Edwards (New Independent) 1.9%
Pennsylvania 19	Bill Goodling	Republican	1974	Incumbent re-elected.	▌ ✓ Bill Goodling (Republican) 45.3%; ▌Paul V. Kilker (Democratic) 34.4%; ▌Thomas M. Humbert (Independent) 20.3%
Pennsylvania 20	Joseph M. Gaydos	Democratic	1968	Incumbent retired. Democratic loss.	▌ ✓ Austin Murphy (Democratic) 50.7%; ▌Bill Townsend (Republican) 49.3%
Pennsylvania 20	Austin Murphy; Redistricted from the 22nd district	Democratic	1976	Incumbent re-elected.	▌ ✓ Austin Murphy (Democratic) 50.7%; ▌Bill Townsend (Republican) 49.3%
Pennsylvania 21	Tom Ridge	Republican	1982	Incumbent re-elected.	▌ ✓ Tom Ridge (Republican) 68.0%; ▌John C. Harkins (Democratic) 32.0%

== Rhode Island ==
District	Incumbent			This race	
District	Member	Party	First elected	Results	Candidates
Rhode Island 1	Ronald Machtley	Republican	1988	Incumbent re-elected.	▌ ✓ Ronald Machtley (Republican) 70.0%; ▌David Carlin (Democratic) 24.8%; ▌Frederick Dick (Independent) 3.1%; ▌Norman Jacques (Independent) 2.1%
Rhode Island 2	Jack Reed	Democratic	1990	Incumbent re-elected.	▌ ✓ Jack Reed (Democratic) 70.7%; ▌James Bell (Republican) 24.4%; ▌Thomas Ricci (Independent) 3.3%; ▌John Turnbull (Independent) 1.6%

== South Carolina ==
District	Incumbent			This race	
District	Member	Party	First elected	Results	Candidates
South Carolina 1	Arthur Ravenel Jr.	Republican	1986	Incumbent re-elected.	▌ ✓ Arthur Ravenel Jr. (Republican) 66.1%; ▌Bill Oberst Jr. (Democratic) 32.5%; ▌John R. Peeples (American) 1.4%
South Carolina 2	Floyd Spence	Republican	1970	Incumbent re-elected.	▌ ✓ Floyd Spence (Republican) 87.7%; ▌Geb Sommer (Libertarian) 12.3%
South Carolina 3	Butler Derrick	Democratic	1974	Incumbent re-elected.	▌ ✓ Butler Derrick (Democratic) 61.2%; ▌Jim Bland (Republican) 38.8%
South Carolina 4	Liz J. Patterson	Democratic	1986	Incumbent lost re-election. Republican gain.	▌ ✓ Bob Inglis (Republican) 50.4%; ▌Liz J. Patterson (Democratic) 47.5%; ▌Jo Jorgensen (Libertarian) 2.1%
South Carolina 5	John Spratt	Democratic	1982	Incumbent re-elected.	▌ ✓ John Spratt (Democratic) 61.3%; ▌Bill Horne (Republican) 38.7%
South Carolina 6	Robin Tallon	Democratic	1982	Incumbent retired. Democratic hold.	▌ ✓ Jim Clyburn (Democratic) 65.3%; ▌John Chase (Republican) 34.7%

== South Dakota ==
District	Incumbent			This race	
District	Member	Party	First elected	Results	Candidates
South Dakota at-large	Tim Johnson	Democratic	1986	Incumbent re-elected.	▌ ✓ Tim Johnson (Democratic) 69.1%; ▌John Timmer (Republican) 26.9%; ▌Ronald Wieczorek (Independent) 2.0%; ▌Robert Newland (Libertarian) 1.2%; ▌Ann Balakier (Independent) 0.8%

== Tennessee ==
District	Incumbent			This race	
District	Member	Party	First elected	Results	Candidates
Tennessee 1	Jimmy Quillen	Republican	1962	Incumbent re-elected.	▌ ✓ Jimmy Quillen (Republican) 67.5%; ▌Jack Christian (Democratic) 28.1%; ▌Don Fox (Independent) 2.4%; ▌Fred A. Hartley (Independent) 2.0%
Tennessee 2	Jimmy Duncan	Republican	1988	Incumbent re-elected.	▌ ✓ Jimmy Duncan (Republican) 72.2%; ▌Troy Goodale (Democratic) 25.7%; ▌Randon J. Krieg (Independent) 2.1%
Tennessee 3	Marilyn Lloyd	Democratic	1974	Incumbent re-elected.	▌ ✓ Marilyn Lloyd (Democratic) 48.8%; ▌Zach Wamp (Republican) 47.5%; ▌Carol Hagan (Independent) 2.1%; Others: ▌Pete Melcher (Independent) 0.9%; ▌Marjorie M. Martin (Independent) 0.7%
Tennessee 4	Jim Cooper	Democratic	1982	Incumbent re-elected.	▌ ✓ Jim Cooper (Democratic) 64.1%; ▌Dale Johnson (Republican) 32.6%; ▌Ginnia C. Fox (Independent) 2.6%; ▌Kieven Parks (Independent) 0.8%
Tennessee 5	Bob Clement	Democratic	1988	Incumbent re-elected.	▌ ✓ Bob Clement (Democratic) 66.8%; ▌Tom Stone (Republican) 26.3%; ▌Steven L. Edmondson (Independent) 3.6%; ▌Richard H. Wyatt (Independent) 1.9%; Others: ▌John D. Haury (Independent) 0.9%; ▌Ben Tomeo (Independent) 0.5%
Tennessee 6	Bart Gordon	Democratic	1984	Incumbent re-elected.	▌ ✓ Bart Gordon (Democratic) 56.6%; ▌Marsha Blackburn (Republican) 40.6%; ▌H. Scott Benson (Independent) 2.8%
Tennessee 7	Don Sundquist	Republican	1982	Incumbent re-elected.	▌ ✓ Don Sundquist (Republican) 61.7%; ▌David R. Davis (Democratic) 35.5%; ▌Rickey Boyette (Independent) 1.1%; Others: ▌Jim Osburn (Independent) 0.9%; ▌Francis Frederick Tapp (Independent) 0.8%
Tennessee 8	John Tanner	Democratic	1988	Incumbent re-elected.	▌ ✓ John Tanner (Democratic) 83.7%; ▌Lawrence J. Barnes (Independent) 5.9%; ▌David L. Ward (Independent) 4.2%; ▌John E. Vinson (Independent) 3.3%; ▌Millard J. McKissack (Independent) 2.8%
Tennessee 9	Harold Ford Sr.	Democratic	1982	Incumbent re-elected.	▌ ✓ Harold Ford Sr. (Democratic) 57.9%; ▌Charles L. Black (Republican) 28.5%; ▌Richard Liptock (Independent) 6.6%; ▌James Vandergriff (Independent) 5.8%; ▌William Rolen (Independent) 1.2%

== Texas ==
District	Incumbent			This race	
District	Member	Party	First elected	Results	Candidates
Texas 1	Jim Chapman	Democratic	1985	Incumbent re-elected.	▌ ✓ Jim Chapman (Democratic); Uncontested
Texas 2	Charles Wilson	Democratic	1972	Incumbent re-elected.	▌ ✓ Charles Wilson (Democratic) 56.3%; ▌Donna Peterson (Republican) 43.7%
Texas 3	Sam Johnson	Republican	1991	Incumbent re-elected.	▌ ✓ Sam Johnson (Republican) 86.1%; ▌Noel Kopala (Libertarian) 13.9%
Texas 4	Ralph Hall	Democratic	1980	Incumbent re-elected.	▌ ✓ Ralph Hall (Democratic) 58.1%; ▌David L. Bridges (Republican) 38.1%; ▌Steven Rothacker (Libertarian) 3.8%
Texas 5	John Bryant	Democratic	1982	Incumbent re-elected.	▌ ✓ John Bryant (Democratic) 58.9%; ▌Richard Stokley (Republican) 37.3%; ▌William H. Walker (Libertarian) 3.8%
Texas 6	Joe Barton	Republican	1984	Incumbent re-elected.	▌ ✓ Joe Barton (Republican) 71.9%; ▌John Dietrich (Democratic) 28.1%
Texas 7	Bill Archer	Republican	1970	Incumbent re-elected.	▌ ✓ Bill Archer (Republican); Uncontested
Texas 8	Jack Fields	Republican	1980	Incumbent re-elected.	▌ ✓ Jack Fields (Republican) 77.0%; ▌Chas Robinson (Democratic) 23.0%
Texas 9	Jack Brooks	Democratic	1966	Incumbent re-elected.	▌ ✓ Jack Brooks (Democratic) 53.6%; ▌Steve Stockman (Republican) 43.5%; ▌Billy Joe Crawford (Libertarian) 2.9%
Texas 10	J. J. Pickle	Democratic	1963	Incumbent re-elected.	▌ ✓ J. J. Pickle (Democratic) 67.7%; ▌Herbert Spiro (Republican) 26.2%; ▌Terry Blum (Libertarian) 2.4%; ▌Jeff Davis (Independent) 2.3%
Texas 11	Chet Edwards	Democratic	1990	Incumbent re-elected.	▌ ✓ Chet Edwards (Democratic) 67.4%; ▌James W. Broyles (Republican) 32.6%
Texas 12	Pete Geren	Democratic	1989	Incumbent re-elected.	▌ ✓ Pete Geren (Democratic) 62.8%; ▌David Hobbs (Republican) 37.2%
Texas 13	Bill Sarpalius	Democratic	1988	Incumbent re-elected.	▌ ✓ Bill Sarpalius (Democratic) 60.3%; ▌Beau Boulter (Republican) 39.7%
Texas 14	Greg Laughlin	Democratic	1988	Incumbent re-elected.	▌ ✓ Greg Laughlin (Democratic) 68.1%; ▌Humberto J. Garza (Republican) 27.3%; ▌Vic Vreeland (Independent) 4.6%
Texas 15	Kika de la Garza	Democratic	1964	Incumbent re-elected.	▌ ✓ Kika de la Garza (Democratic) 60.4%; ▌Tom Haughey (Republican) 39.6%
Texas 16	Ron Coleman	Democratic	1982	Incumbent re-elected.	▌ ✓ Ron Coleman (Democratic) 51.9%; ▌Chip Taberski (Republican) 48.1%
Texas 17	Charles Stenholm	Democratic	1978	Incumbent re-elected.	▌ ✓ Charles Stenholm (Democratic) 66.1%; ▌Jeannie Sadowski (Republican) 33.9%
Texas 18	Craig Washington	Democratic	1989	Incumbent re-elected.	▌ ✓ Craig Washington (Democratic) 64.7%; ▌Edward Blum (Republican) 32.6%; ▌Gregg Lassen (Libertarian) 2.7%
Texas 19	Larry Combest	Republican	1984	Incumbent re-elected.	▌ ✓ Larry Combest (Republican) 77.4%; ▌Terry Lee Moser (Democratic) 22.6%
Texas 20	Henry B. González	Democratic	1961	Incumbent re-elected.	▌ ✓ Henry B. González (Democratic); Uncontested
Texas 21	Lamar Smith	Republican	1986	Incumbent re-elected.	▌ ✓ Lamar Smith (Republican) 72.2%; ▌James M. Gaddy (Democratic) 23.7%; ▌William E. Grisham (Libertarian) 4.1%
Texas 22	Tom DeLay	Republican	1984	Incumbent re-elected.	▌ ✓ Tom DeLay (Republican) 68.9%; ▌Richard Konrad (Democratic) 31.1%
Texas 23	Albert Bustamante	Democratic	1984	Incumbent lost re-election. Republican gain.	▌ ✓ Henry Bonilla (Republican) 59.1%; ▌Albert Bustamante (Democratic) 38.4%; ▌David Alter (Libertarian) 2.5%
Texas 24	Martin Frost	Democratic	1978	Incumbent re-elected.	▌ ✓ Martin Frost (Democratic) 59.8%; ▌Steve Masterson (Republican) 40.2%
Texas 25	Michael A. Andrews	Democratic	1982	Incumbent re-elected.	▌ ✓ Michael A. Andrews (Democratic) 56.0%; ▌Dolly Madison McKenna (Republican) 41.4%; ▌Richard Mauk (Libertarian) 2.6%
Texas 26	Dick Armey	Republican	1984	Incumbent re-elected.	▌ ✓ Dick Armey (Republican) 73.1%; ▌John Wayne Caton (Democratic) 26.9%
Texas 27	Solomon Ortiz	Democratic	1982	Incumbent re-elected.	▌ ✓ Solomon Ortiz (Democratic) 55.5%; ▌Jay Kimbrough (Republican) 42.6%; ▌Charles Henry Schoonover (Libertarian) 1.9%
Texas 28	None (District created)			New seat. Democratic gain.	▌ ✓ Frank Tejeda (Democratic) 87.1%; ▌David C. Slatter (Libertarian) 12.9%
Texas 29	None (District created)			New seat. Democratic gain.	▌ ✓ Gene Green (Democratic) 64.9%; ▌Clark Kent Ervin (Republican) 35.1%
Texas 30	None (District created)			New seat. Democratic gain.	▌ ✓ Eddie Bernice Johnson (Democratic) 71.5%; ▌Lucy Cain (Republican) 25.1%; ▌Ken Ashby (Libertarian) 3.4%

== Utah ==
District	Incumbent			This race	
District	Member	Party	First elected	Results	Candidates
Utah 1	Jim Hansen	Republican	1980	Incumbent re-elected.	▌ ✓ Jim Hansen (Republican) 65.3%; ▌Ron Holt (Democratic) 28.0%; ▌William Lawrence (Independent) 6.7%
Utah 2	Wayne Owens	Democratic	1972; 1974 (retired); 1986	Incumbent retired to run for U.S. senator. Democratic hold.	▌ ✓ Karen Shepherd (Democratic) 50.5%; ▌Enid Greene (Republican) 46.8%; ▌Peter Crane (Independent) 2.5%; ▌Eileen Koschak (Socialist Workers) 0.3%
Utah 3	Bill Orton	Democratic	1990	Incumbent re-elected.	▌ ✓ Bill Orton (Democratic) 58.9%; ▌Richard Harrington (Republican) 36.7%; ▌Wayne Hill (Independent) 2.5%; Others: ▌Charles M. Wilson (Independent) 0.9%; ▌Doug Jones (Libertarian) 0.8%; ▌Nels J'Anthony (Socialist Workers) 0.2%

== Vermont ==
District	Incumbent			This race	
District	Member	Party	First elected	Results	Candidates
Vermont at-large	Bernie Sanders	Independent	1990	Incumbent re-elected.	▌ ✓ Bernie Sanders (Independent) 57.8%; ▌Tim Philbin (Republican) 30.9%; ▌Lewis Young (Democratic) 7.9%; ▌Peter Diamondstone (Liberty Union) 1.3%; ▌John Dewey (Natural Law) 1.3%; ▌Douglas Miller (LaRouche) 0.7%

== Virginia ==
One seat gained in reapportionment.

District	Incumbent			This race	
District	Member	Party	First elected	Results	Candidates
Virginia 1	Herb Bateman	Republican	1982	Incumbent re-elected.	▌ ✓ Herb Bateman (Republican) 57.6%; ▌Andrew Fox (Democratic) 38.7%; ▌Donald Macleay (Independent) 3.7%
Virginia 2	Owen B. Pickett	Democratic	1986	Incumbent re-elected.	▌ ✓ Owen B. Pickett (Democratic) 56.0%; ▌Jim Chapman (Republican) 43.9%
Virginia 3	None (District created)			New seat. Democratic gain.	▌ ✓ Bobby Scott (Democratic) 78.6%; ▌Daniel Jenkins (Republican) 21.2%
Virginia 4	Norman Sisisky	Democratic	1982	Incumbent re-elected.	▌ ✓ Norman Sisisky (Democratic) 68.4%; ▌Anthony Zevgolis (Republican) 31.6%
Virginia 5	Lewis F. Payne Jr.	Democratic	1988	Incumbent re-elected.	▌ ✓ Lewis F. Payne Jr. (Democratic) 68.9%; ▌Bill Hurlburt (Republican) 31.1%
Virginia 6	Jim Olin	Democratic	1982	Incumbent retired. Republican gain.	▌ ✓ Bob Goodlatte (Republican) 60.0%; ▌Stephen Musselwhite (Democratic) 39.9%
Virginia 7	George Allen	Republican	1991	Retired to run for Governor of Virginia. Republican loss.	▌ ✓ Thomas J. Bliley Jr. (Republican) 82.8%; ▌Jerry Berg (Independent) 16.9%
Virginia 7	Thomas J. Bliley Jr. Redistricted from the 3rd district	Republican	1980	Incumbent re-elected.	▌ ✓ Thomas J. Bliley Jr. (Republican) 82.8%; ▌Jerry Berg (Independent) 16.9%
Virginia 8	Jim Moran	Democratic	1990	Incumbent re-elected.	▌ ✓ Jim Moran (Democratic) 56.1%; ▌Kyle E. McSlarrow (Republican) 41.6%; ▌Alvin West (Independent) 2.3%
Virginia 9	Rick Boucher	Democratic	1982	Incumbent re-elected.	▌ ✓ Rick Boucher (Democratic) 63.1%; ▌L. Garrett Weddle (Republican) 36.9%
Virginia 10	Frank Wolf	Republican	1980	Incumbent re-elected.	▌ ✓ Frank Wolf (Republican) 63.6%; ▌Ray Vickery (Democratic) 33.4%; ▌Alan Ogden (Independent) 3.0%
Virginia 11	None (District created)			New seat. Democratic gain.	▌ ✓ Leslie Byrne (Democratic) 50.0%; ▌Henry Butler (Republican) 45.2%; ▌Art Narro (Independent) 2.9%; ▌Perry J. Mitchell (Independent) 1.8%

== Washington ==
District	Incumbent			This race	
District	Member	Party	First elected	Results	Candidates
Washington 1	John Miller	Republican	1984	Incumbent retired. Democratic gain.	▌ ✓ Maria Cantwell (Democratic) 54.9%; ▌Gary Nelson (Republican) 42.0%; ▌Patrick L. Ruckert (Independent) 1.6%; ▌Anne Fleming (Natural Law) 1.6%
Washington 2	Al Swift	Democratic	1978	Incumbent re-elected.	▌ ✓ Al Swift (Democratic) 52.1%; ▌Jack Metcalf (Republican) 42.0%; ▌Robin Dexter (Independent) 3.4%; ▌Karen Leibrant (Natural Law) 2.6%
Washington 3	Jolene Unsoeld	Democratic	1988	Incumbent re-elected.	▌ ✓ Jolene Unsoeld (Democratic) 56.0%; ▌Pat Fiske (Republican) 44.0%
Washington 4	Sid Morrison	Republican	1980	Retired to run for Governor of Washington. Democratic gain.	▌ ✓ Jay Inslee (Democratic) 50.8%; ▌Doc Hastings (Republican) 49.2%
Washington 5	Tom Foley	Democratic	1964	Incumbent re-elected.	▌ ✓ Tom Foley (Democratic) 55.2%; ▌John Sonneland (Republican) 44.8%
Washington 6	Norm Dicks	Democratic	1976	Incumbent re-elected.	▌ ✓ Norm Dicks (Democratic) 64.2%; ▌Lauri J. Phillips (Republican) 28.0%; ▌Tom Donnelly (Independent) 6.1%; ▌Jim Horrigan (Libertarian) 1.7%
Washington 7	Jim McDermott	Democratic	1988	Incumbent re-elected.	▌ ✓ Jim McDermott (Democratic) 78.4%; ▌Glenn C. Hampson (Republican) 19.1%; ▌Paul Glumaz (Independent) 2.5%
Washington 8	Rod Chandler	Republican	1982	Retired to run for U.S. senator. Republican hold.	▌ ✓ Jennifer Dunn (Republican) 60.4%; ▌George O. Tamblyn (Democratic) 33.9%; ▌Bob Adams (Independent) 5.7%
Washington 9	None (District created)			New seat. Democratic gain.	▌ ✓ Mike Kreidler (Democratic) 52.1%; ▌Pete von Reichbauer (Republican) 43.2%; ▌Brian Wilson (Independent) 3.1%; ▌Timothy J. Brill (Independent) 1.7%

== West Virginia ==
District	Incumbent			This race	
District	Member	Party	First elected	Results	Candidates
West Virginia 1	Alan Mollohan	Democratic	1982	Incumbent re-elected.	▌ ✓ Alan Mollohan (Democratic); Uncontested
West Virginia 1	Harley O. Staggers Jr. Redistricted from the 2nd district	Democratic	1982	Incumbent lost renomination. Democratic loss.	▌ ✓ Alan Mollohan (Democratic); Uncontested
West Virginia 2	Bob Wise; Redistricted from the 3rd district	Democratic	1982	Incumbent re-elected.	▌ ✓ Bob Wise (Democratic) 70.9%; ▌Samuel A. Cravotta (Republican) 29.1%
West Virginia 3	Nick Rahall; Redistricted from the 4th district	Democratic	1976	Incumbent re-elected.	▌ ✓ Nick Rahall (Democratic) 65.6%; ▌Ben Waldman (Republican) 34.4%

== Wisconsin ==
District	Incumbent			This race	
District	Member	Party	First elected	Results	Candidates
Wisconsin 1	Les Aspin	Democratic	1970	Incumbent re-elected.	▌ ✓ Les Aspin (Democratic) 57.6%; ▌Mark Neumann (Republican) 40.7%; ▌John Graf (Independent) 1.7%
Wisconsin 2	Scott Klug	Republican	1990	Incumbent re-elected.	▌ ✓ Scott Klug (Republican) 62.6%; ▌Ada Deer (Democratic) 37.0%; ▌Joseph E. Schumacher (Independent) 0.4%
Wisconsin 3	Steve Gunderson	Republican	1980	Incumbent re-elected.	▌ ✓ Steve Gunderson (Republican) 56.4%; ▌Paul Sacia (Democratic) 41.7%; ▌Jay B. Evenson (Independent) 1.9%
Wisconsin 4	Jerry Kleczka	Democratic	1984	Incumbent re-elected.	▌ ✓ Jerry Kleczka (Democratic) 65.8%; ▌Joseph L. Cook (Republican) 32.2%; ▌Daniel Slak (Independent) 1.1%; ▌John Washburn (Libertarian) 0.9%
Wisconsin 5	Jim Moody	Democratic	1982	Retired to run for U.S. senator. Democratic hold.	▌ ✓ Tom Barrett (Democratic) 69.5%; ▌Donalda Hammersmith (Republican) 30.5%
Wisconsin 6	Tom Petri	Republican	1979 (special)	Incumbent re-elected.	▌ ✓ Tom Petri (Republican) 52.9%; ▌Peg Lautenschlager (Democratic) 47.1%
Wisconsin 7	Dave Obey	Democratic	1969 (special)	Incumbent re-elected.	▌ ✓ Dave Obey (Democratic) 64.4%; ▌Dale R. Vannes (Republican) 35.6%
Wisconsin 8	Toby Roth	Republican	1978	Incumbent re-elected.	▌ ✓ Toby Roth (Republican) 70.1%; ▌Catherine L. Helms (Democratic) 29.9%
Wisconsin 9	Jim Sensenbrenner	Republican	1978	Incumbent re-elected.	▌ ✓ Jim Sensenbrenner (Republican) 69.7%; ▌Ingrid K. Buxton (Democratic) 28.0%; ▌David E. Marlow (Independent) 1.7%; ▌Jeffrey Holt Millikin (Libertarian) 0.6%

== Wyoming ==
District	Incumbent			This race	
District	Member	Party	First elected	Results	Candidates
Wyoming at-large	Craig L. Thomas	Republican	1989	Incumbent re-elected.	▌ ✓ Craig L. Thomas (Republican) 57.8%; ▌Jon Herschler (Democratic) 39.3%; ▌Craig Alan McCune (Libertarian) 2.3%

== Non-voting delegates ==
District	Incumbent			This race	
District	Delegate	Party	First elected	Results	Candidates
American Samoa at-large	Eni Faleomavaega	Democratic	1988	Incumbent re-elected.	▌ ✓ Eni Faleomavaega (Democratic) 64.4%; ▌Tautai Aviata Fano Fa'alevao (Republican) 18.3%; ▌Sili Kerisiano Sataua (Independent) 12.4%; ▌Tuika Tuika (Independent) 4.9%
District of Columbia at-large	Eleanor Holmes Norton	Democratic	1990	Incumbent re-elected.	▌ ✓ Eleanor Holmes Norton (Democratic) 84.8%; ▌Susan Emerson (Republican) 10.2%; ▌Susan Griffin (Statehood) 3.7%; ▌Sam Manuel (Socialist Workers) 0.9%
Guam at-large	Ben Blaz	Republican	1986	Incumbent lost re-election. New delegate elected. Democratic gain.	▌ ✓ Robert A. Underwood (Democratic) 55.3%; ▌Ben Blaz (Republican) 44.7%
Puerto Rico at-large	Antonio Colorado	Popular Democratic/ Democratic	1992 (special)	Incumbent lost re-election. New resident commissioner elected. PNP gain.	▌ ✓ Carlos Romero Barceló (PNP/Democratic) 48.6%; ▌Antonio Colorado (PPD/Democratic) 47.9%; ▌Víctor García San Inocencio (PIP) 3.4%
U.S. Virgin Islands at-large	Ron de Lugo	Democratic	1972; 1978 (retired); 1980	Incumbent re-elected.	▌ ✓ Ron de Lugo (Democratic) 61.2%; ▌Victor O. Frazer (Independent) 38.8%

== See also ==
- 1992 United States elections
  - 1992 United States gubernatorial elections
  - 1992 United States presidential election
  - 1992 United States Senate elections
- 102nd United States Congress
- 103rd United States Congress

== Works cited ==
- Abramson, Paul; Aldrich, John; Rohde, David (1995). Change and Continuity in the 1992 Elections. CQ Press. ISBN 0871878399.
