= 1990 United States House of Representatives elections =

House elections for the 102nd U.S. Congress

- November 6, 1990

All 435 seats in the United States House of Representatives 218 seats needed for a majority
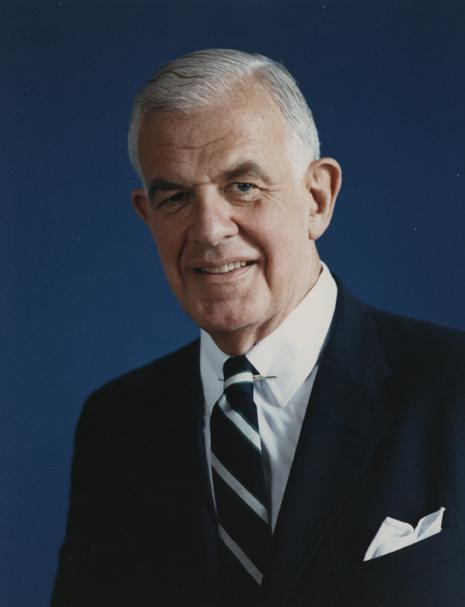

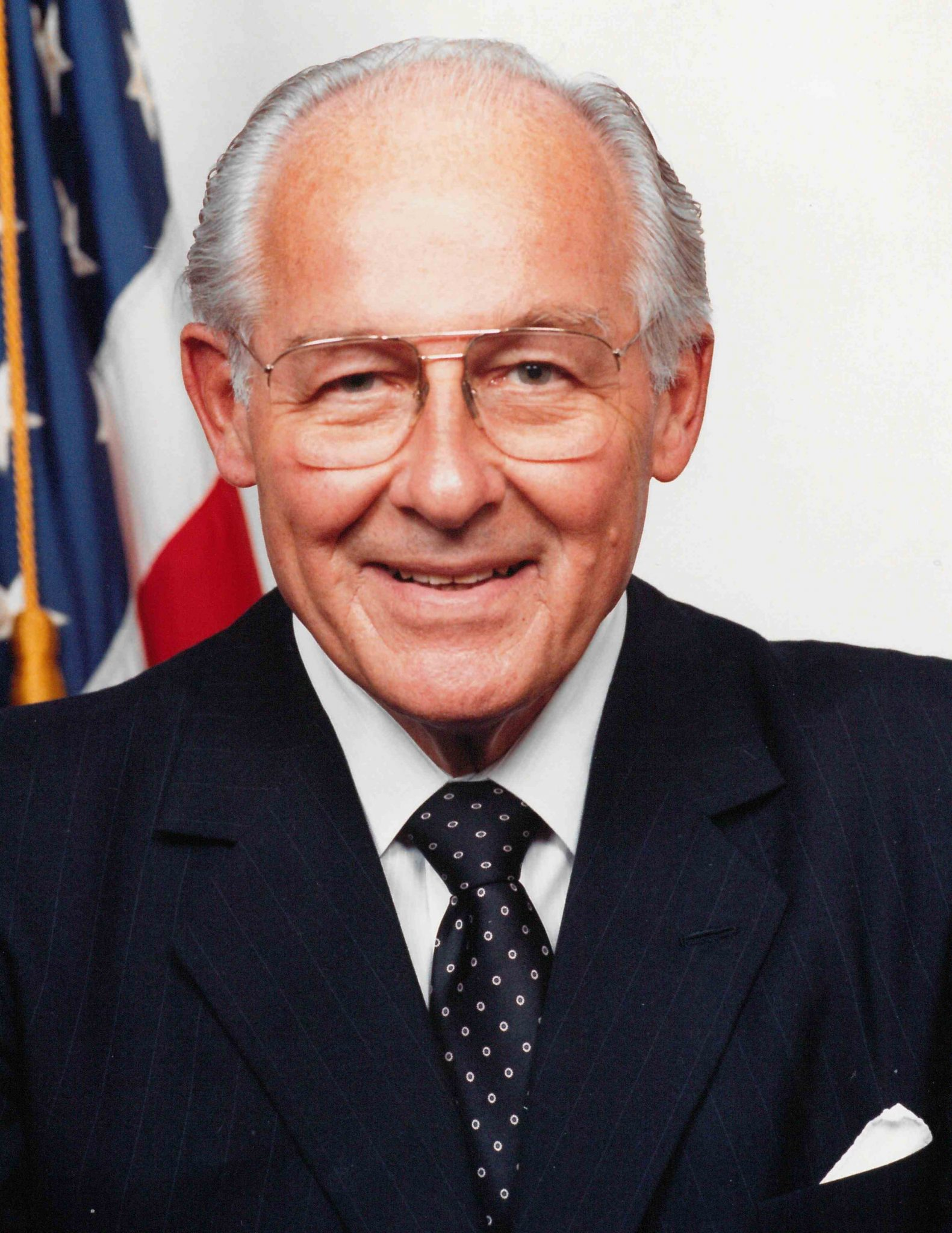
	Majority party	Minority party
Leader	Tom Foley	Bob Michel
Party	Democratic	Republican
Leader since	June 6, 1989	January 3, 1981
Leader's seat	Washington 5th	Illinois 18th
Last election	260 seats	175 seats
Seats won	267	167
Seat change	▲7	▼8
Popular vote	32,463,372	27,596,256
Percentage	52.1%	44.3%
Swing	▼1.2pp	▼1.3pp
	Third party
Party	Independent
Last election	0 seats
Seats won	1
Seat change	▲1
Popular vote	367,603
Percentage	0.6%
- Results: Democratic hold Democratic gain Republican hold Republican gain Independent gain
Speaker before election
Tom Foley
Democratic
Elected Speaker
Tom Foley
Democratic

The 1990 United States House of Representatives elections was an election for the United States House of Representatives on November 6, 1990, to elect members to serve in the 102nd United States Congress. They occurred in the middle of President George H. W. Bush's term. As in most midterm elections, the president's Republican Party lost seats to the Democratic Party, slightly increasing the Democratic majority in the chamber. It was a rare instance, however, in which both major parties lost votes to third parties such as the Libertarian Party as well as independent candidates.

This was the last time any party won at least 261 House seats, or 60 percent of the chamber's seats. It is also the last time a president's party successfully defended an open House seat that the opposition party won in the previous presidential election, according to Kyle Kondik of Sabato's Crystal Ball; in this case, the Republicans defended Iowa's 2nd congressional district.

== Election summaries ==
407 incumbent members sought reelection, but one was defeated in a primary and 15 were defeated in the general election for a total of 391 incumbents winning.

↓
267	1	167
Democratic	(Note: 1 Independent was elected.)	Republican

Popular vote and seats total by states

Party	Seats	Change	Share	Vote percentage	Popular vote
Democratic Party	267	▲7	61.4%	52.1%	32,463,372
Republican Party	167	▼8	38.4%	44.3%	27,596,256
Libertarian Party	0	Steady	0.0%	0.6%	396,131
Independent	1	▲1	0.2%	0.6%	367,603
Peace and Freedom Party	0	Steady	0.0%	0.2%	127,924
Conservative Party	0	Steady	0.0%	0.1%	105,294
Populist Party	0	Steady	0.0%	0.1%	51,894
Right to Life Party	0	Steady	0.0%	0.1%	50,769
Solidarity Party	0	Steady	0.0%	0.1%	34,636
Others	0	Steady	0.0%	1.9%	1,160,974
Totals	435	Steady	100.0%	100.0%	62,354,853

Source: Election Statistics – Office of the Clerk

Popular vote
Democratic	52.06%
Republican	44.26%
Libertarian	0.64%
Others	3.04%

House seats
Democratic	61.38%
Republican	38.39%
Independent	0.23%

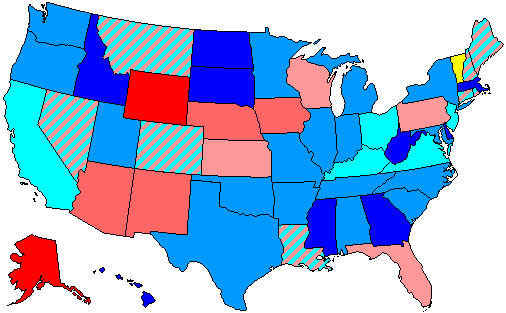
House seats by party holding plurality in state: 80+% Republican / 80+% Democratic; 60+ to 80% Republican / 60+ to 80% Democratic; Up to 60% Republican / Up to 60% Democratic; 100% Independent

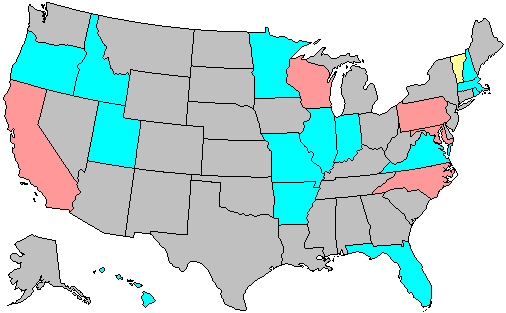
Net gains: 6+ Democratic gain / 6+ Republican gain; 3-5 Democratic gain / 3-5 Republican gain; 1-2 Democratic gain / 1-2 Republican gain; 1 Independent gain no net change

Districts shaded according to winners share of vote.

== Retirements ==
There were a total of 27 Representatives and one delegate not seeking re-election: 11 Democrats and 17 Republicans.

=== Democrats ===
1. Alabama 5: Ronnie Flippo retired to run for Governor of Alabama.
2. California 29: Augustus Hawkins retired.
3. Connecticut 3: Bruce Morrison retired to run for Governor of Connecticut.
4. District of Columbia at-large: Walter Fauntroy retired to run for mayor of Washington D.C.
5. Florida 11: Bill Nelson retired to run for Governor of Florida.
6. Louisiana 2: Lindy Boggs retired.
7. Maine 1: Joseph E. Brennan retired to run for Governor of Maine.
8. Michigan 13: George Crockett Jr. retired.
9. Ohio 1: Tom Luken retired
10. Oklahoma 3: Wes Watkins retired to run for Governor of Oklahoma.
11. Texas 11: Marvin Leath retired.

=== Republicans ===
1. Arkansas 2: Tommy F. Robinson retired to run for Governor of Arkansas.
2. California 14: Norman D. Shumway retired.
3. Colorado 4: Hank Brown retired to run for U.S. Senate.
4. Connecticut 5: John G. Rowland retired to run for Governor of Connecticut.
5. Hawaii 1: Pat Saiki retired to run for U.S. Senate.
6. Idaho 1: Larry Craig retired to run for U.S. Senate.
7. Illinois 16: Lynn Morley Martin retired to run for U.S. Senate.
8. Iowa 2: Tom Tauke retired to run for U.S. Senate.
9. Kansas 5: Bob Whittaker retired.
10. Michigan 10: Bill Schuette retired to run for U.S. Senate.
11. Minnesota 3: Bill Frenzel retired.
12. Nebraska 3: Virginia D. Smith retired.
13. New Hampshire 1: Bob Smith retired to run for U.S. Senate.
14. New Jersey 12: Jim Courter retired
15. Ohio 7: Mike DeWine retired to run for Lieutenant Governor of Ohio.
16. Rhode Island 2: Claudine Schneider retired to run for U.S. Senate.
17. Utah 3: Howard C. Nielson retired

== Resignations ==
Four incumbents resigned in 1990, three Democrats and one Republican, with no special elections to fill the vacant seats before the November election.

=== Democrats ===
1. New York 18: Robert Garcia resigned January 7, 1990 following trial over links to involvement in Wedtech scandal.
2. New Jersey 1: James Florio resigned January 16, 1990, to become Governor of New Jersey.
3. Hawaii 2: Daniel Akaka resigned January 16, 1990, to become a U.S. Senator.

=== Republican ===
1. New York 14: Guy Molinari Incumbent resigned December 31, 1989.

== Incumbents defeated ==
=== In primary elections ===
One Member of Congress lost renomination.

==== Republican ====
1. Ohio 8: Buz Lukens lost renomination to John Boehner, who won the general election.

=== In general elections ===
==== Democrats ====
Six Democrats lost re-election to Republicans

1. California 1: Douglas H. Bosco (first elected in 1982) lost re-election to Frank Riggs
2. California 44: Jim Bates (first elected in 1982) lost re-election to Duke Cunningham
3. Maryland 1: Roy Dyson (first elected in 1980) lost re-election to Wayne Gilchrest
4. North Carolina 11: James M. Clarke (first elected in 1982, and then re-elected in 1986 after losing in 1984) lost re-election to Charles H. Taylor
5. Pennsylvania 18: Doug Walgren (first elected in 1976) lost re-election to Rick Santorum
6. Wisconsin 2: Robert Kastenmeier (first elected in 1958) lost re-election to Scott Klug

==== Republicans ====
Eight Republicans lost re-election to Democrats

1. California 17: Chip Pashayan (first elected in 1978) lost re-election to Cal Dooley
2. Florida 2: Bill Grant (first elected in 1986) lost re-election to Pete Peterson
3. Indiana 3: John P. Hiler (first elected in 1980) lost re-election to Tim Roemer
4. Minnesota 7: Arlan Stangeland (first elected in 1977) lost re-election to Collin Peterson
5. Missouri 2: Jack Buechner (first elected in 1986) lost re-election to Joan Kelly Horn
6. New Hampshire 2: Charles Douglas III (first elected in 1988) lost re-election to Richard Swett
7. Oregon 5: Denny Smith (first elected in 1980) lost re-election to Michael J. Kopetski
8. Virginia 8: Stanford Parris (first elected in 1972, and then re-elected in 1980 after losing in 1974) lost re-election Jim Moran

One Republican lost re-election to an independent

1. Vermont at-large: Peter Plympton Smith (first elected in 1988) lost re-election to Bernie Sanders

== Open seats that changed parties ==
=== Republican seats won by Democrats ===
Six Republican seats were won by Democrats

1. Arkansas 2: Won by Ray Thornton
2. Hawaii 1: Won by Neil Abercrombie
3. Idaho 1: Won by Larry LaRocco
4. Illinois 16: Won by John W. Cox Jr.
5. Rhode Island 2: Won by Jack Reed
6. Utah 3: Won by Bill Orton

=== Democratic seats won by Republicans ===
There were no Democratic seats won by Republicans

== Open seats that parties held ==
=== Democratic seats held by Democrats ===
Democrats held thirteen of their open seats

1. California 14: Won by Anna Eshoo
2. California 29: Won by Maxine Waters
3. District of Columbia at-large: Won by Eleanor Holmes Norton
4. Connecticut 3: Won by Rosa DeLauro
5. Florida 11: Won by Jim Bacchus
6. Hawaii 2: Won by Patsy Mink who also won the district's special election, see below
7. Louisiana 2: Won by William Jefferson
8. Maine 1: Won by Thomas Andrews
9. Michigan 13: Won by Barbara-Rose Collins
10. New Jersey 1: Won by Rob Andrews who also won the district's special election, see below
11. Ohio 1: Won by Charlie Luken
12. Oklahoma 3: Won by Bill Brewster
13. Texas 11: Won by Chet Edwards

=== Republican seats held by Republicans ===
Republicans held twelve of their open seats

1. California 14: Won by John Doolittle
2. Colorado 4: Won by Wayne Allard
3. Connecticut 5: Won by Gary Franks
4. Iowa 2: Won by Jim Nussle
5. Kansas 5: Won by Dick Nichols
6. Michigan 10: Won by Dave Camp
7. Minnesota 3: Won by Jim Ramstad
8. Nebraska 3: Won by Bill Barrett
9. New Hampshire 1: Won by Bill Zeliff
10. New Jersey 12: Won by Dick Zimmer
11. Ohio 7: Won by Dave Hobson
12. Ohio 8: Won by John Boehner

== Closest races ==
Fifty-four races were decided by 10% or lower.

District	Winner	Margin
Missouri 2nd	Democratic (flip)	0.03%
Georgia 6th	Republican	0.62%
Iowa 2nd	Republican	0.99%
North Carolina 11th	Republican (flip)	1.33%
California 1st	Republican (flip)	1.44%
California 44th	Republican (flip)	1.53%
Kentucky 7th	Democratic	1.62%
Indiana 3rd	Democratic (flip)	1.78%
Virginia 1st	Republican	1.99%
Maine 2nd	Republican	2.06%
Ohio 1st	Democratic	2.17%
Nebraska 3rd	Republican	2.27%
Alabama 2nd	Republican	2.58%
New Jersey 3rd	Democratic	2.63%
Pennsylvania 18th	Republican (flip)	2.89%
California 14th	Republican	2.93%
Alaska at-large	Republican	3.82%
Missouri 6th	Republican	3.85%
Florida 11th	Democratic	3.87%
West Virginia 4th	Democratic	3.90%
Washington 1st	Republican	4.09%
Connecticut 3rd	Democratic	4.21%
Missouri 7th	Republican	4.29%
Massachusetts 5th	Democratic	4.36%
New Jersey 6th	Democratic	4.44%
Connecticut 5th	Republican	4.47%
Florida 1st	Democratic	4.47%
Georgia 4th	Democratic	4.87%
Louisiana 2nd	Democratic	5.09% (Note: Under Louisiana's "jungle primary" system, the general election was between two Democrats.)
New Hampshire 2nd	Democratic (flip)	5.37%
California 36th	Democratic	5.42%
California 41st	Republican	5.65%
Idaho 1st	Democratic (flip)	6.01%
Indiana 5th	Democratic	6.28%
Wisconsin 2nd	Republican (flip)	6.45%
Massachusetts 10th	Democratic	6.82%
Texas 11th	Democratic	6.91%
Virginia 8th	Democratic (flip)	7.08%
Wisconsin 8th	Republican	7.09%
Minnesota 7th	Democratic (flip)	7.12%
Washington 3rd	Democratic	7.52%
Colorado 4th	Republican	8.10%
New Jersey 9th	Democratic	8.32%
Utah 1st	Republican	8.35%
Texas 14th	Democratic	8.61%
Illinois 11th	Democratic	8.98%
California 17th	Democratic (flip)	9.09%
Illinois 16th	Democratic (flip)	9.17%
Washington 2nd	Democratic	9.35%
Louisiana 4th	Republican	9.42%
Indiana 8th	Democratic	9.44%
Michigan 9th	Republican	9.51%
North Carolina 8th	Democratic	9.94%

== Special elections ==
Elections are listed by date and district.

District	Incumbent			This race	
District	Representative	Party	First elected	Results	Candidates
New York 18	Robert Garcia	Democratic	1978 (Special)	Incumbent resigned January 7, 1990 following trial over links to involvement in Wedtech scandal. New member March 20, 1990. Democratic hold. Winner was subsequently re-elected in November.	▌ ✓ José E. Serrano (Democratic) 92.4%; ▌Simeon Golar (Republican) 7.2%; ▌Kevin Brawley (Conservative) 0.4%
New York 14	Guy Molinari	Republican	1980	Incumbent resigned December 31, 1989. New member elected March 20, 1990. Republican hold. Winner was subsequently re-elected in November.	▌ ✓ Susan Molinari (Republican) 59.11%; ▌Robert J. Gigante (Democratic) 34.71%; ▌Barbara S. Bollaert (Right to Life) 5.33%
New Jersey 1	James Florio	Democratic	1974	Incumbent resigned January 16, 1990, to become Governor of New Jersey. New member elected November 6, 1990. Democratic hold. Winner also elected the same day to the next term; see below.	▌ ✓ Rob Andrews (Democratic) 55.13%; ▌Daniel J. Mangini (Republican) 44.87%
Hawaii 2	Daniel Akaka	Democratic	1976	Incumbent resigned May 15, 1990 to become U.S. senator. New member elected November 6, 1990. Democratic hold. Winner also elected the same day to the next term; see below.	▌ ✓ Patsy Mink (Democratic) 37.35%; ▌Mufi Hannemann (Democratic) 36.14%; ▌Ron Menor (Democratic) 17.02%; ▌Andy Poepoe (Republican) 6.39%; ▌Stanley Monsef (Republican) 1.63%

== Alabama ==
District	Incumbent			This race	
District	Representative	Party	First elected	Results	Candidates
Alabama 1	Sonny Callahan	Republican	1984	Incumbent re-elected.	▌ ✓ Sonny Callahan (Republican) 99.6%
Alabama 2	William L. Dickinson	Republican	1964	Incumbent re-elected.	▌ ✓ William L. Dickinson (Republican) 51.3%; ▌Faye Baggiano (Democratic) 48.7%
Alabama 3	Glen Browder	Democratic	1989 (special)	Incumbent re-elected.	▌ ✓ Glen Browder (Democratic) 73.7%; ▌Don Sledge (Republican) 26.3%
Alabama 4	Tom Bevill	Democratic	1966	Incumbent re-elected.	▌ ✓ Tom Bevill (Democratic) 99.7%
Alabama 5	Ronnie Flippo	Democratic	1976	Incumbent retired to run for Alabama Governor. Democratic hold.	▌ ✓ Bud Cramer (Democratic) 67.1%; ▌Albert McDonald (Republican) 32.8%
Alabama 6	Ben Erdreich	Democratic	1982	Incumbent re-elected.	▌ ✓ Ben Erdreich (Democratic) 92.8%; ▌David A. Alvarez (Republican) 6.0%; ▌Nathaniel Ivory (Independent) 1.2%
Alabama 7	Claude Harris Jr.	Democratic	1986	Incumbent re-elected.	▌ ✓ Claude Harris Jr. (Democratic) 70.5%; ▌Michael D. Barker (Republican) 29.5%

== Alaska ==
District	Incumbent			This race	
District	Representative	Party	First elected	Results	Candidates
Alaska at-large	Don Young	Republican	1973 (special)	Incumbent re-elected.	▌ ✓ Don Young (Republican) 51.7%; ▌John S. Devens (Democratic) 47.8%

== Arizona ==
District	Incumbent			This race	
District	Representative	Party	First elected	Results	Candidates
Arizona 1	John Jacob Rhodes III	Republican	1986	Incumbent re-elected.	▌ ✓ John Jacob Rhodes III (Republican) 99.5%
Arizona 2	Mo Udall	Democratic	1961 (special)	Incumbent re-elected.	▌ ✓ Mo Udall (Democratic) 65.9%; ▌Joseph D. Sweeney (Republican) 34.1%
Arizona 3	Bob Stump	Republican	1976 (Note: Stump was originally elected as a Democrat. He switched parties in 1982 and was re-elected as such that year.)	Incumbent re-elected.	▌ ✓ Bob Stump (Republican) 56.6%; ▌Roger Hartstone (Democratic) 43.4%
Arizona 4	Jon Kyl	Republican	1986	Incumbent re-elected.	▌ ✓ Jon Kyl (Republican) 61.3%; ▌Mark Ivey Jr. (Democratic) 38.7%
Arizona 5	Jim Kolbe	Republican	1984	Incumbent re-elected.	▌ ✓ Jim Kolbe (Republican) 64.8%; ▌Chuck Phillips (Democratic) 35.2%

== Arkansas ==
District	Incumbent			This race	
District	Representative	Party	First elected	Results	Candidates
Arkansas 1	William Vollie Alexander Jr.	Democratic	1968	Incumbent re-elected.	▌ ✓ William Vollie Alexander Jr. (Democratic) 64.3%; ▌Terry Hayes (Republican) 35.7%
Arkansas 2	Tommy F. Robinson	Republican	1984	Incumbent retired to run for Arkansas Governor. Democratic gain.	▌ ✓ Ray Thornton (Democratic) 60.4%; ▌Jim Keet (Republican) 39.6%
Arkansas 3	John Paul Hammerschmidt	Republican	1966	Incumbent re-elected.	▌ ✓ John Paul Hammerschmidt (Republican) 70.5%; ▌Dan Ivy (Democratic) 29.5%
Arkansas 4	Beryl Anthony Jr.	Democratic	1978	Incumbent re-elected.	▌ ✓ Beryl Anthony Jr. (Democratic) 72.4%; ▌Roy Rood (Republican) 27.6%

== California ==
District	Incumbent			This race	
District	Representative	Party	First elected	Results	Candidates
California 1	Douglas H. Bosco	Democratic	1982	Incumbent lost re-election. Republican gain.	▌ ✓ Frank Riggs (Republican) 43.3%; ▌Douglas H. Bosco (Democratic) 41.9%; ▌Darlene Comingore (Peace and Freedom) 14.8%
California 2	Wally Herger	Republican	1986	Incumbent re-elected.	▌ ✓ Wally Herger (Republican) 63.7%; ▌Bill Rush (Democratic) 31.2%; ▌Ross Crain (Libertarian) 5.1%
California 3	Bob Matsui	Democratic	1978	Incumbent re-elected.	▌ ✓ Bob Matsui (Democratic) 60.3%; ▌Lowell Patrick Landowski (Republican) 34.8%; ▌David M. McCann (Libertarian) 4.9%
California 4	Vic Fazio	Democratic	1978	Incumbent re-elected.	▌ ✓ Vic Fazio (Democratic) 54.7%; ▌Mark Baughman (Republican) 39.3%; ▌Bryce Bigwood (Libertarian) 6%
California 5	Nancy Pelosi	Democratic	1987	Incumbent re-elected.	▌ ✓ Nancy Pelosi (Democratic) 77.2%; ▌Alan Nichols (Republican) 22.8%
California 6	Barbara Boxer	Democratic	1982	Incumbent re-elected.	▌ ✓ Barbara Boxer (Democratic) 68.1%; ▌Bill Boerum (Republican) 31.9%
California 7	George Miller	Democratic	1974	Incumbent re-elected.	▌ ✓ George Miller (Democratic) 60.5%; ▌Roger A. Payton (Republican) 39.5%
California 8	Ron Dellums	Democratic	1970	Incumbent re-elected.	▌ ✓ Ron Dellums (Democratic) 61.3%; ▌Barbara Galewski (Republican) 38.7%
California 9	Pete Stark	Democratic	1972	Incumbent re-elected.	▌ ✓ Pete Stark (Democratic) 58.4%; ▌Victor Romero (Republican) 41.6%
California 10	Don Edwards	Democratic	1972	Incumbent re-elected.	▌ ✓ Don Edwards (Democratic) 62.7%; ▌Mark Patrosso (Republican) 37.3%
California 11	Tom Lantos	Democratic	1980	Incumbent re-elected.	▌ ✓ Tom Lantos (Democratic) 65.9%; ▌Bill Quraishi (Republican) 28.8%; ▌June R. Genis (Libertarian) 5.3%
California 12	Tom Campbell	Republican	1988	Incumbent re-elected.	▌ ✓ Tom Campbell (Republican) 60.8%; ▌Bob Palmer (Democratic) 33.7%; ▌Chuck Olson (Libertarian) 5.5%
California 13	Norman Mineta	Democratic	1974	Incumbent re-elected.	▌ ✓ Norman Mineta (Democratic) 58%; ▌David E. Smith (Republican) 35.7%; ▌John H. Webster (Libertarian) 6.3%
California 14	Norman D. Shumway	Republican	1978	Incumbent retired. Republican hold.	▌ ✓ John Doolittle (Republican) 51.5%; ▌Patricia Malberg (Democratic) 48.5%
California 15	Gary Condit	Democratic	1989	Incumbent re-elected.	▌ ✓ Gary Condit (Democratic) 66.2%; ▌Cliff Burris (Republican) 33.8%
California 16	Leon Panetta	Democratic	1976	Incumbent re-elected.	▌ ✓ Leon Panetta (Democratic) 74.2%; ▌Jerry M. Reiss (Republican) 22%; ▌Brian H. Tucker (Libertarian) 3.8%
California 17	Chip Pashayan	Republican	1978	Incumbent lost re-election. Democratic gain.	▌ ✓ Cal Dooley (Democratic) 54.5%; ▌Chip Pashayan (Republican) 45.5%
California 18	Rick Lehman	Democratic	1982	Incumbent re-elected.	▌ ✓ Rick Lehman (Democratic) Uncontested
California 19	Bob Lagomarsino	Republican	1974	Incumbent re-elected.	▌ ✓ Bob Lagomarsino (Republican) 54.6%; ▌Anita Perez Ferguson (Democratic) 44.4%
California 20	Bill Thomas	Republican	1978	Incumbent re-elected.	▌ ✓ Bill Thomas (Republican) 59.9%; ▌Michael A. Thomas (Democratic) 34.5%; ▌William Howard Dilbeck (Libertarian) 5.6%
California 21	Elton Gallegly	Republican	1986	Incumbent re-elected.	▌ ✓ Elton Gallegly (Republican) 58.4%; ▌Richard D. Freiman (Democratic) 34%; ▌Peggy Christensen (Libertarian) 7.6%
California 22	Carlos Moorhead	Republican	1972	Incumbent re-elected.	▌ ✓ Carlos Moorhead (Republican) 60%; ▌David Bayer (Democratic) 34.1%; ▌William H. Wilson (Libertarian) 3.7%; ▌Jan B. Tucker (Peace and Freedom) 2.2%
California 23	Anthony Beilenson	Democratic	1976	Incumbent re-elected.	▌ ✓ Anthony Beilenson (Democratic) 61.7%; ▌Jim Salomon (Republican) 34.2%; ▌John Honigsfeld (Peace and Freedom) 4.1%
California 24	Henry Waxman	Democratic	1974	Incumbent re-elected.	▌ ✓ Henry Waxman (Democratic) 68.9%; ▌John N. Cowles (Republican) 25.6%; ▌Maggie Phair (Peace and Freedom) 5.5%
California 25	Edward R. Roybal	Democratic	1962	Incumbent re-elected.	▌ ✓ Edward R. Roybal (Democratic) 70%; ▌Steven J. Renshaw (Republican) 24.8%; ▌Robert H. Scott (Libertarian) 5.2%
California 26	Howard Berman	Democratic	1982	Incumbent re-elected.	▌ ✓ Howard Berman (Democratic) 61.1%; ▌Roy Dahlson (Republican) 34.8%; ▌Bernard Zimring (Libertarian) 4.1%
California 27	Mel Levine	Democratic	1982	Incumbent re-elected.	▌ ✓ Mel Levine (Democratic) 58.2%; ▌David Barrett Cohen (Republican) 37.2%; ▌Edward E. Ferrer (Peace and Freedom) 4.5%
California 28	Julian Dixon	Democratic	1978	Incumbent re-elected.	▌ ✓ Julian Dixon (Democratic) 72.7%; ▌George Z. Adams (Republican) 22.2%; ▌Bob Weber (Libertarian) 2.2%; ▌William R. Williams (Peace and Freedom) 2.8%
California 29	Augustus Hawkins	Democratic	1962	Incumbent retired. Democratic hold.	▌ ✓ Maxine Waters (Democratic) 79.4%; ▌Bill DeWitt (Republican) 18.6%; ▌Waheed R. Boctor (Libertarian) 2.0%
California 30	Matthew G. Martínez	Democratic	1982	Incumbent re-elected.	▌ ✓ Matthew G. Martínez (Democratic) 58.2%; ▌Reuben D. Franco (Republican) 37.0%; ▌G. Curtis Feger (Libertarian) 4.8%
California 31	Mervyn Dymally	Democratic	1982	Incumbent re-elected.	▌ ✓ Mervyn Dymally (Democratic) 67.1%; ▌Eunice N. Sato (Republican) 32.9%
California 32	Glenn M. Anderson	Democratic	1968	Incumbent re-elected.	▌ ✓ Glenn M. Anderson (Democratic) 61.5%; ▌Sanford W. Kahn (Republican) 38.5%
California 33	David Dreier	Republican	1980	Incumbent re-elected.	▌ ✓ David Dreier (Republican) 63.7%; ▌Georgia H. Webb (Democratic) 31.4%; ▌Gail Lightfoot (Libertarian) 4.9%
California 34	Esteban Torres	Democratic	1982	Incumbent re-elected.	▌ ✓ Esteban Torres (Democratic) 60.7%; ▌John Eastman (Republican) 39.3%
California 35	Jerry Lewis	Republican	1978	Incumbent re-elected.	▌ ✓ Jerry Lewis (Republican) 60.6%; ▌Barry Norton (Democratic) 32.9%; ▌Jerry Johnson (Libertarian) 6.5%
California 36	George Brown Jr.	Democratic	1962; 1970 (Retired); 1972	Incumbent re-elected.	▌ ✓ George Brown Jr. (Democratic) 52.7%; ▌Bob Hammock (Republican) 47.3%
California 37	Al McCandless	Republican	1982	Incumbent re-elected.	▌ ✓ Al McCandless (Republican) 49.8%; ▌Ralph Waite (Democratic) 44.8%; ▌Gary R. Odom (American Independent) 2.8%; ▌Bonnie Flickinger (Libertarian) 2.7%
California 38	Bob Dornan	Republican	1976; 1982 (retired); 1984	Incumbent re-elected.	▌ ✓ Bob Dornan (Republican) 58.1%; ▌Barbara Jackson (Democratic) 41.9%
California 39	William E. Dannemeyer	Republican	1978	Incumbent re-elected.	▌ ✓ William E. Dannemeyer (Republican) 65.3%; ▌Frank Hoffman (Democratic) 30.8%; ▌Maxine Bell Quirk (Peace and Freedom) 3.9%
California 40	Christopher Cox	Republican	1988	Incumbent re-elected.	▌ ✓ Christopher Cox (Republican) 67.6%; ▌Eugene Gratz (Democratic) 32.4%
California 41	Bill Lowery	Republican	1980	Incumbent re-elected.	▌ ✓ Bill Lowery (Republican) 49.2%; ▌Dan Kripke (Democratic) 43.6%; ▌Karen S. R. Works (Peace and Freedom) 7.2%
California 42	Dana Rohrabacher	Republican	1988	Incumbent re-elected.	▌ ✓ Dana Rohrabacher (Republican) 59.3%; ▌Guy C. Kimbrough (Democratic) 36.5%; ▌Richard Gibb Martin (Libertarian) 4.2%
California 43	Ron Packard	Republican	1982	Incumbent re-elected.	▌ ✓ Ron Packard (Republican) 68%; ▌Doug Hansen (Peace and Freedom) 18.1%; ▌Rick Arnold (Libertarian) 13.8%
California 44	Jim Bates	Democratic	1982	Incumbent lost re-election. Republican gain.	▌ ✓ Duke Cunningham (Republican) 46.3%; ▌Jim Bates (Democratic) 44.8%; ▌Donna White (Peace and Freedom) 4.8%; ▌John Wallner (Libertarian) 4%
California 45	Duncan L. Hunter	Republican	1980	Incumbent re-elected.	▌ ✓ Duncan L. Hunter (Republican) 72.8%; ▌Joseph B. Shea (Libertarian) 27.2%

== Colorado ==
District	Incumbent			This race	
District	Representative	Party	First elected	Results	Candidates
Colorado 1	Pat Schroeder	Democratic	1972	Incumbent re-elected.	▌ ✓ Pat Schroeder (Democratic) 63.7%; ▌Gloria Roemer (Republican) 36.3%
Colorado 2	David Skaggs	Democratic	1986	Incumbent re-elected.	▌ ✓ David Skaggs (Democratic) 60.7%; ▌Jason Lewis (Republican) 39.3%
Colorado 3	Ben Nighthorse Campbell	Democratic	1986	Incumbent re-elected.	▌ ✓ Ben Nighthorse Campbell (Democratic) 70.2%; ▌Bob Ellis (Republican) 28.2%; ▌Howard E. Fields (Populist) 1.6%
Colorado 4	Hank Brown	Republican	1980	Incumbent retired to run for U.S. Senator. Republican hold.	▌ ✓ Wayne Allard (Republican) 54.1%; ▌Dick Bond (Democratic) 45.9%
Colorado 5	Joel Hefley	Republican	1986	Incumbent re-elected.	▌ ✓ Joel Hefley (Republican) 66.4%; ▌Cal Johnston (Democratic) 30.0%; ▌Keith LeRoy Hamburger (Libertarian) 3.5%
Colorado 6	Daniel Schaefer	Republican	1983	Incumbent re-elected.	▌ ✓ Daniel Schaefer (Republican) 64.5%; ▌Don Jarrett (Democratic) 35.5%

== Connecticut ==
District	Incumbent			This race	
District	Representative	Party	First elected	Results	Candidates
Connecticut 1	Barbara B. Kennelly	Democratic	1982	Incumbent re-elected.	▌ ✓ Barbara B. Kennelly (Democratic) 71.4%; ▌James P. Garvey (Republican) 28.6%
Connecticut 2	Sam Gejdenson	Democratic	1980	Incumbent re-elected.	▌ ✓ Sam Gejdenson (Democratic) 59.7%; ▌John Ragsdale (Republican) 40.3%
Connecticut 3	Bruce Morrison	Democratic	1982	Incumbent retired to run for Connecticut governor. Democratic hold.	▌ ✓ Rosa DeLauro (Democratic) 52.1%; ▌Tom Scott (Republican) 47.9%
Connecticut 4	Chris Shays	Republican	1987 (special)	Incumbent re-elected.	▌ ✓ Chris Shays (Republican) 76.5%; ▌Al Smith (Democratic) 23.4%
Connecticut 5	John G. Rowland	Republican	1984	Incumbent retired to run for Connecticut governor. Republican hold.	▌ ✓ Gary Franks (Republican) 51.7%; ▌Toby Moffett (Democratic) 47.2%; ▌William G. Hare (Liberty) 1.0%
Connecticut 6	Nancy Johnson	Republican	1982	Incumbent re-elected.	▌ ✓ Nancy Johnson (Republican) 74.4%; ▌Paul Kulas (Democratic) 25.6%

== Delaware ==
District	Incumbent			This race	
District	Representative	Party	First elected	Results	Candidates
Delaware at-large	Tom Carper	Democratic	1982	Incumbent re-elected.	▌ ✓ Tom Carper (Democratic) 65.5%; ▌Ralph O. Williams (Republican) 32.7%; ▌Richard A. Cohen (Libertarian) 1.8%

== Florida ==
District	Incumbent			This race	
District	Representative	Party	First elected	Results	Candidates
Florida 1	Earl Hutto	Democratic	1978	Incumbent re-elected.	▌ ✓ Earl Hutto (Democratic) 52.2%; ▌Terry Ketchel (Republican) 47.8%
Florida 2	Bill Grant	Republican	1986	Incumbent lost re-election. Democratic gain.	▌ ✓ Pete Peterson (Democratic) 56.9%; ▌Bill Grant (Republican) 43.1%
Florida 3	Charles E. Bennett	Democratic	1948	Incumbent re-elected.	▌ ✓ Charles E. Bennett (Democratic) 72.7%; ▌Rod Sullivan (Republican) 27.3%
Florida 4	Craig James	Republican	1988	Incumbent re-elected.	▌ ✓ Craig James (Republican) 55.9%; ▌Reid Hughes (Democratic) 44.1%
Florida 5	Bill McCollum	Republican	1980	Incumbent re-elected.	▌ ✓ Bill McCollum (Republican) 59.9%; ▌Bob Fletcher (Democratic) 40.1%
Florida 6	Cliff Stearns	Republican	1988	Incumbent re-elected.	▌ ✓ Cliff Stearns (Republican) 59.2%; ▌Art Johnson (Democratic) 40.8%
Florida 7	Sam Gibbons	Democratic	1962	Incumbent re-elected.	▌ ✓ Sam Gibbons (Democratic) 67.6%; ▌Charles D. Prout (Republican) 32.4%
Florida 8	Bill Young	Republican	1970	Incumbent re-elected.	▌ ✓ Bill Young (Republican) 100%
Florida 9	Michael Bilirakis	Republican	1982	Incumbent re-elected.	▌ ✓ Michael Bilirakis (Republican) 58.1%; ▌Cheryl Davis Knapp (Democratic) 41.9%
Florida 10	Andy Ireland	Republican	1976	Incumbent re-elected.	▌ ✓ Andy Ireland (Republican) 100%
Florida 11	Bill Nelson	Democratic	1978	Incumbent retired to run for Florida Governor. Democratic hold.	▌ ✓ Jim Bacchus (Democratic) 51.9%; ▌Bill Tolley (Republican) 48.1%
Florida 12	Tom Lewis	Republican	1982	Incumbent re-elected.	▌ ✓ Tom Lewis (Republican) 100%
Florida 13	Porter Goss	Republican	1988	Incumbent re-elected.	▌ ✓ Porter Goss (Republican) 100%
Florida 14	Harry Johnston	Democratic	1988	Incumbent re-elected.	▌ ✓ Harry Johnston (Democratic) 66.0%; ▌Scott Shore (Republican) 34.0%
Florida 15	Clay Shaw	Republican	1980	Incumbent re-elected.	▌ ✓ Clay Shaw (Republican) 97.8%
Florida 16	Lawrence J. Smith	Democratic	1982	Incumbent re-elected.	▌ ✓ Lawrence J. Smith (Democratic) 100%
Florida 17	William Lehman	Democratic	1972	Incumbent re-elected.	▌ ✓ William Lehman (Democratic) 78.3%; ▌Earl Rodney (Republican) 21.7%
Florida 18	Ileana Ros-Lehtinen	Republican	1989	Incumbent re-elected.	▌ ✓ Ileana Ros-Lehtinen (Republican) 60.4%; ▌Bernard Anscher (Democratic) 39.6%
Florida 19	Dante Fascell	Democratic	1954	Incumbent re-elected.	▌ ✓ Dante Fascell (Democratic) 62.0%; ▌Bob Allen (Republican) 38.0%

== Georgia ==
District	Incumbent			This race	
District	Representative	Party	First elected	Results	Candidates
Georgia 1	Lindsay Thomas	Democratic	1982	Incumbent re-elected.	▌ ✓ Lindsay Thomas (Democratic) 71.2%; ▌Chris Meredith (Republican) 28.8%
Georgia 2	Charles Floyd Hatcher	Democratic	1980	Incumbent re-elected.	▌ ✓ Charles Floyd Hatcher (Democratic) 73.0%; ▌Jonathan Perry Waters (Republican) 27.0%
Georgia 3	Richard Ray	Democratic	1982	Incumbent re-elected.	▌ ✓ Richard Ray (Democratic) 63.2%; ▌Paul Broun (Republican) 36.8%
Georgia 4	Ben Jones	Democratic	1988	Incumbent re-elected.	▌ ✓ Ben Jones (Democratic) 52.4%; ▌John Linder (Republican) 47.6%
Georgia 5	John Lewis	Democratic	1986	Incumbent re-elected.	▌ ✓ John Lewis (Democratic) 75.6%; ▌J.W. Tibbs (Republican) 24.4%
Georgia 6	Newt Gingrich	Republican	1978	Incumbent re-elected.	▌ ✓ Newt Gingrich (Republican) 50.3%; ▌David Worley (Democratic) 49.7%
Georgia 7	George Darden	Democratic	1983	Incumbent re-elected.	▌ ✓ George Darden (Democratic) 60.1%; ▌Al Beverly (Republican) 39.9%
Georgia 8	J. Roy Rowland	Democratic	1982	Incumbent re-elected.	▌ ✓ J. Roy Rowland (Democratic) 68.7%; ▌Bob Cunningham (Republican) 31.3%
Georgia 9	Ed Jenkins	Democratic	1976	Incumbent re-elected.	▌ ✓ Ed Jenkins (Democratic) 55.8%; ▌Joe Hoffman (Republican) 44.2%
Georgia 10	Doug Barnard Jr.	Democratic	1976	Incumbent re-elected.	▌ ✓ Doug Barnard Jr. (Democratic) 58.3%; ▌Sam Jones (Republican) 41.7%

== Hawaii ==
District	Incumbent			This race	
District	Representative	Party	First elected	Results	Candidates
Hawaii 1	Pat Saiki	Republican	1986	Incumbent retired to run for U.S. Senator. Democratic gain.	▌ ✓ Neil Abercrombie (Democratic) 60.0%; ▌Mike Liu (Republican) 38.7%; ▌Roger Taylor (Libertarian) 1.3%
Hawaii 2	Daniel Akaka	Democratic	1976	Incumbent resigned May 15, 1990 to become U.S. senator. Democratic hold. Winner also elected to finish the current term.	▌ ✓ Patsy Mink (Democratic) 66.3%; ▌Andy Poepoe (Republican) 30.6%; ▌Lloyd Mallan (Libertarian) 3.1%

== Idaho ==
District	Incumbent			This race	
District	Representative	Party	First elected	Results	Candidates
Idaho 1	Larry Craig	Republican	1980	Incumbent retired to run for U.S. Senator. Democratic gain.	▌ ✓ Larry LaRocco (Democratic) 53.0%; ▌Skip Smyser (Republican) 47.0%
Idaho 2	Richard H. Stallings	Democratic	1984	Incumbent re-elected.	▌ ✓ Richard H. Stallings (Democratic) 63.6%; ▌Sean McDevitt (Republican) 36.4%

== Illinois ==
District	Incumbent			This race	
District	Representative	Party	First elected	Results	Candidates
Illinois 1	Charles Hayes	Democratic	1983 (special)	Incumbent re-elected.	▌ ✓ Charles Hayes (Democratic) 93.8%; ▌Babette Peyton (Republican) 6.2%
Illinois 2	Gus Savage	Democratic	1980	Incumbent re-elected.	▌ ✓ Gus Savage (Democratic) 78.2%; ▌William T. Hespel (Republican) 21.8%
Illinois 3	Marty Russo	Democratic	1974	Incumbent re-elected.	▌ ✓ Marty Russo (Democratic) 70.9%; ▌Carl L. Klein (Republican) 29.1%
Illinois 4	George E. Sangmeister	Democratic	1988	Incumbent re-elected.	▌ ✓ George E. Sangmeister (Democratic) 59.2%; ▌Manny Hoffman (Republican) 40.8%
Illinois 5	Bill Lipinski	Democratic	1982	Incumbent re-elected.	▌ ✓ Bill Lipinski (Democratic) 66.3%; ▌David J. Shestokas (Republican) 31.0%; ▌Ron Bartos (Solidarity) 2.7%
Illinois 6	Henry Hyde	Republican	1974	Incumbent re-elected.	▌ ✓ Henry Hyde (Republican) 66.7%; ▌Robert J. Cassidy (Democratic) 33.3%
Illinois 7	Cardiss Collins	Democratic	1973 (special)	Incumbent re-elected.	▌ ✓ Cardiss Collins (Democratic) 79.9%; ▌Michael Dooley (Republican) 20.1%
Illinois 8	Dan Rostenkowski	Democratic	1958	Incumbent re-elected.	▌ ✓ Dan Rostenkowski (Democratic) 79.1%; ▌Robert Marshall (Libertarian) 20.9%
Illinois 9	Sidney R. Yates	Democratic	1948; 1962 (retired); 1964	Incumbent re-elected.	▌ ✓ Sidney R. Yates (Democratic) 71.2%; ▌Herb Sohn (Republican) 28.8%
Illinois 10	John Porter	Republican	1980	Incumbent re-elected.	▌ ✓ John Porter (Republican) 67.8%; ▌Peg McNamara (Democratic) 30.8%; ▌Herbert L. Gorrell (Solidarity) 1.5%
Illinois 11	Frank Annunzio	Democratic	1964	Incumbent re-elected.	▌ ✓ Frank Annunzio (Democratic) 53.6%; ▌Walter Dudycz (Republican) 44.6%; ▌Larry Saska (Solidarity) 1.7%
Illinois 12	Phil Crane	Republican	1969 (special)	Incumbent re-elected.	▌ ✓ Phil Crane (Republican) 82.2%; ▌Steve Pedersen (Solidarity) 17.8%
Illinois 13	Harris Fawell	Republican	1984	Incumbent re-elected.	▌ ✓ Harris Fawell (Republican) 65.8%; ▌Steven K. Thomas (Democratic) 34.2%
Illinois 14	Dennis Hastert	Republican	1986	Incumbent re-elected.	▌ ✓ Dennis Hastert (Republican) 66.9%; ▌Donald J. Westphal (Democratic) 33.1%
Illinois 15	Edward Rell Madigan	Republican	1972	Incumbent re-elected.	▌ ✓ Edward Rell Madigan (Republican) 100%
Illinois 16	Lynn M. Martin	Republican	1980	Incumbent retired to run for U.S. Senator. Democratic gain.	▌ ✓ John W. Cox Jr. (Democratic) 54.6%; ▌John W. Hallock Jr. (Republican) 45.4%
Illinois 17	Lane Evans	Democratic	1982	Incumbent re-elected.	▌ ✓ Lane Evans (Democratic) 66.5%; ▌Dan Lee (Republican) 33.5%
Illinois 18	Robert H. Michel	Republican	1956	Incumbent re-elected.	▌ ✓ Robert H. Michel (Republican) 98.4%
Illinois 19	Terry L. Bruce	Democratic	1984	Incumbent re-elected.	▌ ✓ Terry L. Bruce (Democratic) 66.3%; ▌Robert F. Kerans (Republican) 32.4%; ▌Brian James O'Neill II (Solidarity) 1.4%
Illinois 20	Dick Durbin	Democratic	1982	Incumbent re-elected.	▌ ✓ Dick Durbin (Democratic) 66.2%; ▌Paul Jurgens (Republican) 33.8%
Illinois 21	Jerry Costello	Democratic	1988	Incumbent re-elected.	▌ ✓ Jerry Costello (Democratic) 66.0%; ▌Bob Gaffner (Republican) 34.0%
Illinois 22	Glenn Poshard	Democratic	1988	Incumbent re-elected.	▌ ✓ Glenn Poshard (Democratic) 83.7%; ▌Jim Wham (Independent) 16.3%

== Indiana ==
District	Incumbent			This race	
District	Representative	Party	First elected	Results	Candidates
Indiana 1	Pete Visclosky	Democratic	1984	Incumbent re-elected.	▌ ✓ Pete Visclosky (Democratic) 66.0%; ▌William Costas (Republican) 34.0%
Indiana 2	Philip Sharp	Democratic	1974	Incumbent re-elected.	▌ ✓ Philip Sharp (Democratic) 59.4%; ▌Mike Pence (Republican) 40.6%
Indiana 3	John P. Hiler	Republican	1980	Incumbent lost re-election. Democratic gain.	▌ ✓ Tim Roemer (Democratic) 50.9%; ▌John P. Hiler (Republican) 49.1%
Indiana 4	Jill Long	Democratic	1989	Incumbent re-elected.	▌ ✓ Jill Long (Democratic) 60.7%; ▌Richard Walter Hawks (Republican) 39.3%
Indiana 5	Jim Jontz	Democratic	1986	Incumbent re-elected.	▌ ✓ Jim Jontz (Democratic) 53.1%; ▌John Arthur Johnson (Republican) 46.9%
Indiana 6	Dan Burton	Republican	1982	Incumbent re-elected.	▌ ✓ Dan Burton (Republican) 63.5%; ▌James Philip Fadely (Democratic) 36.5%
Indiana 7	John T. Myers	Republican	1966	Incumbent re-elected.	▌ ✓ John T. Myers (Republican) 57.6%; ▌John William Riley Sr. (Democratic) 42.4%
Indiana 8	Frank McCloskey	Democratic	1982	Incumbent re-elected.	▌ ✓ Frank McCloskey (Democratic) 54.7%; ▌Richard Mourdock (Republican) 45.3%
Indiana 9	Lee H. Hamilton	Democratic	1964	Incumbent re-elected.	▌ ✓ Lee H. Hamilton (Democratic) 69.0%; ▌Floyd Coates (Republican) 31.0%
Indiana 10	Andrew Jacobs Jr.	Democratic	1964; 1972 (defeated); 1974	Incumbent re-elected.	▌ ✓ Andrew Jacobs Jr. (Democratic) 66.4%; ▌János Horváth (Republican) 33.6%

== Iowa ==
District	Incumbent			This race	
District	Representative	Party	First elected	Results	Candidates
Iowa 1	Jim Leach	Republican	1976	Incumbent re-elected.	▌ ✓ Jim Leach (Republican) 99.8%
Iowa 2	Tom Tauke	Republican	1978	Incumbent retired to run for U.S. Senator. Republican hold.	▌ ✓ Jim Nussle (Republican) 49.8%; ▌Eric Tabor (Democratic) 48.8%; ▌Jan J. Zonneveld (Independent) 1.4%
Iowa 3	David R. Nagle	Democratic	1986	Incumbent re-elected.	▌ ✓ David R. Nagle (Democratic) 99.2%
Iowa 4	Neal Smith	Democratic	1958	Incumbent re-elected.	▌ ✓ Neal Smith (Democratic) 97.9%
Iowa 5	Jim Ross Lightfoot	Republican	1984	Incumbent re-elected.	▌ ✓ Jim Ross Lightfoot (Republican) 68.0%; ▌Rod Powell (Democratic) 32.0%
Iowa 6	Fred Grandy	Republican	1986	Incumbent re-elected.	▌ ✓ Fred Grandy (Republican) 71.8%; ▌Mike D. Earll (Democratic) 28.2%

== Kansas ==
District	Incumbent			This race	
District	Representative	Party	First elected	Results	Candidates
Kansas 1	Pat Roberts	Republican	1980	Incumbent re-elected.	▌ ✓ Pat Roberts (Republican) 62.6%; ▌Duane West (Democratic) 37.3%
Kansas 2	Jim Slattery	Democratic	1982	Incumbent re-elected.	▌ ✓ Jim Slattery (Democratic) 62.8%; ▌Scott Morgan (Republican) 37.2%
Kansas 3	Jan Meyers	Republican	1984	Incumbent re-elected.	▌ ✓ Jan Meyers (Republican) 60.1%; ▌Leroy Jones (Democratic) 39.9%
Kansas 4	Dan Glickman	Democratic	1976	Incumbent re-elected.	▌ ✓ Dan Glickman (Democratic) 70.8%; ▌Roger M. Grund Sr. (Republican) 29.2%
Kansas 5	Bob Whittaker	Republican	1978	Incumbent retired. Republican hold.	▌ ✓ Dick Nichols (Republican) 59.3%; ▌George D. Wingert (Democratic) 40.7%

== Kentucky ==
District	Incumbent			This race	
District	Representative	Party	First elected	Results	Candidates
Kentucky 1	Carroll Hubbard	Democratic	1974	Incumbent re-elected.	▌ ✓ Carroll Hubbard (Democratic) 86.9%; ▌Marvin Seat (Populist) 13.1%
Kentucky 2	William Natcher	Democratic	1953	Incumbent re-elected.	▌ ✓ William Natcher (Democratic) 66.0%; ▌Martin Tori (Republican) 34.0%
Kentucky 3	Romano Mazzoli	Democratic	1970	Incumbent re-elected.	▌ ✓ Romano Mazzoli (Democratic) 60.6%; ▌Al Brown (Republican) 39.4%
Kentucky 4	Jim Bunning	Republican	1986	Incumbent re-elected.	▌ ✓ Jim Bunning (Republican) 69.3%; ▌Galen Martin (Democratic) 30.7%
Kentucky 5	Hal Rogers	Republican	1980	Incumbent re-elected.	▌ ✓ Hal Rogers (Republican) 100%
Kentucky 6	Larry J. Hopkins	Republican	1978	Incumbent re-elected.	▌ ✓ Larry J. Hopkins (Republican) 100%
Kentucky 7	Chris Perkins	Democratic	1984	Incumbent re-elected.	▌ ✓ Chris Perkins (Democratic) 50.8%; ▌Will T. Scott (Republican) 49.2%

== Louisiana ==
Six incumbents were re=elected by receiving more than 50% of the vote in their Oct. 6 jungle primary. Baker was automatically re-elected without having to appear on a ballot.

District	Incumbent			This race	
District	Representative	Party	First elected	Results	Candidates
Louisiana 1	Bob Livingston	Republican	1977 (special)	Incumbent re-elected.	▌ ✓ Bob Livingston (Republican) 83.9%; ▌Vincent J. Bruno (Republican) 16.1%
Louisiana 2	Lindy Boggs	Democratic	1973 (special)	Incumbent retired. Democratic hold.	General election: ▌ William Jefferson (Democratic) 24.4%; ▌ Marc Morial (Democratic) 22.2%; ▌Jon D. Johnson (Democratic) 19.3%; ▌Woody Koppel (Democratic) 18.3%; ▌Edgar Chase (Democratic) 6.8%; ▌Michael G. Bagneris (Democratic) 3.6%; ▌Jeffrey A. Barach (Republican) 2.3%; ▌Jane Ettinger Booth (Independent) 1.3%; ▌Roger C. Johnson (Republican) 0.9%; ▌Michael G. Roccaforte (Independent) 0.3%; ▌Leon Waters (Independent) 0.2%; Runoff: ▌ ✓ William Jefferson (Democratic) 52.5%; ▌Marc Morial (Democratic) 47.5%
Louisiana 3	Billy Tauzin	Democratic	1980	Incumbent re-elected.	▌ ✓ Billy Tauzin (Democratic) 87.9%; ▌Ronald P. Duplantis (Independent) 8.4%; ▌Millard Clement (Independent) 3.7%
Louisiana 4	Jim McCrery	Republican	1988	Incumbent re-elected.	▌ ✓ Jim McCrery (Republican) 54.7%; ▌Foster Campbell (Democratic) 45.3%
Louisiana 5	Jerry Huckaby	Democratic	1976	Incumbent re-elected.	▌ ✓ Jerry Huckaby (Democratic) 73.7%; ▌Carl Batey (Democratic) 13.8%; ▌Bradley T. Roark (Republican) 9.4%; ▌L. D. Knox (Independent) 3.1%
Louisiana 6	Richard Baker	Republican	1986	Incumbent re-elected.	▌ ✓ Richard Baker (Republican); Uncontested
Louisiana 7	Jimmy Hayes	Democratic	1986	Incumbent re-elected.	▌ ✓ Jimmy Hayes (Democratic) 57.7%; ▌David Thibodaux (Republican) 38.2%; ▌John H. Myers (Democratic) 4.1%
Louisiana 8	Clyde C. Holloway	Republican	1986	Incumbent re-elected.	▌ ✓ Clyde C. Holloway (Republican) 56.4%; ▌Cleo Fields (Democratic) 29.6%; ▌Joe McPherson (Democratic) 14.0%

== Maine ==
District	Incumbent			This race	
District	Representative	Party	First elected	Results	Candidates
Maine 1	Joseph E. Brennan	Democratic	1986	Incumbent retired to run for Maine Governor. Democratic hold.	▌ ✓ Thomas Andrews (Democratic) 60.1%; ▌David F. Emery (Republican) 39.7%
Maine 2	Olympia Snowe	Republican	1978	Incumbent re-elected.	▌ ✓ Olympia Snowe (Republican) 51.0%; ▌Patrick K. McGowan (Democratic) 49.0%

== Maryland ==
District	Incumbent			This race	
District	Representative	Party	First elected	Results	Candidates
Maryland 1	Roy Dyson	Democratic	1980	Incumbent lost re-election. Republican gain.	▌ ✓ Wayne Gilchrest (Republican) 56.8%; ▌Roy Dyson (Democratic) 43.2%
Maryland 2	Helen Delich Bentley	Republican	1984	Incumbent re-elected.	▌ ✓ Helen Delich Bentley (Republican) 74.4%; ▌Ronald P. Bowers (Democratic) 25.6%
Maryland 3	Ben Cardin	Democratic	1986	Incumbent re-elected.	▌ ✓ Ben Cardin (Democratic) 69.7%; ▌Harwood Nichols (Republican) 30.3%
Maryland 4	Tom McMillen	Democratic	1986	Incumbent re-elected.	▌ ✓ Tom McMillen (Democratic) 58.9%; ▌Bob Duckworth (Republican) 41.1%
Maryland 5	Steny Hoyer	Democratic	1981	Incumbent re-elected.	▌ ✓ Steny Hoyer (Democratic) 80.7%; ▌Lee F. Breuer (Republican) 19.3%
Maryland 6	Beverly Byron	Democratic	1978	Incumbent re-elected.	▌ ✓ Beverly Byron (Democratic) 65.3%; ▌Christopher P. Fiotes Jr. (Republican) 34.7%
Maryland 7	Kweisi Mfume	Democratic	1986	Incumbent re-elected.	▌ ✓ Kweisi Mfume (Democratic) 85.0%; ▌Kenneth Kondner (Republican) 15.0%
Maryland 8	Connie Morella	Republican	1986	Incumbent re-elected.	▌ ✓ Connie Morella (Republican) 73.5%; ▌James Walker Jr. (Democratic) 22.3%; ▌Sydney Altman (Independent) 4.2%

== Massachusetts ==
District	Incumbent			This race	
District	Representative	Party	First elected	Results	Candidates
Massachusetts 1	Silvio O. Conte	Republican	1958	Incumbent re-elected.	▌ ✓ Silvio O. Conte (Republican) 77.5%; ▌John R. Arden (Democratic) 22.4%
Massachusetts 2	Richard Neal	Democratic	1988	Incumbent re-elected.	▌ ✓ Richard Neal (Democratic) 99.8%
Massachusetts 3	Joseph D. Early	Democratic	1974	Incumbent re-elected.	▌ ✓ Joseph D. Early (Democratic) 99.4%
Massachusetts 4	Barney Frank	Democratic	1980	Incumbent re-elected.	▌ ✓ Barney Frank (Democratic) 65.5%; ▌John R. Soto (Republican) 34.5%
Massachusetts 5	Chester G. Atkins	Democratic	1984	Incumbent re-elected.	▌ ✓ Chester G. Atkins (Democratic) 52.2%; ▌John MacGovern (Republican) 47.8%
Massachusetts 6	Nicholas Mavroules	Democratic	1978	Incumbent re-elected.	▌ ✓ Nicholas Mavroules (Democratic) 65.0%; ▌Edgar L. Kelley (Republican) 34.9%
Massachusetts 7	Ed Markey	Democratic	1976	Incumbent re-elected.	▌ ✓ Ed Markey (Democratic) 99.9%
Massachusetts 8	Joseph P. Kennedy II	Democratic	1986	Incumbent re-elected.	▌ ✓ Joseph P. Kennedy II (Democratic) 72.2%; ▌Glenn W. Fiscus (Republican) 22.6%; ▌Susan C. Davies (New Alliance) 5.1%
Massachusetts 9	Joe Moakley	Democratic	1972	Incumbent re-elected.	▌ ✓ Joe Moakley (Democratic) 70.3%; ▌Robert W. Horan (Independent) 29.7%
Massachusetts 10	Gerry Studds	Democratic	1972	Incumbent re-elected.	▌ ✓ Gerry Studds (Democratic) 53.4%; ▌Jon L. Bryan (Republican) 46.6%
Massachusetts 11	Brian J. Donnelly	Democratic	1978	Incumbent re-elected.	▌ ✓ Brian J. Donnelly (Democratic) 99.7%

== Michigan ==
District	Incumbent			This race	
District	Representative	Party	First elected	Results	Candidates
Michigan 1	John Conyers	Democratic	1964	Incumbent re-elected.	▌ ✓ John Conyers (Democratic) 89.3%; ▌Ray Shoulders (Republican) 8.5%; ▌Robert Mays (Independent) 1.3%; ▌Jonathan Paul Flint (Libertarian) 0.9%
Michigan 2	Carl Pursell	Republican	1976	Incumbent re-elected.	▌ ✓ Carl Pursell (Republican) 64.1%; ▌Elmer White (Democratic) 33.2%; ▌Paul Steven Jensen (Tisch) 2.8%
Michigan 3	Howard Wolpe	Democratic	1978	Incumbent re-elected.	▌ ✓ Howard Wolpe (Democratic) 57.9%; ▌Brad Haskins (Republican) 42.1%
Michigan 4	Fred Upton	Republican	1986	Incumbent re-elected.	▌ ✓ Fred Upton (Republican) 57.8%; ▌JoAnne McFarland (Democratic) 42.3%
Michigan 5	Paul B. Henry	Republican	1984	Incumbent re-elected.	▌ ✓ Paul B. Henry (Republican) 75.4%; ▌Thomas Trzybinski (Democratic) 24.6%
Michigan 6	Bob Carr	Democratic	1974; 1980 (defeated); 1982	Incumbent re-elected.	▌ ✓ Bob Carr (Democratic) 99.8%
Michigan 7	Dale Kildee	Democratic	1976	Incumbent re-elected.	▌ ✓ Dale Kildee (Democratic) 68.4%; ▌David J. Morrill (Republican) 31.6%
Michigan 8	J. Bob Traxler	Democratic	1974	Incumbent re-elected.	▌ ✓ J. Bob Traxler (Democratic) 68.6%; ▌James White (Republican) 31.4%
Michigan 9	Guy Vander Jagt	Republican	1966	Incumbent re-elected.	▌ ✓ Guy Vander Jagt (Republican) 54.8%; ▌Geraldine Greene (Democratic) 45.2%
Michigan 10	Bill Schuette	Republican	1984	Incumbent retired to run for U.S. Senator. Republican hold.	▌ ✓ Dave Camp (Republican) 65.0%; ▌Joan Dennison (Democratic) 33.1%; ▌Charles Congdon (Libertarian) 1.6%
Michigan 11	Robert William Davis	Republican	1978	Incumbent re-elected.	▌ ✓ Robert William Davis (Republican) 61.3%; ▌Marcia Gould (Democratic) 38.7%
Michigan 12	David Bonior	Democratic	1976	Incumbent re-elected.	▌ ✓ David Bonior (Democratic) 64.7%; ▌Jim Dingeman (Republican) 33.7%; ▌Robert W. Roddis (Libertarian) 1.6%
Michigan 13	George Crockett Jr.	Democratic	1980	Incumbent retired. Democratic hold.	▌ ✓ Barbara-Rose Collins (Democratic) 80.1%; ▌Carl R. Edwards. Sr. (Republican) 16.5%; ▌Joyce Ann Griffin (Workers World) 1.6%; Others: ▌Jeff Hampton (Libertarian) 1.0%; ▌Cleve Andrew Pulley (Independent) 0.8%
Michigan 14	Dennis Hertel	Democratic	1980	Incumbent re-elected.	▌ ✓ Dennis Hertel (Democratic) 63.6%; ▌Kenneth C. McNealy (Republican) 32.8%; ▌Robert John Gale (Tisch) 2.2%; ▌Kenneth G. Morris (Libertarian) 1.4%
Michigan 15	William D. Ford	Democratic	1964	Incumbent re-elected.	▌ ✓ William D. Ford (Democratic) 61.2%; ▌Burl C. Adkins (Republican) 36.6%; ▌David R. Hunt (Libertarian) 2.2%
Michigan 16	John Dingell	Democratic	1955	Incumbent re-elected.	▌ ✓ John Dingell (Democratic) 66.6%; ▌Frank Beaumont (Republican) 31.9%; ▌Roger Conant Pope (Libertarian) 1.5%
Michigan 17	Sander Levin	Democratic	1982	Incumbent re-elected.	▌ ✓ Sander Levin (Democratic) 69.7%; ▌Blaine Lankford (Republican) 30.3%
Michigan 18	William Broomfield	Republican	1956	Incumbent re-elected.	▌ ✓ William Broomfield (Republican) 66.4%; ▌Walter Briggs (Democratic) 33.6%

== Minnesota ==
District	Incumbent			This race	
District	Representative	Party	First elected	Results	Candidates
Minnesota 1	Tim Penny	DFL	1982	Incumbent re-elected.	▌ ✓ Tim Penny (DFL) 78.1%; ▌Doug Andersen (Ind.-Republican) 21.9%
Minnesota 2	Vin Weber	Independent- Republican	1980	Incumbent re-elected.	▌ ✓ Vin Weber (Ind.-Republican) 61.8%; ▌Jim Stone (DFL) 38.1%
Minnesota 3	Bill Frenzel	Independent- Republican	1970	Incumbent retired. Independent-Republican hold.	▌ ✓ Jim Ramstad (Ind.-Republican) 66.9%; ▌Lou DeMars (DFL) 32.9%
Minnesota 4	Bruce Vento	DFL	1976	Incumbent re-elected.	▌ ✓ Bruce Vento (DFL) 64.8%; ▌Ian Maitland (Ind.-Republican) 35.1%
Minnesota 5	Martin Olav Sabo	DFL	1978	Incumbent re-elected.	▌ ✓ Martin Olav Sabo (DFL) 72.7%; ▌Raymond C. Gilbertson (Ind.-Republican) 27.0%
Minnesota 6	Gerry Sikorski	DFL	1982	Incumbent re-elected.	▌ ✓ Gerry Sikorski (DFL) 64.6%; ▌Bruce Anderson (Ind.-Republican) 35.3%
Minnesota 7	Arlan Stangeland	Independent- Republican	1977	Incumbent lost re-election. DFL gain.	▌ ✓ Collin Peterson (DFL) 53.5%; ▌Arlan Stangeland (Ind.-Republican) 46.4%
Minnesota 8	Jim Oberstar	DFL	1974	Incumbent re-elected.	▌ ✓ Jim Oberstar (DFL) 72.9%; ▌Jerry Shuster (Ind.-Republican) 27.1%

== Mississippi ==
District	Incumbent			This race	
District	Representative	Party	First elected	Results	Candidates
Mississippi 1	Jamie Whitten	Democratic	1941	Incumbent re-elected.	▌ ✓ Jamie Whitten (Democratic) 64.9%; ▌Bill Bowlin (Republican) 35.1%
Mississippi 2	Mike Espy	Democratic	1986	Incumbent re-elected.	▌ ✓ Mike Espy (Democratic) 84.1%; ▌Dorothy Benford (Republican) 15.9%
Mississippi 3	Sonny Montgomery	Democratic	1966	Incumbent re-elected.	▌ ✓ Sonny Montgomery (Democratic) 100%
Mississippi 4	Michael Parker	Democratic	1988	Incumbent re-elected.	▌ ✓ Michael Parker (Democratic) 80.6%; ▌Jerry Parks (Republican) 19.4%
Mississippi 5	Gene Taylor	Democratic	1989	Incumbent re-elected.	▌ ✓ Gene Taylor (Democratic) 81.4%; ▌Sheila Smith (Republican) 18.6%

== Missouri ==
District	Incumbent			This race	
District	Representative	Party	First elected	Results	Candidates
Missouri 1	Bill Clay	Democratic	1968	Incumbent re-elected.	▌ ✓ Bill Clay (Democratic) 60.9%; ▌Wayne G. Piotrowski (Republican) 39.1%
Missouri 2	Jack Buechner	Republican	1986	Incumbent lost re-election. Democratic gain.	▌ ✓ Joan Kelly Horn (Democratic) 50.01%; ▌Jack Buechner (Republican) 49.99%
Missouri 3	Dick Gephardt	Democratic	1976	Incumbent re-elected.	▌ ✓ Dick Gephardt (Democratic) 56.8%; ▌Mack Holekamp (Republican) 43.2%
Missouri 4	Ike Skelton	Democratic	1976	Incumbent re-elected.	▌ ✓ Ike Skelton (Democratic) 61.8%; ▌David Eyerly (Republican) 38.2%
Missouri 5	Alan Wheat	Democratic	1982	Incumbent re-elected.	▌ ✓ Alan Wheat (Democratic) 62.1%; ▌Robert H. Gardner (Republican) 37.9%
Missouri 6	Tom Coleman	Republican	1976	Incumbent re-elected.	▌ ✓ Tom Coleman (Republican) 51.9%; ▌Bob McClure (Democratic) 48.1%
Missouri 7	Mel Hancock	Republican	1988	Incumbent re-elected.	▌ ✓ Mel Hancock (Republican) 52.1%; ▌Pat Deaton (Republican) 47.9%
Missouri 8	Bill Emerson	Republican	1980	Incumbent re-elected.	▌ ✓ Bill Emerson (Republican) 57.3%; ▌Russ Carnahan (Democratic) 42.7%
Missouri 9	Harold Volkmer	Democratic	1976	Incumbent re-elected.	▌ ✓ Harold Volkmer (Democratic) 57.5%; ▌Don Curtis (Republican) 42.5%

== Montana ==
District	Incumbent			This race	
District	Representative	Party	First elected	Results	Candidates
Montana 1	Pat Williams	Democratic	1978	Incumbent re-elected.	▌ ✓ Pat Williams (Democratic) 61.1%; ▌Brad Johnson (Republican) 38.9%
Montana 2	Ron Marlenee	Republican	1976	Incumbent re-elected.	▌ ✓ Ron Marlenee (Republican) 63.0%; ▌Don Burris (Democratic) 37.0%

== Nebraska ==
District	Incumbent			This race	
District	Representative	Party	First elected	Results	Candidates
Nebraska 1	Doug Bereuter	Republican	1978	Incumbent re-elected.	▌ ✓ Doug Bereuter (Republican) 64.7%; ▌Larry Hall (Democratic) 35.2%
Nebraska 2	Peter Hoagland	Democratic	1988	Incumbent re-elected.	▌ ✓ Peter Hoagland (Democratic) 57.9%; ▌Ally Milder (Republican) 41.8%
Nebraska 3	Virginia D. Smith	Republican	1974	Incumbent retired. Republican hold.	▌ ✓ Bill Barrett (Republican) 51.1%; ▌Sandra K. Scofield (Democratic) 48.8%

== Nevada ==
District	Incumbent			This race	
District	Representative	Party	First elected	Results	Candidates
Nevada 1	James Bilbray	Democratic	1986	Incumbent re-elected.	▌ ✓ James Bilbray (Democratic) 64.4%; ▌Robert Dickinson (Republican) 34.4%; ▌William Moore (Libertarian) 4.2%
Nevada 2	Barbara Vucanovich	Republican	1982	Incumbent re-elected.	▌ ✓ Barbara Vucanovich (Republican) 59.1%; ▌Jane Wisdom (Democratic) 34.0%; ▌Dan Becan (Libertarian) 6.9%

== New Hampshire ==
District	Incumbent			This race	
District	Representative	Party	First elected	Results	Candidates
New Hampshire 1	Bob Smith	Republican	1986	Incumbent retired to run for U.S. Senator. Republican hold.	▌ ✓ Bill Zeliff (Republican) 64.4%; ▌Joe Keefe (Democratic) 34.6%
New Hampshire 2	Charles Douglas III	Republican	1988	Incumbent lost re-election. Democratic gain.	▌ ✓ Richard Swett (Democratic) 52.6%; ▌Charles Douglas III (Republican) 47.3%

== New Jersey ==
District	Incumbent			This race	
District	Representative	Party	First elected	Results	Candidates
New Jersey 1	Vacant			James Florio (D) resigned January 16, 1990 to become Governor. Democratic hold. Winner also elected to finish the current term.	▌ ✓ Rob Andrews (Democratic) 54.1%; ▌Daniel J. Mangini (Republican) 42.8%; ▌Jerry Zeldin (Libertarian) 1.2%; ▌Walter E. Konstanty (Independent) 1.1%; ▌William Henry Harris (Populist) 0.8%
New Jersey 2	William J. Hughes	Democratic	1974	Incumbent re-elected.	▌ ✓ William J. Hughes (Democratic) 88.2%; ▌William A. Kanengiser (Populist) 11.8%
New Jersey 3	Frank Pallone	Democratic	1988	Incumbent re-elected.	▌ ✓ Frank Pallone (Democratic) 49.1%; ▌Paul A. Kapalko (Republican) 46.5%; ▌Richard D. McKean (Independent) 2.8%; ▌William Stewart (Libertarian) 1.2%; ▌Joseph A. Plonski (Populist) 0.5%
New Jersey 4	Chris Smith	Republican	1980	Incumbent re-elected.	▌ ✓ Chris Smith (Republican) 62.7%; ▌Mark Setaro (Democratic) 34.5%; ▌Carl Peters (Libertarian) 1.4%; Others: ▌Joseph J. Notarangelo (Populist) 0.8%; ▌J. M. Carter (Independent) 0.6%
New Jersey 5	Marge Roukema	Republican	1980	Incumbent re-elected.	▌ ✓ Marge Roukema (Republican) 75.7%; ▌Lawrence Wayne Olsen (Democratic) 22.4%; ▌Mark Richards (Populist) 1.9%
New Jersey 6	Bernard J. Dwyer	Democratic	1980	Incumbent re-elected.	▌ ✓ Bernard J. Dwyer (Democratic) 50.6%; ▌Paul Danielczyk (Republican) 46.1%; ▌Randolph Waller (Populist) 1.9%; ▌Howard F. Schoen (Libertarian) 1.4%
New Jersey 7	Matthew John Rinaldo	Republican	1972	Incumbent re-elected.	▌ ✓ Matthew John Rinaldo (Republican) 74.6%; ▌Bruce Bergen (Democratic) 23.2%; ▌Thomas V. Sarnowski (Populist) 2.2%
New Jersey 8	Robert A. Roe	Democratic	1969	Incumbent re-elected.	▌ ✓ Robert A. Roe (Democratic) 76.9%; ▌Stephen Sibilia (Independent) 18.2%; ▌Bruce Eden (Populist) 4.9%
New Jersey 9	Robert Torricelli	Democratic	1982	Incumbent re-elected.	▌ ✓ Robert Torricelli (Democratic) 53.3%; ▌Peter J. Russo (Republican) 45.0%; ▌Chester Grabowski (Populist) 1.7%
New Jersey 10	Donald M. Payne	Democratic	1988	Incumbent re-elected.	▌ ✓ Donald M. Payne (Democratic) 81.4%; ▌Howard E. Berkeley (Republican) 17.3%; ▌George Mehrabian (Socialist Workers) 1.2%
New Jersey 11	Dean Gallo	Republican	1984	Incumbent re-elected.	▌ ✓ Dean Gallo (Republican) 64.5%; ▌Michael Gordon (Democratic) 33.0%; ▌Jasper C. Gould (Populist) 2.5%
New Jersey 12	Jim Courter	Republican	1978	Incumbent retired. Republican hold.	▌ ✓ Dick Zimmer (Republican) 64.0%; ▌Marguerite Chandler (Democratic) 31.0%; ▌Joan I. Bottchor (Independent) 2.6%; ▌C. Max Kortepeter (Independent) 1.4%; ▌Joseph J. Notarangelo (Populist) 0.8%
New Jersey 13	Jim Saxton	Republican	1984	Incumbent re-elected.	▌ ✓ Jim Saxton (Republican) 58.2%; ▌John Adler (Democratic) 39.4%; ▌Howard Scott Pearlman (Independent) 2.4%
New Jersey 14	Frank Joseph Guarini	Democratic	1978	Incumbent re-elected.	▌ ✓ Frank Joseph Guarini (Democratic) 66.2%; ▌Fred J. Theemling Jr. (Republican) 29.2%; ▌Michael Ziruolo (Independent) 2.1%; ▌Jane Harris (Socialist Workers) 1.5%; Others: ▌Donald K. Stoveken (Populist) 0.6%; ▌Louis Vernotico (Independent) 0.4%

== New Mexico ==
District	Incumbent			This race	
District	Representative	Party	First elected	Results	Candidates
New Mexico 1	Steven Schiff	Republican	1988	Incumbent re-elected.	▌ ✓ Steven Schiff (Republican) 70.2%; ▌Rebecca Vigil-Giron (Democratic) 29.8%
New Mexico 2	Joe Skeen	Republican	1980	Incumbent re-elected.	▌ ✓ Joe Skeen (Republican); Uncontested
New Mexico 3	Bill Richardson	Democratic	1982	Incumbent re-elected.	▌ ✓ Bill Richardson (Democratic) 74.5%; ▌Phil T. Archuletta (Republican) 25.5%

== New York ==
District	Incumbent			This race	
District	Representative	Party	First elected	Results	Candidates
New York 1	George J. Hochbrueckner	Democratic	1986	Incumbent re-elected.	▌ ✓ George J. Hochbrueckner (Democratic) 56.3%; ▌Francis W. Creighton (Republican) 34.7%; ▌Jerry Zeldin (Conservative) 5.2%; ▌Peter J. O'Hara (Right to Life) 3.8%
New York 2	Thomas J. Downey	Democratic	1974	Incumbent re-elected.	▌ ✓ Thomas Downey (Democratic) 55.8%; ▌John W. Bugler (Republican) 36.2%; ▌Dominic A. Curcio (Conservative) 8.0%
New York 3	Robert J. Mrazek	Democratic	1982	Incumbent re-elected.	▌ ✓ Robert J. Mrazek (Democratic) 53.3%; ▌Robert Previdi (Republican) 43.1%; ▌Francis A. Dreger (Right to Life) 3.6%
New York 4	Norman F. Lent	Republican	1970	Incumbent re-elected.	▌ ✓ Norman F. Lent (Republican) 61.2%; ▌Francis T. Goban (Democratic) 31.9%; ▌John J. Dunkle (Right to Life) 5.2%; ▌Ben-Zion J. Heyman (Liberal) 1.8%
New York 5	Raymond J. McGrath	Republican	1980	Incumbent re-elected.	▌ ✓ Raymond J. McGrath (Republican) 54.6%; ▌Mark S. Epstein (Democratic) 40.9%; ▌Edward K. Kitt (Right to Life) 4.6%
New York 6	Floyd Flake	Democratic	1986	Incumbent re-elected.	▌ ✓ Floyd Flake (Democratic) 73.1%; ▌William Sampol (Republican) 21.8%; ▌John Cronin (Right to Life) 5.1%
New York 7	Gary Ackerman	Democratic	1983	Incumbent re-elected.	▌ ✓ Gary Ackerman (Democratic) 100%
New York 8	James H. Scheuer	Democratic	1964; 1972 (defeated); 1974	Incumbent re-elected.	▌ ✓ James H. Scheuer (Democratic) 72.3%; ▌Gustave A. Reifenkugel (Republican) 27.7%
New York 9	Thomas J. Manton	Democratic	1984	Incumbent re-elected.	▌ ✓ Thomas J. Manton (Democratic) 64.4%; ▌Ann Pfoser Darby (Republican) 24.4%; ▌Tom Ognibene (Conservative) 11.2%
New York 10	Chuck Schumer	Democratic	1980	Incumbent re-elected.	▌ ✓ Chuck Schumer (Democratic) 80.4%; ▌Patrick J. Kinsella (Republican) 19.6%
New York 11	Edolphus Towns	Democratic	1982	Incumbent re-elected.	▌ ✓ Edolphus Towns (Democratic) 92.9%; ▌Ernest Johnson (Conservative) 4.3%; ▌Lorraine Stevens (New Alliance) 2.8%
New York 12	Major Owens	Democratic	1982	Incumbent re-elected.	▌ ✓ Major Owens (Democratic) 94.9%; ▌Joseph Caesar (Conservative) 2.7%; ▌Mamie Moore (New Alliance) 2.4%
New York 13	Stephen J. Solarz	Democratic	1974	Incumbent re-elected.	▌ ✓ Stephen J. Solarz (Democratic) 80.4%; ▌Edwin Ramos (Republican) 19.6%
New York 14	Susan Molinari	Republican	1990	Incumbent re-elected.	▌ ✓ Susan Molinari (Republican) 60.1%; ▌Anthony J. Pocchia (Democratic) 35.5%; ▌Christine Sacchi (Right to Life) 4.5%
New York 15	Bill Green	Republican	1978	Incumbent re-elected.	▌ ✓ Bill Green (Republican) 61.3%; ▌Frances L. Reiter (Democratic) 38.7%
New York 16	Charles Rangel	Democratic	1970	Incumbent re-elected.	▌ ✓ Charles Rangel (Democratic) 97.2%; ▌Alvaader Frazier (New Alliance) 2.8%
New York 17	Theodore S. Weiss	Democratic	1976	Incumbent re-elected.	▌ ✓ Theodore S. Weiss (Democratic) 80.5%; ▌William Koeppel (Republican) 15.5%; ▌Mark Goret (Conservative) 3.0%; ▌John Patterson (New Alliance) 1.1%
New York 18	José E. Serrano	Democratic	1990	Incumbent re-elected.	▌ ✓ José E. Serrano (Democratic) 93.2%; ▌Joseph Chiavaro (Republican) 2.9%; ▌Mary Rivera (New Alliance) 2.1%; ▌Anna Johnson (Conservative) 1.8%
New York 19	Eliot Engel	Democratic	1988	Incumbent re-elected.	▌ ✓ Eliot Engel (Democratic) 61.2%; ▌William J. Gouldman (Republican) 22.9%; ▌Kevin Brawley (Conservative) 15.9%
New York 20	Nita Lowey	Democratic	1988	Incumbent re-elected.	▌ ✓ Nita Lowey (Democratic) 62.8%; ▌Glenn D. Bellitto (Republican) 27.2%; ▌John M. Schafer (Conservative) 10.0%
New York 21	Hamilton Fish IV	Republican	1968	Incumbent re-elected.	▌ ✓ Hamilton Fish IV (Republican) 71.4%; ▌Richard L. Barbuto (Democratic) 24.4%; ▌Richard S. Curtin (Right to Life) 4.2%
New York 22	Benjamin Gilman	Republican	1972	Incumbent re-elected.	▌ ✓ Benjamin Gilman (Republican) 68.6%; ▌John G. Dow (Democratic) 26.6%; ▌Margaret M. Beirne (Right to Life) 4.8%
New York 23	Michael R. McNulty	Democratic	1988	Incumbent re-elected.	▌ ✓ Michael R. McNulty (Democratic) 64.1%; ▌Margaret B. Buhrmaster (Republican) 35.9%
New York 24	Gerald Solomon	Republican	1978	Incumbent re-elected.	▌ ✓ Gerald Solomon (Republican) 68.1%; ▌Bob Lawrence (Democratic) 31.9%
New York 25	Sherwood Boehlert	Republican	1982	Incumbent re-elected.	▌ ✓ Sherwood Boehlert (Republican) 83.9%; ▌William L. Griffen (Libertarian) 16.1%
New York 26	David O'Brien Martin	Republican	1980	Incumbent re-elected.	▌ ✓ David O'Brien Martin (Republican) 100%
New York 27	James T. Walsh	Republican	1988	Incumbent re-elected.	▌ ✓ James T. Walsh (Republican) 63.2%; ▌Peggy L. Murray (Democratic) 34.8%; ▌Stephen K. Hoff (Right to Life) 2.1%
New York 28	Matthew F. McHugh	Democratic	1974	Incumbent re-elected.	▌ ✓ Matthew F. McHugh (Democratic) 64.8%; ▌Seymour Krieger (Republican) 35.2%
New York 29	Frank Horton	Republican	1962	Incumbent re-elected.	▌ ✓ Frank Horton (Republican) 63.0%; ▌Alton F. Eber (Democratic) 24.6%; ▌Peter DeMauro (Conservative) 8.9%; ▌Donald M. Peters (Right to Life) 3.4%
New York 30	Louise Slaughter	Democratic	1986	Incumbent re-elected.	▌ ✓ Louise Slaughter (Democratic) 59.0%; ▌John M. Regan Jr. (Republican) 41.0%
New York 31	Bill Paxon	Republican	1988	Incumbent re-elected.	▌ ✓ Bill Paxon (Republican) 57.3%; ▌Kevin P. Gaughan (Democratic) 42.7%
New York 32	John J. LaFalce	Democratic	1974	Incumbent re-elected.	▌ ✓ John J. LaFalce (Democratic) 55.0%; ▌Michael T. Waring (Republican) 31.4%; ▌Kenneth J. Kowalski (Conservative) 13.6%
New York 33	Henry J. Nowak	Democratic	1974	Incumbent re-elected.	▌ ✓ Henry J. Nowak (Democratic) 67.5%; ▌Thomas Kepfer (Republican) 14.4%; ▌Louis P. Corrigan Jr. (Conservative) 15.1%
New York 34	Amo Houghton	Republican	1986	Incumbent re-elected.	▌ ✓ Amo Houghton (Republican) 63.4%; ▌Joseph P. Leahey (Republican) 26.4%; ▌Nevin K. Eklund (Libertarian) 1.3%

== North Carolina ==
District	Incumbent			This race	
District	Representative	Party	First elected	Results	Candidates
North Carolina 1	Walter B. Jones Sr.	Democratic	1966	Incumbent re-elected.	▌ ✓ Walter B. Jones Sr. (Democratic) 64.8%; ▌Howard D. Moye (Republican) 35.2%
North Carolina 2	Tim Valentine	Democratic	1982	Incumbent re-elected.	▌ ✓ Tim Valentine (Democratic) 74.7%; ▌Hal C. Sharpe (Republican) 25.3%
North Carolina 3	Martin Lancaster	Democratic	1986	Incumbent re-elected.	▌ ✓ Martin Lancaster (Democratic) 59.3%; ▌Don Davis (Republican) 40.7%
North Carolina 4	David Price	Democratic	1986	Incumbent re-elected.	▌ ✓ David Price (Democratic) 58.1%; ▌John H. Carrington (Republican) 41.9%
North Carolina 5	Stephen L. Neal	Democratic	1974	Incumbent re-elected.	▌ ✓ Stephen L. Neal (Democratic) 59.1%; ▌Kenneth D. Bell (Republican) 40.9%
North Carolina 6	Howard Coble	Republican	1984	Incumbent re-elected.	▌ ✓ Howard Coble (Republican) 66.6%; ▌Helen Allegrone (Democratic) 33.4%
North Carolina 7	Charlie Rose	Democratic	1972	Incumbent re-elected.	▌ ✓ Charlie Rose (Democratic) 65.6%; ▌Robert C. Anderson (Republican) 34.4%
North Carolina 8	Bill Hefner	Democratic	1974	Incumbent re-elected.	▌ ✓ Bill Hefner (Democratic) 55.0%; ▌Ted Blanton (Republican) 45.0%
North Carolina 9	Alex McMillan	Republican	1984	Incumbent re-elected.	▌ ✓ Alex McMillan (Republican) 62.0%; ▌David P. McKnight (Democratic) 38.0%
North Carolina 10	Cass Ballenger	Republican	1986	Incumbent re-elected.	▌ ✓ Cass Ballenger (Republican) 61.8%; ▌Daniel R. Green Jr. (Democratic) 38.2%
North Carolina 11	James M. Clarke	Democratic	1982; 1984 (defeated); 1986	Incumbent lost re-election. Republican gain.	▌ ✓ Charles H. Taylor (Republican) 50.7%; ▌James M. Clarke (Democratic) 49.3%

== North Dakota ==
District	Incumbent			This race	
District	Representative	Party	First elected	Results	Candidates
North Dakota at-large	Byron Dorgan	Democratic-NPL	1980	Incumbent re-elected.	▌ ✓ Byron Dorgan (Democratic-NPL) 65.2%; ▌Ed Schafer (Republican) 34.8%

== Ohio ==
District	Incumbent			This race	
District	Representative	Party	First elected	Results	Candidates
Ohio 1	Tom Luken	Democratic	1974 (special); 1974 (defeated); 1976	Incumbent retired. Democratic hold.	▌ ✓ Charlie Luken (Democratic) 51.1%; ▌Ken Blackwell (Republican) 48.9%
Ohio 2	Bill Gradison	Republican	1974	Incumbent re-elected.	▌ ✓ Bill Gradison (Republican) 64.4%; ▌Tyrone Yates (Democratic) 35.6%
Ohio 3	Tony P. Hall	Democratic	1978	Incumbent re-elected.	▌ ✓ Tony P. Hall (Democratic); Uncontested
Ohio 4	Mike Oxley	Republican	1981	Incumbent re-elected.	▌ ✓ Mike Oxley (Republican) 61.7%; ▌Thomas E. Burkhart (Democratic) 38.3%
Ohio 5	Paul Gillmor	Republican	1988	Incumbent re-elected.	▌ ✓ Paul Gillmor (Republican) 68.5%; ▌P. Scott Mange (Democratic) 25.1%; ▌John E. Jackson (Independent) 6.4%
Ohio 6	Bob McEwen	Republican	1980	Incumbent re-elected.	▌ ✓ Bob McEwen (Republican) 71.2%; ▌Ray Mitchell (Democratic) 28.8%
Ohio 7	Mike DeWine	Republican	1982	Incumbent retired to run for Ohio Lt. Governor. Republican hold.	▌ ✓ Dave Hobson (Republican) 62.1%; ▌Jack Schira (Democratic) 37.9%
Ohio 8	Buz Lukens	Republican	1966; 1970 (retired); 1986	Incumbent lost renomination and later resigned. Republican hold.	▌ ✓ John Boehner (Republican) 61.1%; ▌Gregory V. Jolivette (Democratic) 38.9%
Ohio 9	Marcy Kaptur	Democratic	1982	Incumbent re-elected.	▌ ✓ Marcy Kaptur (Democratic) 77.7%; ▌Jerry D. Lammers (Republican) 22.3%
Ohio 10	Clarence E. Miller	Republican	1966	Incumbent re-elected.	▌ ✓ Clarence E. Miller (Republican) 63.2%; ▌John M. Buchanan (Democratic) 36.8%
Ohio 11	Dennis E. Eckart	Democratic	1980	Incumbent re-elected.	▌ ✓ Dennis E. Eckart (Democratic) 65.7%; ▌Margeret R. Mueller (Republican) 34.3%
Ohio 12	John Kasich	Republican	1982	Incumbent re-elected.	▌ ✓ John Kasich (Republican) 72.0%; ▌Mike Gelpi (Democratic) 28.0%
Ohio 13	Donald J. Pease	Democratic	1976	Incumbent re-elected.	▌ ✓ Donald J. Pease (Democratic) 56.7%; ▌William D. Nielsen (Republican) 37.0%; ▌John Michael Ryan (Independent) 6.4%
Ohio 14	Thomas C. Sawyer	Democratic	1986	Incumbent re-elected.	▌ ✓ Thomas C. Sawyer (Democratic) 59.6%; ▌Jean E. Bender (Republican) 40.4%
Ohio 15	Chalmers Wylie	Republican	1966	Incumbent re-elected.	▌ ✓ Chalmers Wylie (Republican) 59.1%; ▌Thomas V. Erney (Democratic) 40.8%
Ohio 16	Ralph Regula	Republican	1972	Incumbent re-elected.	▌ ✓ Ralph Regula (Republican) 58.9%; ▌Warner D. Mendenhall (Democratic) 41.1%
Ohio 17	James Traficant	Democratic	1984	Incumbent re-elected.	▌ ✓ James Traficant (Democratic) 77.7%; ▌Robert R. DeJulio Jr. (Republican) 22.3%
Ohio 18	Douglas Applegate	Democratic	1976	Incumbent re-elected.	▌ ✓ Douglas Applegate (Democratic) 74.3%; ▌John A. Hales (Republican) 25.7%
Ohio 19	Ed Feighan	Democratic	1982	Incumbent re-elected.	▌ ✓ Ed Feighan (Democratic) 64.7%; ▌Susan M. Lawko (Republican) 35.2%
Ohio 20	Mary Rose Oakar	Democratic	1976	Incumbent re-elected.	▌ ✓ Mary Rose Oakar (Democratic) 73.3%; ▌Bill Smith (Republican) 26.7%
Ohio 21	Louis Stokes	Democratic	1968	Incumbent re-elected.	▌ ✓ Louis Stokes (Democratic) 80.5%; ▌Franklin H. Roski (Republican) 19.5%

== Oklahoma ==
District	Incumbent			This race	
District	Representative	Party	First elected	Results	Candidates
Oklahoma 1	Jim Inhofe	Republican	1986	Incumbent re-elected.	▌ ✓ Jim Inhofe (Republican) 56.0%; ▌Kurt Glassco (Democratic) 44.0%
Oklahoma 2	Mike Synar	Democratic	1978	Incumbent re-elected.	▌ ✓ Mike Synar (Democratic) 61.3%; ▌Terry M. Gorham (Republican) 38.7%
Oklahoma 3	Wes Watkins	Democratic	1976	Incumbent retired to run for Oklahoma Governor. Democratic hold.	▌ ✓ Bill Brewster (Democratic) 80.4%; ▌Patrick K. Miller (Republican) 19.6%
Oklahoma 4	Dave McCurdy	Democratic	1980	Incumbent re-elected.	▌ ✓ Dave McCurdy (Democratic) 73.6%; ▌Howard Bell (Republican) 26.4%
Oklahoma 5	Mickey Edwards	Republican	1976	Incumbent re-elected.	▌ ✓ Mickey Edwards (Republican) 69.6%; ▌Bryce Baggett (Democratic) 30.4%
Oklahoma 6	Glenn English	Democratic	1974	Incumbent re-elected.	▌ ✓ Glenn English (Democratic) 80.0%; ▌Robert Burns (Republican) 20.0%

== Oregon ==
District	Incumbent			This race	
District	Representative	Party	First elected	Results	Candidates
Oregon 1	Les AuCoin	Democratic	1974	Incumbent re-elected.	▌ ✓ Les AuCoin (Democratic) 63.1%; ▌Earl Molander (Republican) 30.4%; ▌Rick Livingston (Independent) 6.5%
Oregon 2	Bob Smith	Republican	1982	Incumbent re-elected.	▌ ✓ Bob Smith (Republican) 68.0%; ▌Jim Smiley (Democratic) 32.0%
Oregon 3	Ron Wyden	Democratic	1980	Incumbent re-elected.	▌ ✓ Ron Wyden (Democratic) 80.8%; ▌Phil Mooney (Republican) 19.1%
Oregon 4	Peter DeFazio	Democratic	1986	Incumbent re-elected.	▌ ✓ Peter DeFazio (Democratic) 85.8%; ▌Tonie Nathan (Libertarian) 14.0%
Oregon 5	Denny Smith	Republican	1980	Incumbent lost re-election. Democratic gain.	▌ ✓ Michael J. Kopetski (Democratic) 55.0%; ▌Denny Smith (Republican) 44.9%

== Pennsylvania ==
District	Incumbent			This race	
District	Representative	Party	First elected	Results	Candidates
Pennsylvania 1	Thomas M. Foglietta	Democratic	1980	Incumbent re-elected.	▌ ✓ Thomas M. Foglietta (Democratic) 79.4%; ▌James Love Jackson (Republican) 20.6%
Pennsylvania 2	William H. Gray III	Democratic	1978	Incumbent re-elected.	▌ ✓ William H. Gray III (Democratic) 92.1%; ▌Donald Bakove (Republican) 7.9%
Pennsylvania 3	Robert Borski	Democratic	1982	Incumbent re-elected.	▌ ✓ Robert Borski (Democratic) 60.0%; ▌Joseph M. McColgan (Republican) 40.0%
Pennsylvania 4	Joseph P. Kolter	Democratic	1982	Incumbent re-elected.	▌ ✓ Joseph P. Kolter (Democratic) 55.9%; ▌Gordon R. Johnston (Republican) 44.1%
Pennsylvania 5	Richard T. Schulze	Republican	1974	Incumbent re-elected.	▌ ✓ Richard T. Schulze (Republican) 57.1%; ▌Samuel C. Stretton (Democratic) 38.5%; ▌Lewis duPont Smith (Independent) 4.4%
Pennsylvania 6	Gus Yatron	Democratic	1968	Incumbent re-elected.	▌ ✓ Gus Yatron (Democratic) 57.0%; ▌John F. Hicks (Republican) 43.0%
Pennsylvania 7	Curt Weldon	Republican	1986	Incumbent re-elected.	▌ ✓ Curt Weldon (Republican) 65.3%; ▌John F. Innelli (Democratic) 34.7%
Pennsylvania 8	Peter H. Kostmayer	Democratic	1976; 1980 (defeated); 1982	Incumbent re-elected.	▌ ✓ Peter H. Kostmayer (Democratic) 56.6%; ▌Audrie Zettick Schaller (Republican) 43.4%
Pennsylvania 9	Bud Shuster	Republican	1972	Incumbent re-elected.	▌ ✓ Bud Shuster (Republican) 100%
Pennsylvania 10	Joseph M. McDade	Republican	1962	Incumbent re-elected.	▌ ✓ Joseph M. McDade (Republican) 100%
Pennsylvania 11	Paul Kanjorski	Democratic	1984	Incumbent re-elected.	▌ ✓ Paul Kanjorski (Democratic) 100%
Pennsylvania 12	John Murtha	Democratic	1974	Incumbent re-elected.	▌ ✓ John Murtha (Democratic) 61.7%; ▌Bill Choby (Republican) 38.3%
Pennsylvania 13	Lawrence Coughlin	Republican	1968	Incumbent re-elected.	▌ ✓ Lawrence Coughlin (Republican) 60.3%; ▌Bernard Tomkin (Democratic) 39.7%
Pennsylvania 14	William J. Coyne	Democratic	1980	Incumbent re-elected.	▌ ✓ William J. Coyne (Democratic) 71.8%; ▌Richard E. Caligiuri (Republican) 28.2%
Pennsylvania 15	Donald L. Ritter	Republican	1978	Incumbent re-elected.	▌ ✓ Donald L. Ritter (Republican) 60.6%; ▌Richard J. Orloski (Democratic) 39.4%
Pennsylvania 16	Bob Walker	Republican	1976	Incumbent re-elected.	▌ ✓ Bob Walker (Republican) 66.1%; ▌Ernest Eric Guyll (Democratic) 33.9%
Pennsylvania 17	George Gekas	Republican	1982	Incumbent re-elected.	▌ ✓ George Gekas (Republican) 100%
Pennsylvania 18	Doug Walgren	Democratic	1976	Incumbent lost re-election. Republican gain.	▌ ✓ Rick Santorum (Republican) 51.4%; ▌Doug Walgren (Democratic) 48.6%
Pennsylvania 19	Bill Goodling	Republican	1974	Incumbent re-elected.	▌ ✓ Bill Goodling (Republican) 100%
Pennsylvania 20	Joseph M. Gaydos	Democratic	1968	Incumbent re-elected.	▌ ✓ Joseph M. Gaydos (Democratic) 65.6%; ▌Robert C. Lee (Republican) 34.4%
Pennsylvania 21	Tom Ridge	Republican	1982	Incumbent re-elected.	▌ ✓ Tom Ridge (Republican) 100%
Pennsylvania 22	Austin Murphy	Democratic	1976	Incumbent re-elected.	▌ ✓ Austin Murphy (Democratic) 63.3%; ▌Suzanne Hayden (Republican) 36.7%
Pennsylvania 23	William Clinger	Republican	1978	Incumbent re-elected.	▌ ✓ William Clinger (Republican) 59.4%; ▌Daniel J. Shannon (Democratic) 40.6%

== Rhode Island ==
District	Incumbent			This race	
District	Representative	Party	First elected	Results	Candidates
Rhode Island 1	Ronald Machtley	Republican	1988	Incumbent re-elected.	▌ ✓ Ronald Machtley (Republican) 55.2%; ▌J. Scott Wolf (Democratic) 44.8%
Rhode Island 2	Claudine Schneider	Republican	1980	Incumbent retired to run for U.S. Senator. Democratic gain.	▌ ✓ Jack Reed (Democratic) 59.2%; ▌Trudy Coxe (Republican) 40.8%

== South Carolina ==
District	Incumbent			This race	
District	Representative	Party	First elected	Results	Candidates
South Carolina 1	Arthur Ravenel Jr.	Republican	1986	Incumbent re-elected.	▌ ✓ Arthur Ravenel Jr. (Republican) 65.5%; ▌Eugene Platt (Democratic) 34.5%
South Carolina 2	Floyd Spence	Republican	1970	Incumbent re-elected.	▌ ✓ Floyd Spence (Republican) 88.7%; ▌ Geb Sommer (Libertarian) 10.9%
South Carolina 3	Butler Derrick	Democratic	1974	Incumbent re-elected.	▌ ✓ Butler Derrick (Democratic) 58.0%; ▌Ray Haskett (Republican) 41.9%
South Carolina 4	Liz J. Patterson	Democratic	1986	Incumbent re-elected.	▌ ✓ Liz J. Patterson (Democratic) 61.4%; ▌Terry Haskins (Republican) 38.4%
South Carolina 5	John Spratt	Democratic	1982	Incumbent re-elected.	▌ ✓ John Spratt (Democratic) 99.9%
South Carolina 6	Robin Tallon	Democratic	1982	Incumbent re-elected.	▌ ✓ Robin Tallon (Democratic) 99.6%

== South Dakota ==
District	Incumbent			This race	
District	Representative	Party	First elected	Results	Candidates
South Dakota at-large	Tim Johnson	Democratic	1986	Incumbent re-elected.	▌ ✓ Tim Johnson (Democratic) 67.6%; ▌Don Frankenfeld (Republican) 32.4%

== Tennessee ==
District	Incumbent			This race	
District	Representative	Party	First elected	Results	Candidates
Tennessee 1	Jimmy Quillen	Republican	1962	Incumbent re-elected.	▌ ✓ Jimmy Quillen (Republican) 99.9%
Tennessee 2	Jimmy Duncan	Republican	1988	Incumbent re-elected.	▌ ✓ Jimmy Duncan (Republican) 80.6%; ▌Peter Hebert (Independent) 19.4%
Tennessee 3	Marilyn Lloyd	Democratic	1974	Incumbent re-elected.	▌ ✓ Marilyn Lloyd (Democratic) 53.0%; ▌Grady L. Rhoden (Republican) 39.3%; ▌Peter T. Melcher (Independent) 6.0%; ▌George E. Googe (Independent) 1.7%
Tennessee 4	Jim Cooper	Democratic	1982	Incumbent re-elected.	▌ ✓ Jim Cooper (Democratic) 67.4%; ▌Claiborne Sanders (Republican) 29.6%; ▌Gene M. Bullington (Independent) 3.0%
Tennessee 5	Bob Clement	Democratic	1988	Incumbent re-elected.	▌ ✓ Bob Clement (Democratic) 72.4%; ▌Tom Stone (Independent) 17.7%; ▌Al Borgman (Independent) 7.0%; ▌Maurice Kuttab (Independent) 2.9%
Tennessee 6	Bart Gordon	Democratic	1984	Incumbent re-elected.	▌ ✓ Bart Gordon (Democratic) 66.7%; ▌Gregory Cochran (Republican) 29.1%; ▌Ken Brown (Independent) 4.2%
Tennessee 7	Don Sundquist	Republican	1982	Incumbent re-elected.	▌ ✓ Don Sundquist (Republican) 62.0%; ▌Ken Bloodworth (Democratic) 38.0%
Tennessee 8	John S. Tanner	Democratic	1988	Incumbent re-elected.	▌ ✓ John S. Tanner (Democratic); Uncontested
Tennessee 9	Harold Ford Sr.	Democratic	1974	Incumbent re-elected.	▌ ✓ Harold Ford Sr. (Democratic) 58.1%; ▌Aaron C. Davis (Republican) 30.8%; ▌Thomas M. Davidson (Independent) 8.7%; ▌Isaac Richmond (Independent) 2.4%

== Texas ==
District	Incumbent			This race	
District	Representative	Party	First elected	Results	Candidates
Texas 1	Jim Chapman	Democratic	1985	Incumbent re-elected.	▌ ✓ Jim Chapman (Democratic) 61.0%; ▌Hamp Hodges (Republican) 39.0%
Texas 2	Charles Wilson	Democratic	1972	Incumbent re-elected.	▌ ✓ Charles Wilson (Democratic) 55.6%; ▌Donna Peterson (Republican) 44.4%
Texas 3	Steve Bartlett	Republican	1982	Incumbent re-elected.	▌ ✓ Steve Bartlett (Republican) 99.6%; ▌Noel Kopala (Write-in) 0.4%
Texas 4	Ralph Hall	Democratic	1980	Incumbent re-elected.	▌ ✓ Ralph Hall (Democratic) 99.6%; ▌Tim J. McCord (Write-in) 0.4%
Texas 5	John Wiley Bryant	Democratic	1982	Incumbent re-elected.	▌ ✓ John Wiley Bryant (Democratic) 59.6%; ▌Jerry Rucker (Republican) 37.7%; ▌Ken Ashby (Libertarian) 2.7%
Texas 6	Joe Barton	Republican	1984	Incumbent re-elected.	▌ ✓ Joe Barton (Republican) 66.5%; ▌John E. Welch (Democratic) 33.1%; ▌Michael Worsham (Write-in) 0.4%
Texas 7	Bill Archer	Republican	1970	Incumbent re-elected.	▌ ✓ Bill Archer (Republican) 100%
Texas 8	Jack Fields	Republican	1980	Incumbent re-elected.	▌ ✓ Jack Fields (Republican) 100%
Texas 9	Jack Brooks	Democratic	1952	Incumbent re-elected.	▌ ✓ Jack Brooks (Democratic) 57.7%; ▌Maury Meyers (Republican) 42.3%
Texas 10	J. J. Pickle	Democratic	1963	Incumbent re-elected.	▌ ✓ J. J. Pickle (Democratic) 64.9%; ▌David Beilharz (Republican) 34.3%; ▌Jeff Davis (Libertarian) 3.8%
Texas 11	Marvin Leath	Democratic	1978	Incumbent retired. Democratic hold.	▌ ✓ Chet Edwards (Democratic) 53.5%; ▌Hugh Shine (Republican) 46.5%
Texas 12	Pete Geren	Democratic	1989	Incumbent re-elected.	▌ ✓ Pete Geren (Democratic) 71.3%; ▌Mike McGinn (Republican) 28.7%
Texas 13	Bill Sarpalius	Democratic	1988	Incumbent re-elected.	▌ ✓ Bill Sarpalius (Democratic) 56.5%; ▌Richard A. Waterfield (Republican) 43.5%
Texas 14	Greg Laughlin	Democratic	1988	Incumbent re-elected.	▌ ✓ Greg Laughlin (Democratic) 54.3%; ▌Joe Dial (Republican) 45.7%
Texas 15	Kika de la Garza	Democratic	1964	Incumbent re-elected.	▌ ✓ Kika de la Garza (Democratic) 100%
Texas 16	Ronald D. Coleman	Democratic	1982	Incumbent re-elected.	▌ ✓ Ronald D. Coleman (Democratic) 96.0%; ▌William Burgett (Write-in) 4.0%
Texas 17	Charles Stenholm	Democratic	1978	Incumbent re-elected.	▌ ✓ Charles Stenholm (Democratic) 100%
Texas 18	Craig Washington	Democratic	1989	Incumbent re-elected.	▌ ✓ Craig Washington (Democratic) 99.6%
Texas 19	Larry Combest	Republican	1984	Incumbent re-elected.	▌ ✓ Larry Combest (Republican) 100%
Texas 20	Henry B. González	Democratic	1960	Incumbent re-elected.	▌ ✓ Henry B. González (Democratic) 100%
Texas 21	Lamar Smith	Republican	1986	Incumbent re-elected.	▌ ✓ Lamar Smith (Republican) 74.8%; ▌Kirby J. Roberts (Democratic) 25.2%
Texas 22	Tom DeLay	Republican	1984	Incumbent re-elected.	▌ ✓ Tom DeLay (Republican) 71.2%; ▌Bruce Director (Democratic) 28.8%
Texas 23	Albert Bustamante	Democratic	1984	Incumbent re-elected.	▌ ✓ Albert Bustamante (Democratic) 63.5%; ▌Jerome L. Gonzalez (Republican) 36.5%
Texas 24	Martin Frost	Democratic	1978	Incumbent re-elected.	▌ ✓ Martin Frost (Democratic) 100%
Texas 25	Michael A. Andrews	Democratic	1982	Incumbent re-elected.	▌ ✓ Michael A. Andrews (Democratic) 100%
Texas 26	Dick Armey	Republican	1984	Incumbent re-elected.	▌ ✓ Dick Armey (Republican) 70.4%; ▌John Wayne Caton (Democratic) 29.6%
Texas 27	Solomon Ortiz	Democratic	1982	Incumbent re-elected.	▌ ✓ Solomon Ortiz (Democratic) 100%

== Utah ==
District	Incumbent			This race	
District	Representative	Party	First elected	Results	Candidates
Utah 1	Jim Hansen	Republican	1980	Incumbent re-elected.	▌ ✓ Jim Hansen (Republican) 52.2%; ▌Kenley W. Brunsdale (Democratic) 43.8%; ▌Reva Marx Wadsworth (American) 4.1%
Utah 2	Wayne Owens	Democratic	1972; 1974 (retired); 1986	Incumbent re-elected.	▌ ✓ Wayne Owens (Democratic) 57.6%; ▌Genevieve Atwood (Republican) 39.8%; ▌Lawrence Rey Topham (Independent) 2.3%; ▌Eleanor Garcia (Socialist Workers) 0.3%
Utah 3	Howard C. Nielson	Republican	1982	Incumbent retired. Democratic gain.	▌ ✓ Bill Orton (Democratic) 58.3%; ▌Karl Snow (Republican) 36.4%; ▌Robert J. Smith (American) 4.8%; ▌Anthony Dutrow (Socialist Workers) 0.4%

== Vermont ==
District	Incumbent			This race	
District	Representative	Party	First elected	Result	Candidates
Vermont at-large	Peter Plympton Smith	Republican	1988	Incumbent lost re-election. Independent gain.	▌ ✓ Bernie Sanders (Independent) 56.0%; ▌Peter Plympton Smith (Republican) 39.5%; ▌Dolores Sandoval (Democratic) 3.0%; ▌Peter Diamondstone (Liberty Union) 0.9%

== Virginia ==
District	Incumbent			This race	
District	Representative	Party	First elected	Results	Candidates
Virginia 1	Herbert H. Bateman	Republican	1982	Incumbent re-elected.	▌ ✓ Herbert H. Bateman (Republican) 51.0%; ▌Andrew H. Fox (Democratic) 49.0%
Virginia 2	Owen B. Pickett	Democratic	1986	Incumbent re-elected.	▌ ✓ Owen B. Pickett (Democratic) 75.0%; ▌Harry G. Broskie (Independent) 21.6%
Virginia 3	Thomas J. Bliley Jr.	Republican	1980	Incumbent re-elected.	▌ ✓ Thomas J. Bliley Jr. (Republican) 65.3%; ▌Jay Starke (Democratic) 30.7%; ▌Rose L. Simpson (Independent) 3.7%
Virginia 4	Norman Sisisky	Democratic	1982	Incumbent re-elected.	▌ ✓ Norman Sisisky (Democratic) 78.3%; ▌Don L. McReynolds (Independent) 13.6%; ▌Loretta Chandler (Independent) 7.8%
Virginia 5	Lewis F. Payne Jr.	Democratic	1988	Incumbent re-elected.	▌ ✓ Lewis F. Payne Jr. (Democratic) 99.4%
Virginia 6	Jim Olin	Democratic	1982	Incumbent re-elected.	▌ ✓ Jim Olin (Democratic) 82.7%; ▌Gerald E. Berg (Independent) 16.1%
Virginia 7	D. French Slaughter Jr.	Republican	1984	Incumbent re-elected.	▌ ✓ D. French Slaughter Jr. (Republican) 58.1%; ▌David M. Smith (Democratic) 41.7%
Virginia 8	Stanford Parris	Republican	1972; 1974 (defeated); 1980	Incumbent lost re-election. Democratic gain.	▌ ✓ Jim Moran (Democratic) 51.7%; ▌Stanford Parris (Republican) 44.6%; ▌Robert T. Murphy (Independent) 3.5%
Virginia 9	Rick Boucher	Democratic	1982	Incumbent re-elected.	▌ ✓ Rick Boucher (Democratic) 97.1%
Virginia 10	Frank Wolf	Republican	1980	Incumbent re-elected.	▌ ✓ Frank Wolf (Republican) 61.5%; ▌N. MacKenzie Canter III (Democratic) 33.9%; ▌Barbara S. Minnich (Independent) 3.1%; ▌Lyndon LaRouche (Independent) 1.3%

== Washington ==
District	Incumbent			This race	
District	Representative	Party	First elected	Results	Candidates
Washington 1	John Miller	Republican	1984	Incumbent re-elected.	▌ ✓ John Miller (Republican) 52.0%; ▌Cynthia Sullivan (Democratic) 48.0%
Washington 2	Al Swift	Democratic	1978	Incumbent re-elected.	▌ ✓ Al Swift (Democratic) 50.5%; ▌Doug Smith (Republican) 41.2%; ▌William L. McCord (Libertarian) 8.3%
Washington 3	Jolene Unsoeld	Democratic	1988	Incumbent re-elected.	▌ ✓ Jolene Unsoeld (Democratic) 53.8%; ▌Robert Williams (Republican) 46.2%
Washington 4	Sid Morrison	Republican	1980	Incumbent re-elected.	▌ ✓ Sid Morrison (Republican) 70.7%; ▌Ole H. Hougen (Democratic) 29.3%
Washington 5	Tom Foley	Democratic	1964	Incumbent re-elected.	▌ ✓ Tom Foley (Democratic) 68.8%; ▌Marlyn Derby (Republican) 31.2%
Washington 6	Norm Dicks	Democratic	1976	Incumbent re-elected.	▌ ✓ Norm Dicks (Democratic) 61.4%; ▌Norman Mueller (Republican) 38.6%
Washington 7	Jim McDermott	Democratic	1988	Incumbent re-elected.	▌ ✓ Jim McDermott (Democratic) 72.3%; ▌Larry Penberthy (Republican) 24.1%; ▌Robbie Scherr (Socialist Workers) 3.6%
Washington 8	Rod Chandler	Republican	1982	Incumbent re-elected.	▌ ✓ Rod Chandler (Republican) 56.2%; ▌David Giles (Democratic) 43.8%

== West Virginia ==
District	Incumbent			This race	
District	Representative	Party	First elected	Results	Candidates
West Virginia 1	Alan Mollohan	Democratic	1982	Incumbent re-elected.	▌ ✓ Alan Mollohan (Democratic) 67.1%; ▌Howard K. Tuck (Republican) 32.9%
West Virginia 2	Harley O. Staggers Jr.	Democratic	1982	Incumbent re-elected.	▌ ✓ Harley O. Staggers Jr. (Democratic) 55.5%; ▌Oliver Luck (Republican) 44.5%
West Virginia 3	Bob Wise	Democratic	1982	Incumbent re-elected.	▌ ✓ Bob Wise (Democratic) 100%
West Virginia 4	Nick Rahall	Democratic	1976	Incumbent re-elected.	▌ ✓ Nick Rahall (Democratic) 52.0%; ▌Marianne R. Brewster (Republican) 48.0%

== Wisconsin ==
District	Incumbent			This race	
District	Representative	Party	First elected	Results	Candidates
Wisconsin 1	Les Aspin	Democratic	1970	Incumbent re-elected.	▌ ✓ Les Aspin (Democratic) 99.4%
Wisconsin 2	Robert Kastenmeier	Democratic	1958	Incumbent lost re-election. Republican gain.	▌ ✓ Scott Klug (Republican) 53.2%; ▌Robert Kastenmeier (Democratic) 46.8%
Wisconsin 3	Steve Gunderson	Republican	1980	Incumbent re-elected.	▌ ✓ Steve Gunderson (Republican) 61.0%; ▌James Ziegeweid (Democratic) 39.0%
Wisconsin 4	Jerry Kleczka	Democratic	1984	Incumbent re-elected.	▌ ✓ Jerry Kleczka (Democratic) 69.2%; ▌Joseph Cook (Republican) 30.7%
Wisconsin 5	Jim Moody	Democratic	1982	Incumbent re-elected.	▌ ✓ Jim Moody (Democratic) 68.0%; ▌Donalda A. Hammersmith (Republican) 27.4%; ▌Nathaniel Stampley (Independent) 4.4%
Wisconsin 6	Tom Petri	Republican	1979 (special)	Incumbent re-elected.	▌ ✓ Tom Petri (Republican) 99.5%
Wisconsin 7	Dave Obey	Democratic	1969 (special)	Incumbent re-elected.	▌ ✓ Dave Obey (Democratic) 62.1%; ▌John L. McEwen (Republican) 37.9%
Wisconsin 8	Toby Roth	Republican	1978	Incumbent re-elected.	▌ ✓ Toby Roth (Republican) 53.5%; ▌Jerome Van Sistine (Democratic) 46.4%
Wisconsin 9	Jim Sensenbrenner	Republican	1978	Incumbent re-elected.	▌ ✓ Jim Sensenbrenner (Republican) 99.7%

== Wyoming ==
District	Incumbent			This race	
District	Representative	Party	First elected	Results	Candidates
Wyoming at-large	Craig L. Thomas	Republican	1989	Incumbent re-elected.	▌ ✓ Craig L. Thomas (Republican) 55.1%; ▌Pete Maxfield (Democratic) 44.9%

== Non-voting delegates ==
District	Incumbent			This race	
District	Representative	Party	First elected	Results	Candidates
American Samoa	Eni Faleomavaega	Democratic	1988	Incumbent re-elected.	▌ ✓ Eni Faleomavaega (Democratic) 54.8%; ▌Ace A. Tago (Independent) 23.3%; ▌Afoa Moega Lutu (Democratic) 17.5%; ▌Moaaliitele Tuufuli (Democratic) 4.4%
District of Columbia	Walter Fauntroy	Democratic	1970	Incumbent retired to run for mayor. Democratic hold.	▌ ✓ Eleanor Holmes Norton (Democratic) 61.7%; ▌Harry M. Singleton (Republican) 26.3%; ▌George X. Cure (Independent) 5.1%; ▌Leon Frederick Hunt (D.C. Statehood) 2.5%; ▌David H. Dabney (Independent) 2.1%
Guam	Vicente T. Blaz	Republican	1984	Incumbent re-elected.	▌ ✓ Vicente T. Blaz (Republican) 55.1%; ▌Vincente C. Pangelinan (Democratic) 42.4%
U.S. Virgin Islands	Ron de Lugo	Democratic	1980	Incumbent re-elected.	▌ ✓ Ron de Lugo (Democratic) 98.6%

== See also ==
- 1990 United States elections
  - 1990 United States gubernatorial elections
  - 1990 United States Senate elections
- 101st United States Congress
- 102nd United States Congress

== Works cited ==
- Abramson, Paul; Aldrich, John; Rohde, David (1995). Change and Continuity in the 1992 Elections. CQ Press. ISBN 0871878399.
