= 1992 United States House of Representatives elections in Tennessee =

- November 3, 1992

All 9 Tennessee seats to the United States House of Representatives
	Majority party	Minority party
Party	Democratic	Republican
Last election	6	3
Seats won	6	3
Seat change	Steady	Steady
Popular vote	882,973	737,690
Percentage	51.17%	42.75%
Swing	▼0.34%	▲2.49%

Democratic hold
Republican hold
Democratic
40–50%
50–60%
60–70%
70–80%
80–90%
90–100%
Republican
40–50%
50–60%
60–70%
70–80%

The 1992 congressional elections in Tennessee was held on November 3, 1992, to determine who will represent the state of Tennessee in the United States House of Representatives.

Following the 1992 elections, no seats changed hands, leaving the Tennessee delegation at a 6-3 Democratic majority.

== Overview ==
United States House of Representatives elections in Tennessee, 1992
Party	Votes	Percentage	Seats	+/–
Democratic	882,973	51.17%	6	—
Republican	737,690	42.75%	3	—
Independents	104,921	6.08%	0	—
Write-ins	90	0.01%	0	—
Totals	1,725,674	100.00%	9	—

Popular vote
Democratic	51.17%
Republican	42.17%
Other	6.09%

House seats
Democratic	66.67%
Republican	33.33%

=== By district ===
District	Incumbent			This race	
District	Member	Party	First elected	Results	Candidates
Tennessee 1	Jimmy Quillen	Republican	1962	Incumbent re-elected.	▌ ✓ Jimmy Quillen (Republican) 67.5%; ▌Jack Christian (Democratic) 28.1%; ▌Don Fox (Independent) 2.4%; ▌Fred A. Hartley (Independent) 2.0%
Tennessee 2	Jimmy Duncan	Republican	1988	Incumbent re-elected.	▌ ✓ Jimmy Duncan (Republican) 72.2%; ▌Troy Goodale (Democratic) 25.7%; ▌Randon J. Krieg (Independent) 2.1%
Tennessee 3	Marilyn Lloyd	Democratic	1974	Incumbent re-elected.	▌ ✓ Marilyn Lloyd (Democratic) 48.8%; ▌Zach Wamp (Republican) 47.5%; ▌Carol Hagan (Independent) 2.1%; Others: ▌Pete Melcher (Independent) 0.9%; ▌Marjorie M. Martin (Independent) 0.7%
Tennessee 4	Jim Cooper	Democratic	1982	Incumbent re-elected.	▌ ✓ Jim Cooper (Democratic) 64.1%; ▌Dale Johnson (Republican) 32.6%; ▌Ginnia C. Fox (Independent) 2.6%; ▌Kieven Parks (Independent) 0.8%
Tennessee 5	Bob Clement	Democratic	1988	Incumbent re-elected.	▌ ✓ Bob Clement (Democratic) 66.8%; ▌Tom Stone (Republican) 26.3%; ▌Steven L. Edmondson (Independent) 3.6%; ▌Richard H. Wyatt (Independent) 1.9%; Others: ▌John D. Haury (Independent) 0.9%; ▌Ben Tomeo (Independent) 0.5%
Tennessee 6	Bart Gordon	Democratic	1984	Incumbent re-elected.	▌ ✓ Bart Gordon (Democratic) 56.6%; ▌Marsha Blackburn (Republican) 40.6%; ▌H. Scott Benson (Independent) 2.8%
Tennessee 7	Don Sundquist	Republican	1982	Incumbent re-elected.	▌ ✓ Don Sundquist (Republican) 61.7%; ▌David R. Davis (Democratic) 35.5%; ▌Rickey Boyette (Independent) 1.1%; Others: ▌Jim Osburn (Independent) 0.9%; ▌Francis Frederick Tapp (Independent) 0.8%
Tennessee 8	John Tanner	Democratic	1988	Incumbent re-elected.	▌ ✓ John Tanner (Democratic) 83.7%; ▌Lawrence J. Barnes (Independent) 5.9%; ▌David L. Ward (Independent) 4.2%; ▌John E. Vinson (Independent) 3.3%; ▌Millard J. McKissack (Independent) 2.8%
Tennessee 9	Harold Ford Sr.	Democratic	1982	Incumbent re-elected.	▌ ✓ Harold Ford Sr. (Democratic) 57.9%; ▌Charles L. Black (Republican) 28.5%; ▌Richard Liptock (Independent) 6.6%; ▌James Vandergriff (Independent) 5.8%; ▌William Rolen (Independent) 1.2%

== District 1 ==
Tennessee's 1st congressional district election, 1992
Party	Candidate	Votes	%
Republican	Jimmy Quillen (inc.)	114,797	67.46%
Democratic	Jack Christian	47,809	28.10%
Independent	Don Fox	4,126	2.42%
Independent	Fred A. Hartley	3,416	2.01%
Write-In	Write-ins	10	0.01%
Total votes		170,158	100.00%
Republican hold			

== District 2 ==
Tennessee's 2nd congressional district election, 1992
Party	Candidate	Votes	%
Republican	Jimmy Duncan (inc.)	148,377	72.24%
Democratic	Troy Goodale	52,887	25.75%
Independent	Randon J. Krieg	4,134	2.01%
Write-In	Write-ins	3	0.00%
Total votes		205,401	100.00%
Republican hold			

== District 3 ==
1992 Tennessee's 3rd congressional district election
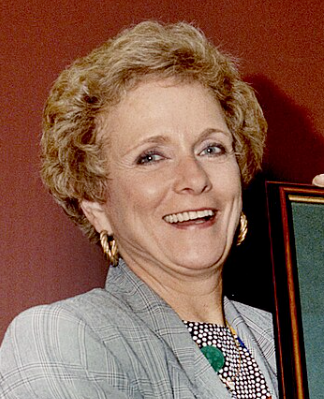

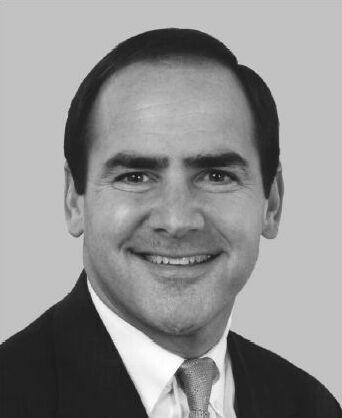
Nominee	Marilyn Lloyd	Zach Wamp
Party	Democratic	Republican
Popular vote	105,693	102,763
Percentage	48.81%	47.46%
- County results Lloyd : 40–50% 50–60% 60–70% 60–70% Wamp: 50–60%
U.S. Representative before election
Marilyn Lloyd
Democratic
Elected U.S. Representative
Zach Wamp
Republican

Tennessee’s 3rd congressional district lied in East Tennessee, anchored by Chattanooga and surrounding communities. It included all of Anderson, Bledsoe, Grundy, Hamilton, Marion, Meigs, Morgan, Polk, Roane, Sequatchie, and Van Buren counties, as well as part of Bradley County. The district had been represented by Democrat Marilyn Lloyd, who had served since 1975.

Marilyn Lloyd performed best in a number of the district’s smaller and more rural counties. She won Grundy, Marion, Meigs, Morgan, Polk, Roane, Sequatchie, Van Buren, and Anderson County.

Republican Zach Wamp’s strength was concentrated in the district’s population centers and most suburban areas. He posted his largest raw vote and margin in Hamilton County, home to Chattanooga, and also carried Bradley County and Bledsoe County. Despite those wins, Wamp’s margins were not large enough to overcome Lloyd’s advantage in the district’s rural and exurban areas.

=== Democratic primary ===
Democratic primary results
Party	Candidate	Votes	%
Democratic	Marilyn Lloyd (incumbent)	29,895	81.08%
Democratic	David Stacy	6,974	18.92%
Total votes		36,869	100.00%

=== Republican primary ===
Republican primary results
Party	Candidate	Votes	%
Republican	Zach Wamp	18,506	77.23%
Republican	Todd Gardenhire	2,792	11.65%
Republican	Wayne Watson	2,665	11.12%
Total votes		23,963	100.00%

=== Results ===
Tennessee's 3rd congressional district election, 1992
Party	Candidate	Votes	%
Democratic	Marilyn Lloyd (inc.)	105,693	48.81%
Republican	Zach Wamp	102,763	47.46%
Independent	Carol Hagan	4,433	2.05%
Independent	Pete Melcher	2,048	0.95%
Independent	Marjorie M. Martin	1,593	0.74%
Write-In	Write-ins	3	0.00%
Total votes		216,533	100.00%
Democratic hold			

== District 4 ==
Tennessee's 4th congressional district election, 1992
Party	Candidate	Votes	%
Democratic	Jim Cooper (inc.)	98,984	64.06%
Republican	Dale Johnson	50,340	32.58%
Independent	Ginnia C. Fox	3,970	2.57%
Independent	Kieven Parks	1,210	0.78%
Write-In	Write-ins	7	0.00%
Total votes		154,511	100.00%
Democratic hold			

== District 5 ==
Tennessee's 5th congressional district election, 1992
Party	Candidate	Votes	%
Democratic	Bob Clement (inc.)	125,233	66.76%
Republican	Tom Stone	49,417	26.34%
Independent	Steven L. Edmondson	6,724	3.58%
Independent	Richard H. Wyatt	3,507	1.87%
Independent	John D. Haury	1,685	0.90%
Independent	Ben Tomeo	1,002	0.53%
Write-In	Write-ins	22	0.01%
Total votes		187,590	100.00%
Democratic hold			

== District 6 ==
1992 Tennessee's 6th congressional district election
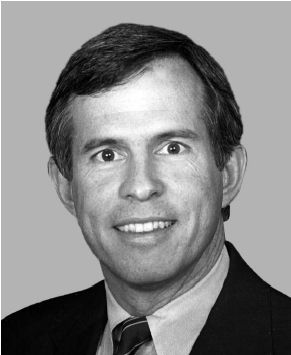

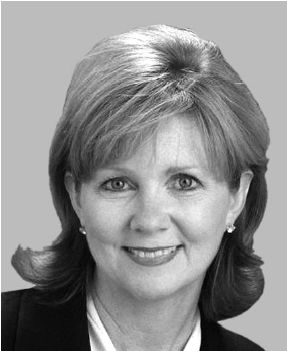
Nominee	Bart Gordon	Marsha Blackburn
Party	Democratic	Republican
Popular vote	120,177	86,289
Percentage	56.57%	40.62%
- County results Gordon: 50–60% 60–70% 70–80% 80–90% Blackburn: 50–60%
U.S. Representative before election
Bart Gordon
Democratic
Elected U.S. Representative
Bart Gordon
Democratic

Tennessee’s 6th congressional district lied in Middle Tennessee, including all of Cannon, Clay, DeKalb, Jackson, Macon, Marshall, Overton, Putnam, Rutherford, Smith, Sumner, Trousdale, Wilson, and Williamson Counties, as well as a small southern portion of Davidson County. It had been represented by Democrat Bart Gordon since 1985.

Bart Gordon won every rural county in the district and ran up particularly large margins in the Upper Cumberland, including Clay, DeKalb, Jackson, Overton, Smith, and Trousdale. He also carried Cannon, Macon, Marshall, Putnam, Rutherford, and Sumner.

The Republican challenger was Marsha Blackburn, who would later become a future Congresswoman representing Tennessee's 7th congressional district. She performed best in the district’s suburban areas, and won the Williamson County–which was her home county–and also carried the suburban precincts in the district’s share of Davidson County. Those margins, however, did not come close to Gordon’s strength in the district’s rural and exurban areas.

=== Democratic primary ===
Democratic primary results
Party	Candidate	Votes	%
Democratic	Bart Gordon	45,576	83.07%
Democratic	Bob Ries	4,912	8.95%
Democratic	Don Schneller	4,371	7.97%
Democratic	Other	7	0.01%
Total votes		54,866	100.00%

=== Republican primary ===
Republican primary results
Party	Candidate	Votes	%
Republican	Marsha Blackburn	8,471	50.65%
Republican	Jeff Whitesides	3,964	23.70%
Republican	Robert Baker	1,794	10.73%
Republican	Porter Stark	883	5.28%
Republican	Gregory Cochran	677	4.05%
Republican	William Rainey	468	2.80%
Republican	David Schwab	460	2.75%
Republican	Other	6	0.04%
Total votes		16,723	100.00%

=== Results ===
Tennessee's 6th congressional district election, 1992
Party	Candidate	Votes	%
Democratic	Bart Gordon (inc.)	120,177	56.57%
Republican	Marsha Blackburn	86,289	40.62%
Independent	H. Scott Benson	5,952	2.80%
Write-In	Write-ins	10	0.00%
Total votes		212,428	100.00%
Democratic hold			

== District 7 ==
Tennessee's 7th congressional district election, 1992
Party	Candidate	Votes	%
Republican	Don Sundquist (inc.)	125,101	61.67%
Democratic	David R. Davis	72,062	35.52%
Independent	Rickey Boyette	2,290	1.13%
Independent	Jim Osburn	1,831	0.90%
Independent	Francis Frederick Tapp	1,573	0.78%
Write-In	Write-ins	9	0.00%
Total votes		202,866	100.00%
Republican hold			

== District 8 ==
Tennessee's 8th congressional district election, 1992
Party	Candidate	Votes	%
Democratic	John Tanner (inc.)	136,852	83.74%
Independent	Lawrence J. Barnes	9,605	5.88%
Independent	David L. Ward	6,930	4.24%
Independent	John E. Vinson	5,435	3.33%
Independent	Millard J. McKissack	4,600	2.81%
Write-In	Write-ins	10	0.01%
Total votes		163,432	100.00%
Democratic hold			

== District 9 ==
Tennessee's 9th congressional district election, 1992
Party	Candidate	Votes	%
Democratic	Harold Ford Sr. (inc.)	123,276	57.94%
Republican	Charles L. Black	60,606	28.49%
Independent	Richard Liptock	14,075	6.62%
Independent	James Vandergriff	12,265	5.76%
Independent	William Rolen	2,517	1.18%
Write-In	Write-ins	16	0.01%
Total votes		212,755	100.00%
Democratic hold			

== See also ==
- 1992 United States presidential election in Tennessee
- 1992 United States elections
