= 1988 United States House of Representatives elections in Tennessee =

- November 8, 1988

All 9 Tennessee seats to the United States House of Representatives
	Majority party	Minority party
Party	Democratic	Republican
Last election	6	3
Seats won	6	3
Seat change	Steady	Steady
Popular vote	844,210	536,480
Percentage	59.90%	38.07%
Swing	▲2.32%	▼2.55%

Democratic hold
Republican hold
Democratic
50–60%
60–70%
70–80%
80–90%
>90%
Republican
50–60%
80–90%

The 1988 congressional elections in Tennessee was held on November 8, 1988, to determine who will represent the state of Tennessee in the United States House of Representatives.

Following the 1988 elections, no seats changed hands, leaving the Tennessee delegation at a 6-3 Democratic majority.

== Overview ==
United States House of Representatives elections in Tennessee, 1988
Party	Votes	Percentage	Seats	+/–
Democratic	844,210	59.90%	6	—
Republican	536,480	38.07%	3	—
Independents	28,522	2.02%	0	—
Write-ins	109	0.01%	0	—
Totals	1,409,321	100.00%	9	—

Popular vote
Democratic	59.90%
Republican	38.07%
Other	2.03%

House seats
Democratic	66.67%
Republican	33.33%

== By district ==
District	Incumbent	Party	First elected	Result	Candidates
Tennessee 1	Jimmy Quillen	Republican	1962	Incumbent re-elected.	▌ ✓ Jimmy Quillen (Republican) 80.2%; ▌Sidney S. Smith (Democratic) 19.8%
Tennessee 2	John Duncan Sr.	Republican	1964	Incumbent died June 21, 1988. Republican hold. Winner was also elected to finish the current term; see here.	▌ ✓ Jimmy Duncan (Republican) 56.2%; ▌Dudley W. Taylor (Democratic) 43.8%
Tennessee 3	Marilyn Lloyd	Democratic	1974	Incumbent re-elected.	▌ ✓ Marilyn Lloyd (Democratic) 57.4%; ▌Harold L. Coker (Republican) 42.6%
Tennessee 4	Jim Cooper	Democratic	1982	Incumbent re-elected.	▌ ✓ Jim Cooper (Democratic); Uncontested
Tennessee 5	Bill Boner	Democratic	1978	Incumbent resigned October 5, 1987, to become Mayor of Nashville. New member elected January 19, 1988. Democratic hold. Winner was subsequently re-elected in November; see here.	▌ ✓ Bob Clement (Democratic); Uncontested
Tennessee 6	Bart Gordon	Democratic	1984	Incumbent re-elected.	▌ ✓ Bart Gordon (Democratic) 76.5%; ▌Wallace Embry (Republican) 23.5%
Tennessee 7	Don Sundquist	Republican	1982	Incumbent re-elected.	▌ ✓ Don Sundquist (Republican) 80.1%; ▌Ken Bloodworth (Democratic) 19.9%
Tennessee 8	Ed Jones	Democratic	1969	Incumbent retired. Democratic hold.	▌ ✓ John S. Tanner (Democratic) 62.4%; ▌Ed Bryant (Republican) 37.6%
Tennessee 9	Harold Ford Sr.	Democratic	1974	Incumbent re-elected.	▌ ✓ Harold Ford Sr. (Democratic) 81.6%; ▌Isaac Richmond (Independent) 18.4%

== See also ==
- 1988 United States presidential election in Tennessee
- 1988 United States elections
