= Richard R. Bond =

American academic administrator and politician (1927–2023)

President of the University of Northern Colorado
- In office 1971–1981
- Preceded by: Frank P. Lakin
- Succeeded by: Charles Manning (acting)

Member of the Colorado House of Representatives from the 50th district
- In office 1985–1991

Personal details
- Born: Richard Randolph Bond; December 1, 1927 Salem, West Virginia, U.S.
- Died: October 26, 2023 (aged 95)
- Party: Democratic
- Education: Salem College; West Virginia University; University of Wisconsin

Richard Randolph Bond (December 1, 1927 – October 26, 2023) was an American academic administrator and politician. He served as a Democratic member for the 50th district of the Colorado House of Representatives.

== Life and career ==
Bond was born in Salem, West Virginia, the son of Harley and Marcella Randolph Bond. He attended Salem College, West Virginia University and the University of Wisconsin. He was president of the University of Northern Colorado from 1971 to 1981.

In 1984, Bond defeated Eunice W. Fine in the general election for the 50th district of the Colorado House of Representatives, winning 52 percent of the votes. He assumed office in 1985 and served until 1991.

Bond died on October 26, 2023, at the age of 95.
