= 1982 United States House of Representatives elections in Tennessee =

- November 2, 1982

All 9 Tennessee seats to the United States House of Representatives
	Majority party	Minority party
Party	Democratic	Republican
Last election	5	3
Seats won	6	3
Seat change	▲1	Steady
Popular vote	697,823	469,527
Percentage	59.35%	39.94%
Swing	▲8.45%	▼7.51%

Democratic hold Democratic gain
Republican hold
Democratic
60–70%
70–80%
80–90%
90–100%
Republican
50–60%
70–80%
90–100%

The 1982 congressional elections in Tennessee was held on November 2, 1982, to determine who will represent the state of Tennessee in the United States House of Representatives.

Following the 1982 elections, Tennessee’s congressional delegation changed in size due to reapportionment after the 1980 United States census. The state regained the 9th congressional district that it had lost after the 1970 census, increasing its delegation from eight to nine members. The newly 4th congressional district, an open seat won by Democrat Jim Cooper, combined territory from several previous districts. Although the "4th district" designation had existed previously, the configuration used in 1982 was substantially different and had no incumbent. Cooper’s victory was considered a Democratic gain, resulting in a net increase of one seat for the Democratic Party and leaving the Tennessee delegation with a 6–3 Democratic majority.

== Overview ==
United States House of Representatives elections in Tennessee, 1982
Party	Votes	Percentage	Seats	+/–
Democratic	697,823	59.35%	6	▲1
Republican	469,527	39.94%	3	—
Independent	8,292	0.71%	0	—
Write-in	41	0.00%	0	—
Totals	1,175,683	100.00%	9	—

Popular vote
Democratic	59.35%
Republican	39.94%
Other	0.71%

House seats
Democratic	66.67%
Republican	33.33%

== By district ==
District	Incumbent			This race	
District	Member	Party	First elected	Results	Candidates
Tennessee 1	Jimmy Quillen	Republican	1962	Incumbent re-elected.	▌ ✓ Jimmy Quillen (Republican) 74.1%; ▌Jessie J. Cable (Democratic) 22.8%; ▌James B. Fields (Independent) 3.1%
Tennessee 2	John Duncan Sr.	Republican	1964	Incumbent re-elected.	▌ ✓ John Duncan Sr. (Republican) 100%
Tennessee 3	Marilyn Lloyd	Democratic	1974	Incumbent re-elected.	▌ ✓ Marilyn Lloyd (Democratic) 61.8%; ▌Glen Byers (Republican) 36.3%; ▌Henry Ford Brock (Independent) 1.9%
Tennessee 4	None (district created)			New seat. Democratic gain.	▌ ✓ Jim Cooper (Democratic) 66.1%; ▌Cissy Baker (Republican) 33.9%
Tennessee 5	Bill Boner	Democratic	1978	Incumbent re-elected.	▌ ✓ Bill Boner (Democratic) 80.2%; ▌Laurel Steinhice (Republican) 19.8%
Tennessee 6	Al Gore; Redistricted from the 4th district	Democratic	1976	Incumbent re-elected.	▌ ✓ Al Gore (Democratic) 100%
Tennessee 7	Robin Beard; Redistricted from the 6th district	Republican	1972	Incumbent retired to run for U.S. Senator. Republican hold.	▌ ✓ Don Sundquist (Republican) 50.50%; ▌Bob Clement (Democratic) 49.49%
Tennessee 8	Ed Jones; Redistricted from the 7th district	Democratic	1969 (special)	Incumbent re-elected.	▌ ✓ Ed Jones (Democratic) 74.9%; ▌Bruce Benson (Republican) 25.1%
Tennessee 9	Harold Ford Sr. Redistricted from the 8th district	Democratic	1974	Incumbent re-elected.	▌ ✓ Harold Ford Sr. (Democratic) 72.4%; ▌Joe Crawford (Republican) 26.4%; ▌Isaac Richmond (Independent) 1.2%

=== District 4 ===
The new 4th district ran diagonally across the state, from heavily Republican areas near the Tri-Cities, Knoxville and Chattanooga to the fringes of the Nashville suburbs. The district stretched across five media markets – the Tri-Cities (Kingsport, Johnson City, and Bristol), Knoxville, Chattanooga, Nashville and Huntsville, Alabama. The district touched four states – Virginia, Kentucky, Alabama, and Mississippi – and nearly touched North Carolina and Georgia.

Democratic nominee Jim Cooper defeated Cissy Baker, an editor in Washington for CNN and the daughter of U.S. Senate Majority Leader Howard Baker, with 66% of the vote, becoming the youngest member of Congress at the time at the age of 28.

Prior to this election, much of the eastern portion of the 4th had not been represented by a Democrat since the Civil War.

=== District 7 ===
Republican nominee Don Sundquist sought the seat of Congressman Robin Beard, who was retiring to run against Jim Sasser for the U.S. Senate. Beard's district, the 6th, had been renumbered as the 7th following redistricting. In the general election, Sundquist edged Bob Clement, son of former Governor Frank G. Clement, by just over 1,000 votes out of over 145,000 votes cast.

This district would not have a competitive general election again until the 2025 7th congressional district special election.

== See also ==
- 1982 United States Senate election in Tennessee
- 1982 Tennessee gubernatorial election
- 1982 United States elections
