= Marilyn Lloyd =

American politician (1929–2018)

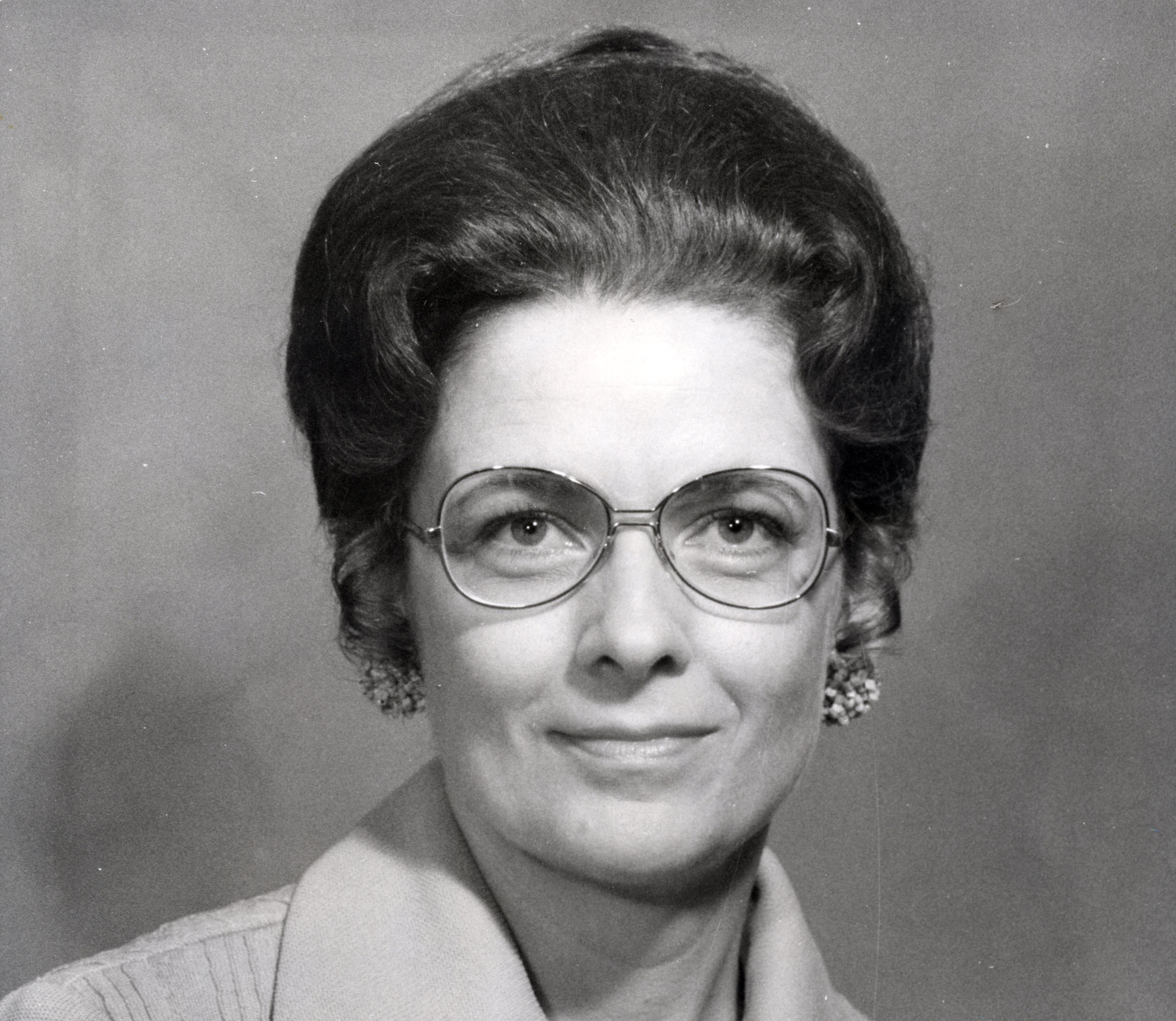

Member of the U.S. House of Representatives from Tennessee's 3rd district
- In office January 3, 1975 – January 3, 1995
- Preceded by: LaMar Baker
- Succeeded by: Zach Wamp

Personal details
- Born: Rachel Marilyn Laird; January 3, 1929 Fort Smith, Arkansas, U.S.
- Died: September 19, 2018 (aged 89) Chattanooga, Tennessee, U.S.
- Party: Democratic
- Spouses: Robert Davison (died); Morton Lloyd (died); Joseph Bouquard (divorced); Robert Fowler (died)
- Children: 4
- Education: University of Alabama (attended); Shorter University (attended)

Rachel Marilyn Lloyd (née Laird; January 3, 1929 – September 19, 2018) was an American politician and businesswoman who served ten terms in the United States House of Representatives from 1975 until 1995.

== Education and personal life ==
Laird was born in Fort Smith, Arkansas in 1929, the daughter of a Church of Christ pastor. She graduated from Western Kentucky College High School, a high school that associated with what is now Western Kentucky University, in Bowling Green, Kentucky, in 1945. She attended Shorter College in Rome, Georgia. She owned radio station WTTI in Dalton, Georgia, and Executive Aviation in Winchester, Tennessee.

Her first husband was Dr. Robert Earl Davison, a dentist in Trion, Georgia. After Davison's death in 1960, she married Chattanooga TV news anchor Mort Lloyd in 1963. He died in an airplane crash in 1974. In 1978, she married engineer Joseph P. Bouquard. In 1983, the couple divorced, and she resumed using the name Marilyn Lloyd. In 1991, she married Robert Fowler, a physician, who also predeceased her. Lloyd had three daughters from her marriage to Davison, and a son from her marriage to Lloyd.

== Political and congressional career ==
Mort Lloyd was a popular television anchor at WDEF-TV in Chattanooga, who had entered the 1974 Democratic primary for Tennessee's 3rd congressional district, to oppose two-term incumbent Republican Congressman LaMar Baker. Lloyd had won the primary in the Chattanooga-based district on August 1, but he was killed in an airplane crash on August 20 while flying to visit his parents, and the Democratic Party selected his widow to replace him on the ballot. She went on to defeat Baker in the General Election in November. That election saw many Republicans, in competitive and marginal districts, defeated, in large part because of the Watergate scandal. Lloyd was a moderate-to-conservative Democrat, receiving a score of 53% from the American Conservative Union.

=== Congress ===
She became the first woman ever elected to Congress from Tennessee for a full term. Willa Eslick, Louise Reece, and Irene Baker were all elected in special elections to succeed their husbands as caretakers and did not run for a full term in the next election. Lloyd was considered a conservative Democrat by national standards, but a moderate by Tennessee standards. She often broke with the Democratic Party's national leadership, her views reflecting those of her conservative-minded district.

Lloyd served on the House Science Committee for her entire congressional career. That committee had jurisdiction over legislation related to nuclear weapons and research facilities at Oak Ridge in her district. By the time of her retirement from Congress, she was the second-ranking Democrat on the committee. She was a strong advocate for the Clinch River Breeder Reactor project in Oak Ridge. She also served on the Committee on Public Works (1975–87), on the Armed Services Committee (1983–95), and on the House Select Committee on Aging for much of her congressional career.

When women members of the House formed a Women's Caucus in 1977, Lloyd was one of three congresswomen who declined membership, presumably because she feared alienating her constituents. She later joined the caucus but resigned in 1980 over political disagreements. Lloyd cosponsored legislation related to women's health, notably the Mammography Quality Standards Act, which was enacted in 1992. After she was diagnosed with breast cancer in 1991 and was denied a silicone breast implant because the U.S. Food and Drug Administration (FDA) had removed them from the market, Lloyd became an advocate for breast cancer treatment and women's health. She advocated for the availability of breast implants for reconstructive surgery. Her fight with cancer led her to reverse her longstanding opposition to abortion; she announced on the floor of the House that having to fight to make decisions about her treatment "that should have been mine alone" led to her change of heart on the issue.

In 1992, her Republican opponent was real estate broker Zach Wamp. In one of the closest contests of her career, she only defeated Wamp by 2,900 votes (1%), and only then because of the withdrawal of underground environmental candidate Peter Melcher. Lloyd lost badly in Hamilton County, home to Chattanooga, and retained her seat only due to a strong showing in the Oak Ridge area. Despite Tennessee's Senator Al Gore being elected Vice President as Bill Clinton's running mate, the Clinton–Gore Democratic ticket won the 3rd District by only 39 votes out of 225,000 cast, one of their worst performances in the state. The closeness of the race is believed to have influenced her decision not to stand for an 11th term in 1994. She endorsed Wamp's bid for Congress that year, which may have contributed to his narrow victory. That election was one of only two times since Lloyd left office that the Democrats have cleared the 40 percent mark in the district.

== Post-retirement and death ==
Subsequent to her retirement from Congress, Lloyd maintained a fairly low profile other than her advocacy for victims of domestic violence. The Marilyn Lloyd Environmental and Life Sciences Research Complex at Oak Ridge National Laboratory was named in her honor in 1999. Her Congressional papers are archived in the library of the University of Tennessee at Chattanooga.

Lloyd died on September 19, 2018, aged 89, at her home in Chattanooga, Tennessee. No cause of death was provided although in her obituary she was described as a "breast cancer survivor".

== See also ==
- Women in the United States House of Representatives

U.S. House of Representatives
Preceded by LaMar Baker	Member of the U.S. House of Representatives from Tennessee's 3rd congressional district 1975–1995	Succeeded by Zach Wamp
