= Haynesworth =

Haynesworth is a surname. Notable people with the surname include:

- Albert Haynesworth (born 1981), American football player
- Sincere Haynesworth, American football player
- Thomas Haynesworth (born 1965), African-American convict

== See also ==
- Haynsworth
