= Terry Haskins =

American politician

Member of the South Carolina House of Representatives from the 22 district
- In office 1986 – October 24, 2000
- Succeeded by: Gloria Arias Haskins

Member of the Greenville City Council from District 1
- In office 1983 – November 10, 1986
- Preceded by: Harry B. Luthi
- Succeeded by: Dayton H. Walker

Personal details
- Born: Terry Edward Haskins; January 31, 1955 Pontiac, Oakland County; Michigan, USA
- Died: October 24, 2000 (aged 45)
- Cause of death: Melanoma
- Party: Republican
- Spouse: Gloria Arias Haskins
- Children: David, Bryan, Hayden, and Harlan Haskins
- Parent(s): Charles "Ed" and Dorothy Haskins
- Education: Bob Jones University; University of South Carolina School of Law
- Occupation: Attorney

Terry Edward Haskins (January 31, 1955 – October 24, 2000) was a South Carolina Republican politician who served as the Speaker pro-tempore of the South Carolina House of Representatives from 1995 until his death five years later.

== Background ==
Haskins was the second of four children born in Pontiac in Oakland County in the Detroit, Michigan, metropolitan area to Charles "Ed" and Dorothy Haskins, who were evangelical Christians. As a high school student, Haskins developed his musical and dramatic talents and was elected president of his class.

In 1972, he entered fundamentalist Bob Jones University in Greenville, South Carolina, from which in 1976 he received a Bachelor of Arts in Speech and in 1978 a Master of Arts in public speaking. His graduate speech recital described his plan to become President of the United States. While still a graduate student at BJU, Haskins became chairman of the Greenville Young Republicans.

Haskins graduated in 1981 from the University of South Carolina School of Law in the capital city of Columbia and returned to Greenville to begin his legal practice.

== Political life ==
In 1983, he became at twenty-eight the youngest member ever elected to the Greenville City Council, in which he represented District 1 during the early tenure of Mayor Bill Workman. In 1986, Haskins was elected as a conservative Republican to the state legislature from the district that contained Bob Jones University and held that seat until his death. In 1990, he lost a bid for the United States House of Representatives from South Carolina's 4th congressional district to the Democrat Liz J. Patterson, who had previously defeated the Republicans Bill Workman in 1986 and Knox H. White in 1988, the current mayor of Greenville.

Although he continued to take conservative positions on such topics as sex education in the schools, Haskins quickly developed bipartisan relationships in the state legislature, having endorsed affirmative action, the election of African American judges, and the admission of women to The Citadel. Haskins's support for extending scholarships for South Carolina residents to the then-unaccredited Bob Jones University was accepted by the legislative Black Caucus because unaccredited black schools were also included in the final bill.

In 1995, Haskins was elected speaker pro-tempore of the House. By 1999, he was influential in settling the two most divisive political issues of the period, including the compromise by which the legislature was able to remove the Confederate battle flag from flying over the state capitol. Through careful political strategy, he was also able to end video poker in South Carolina, an issue that had led to the defeat in 1998 of one-term Republican Governor David Beasley.

Carl Langley, writing in the Edgefield Daily, declared:

Let us bow this morning to the ingenuity of Rep. Terry Haskins and the wisdom of our Supreme Court which stood up for the people while many elected to represent us took to cover in the tall grass. It was Haskins who wrote the amendment to poker legislation that called for its banishment if the court ruled against a referendum on the games. The Supreme Court, in unanimity I add, did just as Haskins expected. The court told the cowards in our legislature to enact our laws and not hand untidy things over to the people. There are few Medal of Honor winners in the General Assembly, but Haskins is a brave and fearless warrior who served the people well.

In October 1999, Haskins became co-chairman of the South Carolina campaign organization of U.S. Senator John McCain of Arizona. After the national furor over the campaign visit of McCain's intraparty opponent, George W. Bush, the governor of Texas, to Bob Jones University in February 2000, Haskins withdrew from the campaign because of what he called McCain's "religious baiting". Haskins and McCain remained personal friends.

== Death ==
The day that Haskins was elected speaker pro-tem in 1995, he discovered a lump under his right arm, which was quickly diagnosed as a melanoma. By July 2000, the cancer had spread to his brain, and he lost his hearing and most of the use of his left arm. At his death in October, he was nearly paralyzed. In January 2005, a Greenville bridge was named in his honor.

Haskins was survived by his wife, Gloria Arias Haskins, a native of Colombia, South America and their four sons, David, Bryan, Hayden, and Harlan Haskins. Mrs. Haskins successfully ran for her late husband's seat in the state legislature and became one of the first Latina members of the South Carolina legislature.
