= Portland Trail Blazers all-time roster =

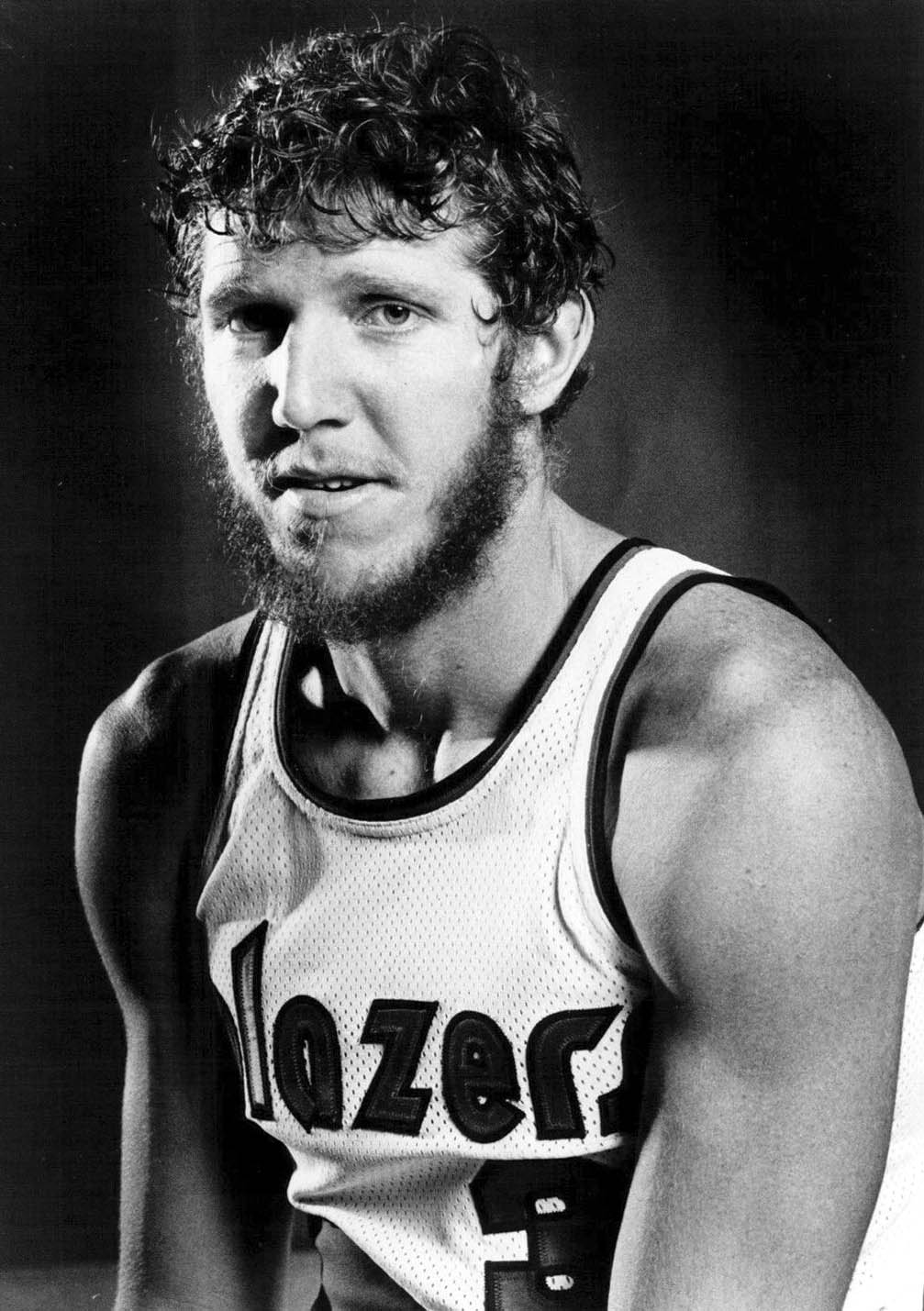
Bill Walton played for the Blazers from 1974–1979. He was named the NBA Finals Most Valuable Player for the 1977 NBA Finals and the regular season MVP in 1978.

The Portland Trail Blazers are an American professional basketball team based in Portland, Oregon. They play in the Northwest Division of the Western Conference in the National Basketball Association (NBA). The franchise was awarded to Portland on February 6, 1970, with their first season being 1970–71. The Trail Blazers originally played their home games in the Memorial Coliseum, before moving to the Rose Garden (renamed to the Moda Center in 2013) in 1995. The team has enjoyed a strong following; from 1977 through 1995, the team sold out 814 consecutive home games, the longest such streak in American major professional sports. The Trail Blazers are one of two teams in the major professional North American sports leagues located in the state of Oregon, with the other being the Portland Timbers. The Trail Blazers are also currently the only NBA team based in the binational Pacific Northwest, after the Vancouver Grizzlies relocated to Memphis and became the Memphis Grizzlies in 2001, and the Seattle SuperSonics relocated to Oklahoma City and became the Oklahoma City Thunder in 2008.

The team has advanced to the NBA Finals three times, winning the NBA Championship once, in 1977. The other NBA Finals appearances were in 1990 and 1992. The team has qualified for the playoffs in 38 times (as of the 2025–26 season) in the NBA, including a streak of 21 straight appearances from 1983 through 2003, tied for the second longest streak in NBA history. Eight Hall of Fame players have played for the Trail Blazers (Lenny Wilkens, Bill Walton, Clyde Drexler, Dražen Petrović, Arvydas Sabonis, Scottie Pippen, Walter Davis, and Carmelo Anthony). Walton is the franchise's most decorated player; he was the NBA Finals Most Valuable Player in 1977, and the regular season MVP the following year. Four Blazer rookies, Geoff Petrie, Sidney Wicks, Brandon Roy, and Damian Lillard, have won the NBA Rookie of the Year award. On December 19, 2022, Lillard became the team's all-time scoring leader, passing Drexler. Ten players have had their number retired by the team following their playing careers: Dave Twardzik (#13), Lionel Hollins (#14), Larry Steele (#15), Maurice Lucas (#20), Drexler (#22), Bob Gross (#30), Terry Porter (#30), Walton (#32), Lloyd Neal (#36), and Petrie (#45). Petrie was also the first ever draft pick made by the team.

== Players ==
Statistics updated through October 23, 2026.

The following is a list of the 407 players, both past and current, who appeared in at least one game for the Portland Trail Blazers NBA franchise.

Position key
Abbreviation	Meaning	Abbreviation	Meaning
G	Guard	G/F	Guard-forward
F	Forward	F/C	Forward-center
C	Center	—N/a	—N/a

Accomplishments key
Symbol	Meaning	Symbol	Meaning
^	Hall of Famer	(#)	Number retired by the Blazers
*	All-Star while with the Blazers and is currently on the roster	+	All-Star while with the Blazers
x	Player who is currently on the Blazers' roster	Δ	Denotes the Portland Trail Blazers statistics leader
‡	Hall of Famer and All-Star while with Blazers	—N/a	—N/a

=== A to B ===
All-time roster A to B
Player	Pos.	Pre-draft team	Yrs	Seasons	Statistics									Ref.
Player	Pos.	Pre-draft team	Yrs	Seasons	GP	MP	REB	AST	PTS	MPG	RPG	APG	PPG	Ref.
Alaa Abdelnaby	F/C	Duke	2	1990–1992	114	1,224	349	42	567	10.7	3.1	0.4	5.0	
Shareef Abdur-Rahim	F	California	2	2003–2005	86	2,595	536	158	1,228	30.2	6.2	1.8	14.3	
Rick Adelman	G	Loyola Marymount	3	1970–1973	237	6,570	668	1,087	2,333	27.7	2.8	4.6	9.8	
Arron Afflalo	G/F	UCLA	1	2014–2015	25	752	67	28	264	30.1	2.7	1.1	10.6	
Danny Ainge	G	BYU	2	1990–1992	161	3,305	353	487	1,674	20.5	2.2	3.0	10.4	
LaMarcus Aldridge^{+}	F/C	Texas	9	2006–2015	648	22,972	5,434^{Δ}	1,261	12,562	35.5	8.4	1.9	19.4	
Cliff Alexander	F	Kansas	1	2015–2016	8	36	6	0	10	4.5	0.8	0.0	1.3	
Al-Farouq Aminu	F	Wake Forest	4	2015–2019	293	8,478	2,085	425	2,775	28.9	7.1	1.5	9.5	
Dan Anderson	G	USC	2	1974–1976	95	1,067	91	166	347	11.2	1.0	1.7	3.7	
Derek Anderson	G	Kentucky	4	2001–2005	244	7,465	763	912	2,940	30.6	3.1	3.7	12.0	
Kenny Anderson	G	Georgia Tech	2	1996–1998	127	4,553	497	829	2,003	35.9	3.9	6.5	15.8	
Kim Anderson	F	Missouri	1	1978–1979	21	224	45	15	63	10.7	2.1	0.7	3.0	
Richard Anderson	F/C	UC Santa Barbara	2	1987–1989	134	2,379	517	206	787	17.8	3.9	1.5	5.9	
Carmelo Anthony^{^}	F	Syracuse	2	2019–2021	127	3,592	582	189	1,819	28.7	4.7	1.5	14.4	
Greg Anthony	G	UNLV	3	1998–2001	190	3,210	257	390	1,115	16.9	1.4	2.1	5.9	
Ryan Arcidiacono	G	Villanova	1	2022–2023	9	146	11	21	23	16.2	1.2	2.3	2.6	
Trevor Ariza	F	UCLA	1	2019–2020	21	702	87	100	231	33.4	4.8	2.0	11.0	
Vincent Askew	G/F	Memphis	1	1997–1998	30	443	68	38	66	14.8	2.3	1.3	2.2	
Stacey Augmon	G/F	UNLV	5	1996–2001	284	4,843	724	338	1,314	17.1	2.5	1.2	4.6	
Deni Avdija^{*}	F	(Israel) Maccabi Tel Aviv	3	2024–2027	140	4,421	992	733	2,861	31.6	7.1	5.2	20.4	
Dennis Awtrey	C	Santa Clara	1	1981–1982	10	121	14	8	15	12.1	1.4	0.8	1.5	
Jeff Ayres	F	Arizona State	1	2009–2010	39	405	98	1	104	10.4	2.5	0.0	2.7	
Deandre Ayton	C	Arizona	2	2023–2025	95	2,990	1,015	154	1,496	31.5	10.7	1.6	15.7	
Luke Babbitt	F	Nevada	3	2010–2013	126	1,404	262	51	482	11.1	2.1	0.4	3.8	
Ibou Badji	C	(Spain) Força Lleida CE	1	2023–2024	22	226	51	13	34	10.3	2.3	0.6	1.5	
Carl Bailey	C	Tuskegee	1	1981–1982	1	7	0	0	2	7.0	0.0	0.0	2.0	
Maurice Baker	G	Oklahoma State	1	2004–2005	4	18	2	1	0	4.5	0.5	0.3	0.0	
Wade Baldwin IV	G	Vanderbilt	2	2017–2019	23	174	23	17	68	7.6	1.0	0.7	3.0	
Dalano Banton	G	Nebraska	2	2023–2025	97	1,996	278	268	1,060	20.6	2.9	2.8	10.9	
Erick Barkley	G	St. John's	2	2000–2002	27	266	21	40	77	9.9	0.8	1.5	2.9	
Jim Barnett	G/F	Oregon	1	1970–1971	78	2,371	376	323	1,444	30.4	4.8	4.1	18.5	
Earl Barron	C	Memphis	1	2010–2011	2	37	14	3	7	18.5	7.0	1.5	3.5	
Will Barton	G	Memphis	3	2012–2015	144	1,581	253	118	551	11.0	1.8	0.8	3.8	
Billy Ray Bates	G	Kentucky State	3	1979–1982	168	3,024	294	338	2,074	18.0	1.8	2.0	12.3	
Nicolas Batum	G/F	(France) Le Mans	7	2008–2015	481	14,828	2,432	1,446	5,390	30.8	5.1	3.0	11.2	
Jerryd Bayless	G	Arizona	2	2008–2010	127	1,959	177	250	858	15.4	1.4	2.0	6.8	
Kent Bazemore	G/F	Old Dominion	1	2019–2020	43	1,111	172	61	340	25.8	4.0	1.4	7.9	
Walter Berry	F	St. John's	1	1986–1987	7	19	7	1	13	2.7	1.0	0.1	1.9	
Joe Binion	F	North Carolina A&T	1	1986–1987	11	51	18	1	14	4.6	1.6	0.1	1.3	
Steve Blake	G	Maryland	5	2005–2006; 2007–2010; 2014–2015	350	9,319	769	1,558	2,747	26.6	2.2	4.5	7.8	
Keljin Blevins	G	Montana State	2	2020–2022	48	424	55	23	107	8.8	1.1	0.5	2.2	
Ruben Boumtje-Boumtje	C	Georgetown	3	2001–2004	44	276	57	6	43	6.3	1.3	0.1	1.0	
Sam Bowie	F/C	Kentucky	4	1984–1987; 1988–1989	139	3,923	1,122	359	1,457	28.2	8.1	2.6	10.5	
Jamaree Bouyea	G	San Francisco	1	2023–2024	6	57	10	8	10	9.5	1.7	1.3	1.7	
Adrian Branch	G/F	Maryland	1	1988–1989	67	811	132	60	498	12.1	2.0	0.9	7.4	
Jim Brewer	F/C	Minnesota	1	1979–1980	67	1,016	257	75	194	15.2	3.8	1.1	2.9	
Ron Brewer	G	Arkansas	3	1978–1981	192	5,817	476	436	2,581	30.3	2.5	2.3	13.4	
Malcolm Brogdon	G	Virginia	1	2023–2024	39	1,121	148	214	613	28.7	3.8	5.5	15.7	
Greg Brown III	F	Texas	2	2021–2023	64	733	154	38	253	11.5	2.4	0.6	4.0	
Marcus Brown	G	Murray State	1	1996–1997	21	184	15	20	82	8.8	0.7	1.0	3.9	
Moses Brown	C	UCLA	2	2019–2020; 2023–2024	31	233	100	8	86	7.5	3.2	0.3	2.8	
Rick Brunson	G	Temple	2	1997–1998; 2001–2002	97	1,142	124	214	287	11.8	1.3	2.2	3.0	
Mark Bryant	F/C	Seton Hall	7	1988–1995	431	6,441	1,516	220	2,112	14.9	3.5	0.5	4.9	
Don Buse	G	Evansville	1	1982–1983	41	643	54	115	194	15.7	1.3	2.8	4.7	
John Butler Jr.	C	Florida State	1	2022–2023	19	221	17	11	45	11.6	0.9	0.6	2.4	
Mitchell Butler	G/F	UCLA	2	1996–1997; 2001–2002	60	555	67	35	177	9.3	1.1	0.6	3.0	

=== C ===
All-time roster C
Player	Pos.	Pre-draft team	Yrs	Seasons	Statistics									Ref.
Player	Pos.	Pre-draft team	Yrs	Seasons	GP	MP	REB	AST	PTS	MPG	RPG	APG	PPG	Ref.
Corky Calhoun	F	Penn	2	1976–1978	149	2,113	359	122	652	14.2	2.4	0.8	4.4	
Toumani Camara^{x}	F	Dayton	4	2023–2027	232	7,068	1,219	467	2,546	30.5	5.3	2.0	11.0	
Marcus Camby	F/C	UMass	3	2009–2012	122	3,152	1,215	231	591	25.8	10.0	1.9	4.8	
Geno Carlisle	G	California	1	2004–2005	6	16	1	1	8	2.7	0.2	0.2	1.3	
Kenny Carr	F	NC State	5	1982–1987	316	8,906	2,545	482	3,903	28.2	8.1	1.5	12.4	
Matt Carroll	G	Notre Dame	1	2003–2004	13	48	3	1	13	3.7	0.2	0.1	1.0	
Kelvin Cato	C	Iowa State	2	1997–1999	117	1,552	402	42	433	13.3	3.4	0.4	3.7	
Randolph Childress	G	Wake Forest	2	1995–1997	47	375	24	47	114	8.0	0.5	1.0	2.4	
Sidy Cissoko^{x}	F	G League Ignite	3	2024–2027	82	1,547	188	123	411	18.9	2.3	1.5	5.0	
Víctor Claver	F	(Spain) Valencia	3	2012–2015	80	1,072	178	56	258	13.4	2.2	0.7	3.2	
Barry Clemens	F	Ohio Wesleyan	2	1974–1976	126	1,395	231	109	552	11.1	1.8	0.9	4.4	
Donovan Clingan^{x}	C	UConn	3	2024–2027	146	3,459	1,436	244	1,389	23.7	9.8	1.7	9.5	
Jarron Collins	F/C	Stanford	1	2010–2011	5	24	7	1	2	4.8	1.4	0.2	0.4	
Zach Collins	F/C	Gonzaga	3	2017–2020	154	2,691	614	139	881	17.5	4.0	0.9	5.7	
Steve Colter	G	New Mexico State	2	1984–1986	159	3,330	327	500	1,262	20.9	2.1	3.1	7.9	
Chance Comanche	C	Arizona	1	2022–2023	1	21	3	0	7	21.0	3.0	0.0	7.0	
Pat Connaughton	G	Notre Dame	3	2015–2018	155	1,947	245	129	575	12.6	1.6	0.8	3.7	
Anthony Cook	F/C	Arizona	1	1995–1996	11	60	12	2	15	5.5	1.1	0.2	1.4	
Omar Cook	G	St. John's	1	2003–2004	17	139	6	24	14	8.2	0.4	1.4	0.8	
Javonte Cooke	G	Winston-Salem State	1	2025–2026	19	94	19	7	23	4.9	1.0	0.4	1.2	
Wayne Cooper	F/C	New Orleans	5	1982–1984; 1989–1992	342	6,027	1,715	279	2,093	17.6	5.0	0.8	6.1	
Robert Covington	F	Tennessee State	2	2020–2022	118	3,674	740	185	958	31.1	6.3	1.6	8.1	
Allen Crabbe	G/F	California	4	2013–2017	226	5,142	524	238	1,878	22.8	2.3	1.1	8.3	
Jamal Crawford	G	Michigan	1	2011–2012	60	1,613	118	191	837	26.9	2.0	3.2	14.0	
Geoff Crompton	C	North Carolina	1	1980–1981	6	33	18	2	9	5.5	3.0	0.3	1.5	
John Crotty	G	Virginia	2	1997–1999	29	398	33	68	108	13.7	1.1	2.3	3.7	
Jarron Cumberland	G	Cincinnati	1	2021–2022	3	12	3	1	2	4.0	0.7	0.3	0.7	
Dante Cunningham	F	Villanova	2	2009–2011	119	1,815	349	44	527	15.3	2.9	0.4	4.4	
Seth Curry	G	Duke	1	2018–2019	74	1,399	120	66	581	18.9	1.6	0.9	7.9	

=== D to E ===
All-time roster D to E
Player	Pos.	Pre-draft team	Yrs	Seasons	Statistics									Ref.
Player	Pos.	Pre-draft team	Yrs	Seasons	GP	MP	REB	AST	PTS	MPG	RPG	APG	PPG	Ref.
Antonio Daniels	G	Bowling Green	1	2002–2003	67	872	72	85	251	13.0	1.1	1.3	3.7	
Bob Davis	F	Weber State	1	1972–1973	9	41	5	2	16	4.6	0.6	0.2	1.8	
Charlie Davis	G	Wake Forest	2	1972–1974	77	1,423	122	186	643	18.5	1.6	2.4	8.4	
Dale Davis	F/C	Clemson	4	2000–2004	313	8,573	2,256	365	2,232	27.4	7.2	1.2	7.1	
Ed Davis	F	North Carolina	3	2015–2018	205	3,944	1,418	154	1,140	19.2	6.9	0.8	5.6	
Johnny Davis	G	Dayton	2	1976–1978	161	3,639	299	365	1,508	22.6	1.9	2.3	9.4	
Walter Davis^{^}	G/F	North Carolina	1	1990–1991	32	439	58	41	196	13.7	1.8	1.3	6.1	
Dan Dickau	G	Gonzaga	2	2003–2004; 2006–2007	70	595	53	90	212	8.5	0.8	1.3	3.0	
Kaniel Dickens	F	Idaho	1	2003–2004	3	12	2	0	7	4.0	0.7	0.0	2.3	
Travis Diener	G	Marquette	1	2009–2010	5	26	1	4	3	5.2	0.2	0.8	0.6	
Ike Diogu	F	Arizona State	1	2008–2009	19	73	17	0	27	3.8	0.9	0.0	1.4	
Terry Dischinger	G/F	Purdue	1	1972–1973	63	970	190	103	386	15.4	3.0	1.6	6.1	
Juan Dixon	G	Maryland	2	2005–2007	131	3,163	262	231	1,425	24.1	2.0	1.8	10.9	
Aleksandar Đorđević	G	(Serbia) Partizan	1	1996–1997	8	61	5	5	25	7.6	0.6	0.6	3.1	
Jacky Dorsey	F	Georgia	1	1977–1978	4	51	10	3	25	12.8	2.5	0.8	6.3	
Clyde Drexler^{‡} (#22)	G	Houston	12^{Δ}	1983–1995	867^{Δ}	29,496^{Δ}	5,339	4,933	18,040	34.0	6.2	5.7	20.8	
Kevin Duckworth^{+}	C	Eastern Illinois	7	1986–1993	527	14,595	3,327	498	7,188	27.7	6.3	0.9	13.6	
Chris Dudley	C	Yale	6	1993–1997; 2001–2003	295	6,433	2,183	130	1,230	21.8	7.4	0.4	4.2	
Kris Dunn	G	Providence	1	2021–2022	14	336	49	79	106	24.0	3.5	5.6	7.6	
T. R. Dunn	G/F	Alabama	3	1977–1980	225	4,437	815	295	1,415	19.7	3.6	1.3	6.3	
James Edwards	F/C	Washington	1	1994–1995	28	266	43	8	75	9.5	1.5	0.3	2.7	
Mario Elie	G/F	American International	1	1992–1993	82	1,757	216	177	708	21.4	2.6	2.2	8.6	
C. J. Elleby	G	Washington State	2	2020–2022	88	1,366	259	97	407	15.5	2.9	1.1	4.6	
LeRoy Ellis	F/C	St. John's	1	1970–1971	74	2,581	907	235	1,179	34.9	12.3	3.2	15.9	
Chris Engler	C	Wyoming	1	1986–1987	7	17	8	1	11	2.4	1.1	0.1	1.6	
Claude English	F	Rhode Island	1	1970–1971	18	70	20	6	27	3.9	1.1	0.3	1.5	
Drew Eubanks	C/F	Oregon State	2	2022–2023	100	2,234	604	138	836	22.3	6.0	1.4	8.4	

=== F to G ===
All-time roster F to G
Player	Pos.	Pre-draft team	Yrs	Seasons	Statistics									Ref.
Player	Pos.	Pre-draft team	Yrs	Seasons	GP	MP	REB	AST	PTS	MPG	RPG	APG	PPG	Ref.
Raymond Felton	G	North Carolina	1	2011–2012	60	1,906	149	390	684	31.8	2.5	6.5	11.4	
Desmond Ferguson	G/F	Detroit Mercy	1	2003–2004	7	32	4	1	13	4.6	0.6	0.1	1.9	
Rudy Fernández	G	(Spain) Joventut Badalona	3	2008–2011	218	5,255	543	479	1,986	24.1	2.5	2.2	9.1	
Rolando Ferreira	C	Houston	1	1988–1989	12	34	13	1	9	2.8	1.1	0.1	0.8	
Jonny Flynn	G	Syracuse	1	2011–2012	18	281	31	68	94	15.6	1.7	3.8	5.2	
Richie Frahm	G	Gonzaga	1	2004–2005	43	499	61	30	164	11.6	1.4	0.7	3.8	
Tim Frazier	G	Penn State	2	2014–2016	40	340	48	59	74	8.5	1.2	1.5	1.9	
Joel Freeland	F/C	(Spain) Gran Canaria	3	2012–2015	151	1,821	518	65	477	12.1	3.4	0.4	3.2	
Enes Freedom	C	(Turkey) Fenerbahçe	2	2018–2019; 2020–2021	95	2,270	993	116	1,107	23.9	10.5	1.2	11.7	
Channing Frye	F/C	Arizona	2	2007–2009	141	2,088	494	81	793	14.8	3.5	0.6	5.6	
Bernie Fryer	G	BYU	1	1973–1974	80	1,674	159	279	559	20.9	2.0	3.5	7.0	
Wenyen Gabriel	F	Kentucky	1	2019–2020	19	174	42	5	44	9.2	2.2	0.3	2.3	
Mike Gale	G	Elizabeth City State	1	1980–1981	42	476	47	70	179	11.3	1.1	1.7	4.3	
Kevin Gamble	G/F	Iowa	1	1987–1988	9	19	3	1	0	2.1	0.3	0.1	0.0	
Alonzo Gee	G	Alabama	1	2014–2015	15	151	24	6	51	10.1	1.6	0.4	3.4	
Harry Giles	F/C	Duke	1	2020–2021	38	348	133	29	108	9.2	3.5	0.8	2.8	
Eddie Gill	G	Weber State	1	2003–2004	22	157	17	16	50	7.1	0.8	0.7	2.3	
Herm Gilliam	G/F	Purdue	1	1976–1977	80	1,665	201	170	744	20.8	2.5	2.1	9.3	
Walt Gilmore	F	Fort Valley State	1	1970–1971	27	261	73	12	58	9.7	2.7	0.4	2.1	
Stephen Graham	G	Oklahoma State	1	2006–2007	14	165	21	5	45	11.8	1.5	0.4	3.2	
Brian Grant	F	Xavier	3	1997–2000	172	4,768	1,369	217	1,746	27.7	8.0	1.3	10.2	
Gary Grant	G	Michigan	4	1997–2001	31	407	51	89	127	13.1	1.6	2.9	4.1	
Harvey Grant	F	Oklahoma	3	1993–1996	228	6,277	996	300	2,190	27.5	4.4	1.3	9.6	
Jerami Grant	F	Syracuse	4	2022–2026	221	7,595	835	525	4,159	33.0	3.8	2.4	18.8	
Taurean Green	G	Florida	1	2007–2008	8	44	4	8	17	5.5	0.5	1.0	2.1	
Gary Gregor	F/C	South Carolina	2	1970–1972	126	3,524	925	268	1,333	28.0	7.3	2.1	10.6	
Bob Gross (#30)	G/F	Long Beach State	7	1975–1982	486	12,202	2,187	1,447	4,484	25.1	4.5	3.0	9.2	
Pétur Guðmundsson	C	Washington	1	1981–1982	68	845	186	59	219	12.4	2.7	0.9	3.2	

=== H to J ===
All-time roster H to J
Player	Pos.	Pre-draft team	Yrs	Seasons	Statistics									Ref.
Player	Pos.	Pre-draft team	Yrs	Seasons	GP	MP	REB	AST	PTS	MPG	RPG	APG	PPG	Ref.
Ha Seung-jin	C	(South Korea) Yonsei University	2	2004–2006	46	316	67	3	70	6.9	1.5	0.1	1.5	
Ashton Hagans	G	Kentucky	1	2023–2024	19	316	45	54	80	16.6	2.4	2.8	4.2	
Shaler Halimon	G/F	Utah State	1	1970–1971	79	1,629	415	211	707	20.6	5.3	2.7	8.9	
Roy Hamilton	G	UCLA	1	1980–1981	1	5	3	0	3	5.0	3.0	0.0	3.0	
Maurice Harkless	G/F	St. John's	4	2015–2019	274	6,359	1,052	282	2,116	23.2	3.8	1.0	7.7	
Mike Harper	F/C	North Park	2	1980–1982	123	1,894	432	71	613	15.4	3.5	0.6	5.0	
Shaquille Harrison	G	Tulsa	1	2022–2023	5	120	22	30	44	24.0	4.4	6.0	8.8	
Josh Hart	F/G	Villanova	2	2022–2023	64	2,121	487	256	746	33.1	7.6	4.0	11.7	
Antonio Harvey	F/C	Pfeiffer	2	1999–2001	31	209	47	9	72	6.7	1.5	0.3	2.3	
Steve Hawes	F/C	Washington	1	1975–1976	66	1,360	479	105	475	20.6	7.3	1.6	7.2	
Gerald Henderson Jr.	G	Duke	1	2015–2016	72	1,431	211	75	624	19.9	2.9	1.0	8.7	
Scoot Henderson^{x}	G	G League Ignite	4	2023–2027	130	4,312	475	786	2,151	27.0	3.0	4.9	13.4	
Steve Henson	G	Kansas State	1	1994–1995	37	380	26	85	119	10.3	0.7	2.3	3.2	
Mario Hezonja	F	Croatia	1	2019–2020	53	871	184	50	256	16.4	2.9	0.9	4.8	
JJ Hickson	F/C	NC State	2	2011–2013	99	2,923	986	111	1,305	29.5	10.0	1.1	13.2	
Sean Higgins	G/F	Michigan	1	1997–1998	2	12	0	0	0	6.0	0.0	0.0	0.0	
Jaylen Hoard	F	Wake Forest	1	2019–2020	13	103	32	4	38	7.9	2.5	0.3	2.9	
Jrue Holiday^{x}	G	UCLA	2	2025–2027	55	1,607	251	331	885	29.2	4.6	6.0	16.1	
Lionel Hollins^{+} (#14)	G	Arizona State	5	1975–1980	315	9,236	831	1,374	4,379	29.3	2.6	4.4	13.9	
Rondae Hollis-Jefferson	F	Arizona	1	2020–2021	11	107	26	13	27	9.7	2.4	1.2	2.5	
Michael Holton	G	UCLA	2	1986–1988	140	1,758	187	284	627	12.6	1.3	2.0	4.5	
Rodney Hood	G/F	Duke	3	2018–2021	86	2,004	190	113	668	23.3	2.2	1.3	7.8	
Juwan Howard	F	Michigan	1	2009–2010	73	1,632	335	61	437	22.4	4.6	0.8	6.0	
Elijah Hughes	G/F	Syracuse	1	2021–2022	22	322	41	16	83	14.6	1.9	0.7	3.8	
Darrall Imhoff	C	California	1	1971–1972	40	404	107	50	105	10.1	2.7	1.3	2.6	
Byron Irvin	G	Missouri	1	1989–1990	50	488	74	47	258	9.8	1.5	0.9	5.2	
Jarrett Jack	G	Georgia Tech	3	2005–2008	240	6,479	602	949	2,286	27.0	2.5	4.0	9.5	
Jaren Jackson	G/F	Georgetown	1	1993–1994	29	187	17	27	80	6.4	0.6	0.9	2.8	
Jim Jackson	G	Ohio State	1	1998–1999	49	1,175	159	128	414	24.0	3.2	2.6	8.4	
Abdul Jeelani	F/C	Wisconsin-Parkside	1	1979–1980	77	1,286	270	95	737	16.7	3.5	1.2	9.6	
Jared Jeffries	F	Indiana	1	2012–2013	38	350	60	14	44	9.2	1.6	0.4	1.2	
Armon Johnson	G	Nevada	2	2010–2012	39	282	37	45	112	7.2	0.9	1.2	2.9	
Chris Johnson	C	LSU	2	2010–2012	30	199	45	3	59	6.6	1.5	0.1	2.0	
Clemon Johnson	F/C	Florida A&M	1	1978–1979	74	794	226	78	240	10.7	3.1	1.1	3.2	
Dave Johnson	G/F	Syracuse	1	1992–1993	42	356	48	13	157	8.5	1.1	0.3	3.7	
John Johnson	F	Iowa	3	1973–1976	158	5,039	1,056	544	2,525	31.9	6.7	3.4	16.0	
Ken Johnson	F	Michigan State	1	1985–1986	64	815	243	19	263	12.7	3.8	0.3	4.1	
Keon Johnson	G	Tennessee	2	2021–2023	62	978	104	122	403	15.8	1.7	2.0	6.5	
Ollie Johnson	F	Temple	2	1972–1974	157	3,856	741	367	1,267	24.6	4.7	2.3	8.1	
Steve Johnson	F/C	Oregon State	3	1986–1989	194	4,872	1,166	317	2,713	25.1	6.0	1.6	14.0	
Nate Johnston	F	Tampa	1	1989–1990	15	74	21	1	35	4.9	1.4	0.1	2.3	
Caldwell Jones	F/C	Albany State	4	1985–1989	309	6,072	1,518	278	1,231	19.7	4.9	0.9	4.0	
Charles Jones	F	Louisville	1	1987–1988	37	186	31	8	51	5.0	0.8	0.2	1.4	
Derrick Jones Jr.	F	UNLV	1	2020–2021	58	1,318	205	47	396	22.7	3.5	0.8	6.8	
Fred Jones	G/F	Oregon	1	2006–2007	24	449	33	53	115	18.7	1.4	2.2	4.8	
James Jones	G/F	Miami (FL)	1	2007–2008	58	1,276	161	34	463	22.0	2.8	0.6	8.0	
Robin Jones	F/C	Saint Louis	1	1976–1977	63	1,065	296	80	344	16.9	4.7	1.3	5.5	
Steve Jones	G/F	Oregon	1	1975–1976	64	819	75	63	414	12.8	1.2	1.0	6.5	
Eddie Jordan	G	Rutgers	1	1983–1984	13	183	13	39	33	14.1	1.0	3.0	2.5	
Reggie Jordan	G	New Mexico State	1	1996–1997	9	99	23	11	20	11.0	2.6	1.2	2.2	
Jeff Judkins	G/F	Utah	1	1982–1983	34	309	43	17	105	9.1	1.3	0.5	3.1	

=== K to L ===
All-time roster K to L
Player	Pos.	Pre-draft team	Yrs	Seasons	Statistics									Ref.
Player	Pos.	Pre-draft team	Yrs	Seasons	GP	MP	REB	AST	PTS	MPG	RPG	APG	PPG	Ref.
Chris Kaman	C	Central Michigan	2	2014–2016	90	1,510	508	76	682	16.8	5.6	0.8	7.6	
Shawn Kemp	F/C	Concord HS (IN)	2	2000–2002	143	2,315	547	117	895	16.2	3.8	0.8	6.3	
Jayson Kent^{x}	F	Texas	2	2025–2027	6	29	6	0	10	4.8	1.0	0.0	1.7	
Steve Kerr	G	Arizona	1	2001–2002	65	775	60	63	269	11.9	0.9	1.0	4.1	
Jerome Kersey	F	Longwood	11	1984–1995	831	21,760	5,078	1,762	10,067	26.2	6.1	2.1	12.1	
Victor Khryapa	F	(Russia) CSKA Moscow	2	2004–2006	101	2,015	415	113	538	20.0	4.1	1.1	5.3	
Joe Kleine	C	Arkansas	1	1999–2000	7	31	6	2	11	4.4	0.9	0.3	1.6	
Negele Knight	G	Dayton	1	1994–1995	3	43	3	11	18	14.3	1.0	3.7	6.0	
Ron Knight	F	Cal State Los Angeles	2	1970–1972	101	1,145	283	83	472	11.3	2.8	0.8	4.7	
Kevin Knox II	F	Kentucky	1	2022–2023	21	359	69	18	178	17.1	3.3	0.9	8.5	
Vít Krejčí^{x}	G	(Spain) Basket Zaragoza	2	2025–2027	21	383	55	35	137	18.2	2.6	1.7	6.5	
Kevin Kunnert	F/C	Iowa	3	1979–1982	94	1,381	465	114	419	14.7	4.9	1.2	4.5	
Skal Labissière	F	Kentucky	2	2018–2020	42	630	188	47	221	15.0	4.5	1.1	5.3	
Raef LaFrentz	F/C	Kansas	2	2006–2008	66	643	137	14	165	9.7	2.1	0.2	2.5	
Jeff Lamp	G/F	Virginia	3	1981–1984	177	1,967	203	137	825	11.1	1.1	0.8	4.7	
Jake Layman	F	Maryland	3	2016–2019	141	1,736	257	75	653	12.3	1.8	0.5	4.6	
Mo Layton	G	USC	1	1973–1974	22	327	33	51	124	14.9	1.5	2.3	5.6	
T. J. Leaf	F	UCLA	1	2020–2021	7	35	5	1	12	5.0	0.7	0.1	1.7	
Greg Lee	G	UCLA	1	1975–1976	5	35	2	11	6	7.0	0.4	2.2	1.2	
Voshon Lenard	G	Minnesota	1	2005–2006	14	220	19	23	92	15.7	1.4	1.6	6.6	
Meyers Leonard	F/C	Illinois	7	2012–2019	393	6,095	1,470	338	2,183	15.5	3.7	0.9	5.6	
Fat Lever	G	Arizona State	2	1982–1984	162	4,030	443	798	1,421	24.9	2.7	4.9	8.8	
Damian Lillard^{*}	G	Weber State	12	2012–2023; 2026–2027	771	27,999	3,261	5,159	19,420^{Δ}	36.3	4.2	6.7	25.2^{Δ}	
Alton Lister	F/C	Arizona State	1	1997–1998	7	44	11	1	6	6.3	1.6	0.1	0.9	
Nassir Little	F	North Carolina	4	2019–2023	192	3,277	613	149	1,161	17.1	3.2	0.8	6.0	
Robin Lopez	C	Stanford	2	2013–2015	141	4,241	1,094	128	1,474	30.1	7.8	0.9	10.5	
Didi Louzada	F/G	(Brazil) Sesi/Franca	1	2021–2022	7	122	15	4	35	17.4	2.1	0.6	5.0	
Caleb Love	G	Arizona	1	2025–2026	49	1,013	114	123	509	20.7	2.3	2.5	10.4	
Maurice Lucas^{+} (#20)	F/C	Marquette	5	1976–1980; 1987–1988	330	9,811	2,876	836	5,151	29.7	8.7	2.5	15.6	
Phil Lumpkin	G	Miami (OH)	1	1974–1975	48	792	59	177	202	16.5	1.2	3.7	4.2	

=== M ===
All-time roster M
Player	Pos.	Pre-draft team	Yrs	Seasons	Statistics									Ref.
Player	Pos.	Pre-draft team	Yrs	Seasons	GP	MP	REB	AST	PTS	MPG	RPG	APG	PPG	Ref.
Jamaal Magloire	C	Kentucky	1	2006–2007	81	1,703	492	30	529	21.0	6.1	0.4	6.5	
Ed Manning	F	Jackson State	1	1970–1971	79	1,558	411	111	561	19.7	5.2	1.4	7.1	
Sean Marks	F/C	California	1	2010–2011	29	208	40	4	45	7.2	1.4	0.1	1.6	
Jim Marsh	F	USC	1	1971–1972	39	375	84	30	119	9.6	2.2	0.8	3.1	
Brian Martin	F	Kansas	1	1985–1986	5	14	0	0	4	2.8	0.0	0.0	0.8	
LaRue Martin	C	Loyola (IL)	4	1972–1976	271	3,795	1,258	203	1,430	14.0	4.6	0.7	5.3	
Fernando Martín	C	(Spain) Real Madrid Baloncesto	1	1986–1987	24	146	28	9	22	6.1	1.2	0.4	0.9	
Wesley Matthews	G	Marquette	5	2010–2015	359	12,193	1,184	787	5,525	34.0	3.3	2.2	15.4	
Clyde Mayes	F	Furman	1	1976–1977	5	24	6	0	4	4.8	1.2	0.0	0.8	
Eric Maynor	G	VCU	1	2012–2013	27	572	28	109	187	21.2	1.0	4.0	6.9	
Skylar Mays	G	LSU	2	2022–2024	27	545	56	125	225	20.2	2.1	4.6	8.3	
Willie McCarter	G	Drake	1	1971–1972	39	612	43	85	243	15.7	1.1	2.2	6.2	
CJ McCollum	G	Lehigh	9	2013–2022	564	17,746	1,925	1,892	10,710	31.5	3.4	3.4	19.0	
Hank McDowell	F/C	Memphis	1	1982–1983	42	375	89	20	123	8.9	2.1	0.5	2.9	
Bryce McGowens	G	Nebraska	1	2024–2025	13	32	3	2	13	2.5	0.2	0.2	1.0	
Cameron McGriff	F	Oklahoma State	1	2021–2022	3	46	15	3	14	15.3	5.0	1.0	4.7	
Jeff McInnis	G	North Carolina	2	2002–2004	114	2,580	191	366	897	22.6	1.7	3.2	7.9	
Stan McKenzie	G/F	NYU	3	1970–1973	171	4,433	602	391	2,302	25.9	3.5	2.3	13.5	
Aaron McKie	G	Temple	3	1994–1997	167	3,861	526	378	1,327	23.1	3.1	2.3	7.9	
Ben McLemore	G/F	Kansas	1	2021–2022	64	1,285	103	59	655	20.1	1.6	0.9	10.2	
Jim McMillian	F	Columbia	1	1978–1979	23	278	39	33	83	12.1	1.7	1.4	3.6	
Josh McRoberts	F	Duke	1	2007–2008	8	28	10	2	12	3.5	1.3	0.3	1.5	
Darius Miles	F	East St. Louis HS (IL)	3	2003–2006	145	4,176	673	284	1,899	28.8	4.6	2.0	13.1	
Andre Miller	G	Utah	2	2009–2011	163	5,150	568	1,011	2,175	31.6	3.5	6.2	13.3	
Patty Mills	G	Saint Mary's	2	2009–2011	74	821	53	114	379	11.1	0.7	1.5	5.1	
Justin Minaya	F	Providence	3	2022–2025	57	571	81	32	96	10.0	1.4	0.6	1.7	
Sergei Monia	F	(Russia) CSKA Moscow	1	2005–2006	23	336	51	19	75	14.6	2.2	0.8	3.3	
Luis Montero	G	Westchester CC	1	2015–2016	12	42	4	1	14	3.5	0.3	0.1	1.2	
Tazé Moore	G	Cal State Bakersfield	2	2023–2025	6	60	16	6	24	10.0	2.7	1.0	4.0	
Ja Morant^{x}	G	Murray State	1	2026–2027	2	49	8	15	26	24.5	4.0	7.5	13.0	
Ronnie Murphy	F	Jacksonville	1	1987–1988	18	89	11	6	36	4.9	0.6	0.3	2.0	
Kris Murray	F	Iowa	3	2023–2026	188	3,721	612	229	994	19.8	3.3	1.2	5.3	
Tracy Murray	F	UCLA	4	1992–1995; 2003–2004	150	1,663	236	57	884	11.1	1.6	0.4	5.9	
Dorie Murrey	F/C	Detroit Mercy	1	1970–1971	2	20	7	1	11	10.0	3.5	0.5	5.5	

=== N to P ===
All-time roster N to P
Player	Pos.	Pre-draft team	Yrs	Seasons	Statistics									Ref.
Player	Pos.	Pre-draft team	Yrs	Seasons	GP	MP	REB	AST	PTS	MPG	RPG	APG	PPG	Ref.
Larry Nance Jr.	C/F	Wyoming	1	2021–2022	37	858	209	73	255	23.2	5.6	2.1	6.9	
Shabazz Napier	G	UConn	2	2016–2018	127	2,047	231	217	862	16.1	1.8	1.7	6.8	
Calvin Natt	F	Louisiana–Monroe	5	1979–1984	333	11,038	2,297	716	5,738	33.1	6.9	2.2	17.2	
Craig Neal	G	Georgia Tech	1	1988–1989	21	159	11	32	25	7.6	0.5	1.5	1.2	
Lloyd Neal (#36)	F/C	Tennessee State	7	1972–1979	435	11,015	3,370	632	4,846	25.3	7.7	1.5	11.1	
Ruben Nembhard	G	Weber State	1	1996–1997	2	19	0	5	8	9.5	0.0	2.5	4.0	
Audie Norris	C	Jackson State	3	1982–1985	187	2,585	576	147	819	13.8	3.1	0.8	4.4	
Willie Norwood	F	Alcorn State	1	1977–1978	19	351	65	19	110	18.5	3.4	1.0	5.8	
Jusuf Nurkić	C	(Croatia) Cedevita Junior	7	2016–2023	324	8,749	3,167	902	4,662	27.0	9.8	2.8	14.4	
Fabricio Oberto	F/C	(Argentina) Atenas de Cordoba	1	2010–2011	5	45	7	0	7	9.0	1.4	0.0	1.4	
Greg Oden	C	Ohio State	2	2008–2010	82	1,816	602	50	773	22.1	7.3	0.6	9.4	
Jermaine O'Neal	F/C	Eau Claire HS (SC)	4	1996–2000	211	2,436	651	56	817	11.5	3.1	0.3	3.9	
Travis Outlaw	F	Starkville HS (MS)	7	2003–2010	377	8,160	1,276	319	3,607	21.6	3.4	0.8	9.6	
Tom Owens	F/C	South Carolina	4	1977–1981	319	8,685	2,310	795	4,437	27.2	7.2	2.5	13.9	
Robert Pack	G	USC	1	1991–1992	72	894	97	140	332	12.4	1.3	1.9	4.6	
Georgios Papagiannis	C	(Greece) Panathinaikos	1	2017–2018	1	4	1	0	2	4.0	1.0	0.0	2.0	
Ruben Patterson	F	Cincinnati	5	2001–2006	341	8,084	1,257	545	3,318	23.7	3.7	1.6	9.7	
Aleksandar Pavlović	G/F	(Montenegro) Budućnost	1	2012–2013	39	528	56	32	103	13.5	1.4	0.8	2.6	
Jim Paxson^{+}	G/F	Dayton	9	1979–1988	627	18,398	1,415	2,007	10,003	29.3	2.3	3.2	16.0	
Gary Payton II	G	Oregon State	1	2022–2023	15	255	39	22	61	17.0	2.6	1.5	4.1	
Will Perdue	C	Vanderbilt	1	2000–2001	13	58	18	2	14	4.5	1.4	0.2	1.1	
Reggie Perry	F	Mississippi State	1	2021–2022	9	177	46	12	90	19.7	5.1	1.3	10.0	
Wesley Person	G	Auburn	1	2003–2004	33	621	74	38	215	18.8	2.2	1.2	6.5	
Geoff Petrie^{+} (#45)	G	Princeton	6	1970–1976	446	16,787	1,271	2,057	9,732	37.6	2.8	4.6	21.8	
Dražen Petrović^{^}	G	(Croatia) Cibona	2	1989–1991	95	1,100	129	136	663	11.6	1.4	1.4	7.0	
Tom Piotrowski	C	La Salle	1	1983–1984	18	78	16	5	30	4.3	0.9	0.3	1.7	
Scottie Pippen^{^}	G/F	Central Arkansas	4	1999–2003	272	8,789	1,445	1,348	3,091	32.3	5.3	5.0	11.4	
Mason Plumlee	F/C	Duke	2	2015–2017	136	3,600	1,060	440	1,346	26.5	7.8	3.2	9.9	
Terry Porter^{+} (#30)	G	Wisconsin-Stevens Point	10	1985–1995	758	23,978	2,620	5,319^{Δ}	11,330	31.6	3.5	7.0	14.9	
Micah Potter^{x}	C	Wisconsin	1	2026–2027	1	12	3	0	4	12.0	3.0	0.0	4.0	
Norman Powell	G	UCLA	2	2020–2022	67	2,261	220	134	1,206	33.7	3.3	2.0	18.0	
Ronnie Price	G	Utah Valley	1	2012–2013	39	510	44	73	105	13.1	1.1	1.9	2.7	
Joel Przybilla	C	Minnesota	8	2004–2012	422	9,300	3,010	210	1,968	22.0	7.1	0.5	4.7	

=== Q to R ===
All-time roster Q to R
Player	Pos.	Pre-draft team	Yrs	Seasons	Statistics									Ref.
Player	Pos.	Pre-draft team	Yrs	Seasons	GP	MP	REB	AST	PTS	MPG	RPG	APG	PPG	Ref.
Tim Quarterman	G	LSU	1	2016–2017	16	80	14	11	31	5.0	0.9	0.7	1.9	
Shavlik Randolph	F	Duke	2	2008–2010	13	43	19	1	22	3.3	1.5	0.1	1.7	
Zach Randolph	F/C	Michigan State	6	2001–2007	387	11,179	2,985	594	6,202	28.9	7.7	1.5	16.0	
Kelvin Ransey	G	Ohio State	2	1980–1982	158	4,849	381	1,110	2,470	30.7	2.4	7.0	15.6	
Theo Ratliff	F/C	Wyoming	3	2003–2006	150	4,048	843	82	808	27.0	5.6	0.5	5.4	
Duop Reath	C	LSU	3	2023–2026	146	1,941	380	103	905	13.3	2.6	0.7	6.2	
Cam Reddish	F	Duke	1	2022–2023	20	552	57	37	219	27.6	2.9	1.9	11.0	
Robert Reid	G/F	St. Mary's (TX)	1	1989–1990	12	85	8	8	31	7.1	0.7	0.7	2.6	
Jeremy Richardson	G/F	Delta State	1	2006–2007	1	1	0	0	0	1.0	0.0	0.0	0.0	
Isaiah Rider	G	UNLV	3	1996–1999	197	6,734	846	533	3,332	34.2	4.3	2.7	16.9	
Rick Roberson	F/C	Cincinnati	1	1973–1974	69	2,060	701	133	933	29.9	10.2	1.9	13.5	
Brian Roberts	G	Dayton	1	2015–2016	21	137	12	16	60	6.5	0.6	0.8	2.9	
Clifford Robinson^{+}	F/C	UConn	8	1989–1997	644	19,839	3,352	1,350	10,405	30.8	5.2	2.1	16.2	
James Robinson	G	Alabama	3	1993–1996	205	3,839	367	398	1,576	18.7	1.8	1.9	7.7	
Rumeal Robinson	G	Michigan	2	1995–1997	70	1,010	108	194	342	14.4	1.5	2.8	4.9	
Thomas Robinson	F	Kansas	2	2013–2015	102	1,264	440	43	454	12.4	4.3	0.4	4.5	
Sergio Rodríguez	G	(Spain) Estudiantes	3	2006–2009	219	2,715	279	627	783	12.4	1.3	2.9	3.6	
Carlos Rogers	F/C	Tennessee State	2	1997–1999	5	33	3	3	9	6.6	0.6	0.6	1.8	
Ron Rowan	G	St. John's	1	1986–1987	7	16	1	1	12	2.3	0.1	0.1	1.7	
Brandon Roy^{+}	G	Washington	5	2006–2011	321	11,439	1,374	1,494	6,107	35.6	4.3	4.7	19.0	
Delaney Rudd	G	Wake Forest	1	1992–1993	15	95	9	17	26	6.3	0.6	1.1	1.7	
Michael Ruffin	F	Tulsa	1	2008–2009	11	35	11	0	6	3.2	1.0	0.0	0.5	
Rayan Rupert	F	New Zealand Breakers	3	2023–2026	139	1,670	248	121	447	12.0	1.8	0.9	3.2	

=== S ===
All-time roster S
Player	Pos.	Pre-draft team	Yrs	Seasons	Statistics									Ref.
Player	Pos.	Pre-draft team	Yrs	Seasons	GP	MP	REB	AST	PTS	MPG	RPG	APG	PPG	Ref.
Arvydas Sabonis^{^}	C	(Lithuania) BC Žalgiris	7	1995–2001; 2002–2003	470	11,375	3,436	964	5,629	24.2	7.3	2.1	12.0	
Tom Scheffler	C	Purdue	1	1984–1985	39	268	76	11	52	6.9	1.9	0.3	1.3	
Luke Schenscher	C	Georgia Tech	1	2006–2007	11	118	25	1	19	10.7	2.3	0.1	1.7	
Dale Schlueter	C	Colorado State	3	1970–1972; 1977–1978	171	4,625	1,510	495	1,629	27.0	8.8	2.9	9.5	
Detlef Schrempf	F/C	Washington	2	1999–2001	103	2,059	410	241	678	20.0	4.0	2.3	6.6	
Shaedon Sharpe^{x}	G	Dream City Christian (AZ)	4	2022–2026	234	6,561	937	518	3,676	28.0	4.0	2.2	15.7	
Brian Shaw	G	UC Santa Barbara	1	1998–1999	1	5	1	1	0	5.0	1.0	1.0	0.0	
Mark Sibley	G	Northwestern	1	1973–1974	28	124	25	13	46	4.4	0.9	0.5	1.6	
Jerry Sichting	G	Purdue	2	1987–1989	53	714	44	92	217	13.5	0.8	1.7	4.1	
Anfernee Simons	G	IMG Academy (FL)	7	2018–2025	389	10,420	973	1,265	5,837	26.8	2.5	3.3	15.0	
Brian Skinner	F	Baylor	1	2005–2006	27	515	127	13	103	19.1	4.7	0.5	3.8	
Reggie Slater	F	Wyoming	1	1995–1996	4	20	3	0	6	5.0	0.8	0.0	1.5	
Charles Smith	G	New Mexico	2	2002–2003; 2005–2006	24	221	16	10	85	9.2	0.7	0.4	3.5	
Craig Smith	F	Boston College	1	2011–2012	47	464	110	19	156	9.9	2.3	0.4	3.3	
Dennis Smith Jr.	G	North Carolina State	1	2021–2022	37	838	88	132	206	17.2	2.4	3.6	5.6	
Greg Smith	F	Western Kentucky	4	1972–1976	195	2,969	653	222	953	15.2	3.3	1.1	4.9	
Nolan Smith	G	Duke	2	2011–2013	84	829	83	97	277	9.9	1.0	1.2	3.3	
Reggie Smith	C	TCU	2	1992–1994	66	384	120	5	99	5.8	1.8	0.1	1.5	
Steve Smith	G	Michigan State	2	1999–2001	163	5,231	585	422	2,330	32.1	3.6	2.6	14.3	
William Smith	C	Syracuse	2	1971–1973	30	491	143	20	205	16.4	4.8	0.7	6.8	
Willie Smith	G	Missouri	1	1978–1979	13	131	13	17	58	10.1	1.0	1.3	4.5	
Tony Snell	G/F	New Mexico	1	2021–2022	38	546	72	20	99	14.4	1.9	0.5	2.6	
Elmore Spencer	C	UNLV	1	1995–1996	11	37	9	1	14	3.4	0.8	0.1	1.3	
Nik Stauskas	G	Michigan	1	2018–2019	44	673	80	62	267	15.3	1.8	1.4	6.1	
Larry Steele (#15)	G/F	Kentucky	9	1971–1980	610	14,777	1,781	1,719	5,009	24.2	2.9	2.8	8.2	
Vladimir Stepania	C	(Slovenia) Olimpija	1	2003–2004	42	453	125	23	108	10.8	3.0	0.5	2.6	
Brook Steppe	G/F	Georgia Tech	1	1988–1989	27	244	32	16	103	9.0	1.2	0.6	3.8	
Damon Stoudamire	G	Arizona	8	1997–2005	529	17,497	1,859	3,018	6,745	33.1	3.5	5.7	12.8	
Bill Stricker	F	Pacific	1	1970–1971	1	2	0	0	4	2.0	0.0	0.0	4.0	
Rod Strickland	G	DePaul	5	1992–1996; 2000–2001	312	10,507	1,356	2,573	5,044	33.7	4.3	8.2^{Δ}	16.2	
Lamont Strothers	G	Christopher Newport	1	1991–1992	4	17	1	1	10	4.3	0.3	0.3	2.5	
Caleb Swanigan	F	Purdue	3	2017–2019; 2019–2020	65	599	199	50	156	9.2	3.1	0.8	2.4	

=== T to V ===
All-time roster T to V
Player	Pos.	Pre-draft team	Yrs	Seasons	Statistics									Ref.
Player	Pos.	Pre-draft team	Yrs	Seasons	GP	MP	REB	AST	PTS	MPG	RPG	APG	PPG	Ref.
Sebastian Telfair	G	Abraham Lincoln HS (NY)	2	2004–2006	136	2,971	224	471	1,103	21.8	1.6	3.5	8.1	
Ira Terrell	F/C	SMU	1	1978–1979	18	160	37	15	68	8.9	2.1	0.8	3.8	
Hasheem Thabeet	C	UConn	1	2011–2012	15	116	35	0	29	7.7	2.3	0.0	1.9	
James Thomas	F	Texas	1	2004–2005	9	112	35	4	24	12.4	3.9	0.4	2.7	
Kurt Thomas	F	TCU	1	2011–2012	53	803	188	46	160	15.2	3.5	0.9	3.0	
Bernard Thompson	G/F	Fresno State	1	1984–1985	59	535	76	52	197	9.1	1.3	0.9	3.3	
Kevin Thompson	F/C	NC State	1	1993–1994	14	58	13	3	13	4.1	0.9	0.2	0.9	
Mychal Thompson	F/C	Minnesota	7	1978–1979; 1980–1986	551	18,913	4,878	1,848	9,215	34.3	8.9	3.4	16.7	
Otis Thorpe	F/C	Providence	1	1994–1995	34	908	236	54	458	26.7	6.9	1.6	13.5	
Matisse Thybulle^{x}	G/F	Washington	4	2022–2026	132	2,888	324	175	803	21.9	2.5	1.3	6.1	
Anthony Tolliver	F/C	Creighton	2	2009–2010; 2019–2020	35	558	111	29	129	15.9	3.2	0.8	3.7	
Linton Townes	G/F	James Madison	1	1982–1983	55	516	65	31	247	9.4	1.2	0.6	4.5	
Gary Trent	F	Ohio	3	1995–1998	192	4,142	900	195	1,871	21.6	4.7	1.0	9.7	
Gary Trent Jr.	G	Duke	3	2018–2021	117	2,705	202	124	1,194	23.1	1.7	1.1	10.2	
Bill Turner	F	Akron	1	1972–1973	2	8	2	0	4	4.0	1.0	0.0	2.0	
Evan Turner	G	Ohio State	3	2016–2019	217	5,297	819	661	1,729	24.4	3.8	3.0	8.0	
Dave Twardzik (#13)	G	Old Dominion	4	1976–1980	280	6,921	611	940	2,666	24.7	2.2	3.4	9.5	
Ime Udoka	F	Portland State	1	2006–2007	75	2,144	279	112	629	28.6	3.7	1.5	8.4	
Darnell Valentine	G	Kansas	5	1981–1986	300	7,590	684	1,619	2,937	25.3	2.3	5.4	9.8	
Nick Van Exel	G	Cincinnati	1	2004–2005	53	1,619	161	227	586	30.5	3.0	4.3	11.1	
Kiki VanDeWeghe	F	UCLA	5	1984–1989	285	9,792	839	618	6,698	34.4	2.9	2.2	23.5	
Bob Verga	G	Duke	1	1973–1974	21	216	18	17	104	10.3	0.9	0.8	5.0	
Peter Verhoeven	F	Fresno State	3	1981–1984	162	2,061	411	104	661	12.7	2.5	0.6	4.1	
Noah Vonleh	F	Indiana	3	2015–2018	185	2,915	859	74	729	15.8	4.6	0.4	3.9	
Slavko Vraneš	C	(Montenegro) Budućnost	1	2003–2004	1	3	0	0	0	3.0	0.0	0.0	0.0	

=== W to Z ===
All-time roster W to Z
Player	Pos.	Pre-draft team	Yrs	Seasons	Statistics									Ref.
Player	Pos.	Pre-draft team	Yrs	Seasons	GP	MP	REB	AST	PTS	MPG	RPG	APG	PPG	Ref.
Von Wafer	G	Florida State	1	2007–2008	8	64	9	2	19	8.0	1.1	0.3	2.4	
Ish Wainright	F	Baylor	1	2023–2024	7	46	9	0	20	6.6	1.3	0.0	2.9	
Jabari Walker	F	Colorado	3	2022–2025	188	3,068	850	142	1,167	16.3	4.5	0.8	6.2	
Wally Walker	F	Virginia	2	1976–1978	75	728	125	59	384	9.7	1.7	0.8	5.1	
Gerald Wallace	F	Alabama	2	2010–2012	65	2,324	452	172	921	35.8	7.0	2.6	14.2	
Rasheed Wallace^{+}	F/C	North Carolina	8	1996–2004	544	19,309	3,797	1,102	9,119	35.5	7.0	2.0	16.8	
Bill Walton^{‡} (#32)	F/C	UCLA	4	1974–1978	209	7,033	2,822	923	3,578	33.7	13.5^{Δ}	4.4	17.1	
Kermit Washington^{+}	F/C	American	3	1979–1982	173	5,195	1,645	345	2,004	30.0	9.5	2.0	11.6	
Trendon Watford	F	LSU	2	2021–2023	110	2,051	437	211	823	18.6	4.0	1.9	7.5	
Earl Watson	G	UCLA	1	2013–2014	24	161	15	28	12	6.7	0.6	1.2	0.5	
Martell Webster	G/F	Seattle Prep. (WA)	5	2005–2010	301	6,971	934	238	2,545	23.2	3.1	0.8	8.5	
Bonzi Wells	G/F	Ball State	6	1998–2004	310	8,340	1,457	793	4,112	26.9	4.7	2.6	13.3	
Blake Wesley^{x}	G	Notre Dame	1	2025–2026	31	361	39	62	148	11.6	1.3	2.0	4.8	
Ennis Whatley	G	Alabama	2	1991–1992; 1996–1997	26	231	24	37	73	8.9	0.9	1.4	2.8	
Clinton Wheeler	G	William Paterson	1	1988–1989	20	211	19	33	49	10.6	1.0	1.7	2.5	
Hassan Whiteside	C	Marshall	1	2019–2020	67	2,008	905	78	1,040	30.0	13.5	1.2	15.5	
Sidney Wicks^{+}	F/C	UCLA	5	1971–1976	398	15,456	4,086	1,647	8,882	38.8^{Δ}	10.3	4.1	22.3	
Lenny Wilkens^{^}	G	Providence	1	1974–1975	65	1,161	120	235	420	17.9	1.8	3.6	6.5	
Alvin Williams	G	Villanova	1	1997–1998	41	864	60	83	283	21.1	1.5	2.0	6.9	
Brandon Williams	G	Arizona	1	2021–2022	24	640	74	94	309	26.7	3.1	3.9	12.9	
Buck Williams	F/C	Maryland	7	1989–1996	557	17,130	4,861	596	5,677	30.8	8.7	1.1	10.2	
Elliot Williams	G	Memphis	1	2011–2012	24	149	19	6	88	6.2	0.8	0.3	3.7	
Jeenathan Williams	G/F	Buffalo	1	2022–2023	5	127	15	10	53	25.4	3.0	2.0	10.6	
Mo Williams	G	Alabama	1	2013–2014	74	1,834	153	321	721	24.8	2.1	4.3	9.7	
Robert Williams III^{x}	F	Texas A&M	4	2023–2027	87	1,511	587	87	569	17.4	6.7	1.0	6.5	
Walt Williams	G/F	Maryland	2	1997–1999	79	1,638	225	133	706	20.7	2.8	1.7	8.9	
Nikita Wilson	F	LSU	1	1987–1988	15	54	11	3	19	3.6	0.7	0.2	1.3	
Dontonio Wingfield	F	Cincinnati	3	1995–1998	94	1,065	245	73	377	11.3	2.6	0.8	4.0	
Justise Winslow	F/G	Duke	2	2021–2023	40	1,071	214	130	314	26.8	5.4	3.3	7.9	
Dave Wohl	G	Penn	1	1972–1973	22	393	20	68	118	17.9	0.9	3.1	5.4	
Joe Wolf	F/C	North Carolina	1	1992–1993	21	156	45	5	52	7.4	2.1	0.2	2.5	
Qyntel Woods	F	Northeast Mississippi CC	2	2002–2004	115	1,007	189	58	352	8.8	1.6	0.5	3.1	
Dorell Wright	G/F	South Kent (CT)	2	2013–2015	116	1,576	302	105	562	13.6	2.6	0.9	4.8	
Yang Hansen^{x}	C	(China) Qingdao Eagles	2	2025–2027	44	312	69	22	100	7.1	1.6	0.5	2.3	
Charlie Yelverton	G/F	Fordham	1	1971–1972	69	1,227	201	81	545	17.8	2.9	1.2	7.9	
Danny Young	G	Wake Forest	4	1988–1992	223	3,376	280	515	1,008	15.1	1.3	2.3	4.5	
Perry Young	G	Virginia Tech	1	1986–1987	4	52	7	7	8	13.0	1.8	1.8	2.0	
Chris Youngblood^{x}	G	Alabama	1	2025–2026	2	11	0	1	6	5.5	0.0	0.5	3.0	
Cody Zeller	C	Indiana	1	2021–2022	27	355	125	22	140	13.1	4.6	0.8	5.2	
