= Gloria Arias Haskins =

American politician

Member of the South Carolina House of Representatives from the 22nd district
- In office January 9, 2001 – 2008
- Preceded by: Terry Haskins
- Succeeded by: Wendy Nanney

Personal details
- Born: July 11, 1956 (age 70) Bogotá, Colombia
- Party: Republican
- Spouse: Terry Haskins
- Children: David, Bryan, Hayden, and Harlan Haskins

Gloria Arias Haskins (born July 11, 1956) was a member of the South Carolina House of Representatives, first elected in a special election following the death of her husband Terry Haskins.

Haskins was born in Bogotá, Colombia to Salomon Arias and his wife Betty Bardon. She attended college at both the City University of New York and Bob Jones University.

Haskins was a member of the State House from 2000 to 2008, when she was defeated in the Republican primary by Wendy Nanney.

== Sources ==
- South Carolina legislature bio of Haskins
