= Christ Church Episcopal School =

Prep school in Greenville, South Carolina, US

Location
- 245 Cavalier Drive; Greenville, South Carolina 29607; United States
- 34°47′47″N 82°21′1″W

Information
- Other name: CCES
- Type: Private college-preparatory school
- Motto: Character. Community. Excellence. Service.
- Religious affiliation: Episcopal
- Established: 1959 (67 years ago)
- Founder: Rector and Vestry of Christ Church
- Head of school: David Padilla
- Teaching staff: 129
- Grades: K–12
- Gender: Co-educational
- Enrollment: 1,203 (2022–23)
- Student to teacher ratio: 10:1
- Campus size: 72 acres
- Colors: Blue and white
- Athletics conference: SCHSL 3A
- Nickname: Cavaliers
- Newspaper: The Cavalier
- Yearbook: The Hellenian
- Website: www.cces.org

Christ Church Episcopal School (CCES) is a K–12 private, Episcopal, college-preparatory school in Greenville, South Carolina, United States. It was established in 1959 by Christ Church, located in Greenville. In November 2025, CCES broke ground on its new "Build for the future" program, a $150 million campus development project, starting with the $30 million TIDE building.

== Notable alumni ==
- John Butler Jr., basketball player
- Knox H. White, mayor of Greenville since 1995
- William Timmons, member of the U.S. House of Representatives since 2019
- Chandler Catanzaro, NFL placekicker, Clemson University's all-time leading scorer (football), signed as free agent by Arizona Cardinals in 2014
- Edwin McCain, singer-songwriter; his songs included "I'll Be" and "I Could Not Ask for More"
- Jay Jackson (baseball), baseball player, played for San Diego Padres in 2015
- Cole Seiler, soccer player for Sacramento Republic in USL
- Tucker Eskew, served as Deputy Assistant to the President for Media Affairs and Global Communications under President George W. Bush
- Bo Lowrance, American baseball prospect drafted 40th in the 2026 MLB Draft by the Los Angeles Dodgers
