= Knox H. White =

Mayor of Greenville, South Carolina

Knox White
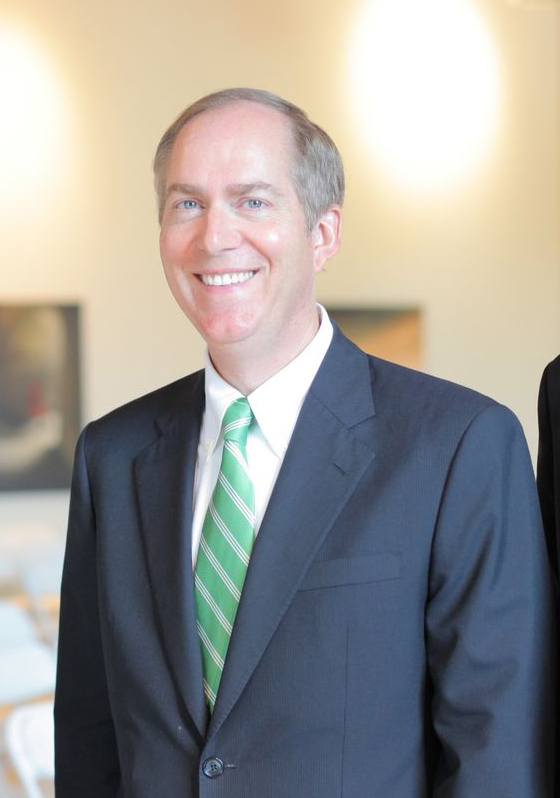

34th Mayor of Greenville, South Carolina
- Incumbent
- Assumed office December 11, 1995
- Preceded by: Bill Workman

At-large member of the Greenville City Council
- In office June 13, 1983 – 1993
- Preceded by: Bill Workman
- Succeeded by: Catherine Christophillis

Personal details
- Born: January 26, 1954 (age 72) Greenville, South Carolina, U.S.
- Party: Republican
- Spouse: Marsha White
- Children: 2
- Education: Wake Forest University, University of South Carolina School of Law
- Profession: Politician, lawyer
- Website: Campaign website

Knox Haynsworth White (born January 26, 1954) is an American politician who has served as the 34th mayor of Greenville, South Carolina, since 1995. He has been elected to eight four-year terms as mayor and is the longest-serving mayor in the city's history. Greenville is the seat of Greenville County and the state's sixth most populous city.

== Early life and career ==
Born in Greenville, White graduated from Christ Church Episcopal School and Greenville Senior High School and studied law at Wake Forest University and the University of South Carolina School of Law. He is a descendant of the Haynsworth family, a local legal dynasty.

== Public career ==
White served on the Greenville City Council from 1983 to 1993 before being elected as the city's mayor on December 11, 1995. He has been elected to eight mayoral terms, the most in the city's history. As mayor he has spearheaded projects such as Liberty Bridge and the Swamp Rabbit Trail. In September 2023, referring to a decision made with his family, White said he would not run for re-election in 2027.

== Personal life ==
White lives with his wife Marsha in Greenville; they have two children.

Political offices
| Preceded by Bill Workman | 34th Mayor of Greenville, South Carolina; 1995–present | Succeeded by Incumbent |
| Preceded by Bill Workman | At-large member of the Greenville City Council; 1983–1993 | Succeeded by Catherine Christophillis |
