= Harry B. Luthi =

American businessman and politician (1934–2019)

32nd Mayor of Greenville, South Carolina
- In office November 11, 1982 – June 13, 1983
- Preceded by: Jesse L. Helms
- Succeeded by: Bill Workman

Member of the Greenville City Council
- In office 1975 – November 11, 1982
- Preceded by: Joseph R. Bryson
- Succeeded by: Terry Haskins

Personal details
- Born: Harry Butler Luthi; April 7, 1934 Chester, South Carolina, U.S.
- Died: August 20, 2019 (aged 85) Greenville, South Carolina, U.S.
- Party: Republican
- Spouse: Jane B. Luthi
- Children: 2
- Occupation: Businessman: Luthi Outfitters

Harry Butler Luthi Sr. (April 7, 1934 – August 20, 2019) was an American businessman who served as the 32nd mayor of Greenville, South Carolina from November 1982 to June 1983. Before his time as mayor, Luthi was a member of the Greenville City Council for seven years.

== Early life ==
Luthi was born in Chester, South Carolina, in 1934 to Helen Geiger and Olin Stanton Luthi, and his family moved to Greenville when he was a child. After attending schools in the area, he graduated from Rock Hill High School in 1953. Luthi then attended the University of South Carolina before joining the United States Air Force. Luthi married Jane Byram circa 1957.

== Business ==
Luthi operated Luthi's Outfitters, a sporting goods company and pawn shop that had originated as a grocery store in 1946 by his father, Olin S. Luthi (1909–1968). Located since 1989 at 23 Butler Avenue in downtown Greenville, Luthi's closed on Christmas Eve 2013, because the building was sold to a financial institution. However, in spring 2014, under the continued management of Luthi's son, George Stanton "Stan" Luthi (1959–2020), the business returned at another location in Greenville on Laurens Road next to Half-Moon Outfitters. Known for firearms, hunting equipment, apparel and fly-fishing supplies, Luthi's attracted customers on a regional basis until closing again in December 2017.

== Politics ==
Luthi was an elected member of the Greenville City Council from 1975 to 1982. As he was the designated Mayor Pro Tem when Greenville's mayor Jesse L. Helms died, Luthi succeeded to the mayoral office on November 11, 1982, which he held until Bill Workman became mayor on June 13, 1983.

After his service as mayor of Greenville, Luthi was on the staff of Governor Carroll Campbell, who led the state from 1987 to 1995. Campbell awarded Luthi with the Order of the Palmetto for his political service to the state.

== Death ==
Luthi died on August 20, 2019. He was survived by his wife, brother, two sons, four grandchildren, and a great-granddaughter.

Political offices
Preceded by Jesse L. Helms	32nd Mayor of Greenville, South Carolina; 1982–1983	Succeeded by Bill Workman
Preceded by Dr. Joseph R. Bryson	Member of the Greenville City Council; 1975–1982	Succeeded by Terry Haskins
