= William L. Mauldin =

American politician and railroad executive from South Carolina

59th Lieutenant Governor of South Carolina
- In office December 30, 1886 – December 4, 1890
- Governor: Hugh Smith Thompson
- Preceded by: John Calhoun Sheppard
- Succeeded by: Eugene B. Gary

Member of the South Carolina Senate from Greenville County
- In office 1884–1886
- In office 1904–1912

Member of the South Carolina House of Representatives from Greenville County
- In office 1882–1884
- In office 1898–1904

7th Mayor of Greenville, South Carolina
- In office 1877–1879
- Preceded by: William C. Cleveland
- Succeeded by: Samuel A. Townes

Personal details
- Born: June 13, 1845 Greenville, South Carolina, U.S.
- Died: August 13, 1912 (aged 67) Greenville, South Carolina, U.S.
- Resting place: Springwood Cemetery
- Party: Democratic
- Spouse: Eliza Thompson Kern (m. 1871)
- Children: 6, 5 surviving him

William Lawrence Mauldin (June 13, 1845 – August 13, 1912) was a South Carolina politician and railroad executive. He was mayor of Greenville, a member of the South Carolina House of Representatives, a member of the South Carolina Senate, and the 59th lieutenant governor of South Carolina. The University of North Carolina has a collection of his papers.

== Early life ==
Born in Greenville, South Carolina, to Samuel and Caroline née McHardy Mauldin, he had a brother named Belton, and a sister, Elizabeth. Mauldin attended Furman University (1855–1860) and worked as a druggist and farmer. During the Civil War, in November 1861, he enlisted into the Confederate States Army and served in South Carolina's 6th cavalry regiment for a year; in June 1863, he reenlisted and served with the 2nd regiment through the end of the war. Mauldin married Eliza Thompson Kern in 1871.

== Political service ==
In 1877, Mauldin was elected mayor of Greenville. In 1882 he was elected to the South Carolina House of Representatives. In 1884 he became a member of the South Carolina Senate. Mauldin served two terms as lieutenant governor from December 1886 to December 1890. He cast a tie-breaking vote to approve usage of the Clemson/Calhoun estate to establish Clemson University. Mauldin was elected again to the state house in 1898 with reelection in 1902, then to the state senate again in 1904, wherein he remained a senator until retiring after the 1911–12 session.

== Legacy ==
Mauldin, South Carolina, is named for him. He brought the Greenville and Laurens Railroad, of which he was president, through the village. The original train depot was erected in 1886 and bore Mauldin's name.

== See also ==
- List of lieutenant governors of South Carolina
- List of mayors of Greenville, South Carolina
