= Chris Dudley =

American basketball player (born 1965)

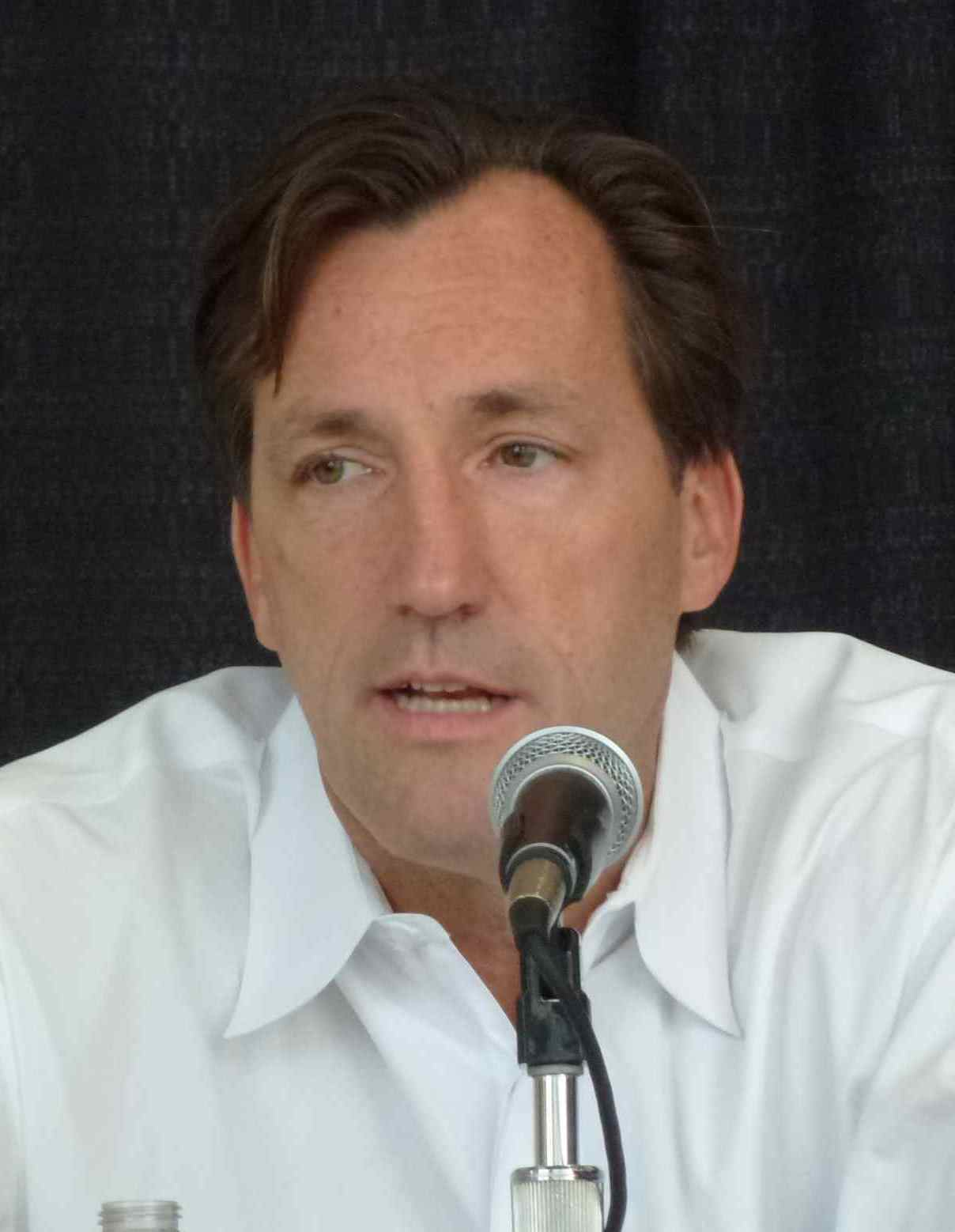
- Dudley in 2013

Personal details
- Born: Christen Guilford Dudley; February 22, 1965 (age 61) Stamford, Connecticut, U.S.
- Party: Republican
- Education: Yale University (BA)
- Basketball career

Personal information
- Listed height: 6 ft 11 in (2.11 m)
- Listed weight: 235 lb (107 kg)

Career information
- High school: Torrey Pines (San Diego, California)
- College: Yale (1983–1987)
- NBA draft: 1987: 4th round, 75th overall pick
- Drafted by: Cleveland Cavaliers
- Playing career: 1987–2003
- Position: Center
- Number: 22, 24, 52, 14

Career history
- 1987–1990: Cleveland Cavaliers
- 1990–1993: New Jersey Nets
- 1993–1997: Portland Trail Blazers
- 1997–2000: New York Knicks
- 2000–2001: Phoenix Suns
- 2001–2003: Portland Trail Blazers

Career highlights
- 3× All-Ivy League (1985–1987)

Career NBA statistics
- Points: 3,473 (3.9 ppg)
- Rebounds: 5,457 (6.2 rpg)
- Blocks: 1,027 (1.2 bpg)
- Stats at NBA.com
- Stats at Basketball Reference

Christen Guilford Dudley (born February 22, 1965) is an American former professional basketball player and politician. He played 886 games across 16 seasons in the NBA for the Cleveland Cavaliers, New Jersey Nets, Portland Trail Blazers, New York Knicks, and Phoenix Suns. In his second season with the Knicks, he played in the 1999 NBA Finals.

A journeyman center, he was known primarily for his defensive skill as a rebounder and shot blocker. He was also known as one of the worst free-throw shooters in the NBA.

In 2010, Dudley was the Republican nominee for governor of Oregon, narrowly losing to Democrat John Kitzhaber. He ran for governor again in 2026, losing the primary to Christine Drazan.

== Early life and education ==
Dudley was born in Stamford, Connecticut, the son of Elizabeth Josephine (née Kovacs, c.1941–present), a teacher, and Guilford Dudley III (c. 1932–present), a minister. His maternal grandfather, also a minister, immigrated from Hungary, and his maternal grandmother's parents were also Hungarian. His paternal grandfather was Guilford Dudley, who was U.S. ambassador to Denmark under the Nixon and Ford presidential administrations.

Dudley played high school basketball at Torrey Pines High School in San Diego, California. He was diagnosed with type 1 diabetes at the age of 16. Like his parents, grandfather, and uncle, Dudley attended Yale University. At Yale he played NCAA basketball for the Bulldogs from 1983 to 1987, was a member of Timothy Dwight College, and earned a degree in political science and economics.

== NBA career ==
=== Cleveland Cavaliers (1987–1990) ===
Dudley began playing with the Cleveland Cavaliers during the 1987–88 NBA season. During his rookie season, he played in 55 of 82 games, averaging three points per game.

=== New Jersey Nets (1990–1993) ===
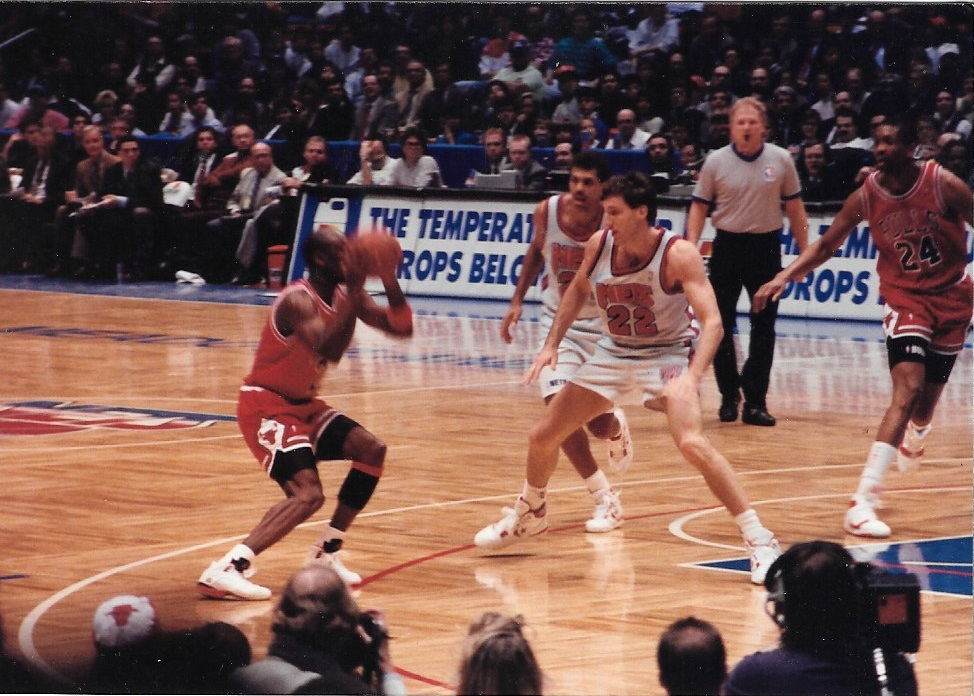
Chris Dudley, playing for the New Jersey Nets, squares off with Michael Jordan of the Chicago Bulls on January 23, 1991

During the 1989–1990 season, he was traded to the New Jersey Nets for a 1991 second-round pick and a 1993 second-round pick. He played three years with the Nets, including the 1990–91 season, in which he produced a career-best 7.1 points per game in 61 contests. The 1991–1992 season marked the first time he played all 82 games in a season, a feat he would replicate three seasons later with the Blazers. In the 1992–1993 season, he was a bench contributor as the Nets went to their second playoff spot in two years.

=== Portland Trail Blazers (1993–1997) ===
During the 1993 offseason, Dudley signed a seven-year, $11-million free agent contract with the Portland Trail Blazers, but he suffered a broken ankle on December 10 in the Blazers' victory over the Los Angeles Lakers, ending his season after just six games. He returned for all 82 games in 1994-95 and missed only three games in the next two seasons.

=== New York Knicks (1997–2000) ===
After playing 161 games for the Blazers between 1995 and 1997, Dudley was traded to the New York Knicks in a three-team deal with the Toronto Raptors, sending John Wallace from New York to Toronto, a 1998 first-round pick from New York to Portland, a 2007 second-round pick from Toronto to Portland and a 2000 first-round pick from Toronto to New York. During his stint with the Knicks, Dudley primarily backed up Patrick Ewing for three seasons. On March 28, 1999, in a game against the Los Angeles Lakers, Shaquille O'Neal made a dunk while guarded by Dudley, whom O'Neal subsequently physically thrust himself upon and shoved to the ground. Dudley responded by angrily throwing the ball at O'Neal. Both men received technical fouls for their actions. The next month, on April 16, he grabbed his 5,000th NBA rebound during a game between the Knicks and the Detroit Pistons.

In 1999, Dudley reached the NBA Finals for the only time in his career. The 1999 Knicks, the first 8th seeded team in NBA history to reach the Finals, lost to the San Antonio Spurs, four games to one. Dudley's Finals averages were 1.2 points, 3.8 rebounds, 0.6 blocks, and 2.8 fouls across 15.6 minutes per game.

=== Phoenix Suns (2000–2001) ===
After his stint with the Knicks, Dudley was traded to the Phoenix Suns for Luc Longley, participating in 53 games in the 2000–01 season. During this season, he averaged 1.4 points, 3.5 rebounds, and 2.1 fouls in 11.6 minutes per game.

On July 18, 2001, Dudley, along with superstar point guard Jason Kidd, was traded back to the New Jersey Nets in exchange for Soumaila Samake, Johnny Newman, and Stephon Marbury. He was waived by the Nets the following month.

=== Return to Portland (2001–2003) ===
Dudley returned to the Trail Blazers in 2001 as a free agent. In his first season back, he played 43 games (two starts), with averages of 1.1 points and 1.9 rebounds per game, alongside 40% field goal shooting. Dudley retired after playing 11 total minutes in three games during the 2002–03 season.

== Player profile ==
In a career total of 886 NBA games, Dudley scored 3473 points (3.9 points per game), had 375 assists (0.4 assists per game), blocked 1027 shots (1.2 blocks per game) and had 5457 rebounds (6.2 rebounds per game).

In 1990, Dudley missed 13 consecutive free throws, setting an NBA record. In 1989, he set the record for most free throws missed in a single trip to the foul line, missing five consecutive free throws after the opposing team committed three lane violations.

== NBA Honors ==
He was the recipient of the NBA's J. Walter Kennedy Citizenship Award in 1996, and USA Today's Most Caring Athlete Award in 1997.

== Post-NBA ==
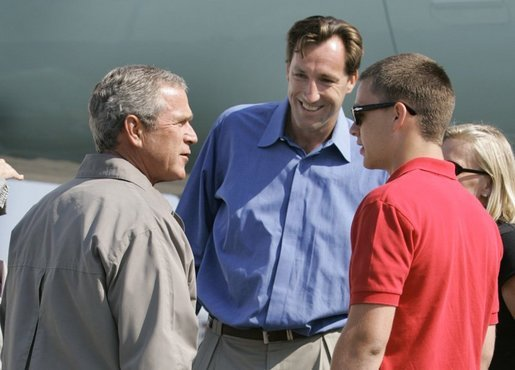
Dudley meeting with President George W. Bush, 2004

In 1994, he created the Chris Dudley Foundation, an Oregon-based group intended to improve the lives of diabetic children. In the summer of 1996 the Foundation started a basketball camp for children with diabetes. He received an NBA award as well as other community awards for founding the organization. From 2005 to 2007, he was a volunteer assistant coach for the Lake Oswego High School boys' basketball team, where he mentored UCLA-bound star Kevin Love.

In early 2006, Dudley became vice president of M Financial Wealth Management. Since October 2008, he has been a wealth management partner with Filigree Advisors.

=== Political career ===
==== 2010 Oregon gubernatorial campaign ====
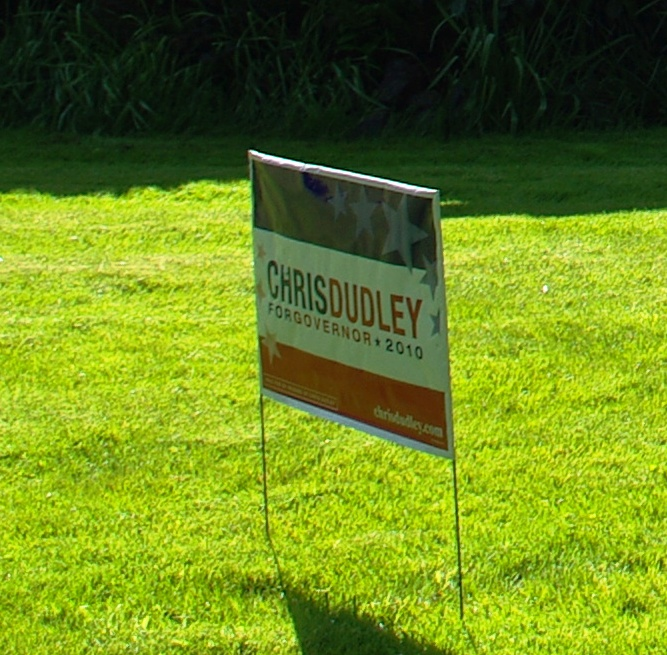
Lawn sign in Hillsboro during the primary campaign

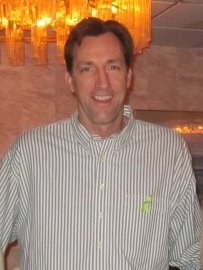
Dudley at the 2010 Dorchester Conference in Seaside, Oregon

In the summer of 2009, Dudley, a Lake Oswego resident, was encouraged by the Republican Party to consider a run for the U.S. House of Representatives. Dudley declined to run for Congress, preferring to spend more time in the state. On October 11, 2009, The Oregonian reported that Dudley was considering entering the Republican primary for Oregon governor in 2010. In November 2009 he formed a campaign committee and raised roughly $340,000 by early December of the same year. Dudley formally announced his entry into the race on December 16. On March 6, 2010, The Oregonian reported Dudley had raised over $1 million, aided by a $50,000 donation from Nike co-founder Phil Knight.

In May 2010, Dudley won 39% of the vote in a crowded Republican primary to win the GOP nomination, and prepared to face former governor John Kitzhaber in the November general election. On September 29, 2010, The Register-Guard reported that Chris Dudley's campaign had received $5.6 million, more than twice what was raised by the Kitzhaber campaign. His primary sponsors included the national Republican Governors Association, in-state timber companies, industry trade groups, and Portland area business executives. Nike chairman and co-founder Phil Knight gave Dudley's campaign $400,000.

Kitzhaber beat Dudley 49.29%–47.76%, or by just over 22,000 votes. While Dudley carried the majority of Oregon's counties, he was unable to overcome a deficit of over 120,000 votes in Multnomah County, the most populous in the state. Dudley raised and spent a total of $10.3 million, the largest amount ever in an Oregon governor's campaign. Kitzhaber raised and spent $7.4 million. The combined $17.7 million was the most ever spent on an Oregon political race until it was surpassed by the 2018 gubernatorial election.

==== 2026 Oregon gubernatorial campaign ====
On November 1, 2025 at the Reagan Dinner, Dudley hinted that he was considering another run for governor. On January 26, 2026, Dudley officially announced his intention to seek the Republican nomination for Oregon governor again. In the May 2026 Oregon primaries, Dudley lost the Republican gubernatorial nomination to Christine Drazan.

== Personal life ==
Dudley and his wife, also named Chris, have two sons and one daughter. In April 2012, Dudley announced that his family was moving from Lake Oswego, Oregon, to San Diego, California so that his wife could pursue a business opportunity. He also indicated that his political career was likely over. Dudley closed his Oregon campaign committee, which could have been used for future races, in April 2014.

During his playing career, Dudley donated $300,000 to a non-profit organization to help pay the cost of college tuition for a class of fourth-graders at Vernon Elementary School in Portland.

Two of Dudley's children have been associated with Division I college basketball. His son Charles was on the roster of the 2017–18 Bryant Bulldogs, but never played. Dudley's daughter Emma was a reserve forward for the Utah State Aggies from 2018–2020. During 29 career games over two seasons, she averaged 0.9 points and 1.4 rebounds across 6.3 minutes per game.

=== Alleged altercation ===
In October 2018, it was reported that Dudley and now Supreme Court Justice Brett Kavanaugh were in a bar fight in September 1985. According to a police report, Dudley smashed his drinking glass into the head of a man who allegedly resembled Ali Campbell of UB40 after he tried to hit Kavanaugh, who had just thrown his beer at the man. Through an article published in The Guardian, Campbell wrote that whomever Dudley and Kavanaugh fought was not him, and that he was not at the bar that night.

== Career statistics ==
=== NBA ===
Legend
GP	Games played	GS	Games started	MPG	Minutes per game
FG%	Field goal percentage	3P%	3-point field goal percentage	FT%	Free throw percentage
RPG	Rebounds per game	APG	Assists per game	SPG	Steals per game
BPG	Blocks per game	PPG	Points per game	**Bold**	Career high
*	Led the league

==== Regular season ====
Year	Team	GP	GS	MPG	FG%	3P%	FT%	RPG	APG	SPG	BPG	PPG
1987–88	Cleveland	55	1	9.3	**.474**	–	**.563**	2.6	.4	.2	.3	3.1
1988–89	Cleveland	61	2	8.9	.435	.000	.364	2.6	.3	.1	.4	3.0
1989–90	Cleveland	37	22	18.5	.389	–	.338	5.5	.5	.5	1.1	5.0
1989–90	New Jersey	27	8	24.9	.441	–	.305	8.1	.7	**.8**	1.1	6.1
1990–91	New Jersey	61	25	25.6	.408	–	.534	8.4	.6	.6	**2.5**	**7.1**
1991–92	New Jersey	**82**	21	23.2	.403	–	.468	9.0	.7	.5	2.2	5.6
1992–93	New Jersey	71	16	19.7	.353	–	.518	7.2	.2	.2	1.5	3.5
1993–94	Portland	6	3	14.3	.240	–	.500	4.0	**.8**	.7	.5	2.3
1994–95	Portland	**82***	**82***	**27.4**	.406	.000	.464	**9.3**	.4	.5	1.5	5.5
1995–96	Portland	80	21	24.1	.453	.000	.510	9.0	.5	.5	1.3	5.1
1996–97	Portland	81	14	22.7	.430	–	.474	7.3	.5	.5	1.2	3.9
1997–98	New York	51	22	16.8	.406	–	.446	5.4	.4	.3	1.0	3.1
1998–99	New York	46	16	14.9	.440	–	.475	4.2	.2	.3	.8	2.5
1999–00	New York	47	3	9.8	.343	–	.333	2.9	.1	.1	.4	1.2
2000–01	Phoenix	53	33	11.6	.397	–	.389	3.5	.3	.3	.5	1.4
2001–02	Portland	43	2	7.6	.400	.000	.533	1.9	.3	.1	.5	1.1
2002–03	Portland	3	0	3.7	.000	–	–	.7	.0	.0	.0	.0
Career		886	331	18.4	.412	.000	.458	6.2	.4	.4	1.2	3.9

==== Playoffs ====
Year	Team	GP	GS	MPG	FG%	3P%	FT%	RPG	APG	SPG	BPG	PPG
1988	Cleveland	4	0	6.0	.500	–	.500	1.5	.5	.0	.0	1.3
1989	Cleveland	1	0	4.0	.000	–	–	.0	.0	.0	.0	.0
1992	New Jersey	4	0	19.3	.357	–	.500	6.5	**.8**	.5	**2.5**	**3.5**
1994	Portland	4	2	**20.3**	.400	–	.500	3.8	.0	**1.5**	.0	2.3
1995	Portland	3	3	19.7	**.667**	–	.375	5.0	.3	.0	.3	2.3
1996	Portland	5	0	18.4	.385	–	.667	5.4	.2	.4	.4	2.8
1997	Portland	4	0	17.3	.455	–	.333	**7.0**	**.8**	.5	1.3	3.0
1998	New York	6	3	8.8	.333	–	.500	3.0	.0	.2	.3	1.3
1999	New York	**18**	**6**	16.3	.421	–	.393	4.6	.3	.5	.4	2.4
2000	New York	5	2	8.6	.500	–	**1.000**	2.4	.4	.2	.2	.8
2001	Phoenix	3	0	8.7	.500	–	–	2.3	.0	.3	.3	.7
2002	Portland	2	0	1.5	.000	–	–	.5	.0	.0	.0	.0
Career		59	16	18.4	.407	–	.455	4.0	.3	.4	.5	2.0

=== College ===
Year	Team	GP	GS	MPG	FG%	3P%	FT%	RPG	APG	SPG	BPG	PPG
1983–84	Yale	**26**	19	30.2	.464		.467	5.1	.4	.3	.7	4.7
1984–85	Yale	**26**	**26**	30.6	.446		.533	10.2	.8	**.7**	2.0	12.6
1985–86	Yale	**26**	**26**	29.1	.539		.482	9.8	**1.0**	.3	1.4	16.2
1986–87	Yale	24	24	**31.2**	**.569**	–	**.542**	**13.3**	.6	.6	**2.8**	**17.6**
Career		102	95	27.4	.513	–	.512	9.5	.7	.5	1.7	12.6

== Electoral history ==
=== 2010 ===
2010 Oregon Republican gubernatorial primary
Party	Candidate	Votes	%
Republican	Chris Dudley	122,855	39.11
Republican	Allen Alley	99,753	31.76
Republican	John Lim	47,339	15.07
Republican	Bill Sizemore	23,522	7.49
Republican	William Ames Curtright	12,497	3.98
Republican	Rex O. Watkins	3,060	0.97
Republican	Write-ins	2,001	0.64
Republican	Clark Colvin	1,206	0.38
Republican	Darren Karr	1,127	0.36
Republican	Bob Forthan	727	0.23
Total votes		314,087	100.00

2010 Oregon gubernatorial election
Party	Candidate	Votes	%	±%
Democratic	John Kitzhaber	716,525	49.29%	−1.43%
Republican	Chris Dudley	694,287	47.76%	+5.01%
Constitution	Greg Kord	20,475	1.41%	−2.23%
Libertarian	Wes Wagner	19,048	1.31%	+0.09%
Write-ins		3,213	0.22%	
Majority		22,238	1.53%	−6.45%
Turnout		1,453,548		
Democratic hold		Swing		

=== 2026 ===
Results by county Drazan: 30–40%; 40–50%; 50–60%; Diehl: 30–40%; 40–50%; 50–60%

2026 Oregon Republican gubernatorial primary
Party	Candidate	Votes	%
Republican	Christine Drazan	172,474	40.53
Republican	Ed Diehl	140,458	33.01
Republican	Chris Dudley	71,929	16.90
Republican	David Medina	21,742	5.11
Republican	Danielle Bethell	9,629	2.26
Republican	Brad Peters	1,827	0.43
Republican	Paul Romero	1,615	0.38
Republican	Kyle Duyck	1,562	0.37
Republican	Robert Neuman	680	0.16
Republican	Martin Ward	539	0.13
Republican	Hope Dalrymple	534	0.13
Republican	DeAngelo Turner	377	0.09
Republican	Wen Waddell	321	0.08
Republican	Tim Youker	248	0.06
Republican	Write-in	1,622	0.38
Total votes		425,557	100.00

== See also ==
- Portland Trail Blazers all-time roster

Party political offices
Preceded by Ron Saxton	Republican nominee for Governor of Oregon; 2010	Succeeded by Dennis Richardson
