= Wendy Nanney =

American politician

Member of the South Carolina House of Representatives from the 22nd district
- In office 2008 – November 14, 2016
- Preceded by: Gloria Arias Haskins
- Succeeded by: Jason Elliott

Personal details
- Party: Republican
- Education: Bob Jones University (BA)

Wendy Kay Taylor Nanney (born April 16, 1965) was a Republican member of the South Carolina House of Representatives (2008-2016) representing District 22, a portion of Greenville County. She currently serves as Practice Manager at Piedmont Women's Center, an anti-abortion, pregnancy support organization.

== Biography ==
Born in Greenville, the daughter of Bob Jones University staff members Bob and Barb Taylor, Nanney graduated with a business degree from BJU in 1987. She worked as a staff assistant in Washington for the Senate Foreign Relations Committee when it was headed by Senator Jesse Helms. Nanney served as chairman of the Greenville County Republican Party, 2006–07, and treasurer of the Upstate Republican Women's Club, 2003–06.

First elected to the state house in 2008, after defeating Gloria Arias Haskins in the Republican primary, Nanney worked for passage of a 24-hour abortion bill that requires women seeking abortion to wait 24 hours after they have arrived at the clinic.

In 2014 Nanney sponsored the "Pain-Capable Unborn Child Protection Act" which would prohibit abortions on unborn babies after 20 weeks gestation.

In 2015 Nanney opposed removal of the Confederate flag from the war memorial on the South Carolina capitol grounds.

In 2010 Nanney was the credit manager for Interfilm Holdings, a leading PET film converter and distributor for industrial markets. She and her husband, Timothy Lee Nanney, Greenville County Register of Deeds, have five children. She is a member of Morningside Baptist Church in Greenville.
