= 1986 United States House of Representatives elections in South Carolina =

- November 4, 1986

All 6 South Carolina seats to the United States House of Representatives
	Majority party	Minority party
Party	Democratic	Republican
Last election	3	3
Seats won	4	2
Seat change	▲1	▼1
District results
Democratic
50–60%
60–70%
70–80%
>90%
Republican
50–60%

The 1986 United States House of Representatives elections in South Carolina were held on November 4, 1986, to select six Representatives for two-year terms from the state of South Carolina. The primary elections for the Democrats and the Republicans were held on June 10 and the runoff elections were held two weeks later on June 24. All four incumbents who ran were re-elected and the Democrats picked up one of the two open seats vacated by the Republicans. The composition of the state delegation after the elections was four Democrats and two Republicans.

== 1st congressional district ==
Incumbent Republican Congressman Thomas F. Hartnett of the 1st congressional district, in office since 1981, chose to not seek re-election and instead made an unsuccessful run for lieutenant governor. The open seat was won by Republican state senator Arthur Ravenel, Jr.

=== Democratic primary ===
Democratic primary
Candidate	Votes	%
Jimmy Stuckey	17,615	41.7
Mendel Jackson Davis	17,417	41.2
Fraiser	3,980	9.4
Garrett	3,261	7.7

Democratic primary runoff
Candidate	Votes	%	±%
Jimmy Stuckey	18,994	61.4	+19.7
Mendel Jackson Davis	11,956	38.6	+2.6

=== Republican primary ===
Republican primary
Candidate	Votes	%
Arthur Ravenel, Jr.	8,487	56.5
Jones	4,964	33.1
Vanderhoff	1,561	10.4

=== General election results ===
South Carolina's 1st congressional district election results, 1986
Party	Candidate	Votes	%	±%
Republican	Arthur Ravenel, Jr.	59,969	52.0	−9.7
Democratic	Jimmy Stuckey	55,262	48.0	+9.7
No party	Write-Ins	11	0.0	0.0
Majority		4,707	4.0	−19.4
Turnout		115,242		
Republican hold				

== 2nd congressional district ==
Incumbent Republican Congressman Floyd Spence of the 2nd congressional district, in office since 1971, defeated Democratic challenger Fred Zeigler.

=== Democratic primary ===
Democratic primary
Candidate	Votes	%
Fred Zeigler	36,450	81.4
Fairchild	8,350	18.6

=== General election results ===
South Carolina's 2nd congressional district election results, 1986
Party	Candidate	Votes	%	±%
Republican	Floyd Spence (incumbent)	73,455	53.6	−8.5
Democratic	Fred Zeigler	63,592	46.4	+9.7
No party	Write-Ins	5	0.0	0.0
Majority		9,863	7.2	−18.2
Turnout		137,052		
Republican hold				

== 3rd congressional district ==
Incumbent Democratic Congressman Butler Derrick of the 3rd congressional district, in office since 1975, defeated Republican challenger Richard Dickson.

=== General election results ===
South Carolina's 3rd congressional district election results, 1986
Party	Candidate	Votes	%	±%
Democratic	Butler Derrick (incumbent)	79,109	68.4	+10.0
Republican	Richard Dickson	36,495	31.5	−9.1
No party	Write-Ins	79	0.1	+0.1
Majority		42,614	36.9	+19.1
Turnout		115,683		
Democratic hold				

== 4th congressional district ==
Incumbent Republican Congressman Carroll Campbell of the 4th congressional district, in office since 1979, chose to not seek re-election and instead made a successful run for governor. The open seat was won by Democratic state senator Liz J. Patterson.

=== Republican primary ===
Republican primary
Candidate	Votes	%
William Workman III	8,487	51.8
Marchant	4,964	30.3
Adams	1,561	9.5
Ridgon	1,371	8.4

=== General election results ===
South Carolina's 4th congressional district election results, 1986
Party	Candidate	Votes	%	±%
Democratic	Liz J. Patterson	67,012	51.4	+16.2
Republican	William Workman III	61,648	47.3	−16.6
American	Bob Wilson	1,644	1.2	+1.2
No party	Write-Ins	103	0.1	+0.1
Majority		5,364	4.1	−24.6
Turnout		130,407		
Democratic gain from Republican				

== 5th congressional district ==
Incumbent Democratic Congressman John M. Spratt, Jr. of the 5th congressional district, in office since 1983, was unopposed in his bid for re-election.

=== General election results ===
South Carolina's 5th congressional district election results, 1986
Party	Candidate	Votes	%	±%
Democratic	John M. Spratt, Jr. (incumbent)	95,859	99.6	+7.8
No party	Write-Ins	388	0.4	+0.4
Majority		95,471	99.2	+11.7
Turnout		96,247		
Democratic hold				

== 6th congressional district ==
Incumbent Democratic Congressman Robin Tallon of the 6th congressional district, in office since 1983, defeated Republican challenger Robbie Cunningham.

=== Democratic primary ===
Democratic primary
Candidate	Votes	%
Robin Tallon	61,924	89.8
Luther Lighty, Jr.	7,066	10.2

=== General election results ===
South Carolina's 6th congressional district election results, 1986
Party	Candidate	Votes	%	±%
Democratic	Robin Tallon (incumbent)	92,398	75.5	+15.6
Republican	Robbie Cunningham	29,922	24.5	−14.3
No party	Write-Ins	23	0.0	0.0
Majority		62,476	51.0	+29.9
Turnout		122,343		
Democratic hold				

== See also ==
- 1986 United States House of Representatives elections
- 1986 United States Senate election in South Carolina
- 1986 South Carolina gubernatorial election
- South Carolina's congressional districts
