= List of mayors of Greenville, South Carolina =

This is a list of mayors of Greenville, South Carolina, a city in the northwest (Upstate) part of the U.S. state of South Carolina. Before the city's office of Mayor was established, a similar role was that of Intendant. Mayors began office when the General Assembly amended the town charter in February 1869 to establish Greenville as a city. Officials elected to multiple consecutive terms have the number of terms noted after their names.

== Intendants ==
Order	Person number	Intendants of Greenville, South Carolina		
Order	Person number	Intendant	Served	Notes
1	1	Thomas M. Cox	1850–1851	also served in 1864
		unknown	1852–1854	
2	2	H. Lee Thruston (2)	1855–1857	
		unknown	1858	
3	3	Alexander McBee	1859–1860	also served 1862–1863; son of Vardry McBee
		unknown	1861	
4	3	Alexander McBee	1862–1863	also served 1859–1860; lived at Brushy Creek
5	1	Thomas M. Cox	1864	also served 1850–1851
		unknown	1865	
6	4	R.D. Long	1866–1867	
7	5	W.R. Jones	1868	also served as Greenville's first mayor

== Mayors ==
Years per term	Order	Person number	Mayors of Greenville, South Carolina		
Years per term	Order	Person number	Mayor	Served	Notes
1	1	1	W.R. Jones	1869–1870	served previously as intendant
1	2	2	Thomas C. Gower	1870–1871	
1	3	3	James P. Moore	1871–1872	
1	4	4	H.P. Hammett	1872–1873	
1	5	5	Samuel Stradley	1873–1874	
2	6	6	William C. Cleveland	1875–1877	terms began a two-year length
2	7	7	William L. Mauldin	1877–1879	later served in the state house, senate, and as lieutenant governor
2	8	8	Samuel A. Townes (3)	1879–1885	also served 1887–1889
2	9	9	E.F.S. Rowley	1885–1887	also served 1889–1891
2	10	8	Samuel A. Townes	1887–1889	also served 1879–1885
2	11	9	E.F.S. Rowley	1889–1891	also served 1885–1887
2	12	10	W.W. Gilreath	1891–1893	
2	13	11	James T. Williams (4)	1893–1901	
2	14	12	C.C. Jones	1901–1903	
2	15	13	G. Heyward Mahon (3)	1903–1909	
2	16	14	John B. Marshall	1909–1911	also served 1913–1915
2	17	15	Henry Briggs	1911–1913	
2	18	14	John B. Marshall	1913–1915	also served 1909–1911
2	19	16	Charles S. Webb	1915–1917	
2	20	17	H.C. Harvley (3)	1917–1923	
2	21	18	Richard F. Watson (2)	1923–1927	
2	22	19	Alvin H. Dean	1927–1929	
2	23	20	A.C. Mann (2)	1929–1933	father of politician James Mann
2	24	21	John McHardy Mauldin (2)	1933–1937	son of Mayor William L. Mauldin
2	25	22	C. Fred McCullough (5)	1937–1947	
2	26	23	J. Kenneth Cass (7)	1947–1961	
2	27	24	David G. Traxler Sr. (4)	1961–1969	
2	28	25	R. Cooper White Jr.	1969–1971	grandson of Mayor H.C. Harvley
4	29	26	Max Heller (2)	1971–1979	terms began a 4-year length; appointed to State Development Board
4	30	27	James H. Simkins	1979	completed Heller's second term
4	31	28	Jesse L. Helms	1979–1982	died in office
4	32	29	Harry B. Luthi	1982–1983	completed Helms's term
4	33	30	Bill Workman (3)	1983–1995	
4	34	31	Knox H. White (8)	1995–present	longest-serving mayor
