= John Butler Jr. =

American basketball player (born 2002)

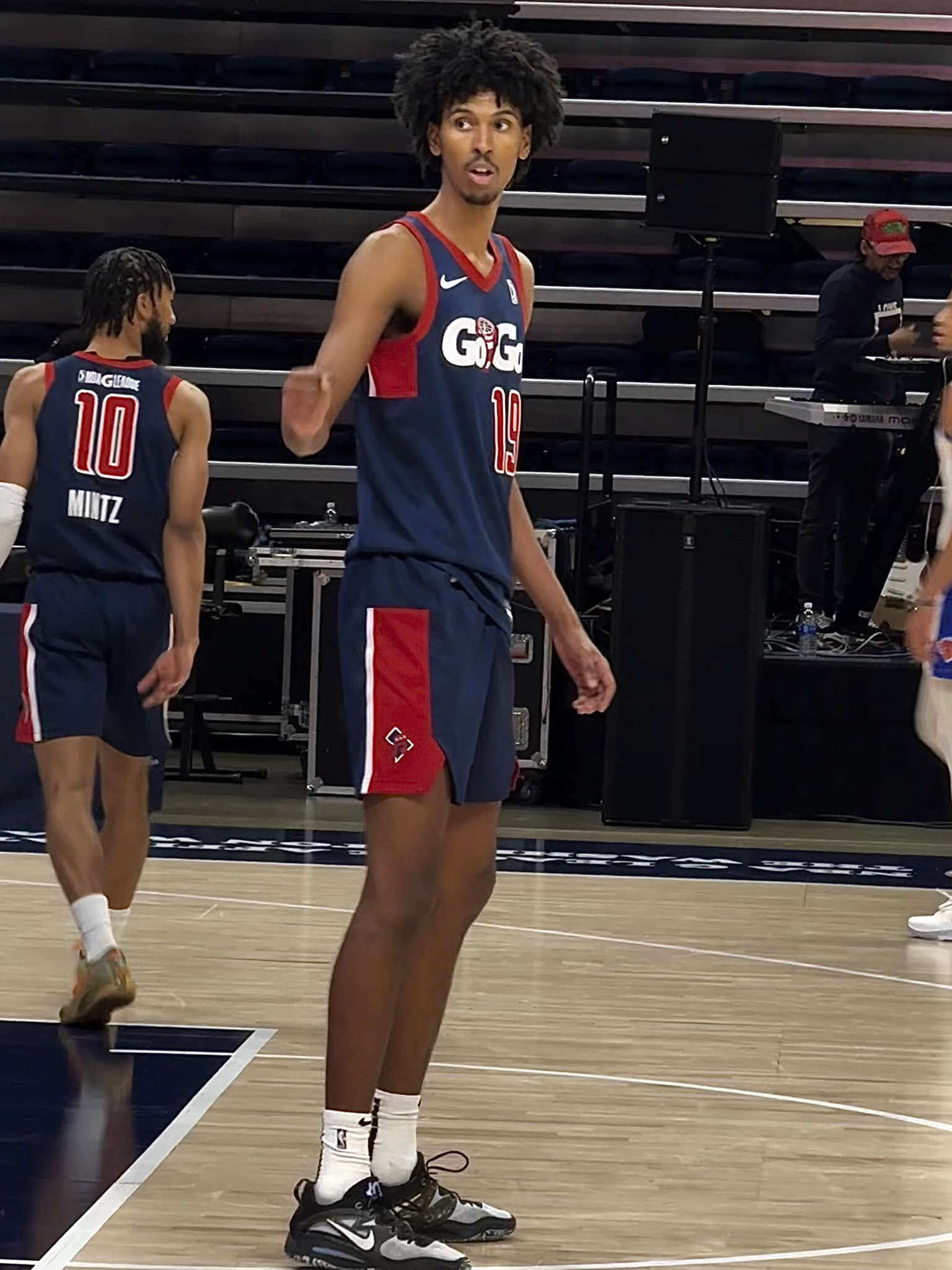
- Butler Jr. with the Capital City Go-Go in 2023

No. 27 – Wisconsin Herd
- Position: Power forward / center
- League: NBA G League

Personal information
- Born: December 4, 2002 (age 23) Greenville, South Carolina, U.S.
- Listed height: 7 ft 0 in (2.13 m)
- Listed weight: 220 lb (100 kg)

Career information
- High school: Christ Church Episcopal (Greenville, South Carolina)
- College: Florida State (2021–2022)
- NBA draft: 2022: undrafted
- Playing career: 2022–present

Career history
- 2022–2023: Portland Trail Blazers
- 2023: →Stockton Kings
- 2023–2025: Capital City Go-Go
- 2025–present: Wisconsin Herd
- Stats at NBA.com
- Stats at Basketball Reference

John Erik Butler Jr. (born December 4, 2002) is an American professional basketball player for the Wisconsin Herd of the NBA G League. He played college basketball for the Florida State Seminoles.

== High school career ==
Butler played basketball for Christ Church Episcopal School in Greenville, South Carolina, where he was coached by his father, John Sr., and was teammates with his younger brother, Jordan. As a senior, he averaged 20.1 points, 8.5 rebounds and 2.9 blocks per game, earning Upstate Player of the Year honors from The Greenville News. Butler was named Class 2A Player of the Year and led his team to the state championship. A four-star recruit, he committed to playing college basketball for Florida State over offers from Georgia Tech, Alabama, South Carolina, Vanderbilt and Wake Forest.

== College career ==
On March 2, 2022, Butler recorded a career-high 16 points, eight rebounds and four blocks in a 74–70 win against Notre Dame. As a freshman, he averaged 5.9 points, 3.2 rebounds and 1.2 blocks per game, shooting 39.3 percent from three-point range. Butler declared for the 2022 NBA draft and opted to forgo his remaining college eligibility.

== Professional career ==
=== Portland Trail Blazers (2022–2023) ===
After going undrafted in the 2022 NBA draft, Butler joined the New Orleans Pelicans for NBA Summer League play. On October 3, 2022, he was signed to a two-way contract by the Pelicans for the 22–23 season. However, he was waived on October 10.

On October 20, 2022, Butler signed a two-way contract with the Portland Trail Blazers, and on February 26, 2023, he was assigned to the Stockton Kings by the Trail Blazers.

On July 6, 2023, Butler signed another two-way contract with the Blazers, but was waived on October 21.

=== Capital City Go-Go (2023–2025) ===
On October 23, 2023, Butler signed a two-way contract with the Washington Wizards. However, he was waived on December 8, after appearing in nine games with the Capital City Go-Go, Washington's NBA G League affiliate. On December 10, he rejoined Capital City.

On October 13, 2024, re-signed with the Wizards, but was waived six days later. On October 28, he rejoined the Go-Go.

=== Wisconsin Herd (2025–2026) ===
On March 6, 2025, Butler was traded to the Wisconsin Herd for the returning rights of Darryl Morsell, a 2026 G-League Draft first round, and a second round pick. On November 7, Butler was named to the Wisconsin Herd's opening night roster.

On September 4, 2026, Butler signed a non-guaranteed, training camp contract with the Milwaukee Bucks.

== Career statistics ==
Legend
GP	Games played	GS	Games started	MPG	Minutes per game
FG%	Field goal percentage	3P%	3-point field goal percentage	FT%	Free throw percentage
RPG	Rebounds per game	APG	Assists per game	SPG	Steals per game
BPG	Blocks per game	PPG	Points per game	**Bold**	Career high

=== NBA ===
Year	Team	GP	GS	MPG	FG%	3P%	FT%	RPG	APG	SPG	BPG	PPG
2022–23	Portland	19	1	11.6	.321	.229	.750	.9	.6	.4	.5	2.4
Career		19	1	11.6	.321	.229	.750	.9	.6	.4	.5	2.4

=== College ===
Year	Team	GP	GS	MPG	FG%	3P%	FT%	RPG	APG	SPG	BPG	PPG
2021–22	Florida State	31	24	19.0	.416	.393	.440	3.2	.7	.4	1.2	5.9

== Personal life ==
Butler's mother, Casie, played college basketball for South Carolina. His father, John Sr., serves as head basketball coach at Christ Church Episcopal School.
