= Bill Workman =

American businessman and politician (1940–2019)

33rd Mayor of Greenville, South Carolina
- In office June 13, 1983 – December 11, 1995
- Preceded by: Harry B. Luthi
- Succeeded by: Knox H. White

President of the Municipal Association of South Carolina
- In office 1994–1995
- Preceded by: Stephen M. Creech
- Succeeded by: Lessie B. Price

At-large member of the Greenville City Council
- In office 1981 – June 13, 1983
- Preceded by: Clifford Gaddy Jr.
- Succeeded by: Knox H. White

Personal details
- Born: William Douglas Workman III; July 3, 1940; Charleston, South Carolina, U.S.
- Died: May 12, 2019 (aged 78); Walterboro, South Carolina, U.S.
- Resting place: Live Oak Cemetery, Walterboro
- Political party: Republican
- Spouse(s): Marcia Mae Moorhead (m. 1966; div. 1996) Patti Gage Fishburne (m. 1996)
- Children: 2 (3 stepchildren)
- Parent: W. D. Workman Jr. (father)
- Education: The Citadel
- Occupation: Businessman

Military service
- Branch/service: United States Army
- Rank: Lieutenant colonel

William Douglas Workman III (July 3, 1940 – May 12, 2019) was an American businessman and politician who served as the mayor of Greenville, South Carolina from 1983 to 1995. Greenville is the seat of Greenville County, the state's most populous county, at the center of the Upstate South Carolina region.

Originally from the southern part of the state, Workman began work in journalism before entering politics. He worked in Governor James B. Edwards' administration in the latter 1970s, after which he was honored with the Order of the Palmetto. Workman was a member of the Greenville city council for two years before his election as mayor.

During his three terms as mayor, Workman coordinated redevelopment of the city's Main Street, helped build international cultural ties, oversaw construction of a baseball stadium, helped bring multiple corporate headquarters to the region, and negotiated funding partnerships for a performing arts center and a multi-purpose arena.

After elected service, he continued work as vice president for a major regional gas utility company, and advised community leadership gatherings in South Carolina and beyond. Workman returned to the state's Lowcountry in 2006 and held leadership roles in various economic development organizations. He was honored as a South Carolina Economic Ambassador in 2014.

== Early life and career ==
Born in Charleston, South Carolina, Workman grew up in Columbia and Walterboro. His father, William Jr., worked for various state newspapers and Newsweek magazine. His mother, Rhea, taught English at Columbia College. Workman graduated from The Citadel in 1961. He served two years with the U.S. Army before continuing in the Army Reserve, later retiring as a lieutenant colonel.

Workman was a news reporter in Charleston (News and Courier) and then Greenville (The Greenville News) in the late 1960s. Greenville Technical College hired him in 1971 as dean of health services. Workman was an executive assistant for South Carolina governor James B. Edwards from 1975 to 1978, and was given the state's highest honor, the Order of the Palmetto, by him in 1978. From 1978 to 1994, Workman was employed by Fluor Daniel in industrial relations and project development.

== Public career ==
Workman served for two years on the Greenville City Council before being elected as the city's mayor in 1983. As mayor-elect in June 1983, he told city officials, "The primary thing we have to focus on is economic development." Early in his first term, Workman and the Greenville area's chamber of commerce decided to recruit corporate headquarters to the area. The chamber had a plan in place by late 1983, and French tire manufacturer Michelin decided to move its North America headquarters to Greenville in 1984, taking advantage of its location between Atlanta and Charlotte. Tens of other companies also moved to Greenville in following years, including pulp and paper business Bowater in 1992.

Workman ran unsuccessfully to represent South Carolina's 4th congressional district in 1986. During the campaign, he was endorsed by Reagan administration HUD Secretary Samuel Pierce, who "stressed Workman's experience with former [governor Edwards] ... and the Greenville City Council." Workman lost to Liz J. Patterson in a close 49–51% election, and attributed the outcome to home support for his challenger in Spartanburg County and Reagan's veto of a textile bill important to parts of the district. In an unusual situation, the candidates' fathers had been opponents in 1962 for a U.S. Senate seat. It was the state's most costly race of 1986, in which Workman's campaign spent over $590 million.

As mayor, Workman is credited with helping to build cultural ties to Greenville and establish a sistership with Bergamo, Italy; he visited the northern Italian city in 1989 to discuss various exchanges. Under his leadership, the city acted as developer for the 45,000-square-foot (4,200 m^{2}) West End Market project, which later brought an arts and entertainment district. A city councilman credited Workman with getting corporate support for public–private partnerships including the Peace Center performing arts center. He oversaw construction of the $2.7 million Greenville Municipal Stadium after getting local banks to buy city revenue bonds, continued Main Street redevelopment, and was involved with partnership negotiations for development of the Bon Secours Wellness Arena.

In 1989, Workman urged a group of the state's city and county leaders to look beyond their annual budgets, in anticipation of eventual economic downturns and to control the gap between upper and lower class. In 1990, he urged a Union revitalization group (about 45 miles or 72 km to the east) to accept more risk and build water–sewer lines along its new highways in anticipation of future growth. In 1993, at a Beaufort economic summit in an industry recruitment context, Workman said, "If someone is looking at your community, they want to see how you treat yourselves, then they can see how you will treat them."

== After mayor ==
In the 1995 campaign for mayor, challenger Knox White criticized Workman's twelve years on the job as making him less effective, and pledged that he would introduce a term limit for the office. White defeated Workman 3,569–2,234 in the primary, and then more-than-doubled Workman's duration as mayor after winning the general election. After losing reelection, Workman continued work as a vice president of Piedmont Natural Gas and took leadership roles in various organizations to promote local economic development.

In 1997, Workman offered advice in a round table discussion about industrial recruitment in Oak Ridge, Tennessee. In 1998, he was the keynote speaker at a gathering of business and community leaders in Durham, North Carolina, who sought to revive their downtown commerce and activity. Workman warned against repeating Greenville's mistakes during growth, and emphasized the need for a strategic plan rather than a tactical one to attract businesses.

In 2004, U.S. Senator Lindsey Graham acknowledged Workman's accomplishments in attracting new industries to his city and region: "There is no doubt Greenville is now one of the Southeast region's premier cities for business. Bill Workman played a leading role in this evolution and has made many noteworthy contributions to Greenville and upstate South Carolina." Workman retired from Piedmont in February 2004 after 10 years of service, with Mike Forrester replacing him as vice president of the energy company's South Carolina operations.

In March 2004, Workman received a "Vision Award" from the Appalachian Regional Commission. In the latter 1970s, while working for Governor Edwards, he had a key role in getting the Upstate region added to the multi-state Appalachia area, with annual funding from the commission going toward economic stimulants such as a network of state technical colleges. Workman also held top leadership positions in the state's Appalachian Health Council from 1972 to 1975. The award is given for "exemplary service and leadership" and covered regional planning and development contributions throughout Workman's career.

Workman moved to South Carolina's Lowcountry region in 2006, where he was Bluffton's town manager for three years. He had a part in laying off a Bluffton police officer in 2009 and was named in a subsequent age discrimination lawsuit. Judge Bruce Howe Hendricks cited statements made by Workman in recommending non-dismissal of the federal suit, which ended with a cash settlement from the town in 2012 without admission of liability.

== Personal life and later years ==
Workman and his first wife, Marcia, were married in 1966 and had two sons; the couple divorced in January 1996. With his 1996 marriage to second wife Patti, Workman gained three stepdaughters.

In 2014, he was honored in the state capital as a "South Carolina Economic Ambassador" for Colleton County.

Workman died on May 12, 2019, in Walterboro.

Political offices
Preceded by Harry B. Luthi	33rd Mayor of Greenville, South Carolina; 1983–1995	Succeeded by Knox H. White
Preceded by Clifford Gaddy, Jr.	At-large member of the Greenville City Council; 1981–1983	Succeeded by Knox H. White
Preceded by Stephen M. Creech (Sumter)	President of the Municipal Association of South Carolina; 1994–1995	Succeeded by Lessie B. Price (Aiken)
Preceded by Joshua Martin	3rd Town Manager of Bluffton, South Carolina; 2006–2009	Succeeded by Anthony Barrett
