= Thomas Haynesworth =

American man wrongfully convicted of crimes

Thomas Haynesworth (born March 21, 1965) is a resident of Richmond, Virginia, who served 27 years in state prison as a result of four wrongful convictions for crimes for which he was exonerated in 2011.

Haynesworth was arrested in Richmond at the age of 18 in 1984 after a woman identified him as her attacker. He was convicted of four violent rapes in the East End of the city. He was sentenced to a total of 84 years in prison. Haynesworth maintained his innocence throughout the years of incarceration. Based on DNA and other evidence, the crimes for which he was convicted are now believed to have been committed by a neighbor who resembled Haynesworth.

In 2009, new state laws and procedures allowed for DNA testing, which was not available in the 1980s. Semen collected from the first attack implicated the neighbor and ruled out Haynesworth. After reviewing this and other evidence, local prosecutors brought the case to the office of Virginia Attorney General Ken Cuccinelli, who began advocating for Haynesworth. His convictions in two of the cases were vacated, and he was released from prison on parole in March 2011. Haynesworth was fully exonerated in the remaining two cases in December 2011.

The case, which The Washington Post called "one of the state's most extraordinary legal cases", used DNA testing and new state laws that allowed convicts to present new evidence in cases to prove innocence. The General Assembly passed a bill in 2012 to pay Haynesworth compensation for his wrongful convictions and lengthy incarceration, amounting to a total of $1 million in a lump sum payment, two types of annuities, and tuition at a community college. The legislators wanted to help him make his way in his life.

== Description of attacks ==
Over the course of four weeks in the winter of 1984, five women were assaulted in a series of attacks in and around the East End neighborhood of Richmond, Virginia. On January 3, 1984, a 20-year-old woman was raped at knifepoint near the daycare center where she worked. On January 21, an 18-year-old woman was sodomized at knifepoint near a grocery store. On January 27, a woman was approached outside her home by a man demanding money and sex; she locked herself inside and called the police while the man fled. On January 30, an 18-year-old woman was abducted, raped, and sodomized in nearby Henrico County, within blocks of the other attacks. On February 1, a 19-year-old woman was abducted at gunpoint outside her home, but the attacker fled when the woman's dog began barking.

== Arrest and prosecution ==
Given the locations and nature of the attacks, and the description of the attacker, police believed one man was responsible. On February 5, 1984, the victim of the January 27 attack saw Haynesworth, a young, African-American man, walking near a grocery store (where his mother had sent him to buy groceries) and, believing him to be her attacker, called the police. A police officer pulled up next to Haynesworth, and asked if he would allow a woman whose house was broken into to look at him. The woman identified him as her attacker and he was arrested. Haynesworth was identified in a police lineup by all four other women.

Eyewitness identifications have been shown in studies to be notoriously unreliable. Other studies have shown that eyewitnesses are more likely to misidentify someone of another race than someone of their own race. (Note: "The DNA exoneration cases where the false conviction is established with near certainty show that eyewitness evidence has been largely responsible for false conviction in more than 70% of cases (www.innocenceproj.org).")

Haynesworth was tried in four separate rape cases in 1984. (Charges were dropped in the January 27 attack, despite the victim of that attack having been the first victim to identify him.) He maintained his innocence, saying that authorities had the wrong man. Haynesworth was convicted in three of the four trials, and sentenced to 10 years, 36 years, and 28 years in prison, respectively, for a total of 84 years in prison.

Although Haynesworth was in custody, rapes continued to occur in the same neighborhood. At least ten young women reported they were attacked by a young black man who referred to himself as the "Black Ninja". On December 19, 1984, Leon Davis, who resembled Haynesworth, had the same blood type, and lived nearby, was arrested and charged with a dozen rapes during the nine months after Haynesworth's arrest. After Davis was arrested, the rapes stopped. Davis was later convicted of several rape charges and sentenced to multiple life terms in jail.

Haynesworth continued to maintain his innocence. He rejected advice from fellow inmates, who told him to apologize for the purported crimes when he appeared before the parole board, in order to increase his chances of an early release. While imprisoned, Haynesworth earned his GED and studied auto mechanics, welding, and masonry. He wrote letters to local newspapers, law students, and 60 Minutes, pleading for help to appeal his case.

== Push for exoneration ==
=== Background of new laws and procedures ===
In 2001, Virginia's General Assembly passed a law allowing inmates to ask for DNA tests at any time. Numerous persons were serving time who had not been able to use DNA in their trials. In 2002, voters passed a referendum to allow DNA evidence to be presented by convicted felons after their convictions - and after the 21-day period following conviction that was previously allowed in the law.

A 2004 law expanded the post-conviction rules to allow courts to consider also new non-DNA evidence, including new testimony. (While serving in the Virginia Senate, Ken Cuccinelli, who was State Attorney General when Haynesworth was seeking exoneration, had voted for an earlier version of this law, but it failed.) In 2005, five wrongfully convicted men were exonerated in Virginia. Governor Mark Warner ordered the State Attorney General's Office to conduct a sweeping review of thousands of cases from between 1973 and 1988, Haynesworth's among them.

=== New evidence and first exoneration ===
Under this review, semen collected from the January 3, 1984 rape was tested for DNA evidence, a forensic technology that was not available in 1984. The test cleared Haynesworth and implicated Davis. (DNA for another case in which Haynesworth was suspected, but not charged, was tested and it also implicated Davis.) After the test, the Mid-Atlantic Innocence Project began advocating for Haynesworth. On September 18, 2009, the Supreme Court of Virginia issued a writ of innocence to Haynesworth for the charges in the January 3, 1984 case.

=== Cuccinelli begins advocating ===
No physical evidence could be found for the other two cases, so the state prosecutors gave Haynesworth two polygraph tests, which he passed. In 2010, Commonwealth's attorneys Michael Herring and Wade Kizer of Richmond and Henrico counties, respectively, brought the case to the attention of Virginia Attorney General Ken Cuccinelli, a former state senator.

Cuccinelli began examining the case, covering a wall in his office with evidence. Cuccinelli later said, "It was a complex decision, but it wasn't a hard decision." He also said, "It's hard to describe how painful it is to me that somebody would suffer what he has."

== Release ==
Following the Virginia Supreme Court writ of innocence and Haynesworth's petition for writs in the other two cases, Virginia Governor Bob McDonnell asked the state's parole board to review Haynesworth's case. It approved him for parole. On the morning of March 21, 2011 (his 46th birthday), Haynesworth was released from prison on parole. Guards awakened him around 1 am ET to inform him of his release, and other inmates gave him a birthday card to take home. He walked out of the prison, Greensville Correctional Center in Jarratt, Virginia, around 11 am, carrying all his belongings (a television and a single garbage bag with the rest of his belongings). He was welcomed by his mother and sisters, along with other family members. His mother, Dolores Haynesworth, said, "He's home. It's still hard to believe. I'm holding him, but it's still hard to believe." Haynesworth said, "I always believed this day would come," and added, "I didn't think it would take 27 years."

Despite his release, Haynesworth was dogged by the convictions for the two remaining cases; as new physical evidence was unavailable, these remained on his record. As a result, he was still listed on the state's sex offender registry. Because of this status, Haynesworth had to wear an electronic ankle monitor, be subject to curfews, inform authorities in order to move from one home to another, and had to request permission to visit his young nieces. Knowing how hard it would be for Haynesworth to find a job until he was fully exonerated, Cuccinelli hired him to work as a clerk in his office. Haynesworth said Cuccinelli was "an extraordinary guy" and that as "a total stranger [he] put it on the line for me." Cuccinelli had also invited Haynesworth to his office, where the State Attorney General personally apologized to him for the miscarriage of justice in his case.

== Push for writs of innocence in the Court of Appeals ==
Cuccinelli, the local prosecutors, and Haynesworth's lawyers petitioned the Court of Appeals of Virginia to grant a writ of innocence in the remaining two cases. Despite the unanimous agreement of the prosecutors and Cuccinelli (who, as attorney general, was the state's chief law enforcement officer), the court seemingly interpreted the new laws allowing for Haynesworth to make his case more strictly than the General Assembly intended, according to The New York Times. The court asked for further briefs from the parties to discuss whether the exonerating evidence should be "conclusive".

Cuccinelli argued that requiring extra briefs raised the standard of proof too high, beyond what was intended by the General Assembly. He said the only form of conclusive proof is DNA. In a pointed statement, he wrote that, as the state had disposed of the DNA evidence in these two cases, "it seems paradoxical to demand 'conclusive' evidence from Haynesworth when the commonwealth has deprived him of the opportunity to produce such evidence." Appearing in person before the court, Cuccinelli argued passionately for Haynesworth's exoneration, saying, "This case has kept many prosecutors from going to bed at night. It's a real wake-up call. Not to say things need to be changed, but that this could happen." Shawn Armbrust of the Mid-Atlantic Innocence Project said, "To find Haynesworth guilty, a jury would have to accept the coincidence that there were two guys in the same neighborhood who looked alike and were committing the same crimes."

== Full exoneration ==
On December 6, 2011, in a 6-4 decision, the Court of Appeals granted writs of innocence in the remaining two rape cases, fully exonerating Haynesworth.

Appearing alongside Cuccinelli and his attorneys at an emotional news conference following the ruling, Haynesworth said,

It's a blessing. There are a lot of people behind the scenes who believed in me. Twenty-seven years, I never gave up. I kept pushing. I ain't give up hope. I am very happy. Me and my family can finally put this behind us, and I can go on with my life. And I can finally vote. … I'm just so happy. You just want your name restored. You want to prove to them that they made a mistake.

(Note: Convicted felons are prohibited from voting in Virginia, even after they serve their sentences and complete parole or probation.)

Cuccinelli said,

Today marks the end of an unimaginable nightmare for Thomas Haynesworth. For 27 years in prison, he always maintained his innocence and continuously displayed tremendous dignity and grace, steadfastly believing that justice would one day be served. Today, justice was in fact served, and Thomas Haynesworth was finally granted the total freedom he so deserves. … An attorney general's job is not convictions when it comes to law enforcement. It's justice. Today we got justice. … I have never experienced the pure joy of today's outcome.

Cuccinelli also said of Haynesworth, "His composure, dignity and faithfulness are an absolute witness to me. I am an admirer here."

Haynesworth continued working in Cuccinelli's office, and planned to open his own auto repair business. As of December 2012, he was still working in Cuccinelli's office.

=== Compensation ===
In its 2012 session, the General Assembly passed a bill granting $1,075,178 in compensation to Haynesworth for wrongful imprisonment, and it was signed by Gov. Bob McDonnell on April 5, 2012. Under the legislation, Haynesworth was to receive an initial lump sum of $215,036, and $759,232 to be paid in an annuity over 15 years. The legislature also granted an additional $100,910 for an annuity to provide Haynesworth with a monthly income of $1,516 when he reaches age 60, and provided him with tuition of up to $10,000 in the Virginia community college system.

Haynesworth said the compensation was "not what it could have been" but that he was "content" with it. The bill's state Senate sponsor, Henry L. Marsh, said "No amount of money can make up for the experience that Mr. Haynesworth suffered, but I think this bill is a good result in terms of helping him restore his life." Cuccinelli said, "Although we wish that the amount of money could have been greater, we also know that no amount can make up for those 27 lost years. We pray that this will allow Thomas a new beginning to pursue the dreams he has been waiting almost three decades to fulfill." Gov. McDonnell said, "Now, as Mr. Haynesworth begins the next chapter in his life, it is morally right for Virginia to provide him with a means to financial security and the ability to move on with his future. This restitution will help ensure that Mr. Haynesworth is able to build upon his freedom and return to society in a successful way."

=== Legal ramifications ===
Haynesworth was only the second convict of nearly 200 such cases to be exonerated without the support of DNA evidence. The majority of the court said "a rational trier of fact" could not conclude beyond a reasonable doubt that Haynesworth was the perpetrator. But, the dissenting judges said sufficient evidence still existed in the victims' original eyewitness identifications of Haynesworth to convict him. They said that the law did not allow for writs of innocence in such cases, rendering them "powerless to act".

Peter Neufeld of the Innocence Project said,

It's much harder when you don't have the smoking gun of DNA. This is the very first time in the history of the Innocence Project where the attorney general and two local prosecutors joined us in seeking an exoneration, yet it nevertheless took nine months, two trips to the Court of Appeals and six judges to ensure the relief that was obvious to everyone.

The case caused law enforcement and criminal justice officials to re-assess the reliability of eyewitness identifications. Neufeld of the Innocence Project said the dissenting judges "were still somewhat hung up on the fact that a couple women made these misidentifications," and said, "What that tells us is that we still have a long way to go for people to appreciate how often eyewitnesses are mistaken."

Cuccinelli said the Haynesworth case proved that the new state laws allowing non-biological evidence to be presented could work, but that the laws needed to be reworked to make it less difficult to win an exoneration. He said, "to have to prove by clear and convincing evidence that no reasonable juror would find beyond a reasonable doubt that someone committed a crime is mind-numbing in the extreme." He said he understood that the standard needed to be high to avoid endless appeals, but that courts were too unwilling to rehear cases after the conviction. He also said that he did not necessarily think that the agreement of an attorney general and prosecutors should automatically lead to an exoneration, but that

If there's good enough reason for everybody to agree, then you'd think your chances of getting over the legal hurdles would be pretty good. He added, "It needs to be a high bar, but the process by which it's handled and the hoops you have to get through, I think, are worthy of reconsideration."

Cuccinelli said that the case was a reminder to him and to prosecutors that "the system isn't perfect, and neither are we."

== See also ==
- List of wrongful convictions in the United States
