= Haynsworth =

Haynsworth is a surname. Notable people with this name include:

- Clement Haynsworth (1912–1989), American circuit judge and Supreme Court nominee, namesake of C.F. Haynsworth Federal Building and United States Courthouse
- Emilie Virginia Haynsworth (1916–1985), American mathematician, namesake of Haynsworth inertia additivity formula
- G. Edward Haynsworth (1922–2012), Episcopalian bishop in Nicaragua and South Carolina
- Holt Haynsworth, cinematographer for 2008 documentary miniseries Sex: The Revolution
- Matthew E. Haynsworth, acting mayor of Tampa, Florida in 1881
- William M. Haynsworth Jr. (1901–1942), American naval officer, namesake of USS Haynsworth
