= 1994 United States House of Representatives elections =

House elections for the 104th U.S. Congress

- November 8, 1994

All 435 seats in the United States House of Representatives 218 seats needed for a majority
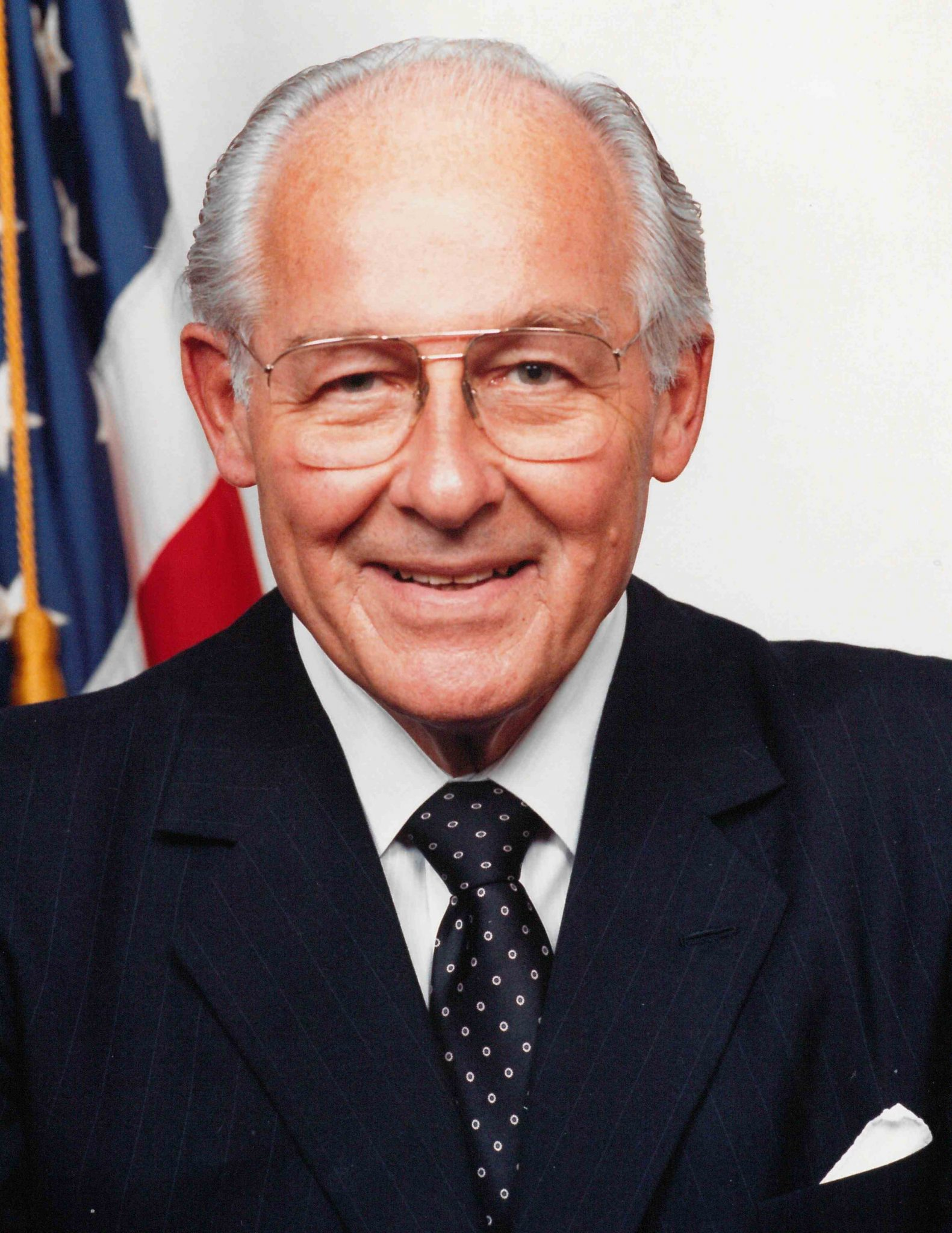

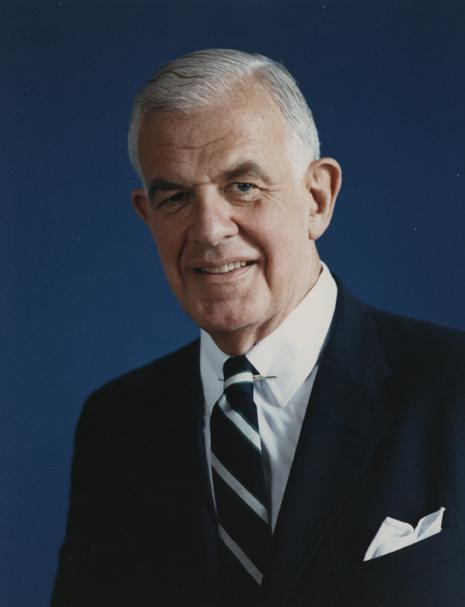
	Majority party	Minority party
Leader	Bob Michel (retired)	Tom Foley (lost re-election)
Party	Republican	Democratic
Leader since	January 3, 1981	June 6, 1989
Leader's seat	Illinois 18th	Washington 5th
Last election	176 seats	258 seats
Seats won	230	204 (Note: Starting with the 104th Congress, Independent Bernie Sanders began caucusing with House Democrats, thereby giving a margin of 230–205.)
Seat change	▲54	▼54
Popular vote	36,325,809	31,542,823
Percentage	51.5%	44.7%
Swing	▲6.4	▼5.4
	Third party
Party	Independent
Last election	1 seat
Seats won	1
Seat change	Steady
Popular vote	497,403
Percentage	0.7%
Swing	▼0.6
- Results: Democratic hold Democratic gain Republican hold Republican gain Independent hold
Speaker before election
Tom Foley
Democratic
Elected Speaker
Newt Gingrich
Republican

The 1994 United States House of Representatives elections were held on November 8, 1994, to elect U.S. Representatives to serve in the 104th United States Congress. They occurred in the middle of President Bill Clinton's first term. In what was known as the Republican Revolution, a 54-seat swing in membership from the Democratic Party to the Republican Party resulted in the latter gaining a majority of seats in the House of Representatives for the first time since 1952. It was also the largest seat gain for the party since 1946, and the largest for either party since 1948, and characterized a political realignment in American politics.

Democrats had run the House since 1955, and for all but four years (1947–49 and 1953–55) since 1931. In 1994, the Republican Party ran against President Clinton's proposed healthcare reform. The Republicans argued that Clinton had abandoned the centrist New Democrat platform he campaigned on during the 1992 presidential election and reverted to big government solutions. The GOP ran on Newt Gingrich's Contract with America.

The incumbent speaker of the House, Democrat Tom Foley, lost re-election in his district, becoming the first sitting speaker to be defeated since Galusha Grow in 1863. Other major upsets included the defeat of powerful long-serving representatives such as Ways and Means chairman Dan Rostenkowski and Judiciary chairman Jack Brooks. In total, 34 incumbents, all Democrats, were defeated. Republicans also won a number of seats held by retiring Democrats. No Republican incumbents lost re-election, but Democrats won four open Republican-held seats. NFL Hall of Famer Steve Largent was elected in Oklahoma and singer Sonny Bono was elected in California.

Robert H. Michel, the Republican minority leader, chose to retire due to pressure from the more conservative members of the Republican caucus. Dick Cheney had served as the Minority Whip and Michel supported having Edward Rell Madigan replace him, but the position was instead given to Gingrich, who would later be selected to become speaker. The incumbent Democratic majority leader, Dick Gephardt, became minority leader. The new House leadership, under the Republicans, promised to bring a dozen legislative proposals to a vote in the first 100 days of the session, although the U.S. Senate did not always follow suit.

In a significant political realignment, the South underwent a dramatic transformation. Before the election, House Democrats outnumbered House Republicans in the South. Afterwards, with the Republicans having picked up a total of 19 Southern seats, they were able to outnumber Democrats in the South for the first time since Reconstruction. The Republicans would go on to remain the majority party of the House for the following 12 years, until the 2006 elections. The Republicans have won at least 200 seats in almost every House election since, with the exceptions of 2008, 2018, and 2026. As of 2026, this is the last congressional election in which Republicans won any House seats in Massachusetts.

== Voting patterns ==
=== Republican gains, 1992–1994 ===
Category	% Rep. 1992	% Rep. 1994	% shift to Republican 1992–94	size of group % /all
Southern whites	53	65	12	24
White men	51	62	11	40
White "born again" Christian	66	76	10	20
Whites 30–44 years old	51	61	10	28
Independents	46	56	10	24
White Protestants	57	66	9	41
Whites 60 and over	46	55	9	26
Whites	50	58	8	79
Men 30–44 years old	49	57	8	17
Republicans	85	93	8	35
Income under $15,000	31	38	7	11
Conservatives	72	79	7	34
Men 60 and over	44	51	7	12
Whites 45–59	52	59	7	23
Men	48	54	6	49
High school education	42	48	6	22
Some college	47	53	6	32
White women	49	55	6	40
Unmarried men	42	48	6	14
Country on "wrong track"	--	67		59
Disapprove of Clinton	--	82		49
1992 Perot voters	--	67		12

Source: Data from exit-poll surveys by Voter Research and Surveys and Mitofsky International published in The New York Times, November 13, 1994, p. 24.

=== Religious right ===
Evangelicals were an important group within the electorate and a significant voting block in the Republican party. The national exit poll by Mitofsky International showed 27% of all voters identified themselves as a born-again or evangelical Christians, up from 18% in 1988 and 24% in 1992. Republican House candidates outpolled Democrats among white evangelicals by a massive 52 points, 76% to 24%.

According to a survey sponsored by the Christian Coalition, 33 percent of the 1994 voters were "religious conservatives," up from 24 percent in 1992 and 18 percent in 1988 (CQ Weekly Report), November 19, 1994, p. 3364; in the 1994 exit poll, 38 percent identified themselves as "conservatives," compared with 30 percent in 1992.

Party identification and ideology by selected religious groups 1994

	Party identification		Political ideology		
Religion	Democratic	Republican	Liberal	Moderate	Conservative
White evangelical	20	54	6	33	61
Highly religious	34	39	15	48	37
Secular	44	27	31	47	22
Jewish	57	13	36	50	14
All voters	41	35	18	47	35

Source: Mitofsky International exit poll in Klinkner, p. 121.

== Overall results ==
Ross Perot's organization United We Stand America issued a report card for each member of Congress. 169 Democrats, 2 Republicans, and one independent received a failing grade. Perot went on Larry King Live in October and called for the Democrats to lose their majority in the U.S. House. He endorsed the Republican opponent of Speaker Tom Foley.

↓
204	1	230
Democratic	I	Republican

Party	Seats			Seat percentage	Vote percentage	Popular vote
Party	1992	Elected	Net change	Seat percentage	Vote percentage	Popular vote
Republican	176	230	▲54	52.9%	51.5%	36,325,809
Democratic	258	204	▼54	46.9%	44.7%	31,542,823
Independent	1	1	Steady	0.2%	0.7%	497,403
Libertarian	0	0	Steady	0.0%	0.6%	415,944
Conservative	0	0	Steady	0.0%	0.4%	302,735
U.S. Taxpayers'	0	0	Steady	0.0%	0.1%	90,793
Right to Life	0	0	Steady	0.0%	0.1%	70,526
Peace and Freedom	0	0	Steady	0.0%	0.1%	63,450
Natural Law	0	0	Steady	0.0%	0.1%	62,556
Green Party	0	0	Steady	0.0%	0.1%	40,177
Others	0	0	Steady	0.0%	1.5%	1,081,432
Totals	435	435	Steady	100.0%	100.0%	70,493,648

Source: Election Statistics - Office of the Clerk

Popular vote
Republican	51.53%
Democratic	44.75%
Libertarian	0.59%
Others	3.13%

House seats
Republican	52.87%
Democratic	46.90%
Others	0.23%

=== Maps ===
Popular vote by states

House results shaded by winners share of vote

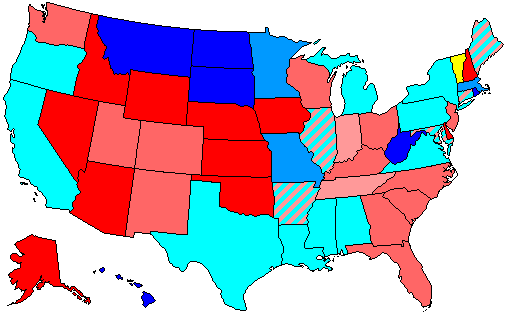
House seats by party holding plurality in state

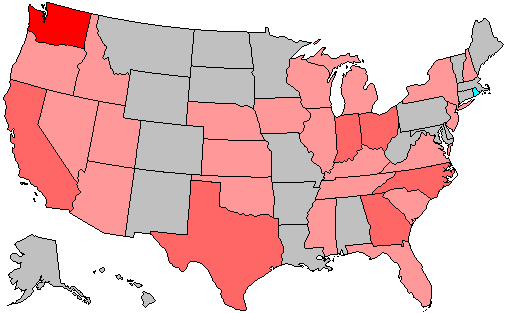
Net changes to U.S. House seats after the 1994 elections

== Incumbents defeated ==
=== In primary elections ===
==== Democrats ====
- Oklahoma 2: Mike Synar lost to Virgil R. Cooper, who later lost the general election to Republican Tom Coburn.
- Pennsylvania 2: Lucien E. Blackwell lost to Chaka Fattah, who later won the general election.
- Texas 18: Craig Washington lost to Sheila Jackson Lee, who later won the general election.

==== Republicans ====
- New York 4: David A. Levy lost to Dan Frisa, who later won the general election.

=== In the general elections ===
==== Democrats ====
Thirty-four incumbent Democrats (including 16 "freshmen") were defeated in 1994. Democrats from Washington lost the most seats (5).

- Arizona 6: Karan English
- California 1: Dan Hamburg
- California 19: Richard H. Lehman
- California 49: Lynn Schenk
- Georgia 7: George Darden
- Georgia 10: Don Johnson Jr.
- Idaho 1: Larry LaRocco
- Illinois 5: Dan Rostenkowski
- Indiana 4: Jill Long
- Indiana 8: Frank McCloskey
- Iowa 4: Neal Edward Smith
- Kansas 4: Dan Glickman
- Kentucky 1: Thomas Barlow
- Nebraska 2: Peter Hoagland
- Nevada 1: James Bilbray
- New Hampshire 2: Richard Swett
- New Jersey 8: Herb Klein
- New York 1: George J. Hochbrueckner
- North Carolina 3: Martin Lancaster
- North Carolina 4: David Price
- Ohio 1: David S. Mann
- Ohio 6: Ted Strickland
- Ohio 19: Eric Fingerhut
- Pennsylvania 13: Marjorie Margolies
- Texas 9: Jack Brooks
- Texas 13: Bill Sarpalius
- Utah 2: Karen Shepherd
- Virginia 11: Leslie Byrne
- Washington 1: Maria Cantwell
- Washington 3: Jolene Unsoeld
- Washington 4: Jay Inslee
- Washington 5: Tom Foley
- Washington 9: Mike Kreidler
- Wisconsin 1: Peter W. Barca

==== Republicans ====
- None

== Open seats that changed parties ==
=== Democratic seats won by Republicans ===
22 open seats previously held by Democrats were won by Republicans.

- Arizona 1: Matt Salmon
- Florida 1: Joe Scarborough
- Florida 15: Dave Weldon
- Georgia 8: Saxby Chambliss
- Illinois 11: Jerry Weller
- Indiana 2: David M. McIntosh
- Kansas 2: Sam Brownback
- Maine 1: James B. Longley Jr.
- Michigan 8: Dick Chrysler
- Minnesota 1: Gil Gutknecht
- Mississippi 1: Roger Wicker
- New Jersey 2: Frank LoBiondo
- North Carolina 2: David Funderburk
- North Carolina 5: Richard Burr
- Ohio 18: Bob Ney
- Oklahoma 2: Tom Coburn
- Oklahoma 4: J. C. Watts
- Oregon 5: Jim Bunn
- South Carolina 3: Lindsey Graham
- Tennessee 3: Zach Wamp
- Tennessee 4: Van Hilleary
- Washington 2: Jack Metcalf

=== Republican seats won by Democrats ===
Democrats won four open seats previously held by Republicans.

- Maine 2: John Baldacci
- Minnesota 6: Bill Luther
- Pennsylvania 18: Mike Doyle
- Rhode Island 1: Patrick J. Kennedy

== Open seats that parties held ==
=== Democratic seats held ===
Democrats held nine of their open seats.

- California 16: Zoe Lofgren
- Kentucky 3: Mike Ward
- Michigan 13: Lynn Rivers
- Missouri 5: Karen McCarthy
- Pennsylvania 2: Chaka Fattah
- Pennsylvania 20: Frank Mascara
- Texas 10: Lloyd Doggett
- Texas 18: Sheila Jackson Lee
- Texas 25: Ken Bentsen Jr.

=== Republican seats held ===
Republicans held 17 of their open seats.

- Arizona 4: John Shadegg
- California 22: Andrea Seastrand
- California 44: Sonny Bono
- Florida 16: Mark Foley
- Illinois 18: Ray LaHood
- Iowa 5: Tom Latham
- Maryland 2: Bob Ehrlich
- New Jersey 11: Rodney Frelinghuysen
- New York 4: Dan Frisa
- New York 19: Sue Kelly
- North Carolina 9: Sue Myrick
- Oklahoma 1: Steve Largent
- Oregon 2: Wes Cooley
- Pennsylvania 21: Phil English
- South Carolina 1: Mark Sanford
- Tennessee 7: Ed Bryant
- Wyoming at-large: Barbara Cubin

== Closest races ==
Eighty-seven races were decided by 10% or lower.

District	Winner	Margin
Connecticut 2nd	Democratic	0.01%
Oregon 1st	Democratic	0.12%
Minnesota 2nd	Democratic (flip)	0.24%
Kentucky 3rd	Democratic	0.28%
Pennsylvania 15th	Democratic	0.31%
California 36th	Democratic	0.41%
New York 26th	Democratic	0.64%
Wisconsin 1st	Republican (flip)	0.66%
California 22nd	Republican	0.75%
North Carolina 4th	Republican (flip)	0.79%
Nevada 1st	Republican (flip)	0.94%
Nebraska 2nd	Republican (flip)	0.95%
Alabama 5th	Democratic	1.01%
Tennessee 6th	Democratic	1.21%
New Jersey 8th	Republican (flip)	1.30%
California 24th	Democratic	1.83%
Washington 5th	Republican (flip)	1.84%
Ohio 6th	Republican (flip)	1.90%
Kentucky 1st	Republican (flip)	1.90%
California 42nd	Democratic	2.28%
California 49th	Republican (flip)	2.52%
Minnesota 7th	Democratic	2.56%
Pennsylvania 21st	Republican	2.57%
Texas 5th	Democratic	2.71%
Oregon 5th	Republican (flip)	3.02%
Massachusetts 6th	Republican	3.12% (Note: This seat was the tipping point seat for a Republican majority.)
North Carolina 7th	Democratic	3.14%
Florida 11th	Democratic	3.15%
Vermont at-large	Independent	3.30%
Washington 1st	Republican (flip)	3.31%
Ohio 13th	Democratic	3.54%
Washington 9th	Republican (flip)	3.58%
Arkansas 4th	Republican	3.61%
California 3rd	Democratic	3.65%
Maine 1st	Republican (flip)	3.78%
Georgia 7th	Republican (flip)	3.85%
Ohio 14th	Democratic	3.87%
Indiana 9th	Democratic	4.06%
Oklahoma 2nd	Republican (flip)	4.13%
Michigan 9th	Democratic	4.19%
Pennsylvania 13th	Republican (flip)	4.20%
South Carolina 5th	Democratic	4.28%
North Carolina 8th	Democratic	4.75%
Indiana 8th	Republican (flip)	4.86%
Maine 2nd	Democratic (flip)	4.94%
Ohio 19th	Republican (flip)	4.99%
Michigan 12th	Democratic	5.40%
North Carolina 3rd	Republican (flip)	5.42%
Missouri 9th	Democratic	5.44%
New Hampshire 2nd	Republican (flip)	5.49%
Texas 24th	Democratic	5.65%
Kansas 4th	Republican (flip)	5.82%
New York 1st	Republican (flip)	6.01%
Iowa 4th	Republican (flip)	6.15%
Pennsylvania 20th	Democratic	6.18%
Texas 9th	Republican (flip)	6.19%
Montana at-large	Democratic	6.43%
California 1st	Republican (flip)	6.55%
Virginia 5th	Democratic	6.57%
Tennessee 3rd	Republican (flip)	6.64%
Connecticut 5th	Republican	6.67%
Washington 4th	Republican (flip)	6.68%
Michigan 8th	Republican (flip)	6.72%
Michigan 13th	Democratic	6.76%
Indiana 10th	Democratic	6.91%
Minnesota 2nd	Democratic	7.01%
Arkansas 1st	Democratic	7.16%
North Dakota at-large	Democratic	7.28%
Texas 25th	Democratic	7.29%
Texas 17th	Democratic	7.32%
Washington 3rd	Republican (flip)	7.46%
Florida 15th	Republican (flip)	7.58%
Virginia 11th	Republican (flip)	7.60%
California 17th	Democratic	7.68%
Ohio 18th	Republican (flip)	7.95%
Rhode Island 1st	Democratic (flip)	8.30%
Illinois 3rd	Democratic	8.32%
Oklahoma 4th	Republican (flip)	8.37%
Wisconsin 7th	Democratic	6.64%
Illinois 5th	Republican (flip)	8.86%
Wisconsin 4th	Democratic	8.91%
Indiana 2nd	Republican (flip)	8.93%
Illinois 17th	Democratic	9.06%
Washington 2nd	Republican (flip)	9.33%
Pennsylvania 18th	Democratic (flip)	9.64%
Illinois 20th	Democratic	9.68%
Utah 2nd	Republican (flip)	9.97%

== Special elections ==
District	Predecessor	Party	First elected	Results Sorted by election date	Candidates
Oklahoma 6	Glenn English	Democratic	1974	Incumbent resigned January 7, 1994 to become vice president and general manager of the National Rural Electric Cooperative Association. Winner elected May 10, 1994. Republican gain. Winner was subsequently re-elected in November.	▌ ✓ Frank Lucas (Republican) 54.2%; ▌Dan Webber (Democratic) 45.9%
Kentucky 2	William Natcher	Democratic	1953 (Special)	Incumbent died March 29, 1994. Winner elected May 24, 1994. Republican gain. Winner was subsequently re-elected in November.	▌ ✓ Ron Lewis (Republican) 55.1%; ▌Joe Prather (Democratic) 44.8%; ▌James E. Rice (Independent) 0.1%

== Alabama ==
District	Incumbent			This race	
District	Representative	Party	First elected	Results	Candidates
Alabama 1	Sonny Callahan	Republican	1984	Incumbent re-elected.	▌ ✓ Sonny Callahan (Republican) 67.3%; ▌Don Womack (Democratic) 32.7%
Alabama 2	Terry Everett	Republican	1992	Incumbent re-elected.	▌ ✓ Terry Everett (Republican) 73.6%; ▌Brian Dowling (Democratic) 26.4%
Alabama 3	Glen Browder	Democratic	1989 (special)	Incumbent re-elected.	▌ ✓ Glen Browder (Democratic) 63.6%; ▌Ben Hand (Republican) 36.4%
Alabama 4	Tom Bevill	Democratic	1966	Incumbent re-elected.	▌ ✓ Tom Bevill (Democratic); Uncontested
Alabama 5	Bud Cramer	Democratic	1990	Incumbent re-elected.	▌ ✓ Bud Cramer (Democratic) 50.5%; ▌Wayne Parker (Republican) 49.5%
Alabama 6	Spencer Bachus	Republican	1992	Incumbent re-elected.	▌ ✓ Spencer Bachus (Republican) 79.0%; ▌Larry Fortenberry (Democratic) 20.9%
Alabama 7	Earl Hilliard	Democratic	1992	Incumbent re-elected.	▌ ✓ Earl Hilliard (Democratic) 76.9%; ▌Alfred J. Middleton. Sr. (Republican) 23.0%

== Alaska ==
District	Incumbent			This race	
District	Representative	Party	First elected	Results	Candidates
Alaska at-large	Don Young	Republican	1973 (special)	Incumbent re-elected.	▌ ✓ Don Young (Republican) 56.9%; ▌Tony Smith (Democratic) 32.7%; ▌Joni Whitmore (Green) 10.2%

== Arizona ==
District	Incumbent			This race	
District	Representative	Party	First elected	Results	Candidates
Arizona 1	Sam Coppersmith	Democratic	1992	Incumbent retired to run for U.S. Senator. Republican gain.	▌ ✓ Matt Salmon (Republican) 56.0%; ▌Chuck Blanchard (Democratic) 39.1%; ▌Bob Howarth (Libertarian) 4.9%
Arizona 2	Ed Pastor	Democratic	1991 (special)	Incumbent re-elected.	▌ ✓ Ed Pastor (Democratic) 62.3%; ▌Robert MacDonald (Republican) 32.7%; ▌James Bertrand (Libertarian) 5.0%
Arizona 3	Bob Stump	Republican	1976 (Note: Stump was originally elected as a Democrat. He switched parties in 1982 and was re-elected as such that year.)	Incumbent re-elected.	▌ ✓ Bob Stump (Republican) 70.1%; ▌Howard Lee Sprague (Democratic) 29.9%
Arizona 4	Jon Kyl	Republican	1986	Incumbent retired to run for U.S. Senator. Republican hold.	▌ ✓ John Shadegg (Republican) 60.2%; ▌Carol Cure (Democratic) 36.0%; ▌Mark Yannone (Libertarian) 3.8%
Arizona 5	Jim Kolbe	Republican	1984	Incumbent re-elected.	▌ ✓ Jim Kolbe (Republican) 67.7%; ▌Gary Auerbach (Democratic) 28.7%; ▌Phillip W. Murphy (Libertarian) 3.5%
Arizona 6	Karan English	Democratic	1992	Incumbent lost re-election. Republican gain.	▌ ✓ J. D. Hayworth (Republican) 54.6%; ▌Karan English (Democratic) 41.5%; ▌Sequoia R. Fuller (Libertarian) 3.9%

== Arkansas ==
District	Incumbent			This race	
District	Representative	Party	First elected	Results	Candidates
Arkansas 1	Blanche Lincoln	Democratic	1992	Incumbent re-elected.	▌ ✓ Blanche Lincoln (Democratic) 53.4%; ▌Warren Dupwe (Republican) 46.6%
Arkansas 2	Ray Thornton	Democratic	1972; 1978 (retired); 1990	Incumbent re-elected.	▌ ✓ Ray Thornton (Democratic) 57.4%; ▌Bill Powell (Republican) 42.6%
Arkansas 3	Tim Hutchinson	Republican	1992	Incumbent re-elected.	▌ ✓ Tim Hutchinson (Republican) 67.7%; ▌Berta L. Seitz (Democratic) 32.3%
Arkansas 4	Jay Dickey	Republican	1992	Incumbent re-elected.	▌ ✓ Jay Dickey (Republican) 51.8%; ▌Jay Bradford (Democratic) 48.2%

== California ==
District	Incumbent			This race	
District	Representative	Party	First elected	Results	Candidates
California 1	Dan Hamburg	Democratic	1992	Incumbent lost re-election. Republican gain.	▌ ✓ Frank Riggs (Republican) 53.3%; ▌Dan Hamburg (Democratic) 46.7%
California 2	Wally Herger	Republican	1986	Incumbent re-elected.	▌ ✓ Wally Herger (Republican) 64.2%; ▌Mary Jacobs (Democratic) 26%; ▌Devvy Kidd (American Independent) 7.3%; ▌Harry Hugh "Doc" Pendery (Libertarian) 2.5%
California 3	Vic Fazio	Democratic	1978	Incumbent re-elected.	▌ ✓ Vic Fazio (Democratic) 49.7%; ▌Tim Lefever (Republican) 46.1%; ▌Ross Crain (Libertarian) 4.2%
California 4	John Doolittle	Republican	1990	Incumbent re-elected.	▌ ✓ John Doolittle (Republican) 61.3%; ▌Katie Hirning (Democratic) 34.9%; ▌Damon C. Falconi (Libertarian) 3.8%
California 5	Bob Matsui	Democratic	1978	Incumbent re-elected.	▌ ✓ Bob Matsui (Democratic) 68.5%; ▌Robert S. Dinsmore (Republican) 29%; ▌Gordon D. Mors (American Independent) 2.5%
California 6	Lynn Woolsey	Democratic	1992	Incumbent re-elected.	▌ ✓ Lynn Woolsey (Democratic) 58.1%; ▌Mike Nuget (Republican) 37.6%; ▌Louis Beary (Libertarian) 2.6%; ▌Ernest K. Jones Jr. (Peace and Freedom) 1.7%
California 7	George Miller	Democratic	1974	Incumbent re-elected.	▌ ✓ George Miller (Democratic) 69.7%; ▌Charles V. Hughes (Republican) 27.4%; ▌William A. Callison (Peace and Freedom) 2.9%
California 8	Nancy Pelosi	Democratic	1987	Incumbent re-elected.	▌ ✓ Nancy Pelosi (Democratic) 81.8%; ▌Elsa Cheung (Republican) 18.2%
California 9	Ron Dellums	Democratic	1970	Incumbent re-elected.	▌ ✓ Ron Dellums (Democratic) 72.2%; ▌Deborah Wright (Republican) 22.6%; ▌Emma Wong Mar (Peace and Freedom) 5.1%
California 10	Bill Baker	Republican	1992	Incumbent re-elected.	▌ ✓ Bill Baker (Republican) 59.3%; ▌Ellen Schwartz (Democratic) 38.6%; ▌Craig W. Cooper (Peace and Freedom) 2.1%
California 11	Richard Pombo	Republican	1992	Incumbent re-elected.	▌ ✓ Richard Pombo (Republican) 62.1%; ▌Randy Perry (Democratic) 34.9%; ▌Joseph B. Miller (Libertarian) 3%
California 12	Tom Lantos	Democratic	1980	Incumbent re-elected.	▌ ✓ Tom Lantos (Democratic) 67.4%; ▌Deborah Wilder (Republican) 32.6%
California 13	Pete Stark	Democratic	1972	Incumbent re-elected.	▌ ✓ Pete Stark (Democratic) 64.6%; ▌Larry Molton (Republican) 30.2%; ▌Robert Gough (Libertarian) 5.1%
California 14	Anna Eshoo	Democratic	1992	Incumbent re-elected.	▌ ✓ Anna Eshoo (Democratic) 60.6%; ▌Ben Brink (Republican) 39.4%
California 15	Norman Mineta	Democratic	1974	Incumbent re-elected.	▌ ✓ Norman Mineta (Democratic) 59.9%; ▌Robert Wick (Republican) 40.1%
California 16	Don Edwards	Democratic	1962	Incumbent retired. Democratic hold.	▌ ✓ Zoe Lofgren (Democratic) 65%; ▌Lyle Smith (Republican) 35%
California 17	Sam Farr	Democratic	1993	Incumbent re-elected.	▌ ✓ Sam Farr (Democratic) 52.2%; ▌Bill McCampbell (Republican) 44.5%; ▌E. Craig Coffin (Green) 3.3%
California 18	Gary Condit	Democratic	1989	Incumbent re-elected.	▌ ✓ Gary Condit (Democratic) 65.5%; ▌Tom Carter (Republican) 31.7%; ▌James B. Morzella (Libertarian) 2.8%
California 19	Richard H. Lehman	Democratic	1982	Incumbent lost re-election. Republican gain.	▌ ✓ George Radanovich (Republican) 56.8%; ▌Richard H. Lehman (Democratic) 39.6%; ▌Dolores Comstock (Libertarian) 3.6%
California 20	Cal Dooley	Democratic	1990	Incumbent re-elected.	▌ ✓ Cal Dooley (Democratic) 56.7%; ▌Paul Young (Republican) 43.3%
California 21	Bill Thomas	Republican	1978	Incumbent re-elected.	▌ ✓ Bill Thomas (Republican) 68.1%; ▌John Evans (Democratic) 27.7%; ▌Mike Hodges (Libertarian) 4%
California 22	Michael Huffington	Republican	1992	Incumbent retired to run for U.S. Senator. Republican hold.	▌ ✓ Andrea Seastrand (Republican) 49.3%; ▌Walter Capps (Democratic) 48.5%; ▌David L. Bersohn (Libertarian) 2.2%
California 23	Elton Gallegly	Republican	1992	Incumbent re-elected.	▌ ✓ Elton Gallegly (Republican) 66.2%; ▌Kevin Ready (Democratic) 27.4%; ▌Bill Brown (Libertarian) 3.8%; ▌Robert Marston (Green) 2.6%
California 24	Anthony Beilenson	Democratic	1976	Incumbent re-elected.	▌ ✓ Anthony Beilenson (Democratic) 49.4%; ▌Rich Sybert (Republican) 47.5%; ▌John C. Koelher (Libertarian) 3.1%
California 25	Buck McKeon	Republican	1992	Incumbent re-elected.	▌ ✓ Buck McKeon (Republican) 64.9%; ▌James H. "Gil" Gilmartin (Democratic) 31.4%; ▌Devin Cutler (Libertarian) 3.7%
California 26	Howard Berman	Democratic	1982	Incumbent re-elected.	▌ ✓ Howard Berman (Democratic) 62.6%; ▌Gary E. Forsch (Republican) 32.2%; ▌Erich D. Miller (Libertarian) 5.2%
California 27	Carlos Moorhead	Republican	1972	Incumbent re-elected.	▌ ✓ Carlos Moorhead (Republican) 53%; ▌Doug Kahn (Democratic) 42.1%; ▌Bill Gibbs (American Independent) 2.6%; ▌Dennis Decherd (Libertarian) 2.3%
California 28	David Dreier	Republican	1980	Incumbent re-elected.	▌ ✓ David Dreier (Republican) 67.1%; ▌Tommy Randle (Democratic) 30.4%; ▌Jorj Clayton Baker (Libertarian) 2.5%
California 29	Henry Waxman	Democratic	1974	Incumbent re-elected.	▌ ✓ Henry Waxman (Democratic) 68%; ▌Paul Stepanek (Republican) 28.3%; ▌Michael J. Binkley (Libertarian) 3.8%
California 30	Xavier Becerra	Democratic	1992	Incumbent re-elected.	▌ ✓ Xavier Becerra (Democratic) 66.2%; ▌David Ramirez (Republican) 28.2%; ▌R. William Weilberg (Libertarian) 5.6%
California 31	Matthew G. Martínez	Democratic	1982	Incumbent re-elected.	▌ ✓ Matthew G. Martínez (Democratic) 59.1%; ▌John Flores (Republican) 40.9%
California 32	Julian Dixon	Democratic	1978	Incumbent re-elected.	▌ ✓ Julian Dixon (Democratic) 77.6%; ▌Ernie Farhat (Republican) 17.6%; ▌John Honigsfeld (Peace and Freedom) 4.8%
California 33	Lucille Roybal-Allard	Democratic	1992	Incumbent re-elected.	▌ ✓ Lucille Roybal-Allard (Democratic) 81.5%; ▌Kermit Booker (Peace and Freedom) 18.5%
California 34	Esteban Torres	Democratic	1982	Incumbent re-elected.	▌ ✓ Esteban Torres (Democratic) 61.7%; ▌Albert Nunez (Republican) 34.1%; ▌Marty Swinney (Libertarian) 4.2%
California 35	Maxine Waters	Democratic	1990	Incumbent re-elected.	▌ ✓ Maxine Waters (Democratic) 78.1%; ▌Nate Truman (Republican) 21.9%
California 36	Jane Harman	Democratic	1992	Incumbent re-elected.	▌ ✓ Jane Harman (Democratic) 48.0%; ▌Susan Brooks (Republican) 47.6%; ▌Jack Tyler (Libertarian) 2.5%; ▌Joe Fields (American Independent) 1.9%
California 37	Walter R. Tucker III	Democratic	1992	Incumbent re-elected.	▌ ✓ Walter R. Tucker III (Democratic) 77.4%; ▌Guy Wilson (Republican) 22.3%
California 38	Steve Horn	Republican	1992	Incumbent re-elected.	▌ ✓ Steve Horn (Republican) 58.5%; ▌Peter Mathews (Democratic) 36.8%; ▌Lester W. Mueller (Libertarian) 2.6%; ▌Richard K. Green (Peace and Freedom) 2.1%
California 39	Ed Royce	Republican	1992	Incumbent re-elected.	▌ ✓ Ed Royce (Republican) 66.4%; ▌Bob Davis (Democratic) 29%; ▌Jack Dean (Libertarian) 4.6%
California 40	Jerry Lewis	Republican	1978	Incumbent re-elected.	▌ ✓ Jerry Lewis (Republican) 70.7%; ▌Don Rusk (Democratic) 29.3%
California 41	Jay Kim	Republican	1992	Incumbent re-elected.	▌ ✓ Jay Kim (Republican) 62.1%; ▌Ed Tessier (Democratic) 37.9%
California 42	George Brown Jr.	Democratic	1962; 1970 (retired); 1972	Incumbent re-elected.	▌ ✓ George Brown Jr. (Democratic) 51.1%; ▌Robert Guzman (Republican) 48.8%
California 43	Ken Calvert	Republican	1992	Incumbent re-elected.	▌ ✓ Ken Calvert (Republican) 54.7%; ▌Mark Takano (Democratic) 38.4%; ▌Gene L. Berkman (Libertarian) 6.2%
California 44	Al McCandless	Republican	1984	Incumbent retired. Republican hold.	▌ ✓ Sonny Bono (Republican) 55.6%; ▌Steve Clute (Democratic) 38.1%; ▌Donald Cochran (American Independent) 6.3%
California 45	Dana Rohrabacher	Republican	1988	Incumbent re-elected.	▌ ✓ Dana Rohrabacher (Republican) 69.1%; ▌Brett Williamson (Democratic) 30.9%
California 46	Bob Dornan	Republican	1976; 1982 (retired); 1984	Incumbent re-elected.	▌ ✓ Bob Dornan (Republican) 57.1%; ▌Mike Farber (Democratic) 37.2%; ▌Richard G. Newhouse (Libertarian) 5.7%
California 47	Christopher Cox	Republican	1988	Incumbent re-elected.	▌ ✓ Christopher Cox (Republican) 71.7%; ▌Gary Kingbury (Democratic) 25%; ▌Victor A. Wagner Jr. (Libertarian) 3.4%
California 48	Ron Packard	Republican	1982	Incumbent re-elected.	▌ ✓ Ron Packard (Republican) 73.4%; ▌Andrei Leshick (Democratic) 22.2%; ▌Donna White (Peace and Freedom) 4.4%
California 49	Lynn Schenk	Democratic	1992	Incumbent lost re-election. Republican gain.	▌ ✓ Brian Bilbray (Republican) 48.5%; ▌Lynn Schenk (Democratic) 46%; ▌Chris Hoogenboom (Libertarian) 2.8%; ▌Renate M. Kline (Peace and Freedom) 2.7%
California 50	Bob Filner	Democratic	1992	Incumbent re-elected.	▌ ✓ Bob Filner (Democratic) 56.7%; ▌Mary Alice Acevedo (Republican) 35.4%; ▌Richardo Duenez (Libertarian) 3.2%; ▌Guillermo Ramirez (Peace and Freedom) 2.9%; ▌Kip Krueger (Green) 1.9%
California 51	Duke Cunningham	Republican	1990	Incumbent re-elected.	▌ ✓ Duke Cunningham (Republican) 66.9%; ▌Rita Tamerius (Democratic) 27.7%; ▌Bill Holmes (Libertarian) 3.4%; ▌Miriam E. Clark (Peace and Freedom) 2%
California 52	Duncan L. Hunter	Republican	1980	Incumbent re-elected.	▌ ✓ Duncan L. Hunter (Republican) 64%; ▌Janet M. Gastil (Democratic) 31.1%; ▌Joseph B. Shea (Libertarian) 3.1%; ▌Art Edelman (Peace and Freedom) 1.9%

== Colorado ==
District	Incumbent			This race	
District	Representative	Party	First elected	Results	Candidates
Colorado 1	Pat Schroeder	Democratic	1972	Incumbent re-elected.	▌ ✓ Pat Schroeder (Democratic) 60.0%; ▌William F. Eggert (Republican) 40.0%
Colorado 2	David Skaggs	Democratic	1986	Incumbent re-elected.	▌ ✓ David Skaggs (Democratic) 56.8%; ▌Patricia Miller (Republican) 43.2%
Colorado 3	Scott McInnis	Republican	1992	Incumbent re-elected.	▌ ✓ Scott McInnis (Republican) 69.6%; ▌Linda Powers (Democratic) 30.4%
Colorado 4	Wayne Allard	Republican	1990	Incumbent re-elected.	▌ ✓ Wayne Allard (Republican) 72.3%; ▌Cathy Kipp (Democratic) 27.7%
Colorado 5	Joel Hefley	Republican	1986	Incumbent re-elected.	▌ ✓ Joel Hefley (Republican); Uncontested
Colorado 6	Daniel Schaefer	Republican	1983	Incumbent re-elected.	▌ ✓ Daniel Schaefer (Republican) 69.8%; ▌John Hallen (Democratic) 28.0%; ▌John Heckman (Concerns of the People) 1.4%; ▌Stephen D. Dawson (Natural Law) 0.8%

== Connecticut ==
District	Incumbent			This race	
District	Representative	Party	First elected	Results	Candidates
Connecticut 1	Barbara B. Kennelly	Democratic	1982	Incumbent re-elected.	▌ ✓ Barbara B. Kennelly (Democratic) 73.5%; ▌Douglas Putnam (Republican) 24.7%; ▌John F. Forry III (Concerned Citizens) 1.8%
Connecticut 2	Sam Gejdenson	Democratic	1980	Incumbent re-elected.	▌ ✓ Sam Gejdenson (Democratic) 42.56%; ▌Edward W. Munster (Republican) 42.55%; ▌David Bingham (A Connecticut Party) 14.90%
Connecticut 3	Rosa DeLauro	Democratic	1990	Incumbent re-elected.	▌ ✓ Rosa DeLauro (Democratic) 63.4%; ▌Susan Johnson (Republican) 36.6%
Connecticut 4	Chris Shays	Republican	1987 (special)	Incumbent re-elected.	▌ ✓ Chris Shays (Republican) 74.4%; ▌Jonathan D. Kantrowitz (Democratic) 23.8%; ▌Irving Sussman (Libertarian) 1.3%; ▌Terry M. Nevas (Natural Law) 0.5%
Connecticut 5	Gary Franks	Republican	1990	Incumbent re-elected.	▌ ✓ Gary Franks (Republican) 52.2%; ▌James H. Maloney (Democratic) 45.5%; ▌Rosita Rodriguez (Concerned Citizens) 2.3%
Connecticut 6	Nancy Johnson	Republican	1982	Incumbent re-elected.	▌ ✓ Nancy Johnson (Republican) 63.9%; ▌Charlotte Koskoff (Democratic) 31.5%; ▌Patrick J. Danford (Concerned Citizens) 4.6%

== Delaware ==
District	Incumbent			This race	
District	Representative	Party	First elected	Results	Candidates
Delaware at-large	Mike Castle	Republican	1992	Incumbent re-elected.	▌ ✓ Mike Castle (Republican) 70.7%; ▌Carol Ann DeSantis (Democratic) 26.6%; ▌Danny Ray Beaver (Libertarian) 2.0%; ▌Donald M. Hockmuth (A Delaware Party) 0.7%

== Florida ==
District	Incumbent			This race	
District	Representative	Party	First elected	Results	Candidates
Florida 1	Earl Hutto	Democratic	1978	Incumbent retired. Republican gain.	▌ ✓ Joe Scarborough (Republican) 61.6%; ▌Vince Whibbs Jr. (Democratic) 38.4%
Florida 2	Pete Peterson	Democratic	1990	Incumbent re-elected.	▌ ✓ Pete Peterson (Democratic) 61.3%; ▌Carole Griffin (Republican) 38.7%
Florida 3	Corrine Brown	Democratic	1992	Incumbent re-elected.	▌ ✓ Corrine Brown (Democratic) 57.7%; ▌Marc Little (Republican) 42.3%
Florida 4	Tillie Fowler	Republican	1992	Incumbent re-elected.	▌ ✓ Tillie Fowler (Republican); Uncontested
Florida 5	Karen Thurman	Democratic	1992	Incumbent re-elected.	▌ ✓ Karen Thurman (Democratic) 57.2%; ▌Don Garlits (Republican) 42.8%
Florida 6	Cliff Stearns	Republican	1988	Incumbent re-elected.	▌ ✓ Cliff Stearns (Republican); Uncontested
Florida 7	John Mica	Republican	1992	Incumbent re-elected.	▌ ✓ John Mica (Republican) 73.4%; ▌Edward D. Goddard (Democratic) 26.6%
Florida 8	Bill McCollum	Republican	1980	Incumbent re-elected.	▌ ✓ Bill McCollum (Republican); Uncontested
Florida 9	Michael Bilirakis	Republican	1982	Incumbent re-elected.	▌ ✓ Michael Bilirakis (Republican); Uncontested
Florida 10	Bill Young	Republican	1970	Incumbent re-elected.	▌ ✓ Bill Young (Republican); Uncontested
Florida 11	Sam Gibbons	Democratic	1962	Incumbent re-elected.	▌ ✓ Sam Gibbons (Democratic) 51.6%; ▌Mark Sharpe (Republican) 48.2%
Florida 12	Charles Canady	Republican	1992	Incumbent re-elected.	▌ ✓ Charles Canady (Republican) 65.0%; ▌Robert Connors (Democratic) 35.0%
Florida 13	Dan Miller	Republican	1992	Incumbent re-elected.	▌ ✓ Dan Miller (Republican); Uncontested
Florida 14	Porter Goss	Republican	1988	Incumbent re-elected.	▌ ✓ Porter Goss (Republican); Uncontested
Florida 15	Jim Bacchus	Democratic	1990	Incumbent retired. Republican gain.	▌ ✓ Dave Weldon (Republican) 53.7%; ▌Sue Munsey (Democratic) 46.1%
Florida 16	Tom Lewis	Republican	1982	Incumbent retired. Republican hold.	▌ ✓ Mark Foley (Republican) 58.1%; ▌John P. Comerford (Democratic) 41.9%
Florida 17	Carrie Meek	Democratic	1992	Incumbent re-elected.	▌ ✓ Carrie Meek (Democratic); Uncontested
Florida 18	Ileana Ros-Lehtinen	Republican	1989 (special)	Incumbent re-elected.	▌ ✓ Ileana Ros-Lehtinen (Republican); Uncontested
Florida 19	Harry Johnston	Democratic	1988	Incumbent re-elected.	▌ ✓ Harry Johnston (Democratic) 66.1%; ▌Peter J. Tsakanikas (Republican) 33.9%
Florida 20	Peter Deutsch	Democratic	1992	Incumbent re-elected.	▌ ✓ Peter Deutsch (Democratic) 61.2%; ▌Beverly Kennedy (Republican) 38.8%
Florida 21	Lincoln Díaz-Balart	Republican	1992	Incumbent re-elected.	▌ ✓ Lincoln Díaz-Balart (Republican); Uncontested
Florida 22	Clay Shaw	Republican	1980	Incumbent re-elected.	▌ ✓ Clay Shaw (Republican) 63.4%; ▌Hermine L. Wiener (Democratic) 36.6%
Florida 23	Alcee Hastings	Democratic	1992	Incumbent re-elected.	▌ ✓ Alcee Hastings (Democratic); Uncontested

== Georgia ==
District	Incumbent			This race	
District	Representative	Party	First elected	Results	Candidates
Georgia 1	Jack Kingston	Republican	1992	Incumbent re-elected.	▌ ✓ Jack Kingston (Republican) 76.6%; ▌Raymond Beckworth (Democratic) 23.4%
Georgia 2	Sanford Bishop	Democratic	1992	Incumbent re-elected.	▌ ✓ Sanford Bishop (Democratic) 66.2%; ▌John Clayton (Republican) 33.8%
Georgia 3	Mac Collins	Republican	1992	Incumbent re-elected.	▌ ✓ Mac Collins (Republican) 65.5%; ▌Fred Overby (Democratic) 34.5%
Georgia 4	John Linder	Republican	1992	Incumbent re-elected.	▌ ✓ John Linder (Republican) 57.9%; ▌Comer Yates (Democratic) 42.1%
Georgia 5	John Lewis	Democratic	1986	Incumbent re-elected.	▌ ✓ John Lewis (Democratic) 69.1%; ▌Dale Dixon (Republican) 30.9%
Georgia 6	Newt Gingrich	Republican	1978	Incumbent re-elected.	▌ ✓ Newt Gingrich (Republican) 64.2%; ▌Ben Jones (Democratic) 35.8%
Georgia 7	George Darden	Democratic	1983	Incumbent lost re-election. Republican gain.	▌ ✓ Bob Barr (Republican) 51.9%; ▌George Darden (Democratic) 48.1%
Georgia 8	J. Roy Rowland	Democratic	1982	Incumbent retired. Republican gain.	▌ ✓ Saxby Chambliss (Republican) 62.7%; ▌Craig Mathis (Democratic) 37.3%
Georgia 9	Nathan Deal	Democratic	1992	Incumbent re-elected.	▌ ✓ Nathan Deal (Democratic) 57.9%; ▌Robert L. Castello (Republican) 42.1%
Georgia 10	Don Johnson Jr.	Democratic	1992	Incumbent lost re-election. Republican gain.	▌ ✓ Charlie Norwood (Republican) 65.2%; ▌Don Johnson Jr. (Democratic) 34.8%
Georgia 11	Cynthia McKinney	Democratic	1992	Incumbent re-elected.	▌ ✓ Cynthia McKinney (Democratic) 65.6%; ▌Woodrow Lovett (Republican) 34.4%

== Hawaii ==
District	Incumbent			This race	
District	Representative	Party	First elected	Results	Candidates
Hawaii 1	Neil Abercrombie	Democratic	1986 (special); 1988 (lost renomination); 1990	Incumbent re-elected.	▌ ✓ Neil Abercrombie (Democratic) 53.6%; ▌Orson Swindle (Republican) 43.4%; ▌Alexandria Kaan (Best) 1.6%; ▌Roger Lee Taylor (Libertarian) 1.4%
Hawaii 2	Patsy Mink	Democratic	1964; 1976 (retired); 1990 (special)	Incumbent re-elected.	▌ ✓ Patsy Mink (Democratic) 70.1%; ▌Robert H. Garner (Republican) 24.2%; ▌Larry Bartley (Libertarian) 5.7%

== Idaho ==
District	Incumbent			This race	
District	Representative	Party	First elected	Results	Candidates
Idaho 1	Larry LaRocco	Democratic	1990	Incumbent lost re-election. Republican gain.	▌ ✓ Helen Chenoweth (Republican) 55.4%; ▌Larry LaRocco (Democratic) 44.6%
Idaho 2	Mike Crapo	Republican	1992	Incumbent re-elected.	▌ ✓ Mike Crapo (Republican) 75.0%; ▌Penny Fletcher (Democratic) 25.0%

== Illinois ==
District	Incumbent			This race	
District	Representative	Party	First elected	Results	Candidates
Illinois 1	Bobby Rush	Democratic	1992	Incumbent re-elected.	▌ ✓ Bobby Rush (Democratic) 75.7%; ▌William J. Kelly (Republican) 24.3%
Illinois 2	Mel Reynolds	Democratic	1992	Incumbent re-elected.	▌ ✓ Mel Reynolds (Democratic); Uncontested
Illinois 3	Bill Lipinski	Democratic	1982	Incumbent re-elected.	▌ ✓ Bill Lipinski (Democratic) 54.2%; ▌Jim Nalepa (Republican) 45.8%
Illinois 4	Luis Gutiérrez	Democratic	1992	Incumbent re-elected.	▌ ✓ Luis Gutiérrez (Democratic) 75.2%; ▌Steven Valtierra (Republican) 24.8%
Illinois 5	Dan Rostenkowski	Democratic	1958	Incumbent lost re-election. Republican gain.	▌ ✓ Michael Flanagan (Republican) 54.4%; ▌Dan Rostenkowski (Democratic) 45.6%
Illinois 6	Henry Hyde	Republican	1974	Incumbent re-elected.	▌ ✓ Henry Hyde (Republican) 73.5%; ▌Tom Berry (Democratic) 23.6%; ▌Robert L. Hogan (Libertarian) 1.7%; ▌Robert L. Wheat (United Ind.) 1.2%
Illinois 7	Cardiss Collins	Democratic	1973 (special)	Incumbent re-elected.	▌ ✓ Cardiss Collins (Democratic) 79.6%; ▌Charles Mobley (Republican) 20.4%
Illinois 8	Phil Crane	Republican	1969 (special)	Incumbent re-elected.	▌ ✓ Phil Crane (Republican) 64.9%; ▌Robert C. Walberg (Democratic) 35.1%
Illinois 9	Sidney R. Yates	Democratic	1948; 1962 (retired); 1964	Incumbent re-elected.	▌ ✓ Sidney R. Yates (Democratic) 66.1%; ▌George E. Larney (Republican) 33.9%
Illinois 10	John Porter	Republican	1980	Incumbent re-elected.	▌ ✓ John Porter (Republican) 75.1%; ▌Andrew M. Krupp (Democratic) 24.9%
Illinois 11	George Sangmeister	Democratic	1988	Incumbent retired. Republican gain.	▌ ✓ Jerry Weller (Republican) 60.6%; ▌Frank Giglio (Democratic) 39.4%
Illinois 12	Jerry Costello	Democratic	1988	Incumbent re-elected.	▌ ✓ Jerry Costello (Democratic) 65.9%; ▌Jan Morris (Republican) 34.1%
Illinois 13	Harris Fawell	Republican	1984	Incumbent re-elected.	▌ ✓ Harris Fawell (Republican) 73.1%; ▌William A. Riley (Democratic) 26.9%
Illinois 14	Dennis Hastert	Republican	1986	Incumbent re-elected.	▌ ✓ Dennis Hastert (Republican) 76.5%; ▌Steve Denari (Democratic) 23.5%
Illinois 15	Tom Ewing	Republican	1991	Incumbent re-elected.	▌ ✓ Tom Ewing (Republican) 68.2%; ▌Paul Alexander (Democratic) 31.8%
Illinois 16	Don Manzullo	Republican	1992	Incumbent re-elected.	▌ ✓ Don Manzullo (Republican) 70.6%; ▌Pete Sullivan (Democratic) 29.4%
Illinois 17	Lane Evans	Democratic	1982	Incumbent re-elected.	▌ ✓ Lane Evans (Democratic) 54.5%; ▌Jim Anderson (Republican) 45.5%
Illinois 18	Robert H. Michel	Republican	1956	Incumbent retired. Republican hold.	▌ ✓ Ray LaHood (Republican) 60.2%; ▌G. Douglas Stephens (Democratic) 39.3%
Illinois 19	Glenn Poshard	Democratic	1988	Incumbent re-elected.	▌ ✓ Glenn Poshard (Democratic) 58.4%; ▌Brent Winters (Republican) 41.6%
Illinois 20	Richard Durbin	Democratic	1982	Incumbent re-elected.	▌ ✓ Richard Durbin (Democratic) 54.8%; ▌Bill Owens (Republican) 45.2%

== Indiana ==
District	Incumbent			This race	
District	Representative	Party	First elected	Results	Candidates
Indiana 1	Pete Visclosky	Democratic	1984	Incumbent re-elected.	▌ ✓ Pete Visclosky (Democratic) 56.5%; ▌John Larson (Republican) 43.5%
Indiana 2	Philip Sharp	Democratic	1974	Incumbent retired. Republican gain.	▌ ✓ David McIntosh (Republican) 54.5%; ▌Joe Hogsett (Democratic) 45.5%
Indiana 3	Tim Roemer	Democratic	1990	Incumbent re-elected.	▌ ✓ Tim Roemer (Democratic) 55.2%; ▌Richard Burkett (Republican) 44.8%
Indiana 4	Jill L. Long	Democratic	1989	Incumbent lost re-election. Republican gain.	▌ ✓ Mark Souder (Republican) 55.4%; ▌Jill L. Long (Democratic) 44.6%
Indiana 5	Steve Buyer	Republican	1992	Incumbent re-elected.	▌ ✓ Steve Buyer (Republican) 69.5%; ▌J. D. Beatty (Democratic) 28.3%; ▌Clayton L. Alfred (Independent) 2.1%
Indiana 6	Dan Burton	Republican	1982	Incumbent re-elected.	▌ ✓ Dan Burton (Republican) 77.0%; ▌Natalie M. Bruner (Democratic) 23.0%
Indiana 7	John T. Myers	Republican	1966	Incumbent re-elected.	▌ ✓ John T. Myers (Republican) 65.1%; ▌Michael M. Harmless (Democratic) 34.9%
Indiana 8	Frank McCloskey	Democratic	1982	Incumbent lost re-election. Republican gain.	▌ ✓ John Hostettler (Republican) 52.4%; ▌Frank McCloskey (Democratic) 47.6%
Indiana 9	Lee Hamilton	Democratic	1964	Incumbent re-elected.	▌ ✓ Lee Hamilton (Democratic) 52.0%; ▌Jean Leising (Republican) 48.0%
Indiana 10	Andrew Jacobs Jr.	Democratic	1964; 1972 (defeated); 1974	Incumbent re-elected.	▌ ✓ Andrew Jacobs Jr. (Democratic) 53.5%; ▌Marvin Scott (Republican) 46.5%

== Iowa ==
District	Incumbent			This race	
District	Representative	Party	First elected	Results	Candidates
Iowa 1	Jim Leach	Republican	1976	Incumbent re-elected.	▌ ✓ Jim Leach (Republican) 60.2%; ▌Glen Winekauf (Democratic) 37.9%; ▌Jan J. Zonneveld (Independent) 1.2%; ▌Michael Cuddehe (Natural Law) 0.7%
Iowa 2	Jim Nussle	Republican	1990	Incumbent re-elected.	▌ ✓ Jim Nussle (Republican) 56.0%; ▌David R. Nagle (Democratic) 43.4%; ▌Albert W. Schoeman (Libertarian) 0.6%
Iowa 3	Jim Ross Lightfoot	Republican	1984	Incumbent re-elected.	▌ ✓ Jim Ross Lightfoot (Republican) 57.8%; ▌Elaine Baxter (Democratic) 41.0%; ▌Derrick P. Grimmer (Grassroots) 1.2%
Iowa 4	Neal Smith	Democratic	1958	Incumbent lost re-election. Republican gain.	▌ ✓ Greg Ganske (Republican) 52.5%; ▌Neal Smith (Democratic) 46.4%; Others: ▌Joshua A. Roberts (Natural Law) 0.4%; ▌William C. Oviatt (Grassroots) 0.4%; ▌Angela L. Lariscy (Socialist Workers) 0.3%
Iowa 5	Fred Grandy	Republican	1986	Incumbent retired to run for Governor of Iowa. Republican hold.	▌ ✓ Tom Latham (Republican) 60.8%; ▌Sheila McGuire Riggs (Democratic) 39.0%

== Kansas ==
District	Incumbent			This race	
District	Representative	Party	First elected	Results	Candidates
Kansas 1	Pat Roberts	Republican	1980	Incumbent re-elected.	▌ ✓ Pat Roberts (Republican) 77.4%; ▌Terry L. Nichols (Democratic) 22.6%
Kansas 2	Jim Slattery	Democratic	1982	Incumbent retired to run for Governor of Kansas. Republican gain.	▌ ✓ Sam Brownback (Republican) 65.6%; ▌John W. Carlin (Democratic) 34.4%
Kansas 3	Jan Meyers	Republican	1984	Incumbent re-elected.	▌ ✓ Jan Meyers (Republican) 56.6%; ▌Judy Hancock (Democratic) 43.4%
Kansas 4	Dan Glickman	Democratic	1976	Incumbent lost re-election. Republican gain.	▌ ✓ Todd Tiahrt (Republican) 52.9%; ▌Dan Glickman (Democratic) 47.1%

== Kentucky ==
District	Incumbent			This race	
District	Representative	Party	First elected	Results	Candidates
Kentucky 1	Thomas Barlow	Democratic	1992	Incumbent lost re-election. Republican gain.	▌ ✓ Ed Whitfield (Republican) 51.0%; ▌Thomas Barlow (Democratic) 49.0%
Kentucky 2	Ron Lewis	Republican	1994	Incumbent re-elected.	▌ ✓ Ron Lewis (Republican) 59.8%; ▌David Adkisson (Democratic) 40.2%
Kentucky 3	Romano Mazzoli	Democratic	1970	Incumbent retired. Democratic hold.	▌ ✓ Mike Ward (Democratic) 44.4%; ▌Susan Stokes (Republican) 44.1%; ▌Richard Lewis (US Taxpayers) 11.6%
Kentucky 4	Jim Bunning	Republican	1986	Incumbent re-elected.	▌ ✓ Jim Bunning (Republican) 74.1%; ▌Sally Harris Skaggs (Democratic) 25.9%
Kentucky 5	Hal Rogers	Republican	1980	Incumbent re-elected.	▌ ✓ Hal Rogers (Republican) 79.4%; ▌Walter Blevins (Democratic) 20.6%
Kentucky 6	Scotty Baesler	Democratic	1992	Incumbent re-elected.	▌ ✓ Scotty Baesler (Democratic) 58.8%; ▌Matthew Eric Wills (Republican) 41.2%

== Louisiana ==
District	Incumbent			This race	
District	Representative	Party	First elected	Results	Candidates
Louisiana 1	Bob Livingston	Republican	1977 (special)	Incumbent re-elected.	▌ ✓ Bob Livingston (Republican) 81.2%; ▌Forrest McNeir (Democratic) 11.9%; ▌Clark Simmons (Independent) 6.9%
Louisiana 2	William Jefferson	Democratic	1990	Incumbent re-elected.	▌ ✓ William Jefferson (Democratic) 77.6%; ▌Robert Namer (Republican) 19.2%; ▌Julius Leahman (Democratic) 3.2%
Louisiana 3	Billy Tauzin	Democratic	1980	Incumbent re-elected.	▌ ✓ Billy Tauzin (Democratic) 76.2%; ▌Nicholas J. Accardo (Independent) 23.8%
Louisiana 4	Cleo Fields	Democratic	1992	Incumbent re-elected.	▌ ✓ Cleo Fields (Democratic) 69.9%; ▌Patricia Slocum (Republican) 30.1%
Louisiana 5	Jim McCrery	Republican	1988	Incumbent re-elected.	▌ ✓ Jim McCrery (Republican) 79.8%; ▌Paul Henry Kidd (Democratic) 16.2%; ▌E. Austin Simmons (Independent) 4.0%
Louisiana 6	Richard Baker	Republican	1986	Incumbent re-elected.	▌ ✓ Richard Baker (Republican) 81.1%; ▌Darryl Paul Ward (Democratic) 18.9%
Louisiana 7	Jimmy Hayes	Democratic	1986	Incumbent re-elected.	▌ ✓ Jimmy Hayes (Democratic) 53.0%; ▌Clyde C. Holloway (Republican) 39.7%; ▌Ron Caesar (Independent) 7.3%

== Maine ==
District	Incumbent			This race	
District	Representative	Party	First elected	Results	Candidates
Maine 1	Thomas Andrews	Democratic	1990	Incumbent retired to run for U.S. Senator. Republican gain.	▌ ✓ James B. Longley Jr. (Republican) 51.9%; ▌Dennis L. Dutremble (Democratic) 48.1%
Maine 2	Olympia Snowe	Republican	1978	Incumbent retired to run for U.S. Senator. Democratic gain.	▌ ✓ John Baldacci (Democratic) 45.7%; ▌Rick Bennett (Republican) 40.8%; ▌John M. Michael (Independent) 8.8%; ▌Charles Fitzgerald (Green) 4.7%

== Maryland ==
District	Incumbent			This race	
District	Representative	Party	First elected	Results	Candidates
Maryland 1	Wayne Gilchrest	Republican	1990	Incumbent re-elected.	▌ ✓ Wayne Gilchrest (Republican) 67.7%; ▌Ralph T. Gies (Democratic) 32.3%
Maryland 2	Helen Delich Bentley	Republican	1984	Incumbent retired to run for Governor of Maryland. Republican hold.	▌ ✓ Bob Ehrlich (Republican) 62.7%; ▌Gerry L. Brewster (Democratic) 37.2%
Maryland 3	Ben Cardin	Democratic	1986	Incumbent re-elected.	▌ ✓ Ben Cardin (Democratic) 71.0%; ▌Robert Ryan Tousey (Republican) 29.0%
Maryland 4	Albert Wynn	Democratic	1992	Incumbent re-elected.	▌ ✓ Albert Wynn (Democratic) 75.0%; ▌Michele H. Dyson (Republican) 25.0%
Maryland 5	Steny Hoyer	Democratic	1981	Incumbent re-elected.	▌ ✓ Steny Hoyer (Democratic) 58.8%; ▌Donald Devine (Republican) 41.2%
Maryland 6	Roscoe Bartlett	Republican	1992	Incumbent re-elected.	▌ ✓ Roscoe Bartlett (Republican) 65.9%; ▌Paul Muldowney (Democratic) 34.1%
Maryland 7	Kweisi Mfume	Democratic	1986	Incumbent re-elected.	▌ ✓ Kweisi Mfume (Democratic) 81.5%; ▌Kenneth Kondner (Republican) 18.5%
Maryland 8	Connie Morella	Republican	1986	Incumbent re-elected.	▌ ✓ Connie Morella (Republican) 70.3%; ▌Steven Van Grack (Democratic) 29.7%

== Massachusetts ==
District	Incumbent			This race	
District	Representative	Party	First elected	Results	Candidates
Massachusetts 1	John Olver	Democratic	1991	Incumbent re-elected.	▌ ✓ John Olver (Democratic); Uncontested
Massachusetts 2	Richard Neal	Democratic	1988	Incumbent re-elected.	▌ ✓ Richard Neal (Democratic) 58.6%; ▌John M. Briare (Republican) 36.3%; ▌Kate Ross (Natural Law) 5.1%
Massachusetts 3	Peter Blute	Republican	1992	Incumbent re-elected.	▌ ✓ Peter Blute (Republican) 54.6%; ▌Kevin O'Sullivan (Democratic) 44.2%; ▌Dale E. Friedgen (Natural Law) 1.1%
Massachusetts 4	Barney Frank	Democratic	1980	Incumbent re-elected.	▌ ✓ Barney Frank (Democratic); Uncontested
Massachusetts 5	Marty Meehan	Democratic	1992	Incumbent re-elected.	▌ ✓ Marty Meehan (Democratic) 69.8%; ▌David E. Coleman (Republican) 30.1%
Massachusetts 6	Peter G. Torkildsen	Republican	1992	Incumbent re-elected.	▌ ✓ Peter G. Torkildsen (Republican) 50.5%; ▌John F. Tierney (Democratic) 47.4%; ▌Benjamin A. Gatchell (Independent) 2.1%
Massachusetts 7	Ed Markey	Democratic	1976	Incumbent re-elected.	▌ ✓ Ed Markey (Democratic) 64.4%; ▌Brad Bailey (Republican) 35.5%
Massachusetts 8	Joseph P. Kennedy II	Democratic	1986	Incumbent re-elected.	▌ ✓ Joseph P. Kennedy II (Democratic); Uncontested
Massachusetts 9	Joe Moakley	Democratic	1972	Incumbent re-elected.	▌ ✓ Joe Moakley (Democratic) 69.8%; ▌Michael M. Murphy (Republican) 30.2%
Massachusetts 10	Gerry Studds	Democratic	1972	Incumbent re-elected.	▌ ✓ Gerry Studds (Democratic) 68.7%; ▌Keith Jason Hemeon (Republican) 31.2%

== Michigan ==
District	Incumbent			This race	
District	Representative	Party	First elected	Results	Candidates
Michigan 1	Bart Stupak	Democratic	1992	Incumbent re-elected.	▌ ✓ Bart Stupak (Democratic) 56.9%; ▌Gil Ziegler (Republican) 42.0%; ▌Michael McPeak (Natural Law) 1.1%
Michigan 2	Pete Hoekstra	Republican	1992	Incumbent re-elected.	▌ ✓ Pete Hoekstra (Republican) 75.3%; ▌Marcus Hoover (Democratic) 23.7%; ▌Lucille Wiggins (Natural Law) 1.0%
Michigan 3	Vern Ehlers	Republican	1993	Incumbent re-elected.	▌ ✓ Vern Ehlers (Republican) 73.9%; ▌Betsy J. Flory (Democratic) 23.5%; ▌Barrie Leslie Konicov (Libertarian) 1.6%; ▌Susan H. Normandin (Natural Law) 1.0%
Michigan 4	Dave Camp	Republican	1990	Incumbent re-elected.	▌ ✓ Dave Camp (Republican) 73.1%; ▌Damion Frasier (Democratic) 25.5%; ▌Michael Lee (Natural Law) 1.4%
Michigan 5	James Barcia	Democratic	1992	Incumbent re-elected.	▌ ✓ James Barcia (Democratic) 65.5%; ▌William T. Anderson (Republican) 31.8%; ▌Larry L. Fairchild (Independent) 1.6%; ▌Susan I. Arnold (Natural Law) 1.2%
Michigan 6	Fred Upton	Republican	1986	Incumbent re-elected.	▌ ✓ Fred Upton (Republican) 73.5%; ▌David Taylor (Democratic) 25.5%; ▌Ennis A. Berker (Natural Law) 1.0%
Michigan 7	Nick Smith	Republican	1992	Incumbent re-elected.	▌ ✓ Nick Smith (Republican) 65.1%; ▌Kim McCaughtry (Democratic) 32.3%; ▌Kenneth L. Proctor (Libertarian) 1.9%; ▌Scott K. Williamson (Natural Law) 0.7%
Michigan 8	Bob Carr	Democratic	1974; 1980 (defeated); 1982	Incumbent retired to run for U.S. Senator. Republican gain.	▌ ✓ Dick Chrysler (Republican) 51.6%; ▌Bob Mitchell (Democratic) 44.9%; ▌Gerald Ralph Turcotte Jr. (Libertarian) 2.0%; ▌Susan Ilene McPeak (Natural Law) 1.4%
Michigan 9	Dale Kildee	Democratic	1976	Incumbent re-elected.	▌ ✓ Dale Kildee (Democratic) 51.2%; ▌Megan O'Neill (Republican) 47.0%; ▌Karen Blasdell-Wilkinson (Natural Law) 1.7%
Michigan 10	David Bonior	Democratic	1976	Incumbent re-elected.	▌ ✓ David Bonior (Democratic) 62.2%; ▌Donald J. Lobsinger (Republican) 37.7%
Michigan 11	Joe Knollenberg	Republican	1992	Incumbent re-elected.	▌ ✓ Joe Knollenberg (Republican) 68.2%; ▌Mike Breshgold (Democratic) 30.5%; ▌John R. Hocking (Natural Law) 1.3%
Michigan 12	Sander Levin	Democratic	1982	Incumbent re-elected.	▌ ✓ Sander Levin (Democratic) 52.0%; ▌John Pappageorge (Republican) 46.6%; Others: ▌Jerome S. White (Independent) 0.7%; ▌Eric R. Anderson (Natural Law) 0.7%
Michigan 13	William D. Ford	Democratic	1964	Incumbent retired. Democratic hold.	▌ ✓ Lynn Rivers (Democratic) 51.9%; ▌John A. Schall (Republican) 45.1%; ▌Craig L. Seymour (Libertarian) 1.8%; Others: ▌Helen Halyard (Independent) 0.8%; ▌Gail Anne Petrosoff (Natural Law) 0.4%
Michigan 14	John Conyers	Democratic	1964	Incumbent re-elected.	▌ ✓ John Conyers (Democratic) 81.5%; ▌Richard Charles Fournier (Republican) 16.6%; ▌Richard R. Miller (Natural Law) 1.9%
Michigan 15	Barbara-Rose Collins	Democratic	1990	Incumbent re-elected.	▌ ✓ Barbara-Rose Collins (Democratic) 84.1%; ▌John W. Savage II (Republican) 14.1%; Others: ▌Cynthia M. Jaquith (Independent) 0.7%; ▌Henry Ogden Clark (Natural Law) 0.6%; ▌Larry Roberts (Independent) 0.5%
Michigan 16	John Dingell	Democratic	1955 (Special)	Incumbent re-elected.	▌ ✓ John Dingell (Democratic) 59.1%; ▌Ken Larkin (Republican) 39.8%; ▌Noha Fouad Hamze (Natural Law) 1.1%

== Minnesota ==
District	Incumbent			This race	
District	Representative	Party	First elected	Results	Candidates
Minnesota 1	Tim Penny	DFL	1982	Incumbent retired. Republican gain.	▌ ✓ Gil Gutknecht (Republican) 55.2%; ▌John C. Hottinger (DFL) 44.7%
Minnesota 2	David Minge	DFL	1992	Incumbent re-elected.	▌ ✓ David Minge (DFL) 52.0%; ▌Gary Revier (Republican) 45.0%; ▌Stan Bentz (Reform) 3.0%
Minnesota 3	Jim Ramstad	Republican	1990	Incumbent re-elected.	▌ ✓ Jim Ramstad (Republican) 73.2%; ▌Bob Olson (DFL) 26.3%
Minnesota 4	Bruce Vento	DFL	1976	Incumbent re-elected.	▌ ✓ Bruce Vento (DFL) 54.7%; ▌Dennis Newinski (Republican) 41.8%; ▌Dan R. Vacek (Grassroots) 2.9%
Minnesota 5	Martin Olav Sabo	DFL	1978	Incumbent re-elected.	▌ ✓ Martin Olav Sabo (DFL) 61.9%; ▌Dorothy Legrand (Republican) 37.3%
Minnesota 6	Rod Grams	Republican	1992	Incumbent retired to run for U.S. Senator. DFL gain.	▌ ✓ Bill Luther (DFL) 49.9%; ▌Tad Jude (Republican) 49.7%
Minnesota 7	Collin Peterson	DFL	1990	Incumbent re-elected.	▌ ✓ Collin Peterson (DFL) 51.2%; ▌Bernie Omann (Republican) 48.6%
Minnesota 8	Jim Oberstar	DFL	1974	Incumbent re-elected.	▌ ✓ Jim Oberstar (DFL) 65.7%; ▌Phil Herwig (Republican) 34.2%

== Mississippi ==
District	Incumbent			This race	
District	Representative	Party	First elected	Results	Candidates
Mississippi 1	Jamie Whitten	Democratic	1941	Incumbent retired. Republican gain.	▌ ✓ Roger Wicker (Republican) 63.1%; ▌Bill Wheeler (Democratic) 36.9%
Mississippi 2	Bennie Thompson	Democratic	1993	Incumbent re-elected.	▌ ✓ Bennie Thompson (Democratic) 53.7%; ▌Bill Jordan (Republican) 38.9%; ▌Vincent P. Thornton (US Taxpayers) 7.4%
Mississippi 3	Sonny Montgomery	Democratic	1966	Incumbent re-elected.	▌ ✓ Sonny Montgomery (Democratic) 67.6%; ▌Dutch Dabbs (Republican) 32.4%
Mississippi 4	Michael Parker	Democratic	1988	Incumbent re-elected.	▌ ✓ Michael Parker (Democratic) 68.5%; ▌Mike Wood (Republican) 31.5%
Mississippi 5	Gene Taylor	Democratic	1989	Incumbent re-elected.	▌ ✓ Gene Taylor (Democratic) 60.1%; ▌George Barlos (Republican) 39.9%

== Missouri ==
District	Incumbent			This race	
District	Representative	Party	First elected	Results	Candidates
Missouri 1	Bill Clay	Democratic	1968	Incumbent re-elected.	▌ ✓ Bill Clay (Democratic) 63.4%; ▌Donald R. Counts (Republican) 32.9%; ▌Craig W. Williamson (Libertarian) 3.7%
Missouri 2	Jim Talent	Republican	1992	Incumbent re-elected.	▌ ✓ Jim Talent (Republican) 67.3%; ▌Pat Kelly (Democratic) 30.6%; ▌James Higgins (Libertarian) 2.1%
Missouri 3	Dick Gephardt	Democratic	1976	Incumbent re-elected.	▌ ✓ Dick Gephardt (Democratic) 57.7%; ▌Gary Gill (Republican) 39.7%; ▌Bradley Ems (Libertarian) 2.6%
Missouri 4	Ike Skelton	Democratic	1976	Incumbent re-elected.	▌ ✓ Ike Skelton (Democratic) 67.8%; ▌James Noland Jr. (Republican) 32.3%
Missouri 5	Alan Wheat	Democratic	1982	Incumbent retired to run for U.S. Senator. Democratic hold.	▌ ✓ Karen McCarthy (Democratic) 56.6%; ▌Ron Freeman (Republican) 43.4%
Missouri 6	Pat Danner	Democratic	1992	Incumbent re-elected.	▌ ✓ Pat Danner (Democratic) 66.1%; ▌Tina Tucker (Republican) 33.9%
Missouri 7	Mel Hancock	Republican	1988	Incumbent re-elected.	▌ ✓ Mel Hancock (Republican) 57.3%; ▌James R. Fossard (Democratic) 39.7%; ▌Doug Burlison (Libertarian) 3.0%
Missouri 8	Bill Emerson	Republican	1980	Incumbent re-elected.	▌ ✓ Bill Emerson (Republican) 70.1%; ▌James Thompson (Democratic) 26.6%; ▌Greg Tlapek (Libertarian) 3.4%
Missouri 9	Harold Volkmer	Democratic	1976	Incumbent re-elected.	▌ ✓ Harold Volkmer (Democratic) 50.5%; ▌Kenny Hulshof (Republican) 45.0%; ▌Mitchell J. Moore (Libertarian) 4.5%

== Montana ==
District	Incumbent			This race	
District	Representative	Party	First elected	Results	Candidates
Montana at-large	Pat Williams	Democratic	1978	Incumbent re-elected.	▌ ✓ Pat Williams (Democratic) 48.7%; ▌Cy Jamison (Republican) 42.2%; ▌Steve Kelly (Independent) 9.1%

== Nebraska ==
District	Incumbent			This race	
District	Representative	Party	First elected	Results	Candidates
Nebraska 1	Doug Bereuter	Republican	1978	Incumbent re-elected.	▌ ✓ Doug Bereuter (Republican) 62.6%; ▌Patrick Combs (Democratic) 37.3%
Nebraska 2	Peter Hoagland	Democratic	1988	Incumbent lost re-election. Republican gain.	▌ ✓ Jon Christensen (Republican) 49.9%; ▌Peter Hoagland (Democratic) 49.0%
Nebraska 3	Bill Barrett	Republican	1990	Incumbent re-elected.	▌ ✓ Bill Barrett (Republican) 78.7%; ▌Gil Chapin (Democratic) 21.3%

== Nevada ==
District	Incumbent			This race	
District	Representative	Party	First elected	Results	Candidates
Nevada 1	James Bilbray	Democratic	1986	Incumbent lost re-election. Republican gain.	▌ ✓ John Ensign (Republican) 48.5%; ▌James Bilbray (Democratic) 47.5%; ▌Gary Wood (Libertarian) 4.0%
Nevada 2	Barbara Vucanovich	Republican	1982	Incumbent re-elected.	▌ ✓ Barbara Vucanovich (Republican) 63.5%; ▌Janet Greeson (Democratic) 29.2%; ▌Thomas Jefferson (Independent American) 4.3%; ▌Lois Avery (Natural Law) 3.0%

== New Hampshire ==
District	Incumbent			This race	
District	Representative	Party	First elected	Results	Candidates
New Hampshire 1	Bill Zeliff	Republican	1990	Incumbent re-elected.	▌ ✓ Bill Zeliff (Republican) 65.6%; ▌Bill Verge (Democratic) 28.7%; ▌Scott Tosti (Independent) 2.8%; ▌Paul Lannon (Libertarian) 2.4%; ▌Merle Braley (Natural Law) 0.4%
New Hampshire 2	Richard N. Swett	Democratic	1990	Incumbent lost re-election. Republican gain.	▌ ✓ Charles Bass (Republican) 51.4%; ▌Richard N. Swett (Democratic) 46.0%; ▌John A. Lewicke (Libertarian) 1.8%; ▌Linda Spitzfaden (Natural Law) 0.8%

== New Jersey ==
District	Incumbent			This race	
District	Representative	Party	First elected	Results	Candidates
New Jersey 1	Rob Andrews	Democratic	1990	Incumbent re-elected.	▌ ✓ Rob Andrews (Democratic) 72.3%; ▌James N. Hogan (Republican) 27.7%
New Jersey 2	William J. Hughes	Democratic	1974	Incumbent retired. Republican gain.	▌ ✓ Frank LoBiondo (Republican) 64.6%; ▌Louis N. Magazzu (Democratic) 35.4%
New Jersey 3	Jim Saxton	Republican	1984	Incumbent re-elected.	▌ ✓ Jim Saxton (Republican) 66.4%; ▌James B. Smith (Democratic) 31.2%; ▌D. James Hill (United We Serve) 1.7%; ▌Arthur Fulvio Croce (Democracy in Action) 0.6%
New Jersey 4	Chris Smith	Republican	1980	Incumbent re-elected.	▌ ✓ Chris Smith (Republican) 67.9%; ▌Ralph Walsh (Democratic) 30.6%; ▌Leonard P. Marshall (Conservative) 1.0%; ▌Arnold Kokans (Natural Law) 0.5%
New Jersey 5	Marge Roukema	Republican	1980	Incumbent re-elected.	▌ ✓ Marge Roukema (Republican) 74.2%; ▌Bill Auer (Democratic) 21.9%; ▌William J. Leonard (Independent) 2.0%; ▌Roger W. Bacon (Libertarian) 1.5%; ▌Helen Hamilton (Natural Law) 0.3%
New Jersey 6	Frank Pallone	Democratic	1988	Incumbent re-elected.	▌ ✓ Frank Pallone (Democratic) 60.4%; ▌Mike Herson (Republican) 37.5%; ▌Charles H. Dickson (Independent) 1.2%; ▌Gary J. Rich (Conservative) 0.5%; ▌Richard Quinn (Natural Law) 0.4%
New Jersey 7	Bob Franks	Republican	1992	Incumbent re-elected.	▌ ✓ Bob Franks (Republican) 59.6%; ▌Karen Carroll (Democratic) 38.7%; ▌James J. Cleary (LaRouche) 1.4%; ▌Claire Greene (Natural Law) 0.3%
New Jersey 8	Herb Klein	Democratic	1992	Incumbent lost re-election. Republican gain.	▌ ✓ Bill Martini (Republican) 49.9%; ▌Herb Klein (Democratic) 48.6%; ▌Bernard George (Conservative) 1.6%
New Jersey 9	Robert Torricelli	Democratic	1982	Incumbent re-elected.	▌ ✓ Robert Torricelli (Democratic) 62.5%; ▌Peter J. Russo (Republican) 36.1%; ▌Gregory Pason (Independent) 0.9%; ▌Kenneth Ebel (Natural Law) 0.5%
New Jersey 10	Donald M. Payne	Democratic	1988	Incumbent re-elected.	▌ ✓ Donald M. Payne (Democratic) 75.9%; ▌Jim Ford (Republican) 21.9%; ▌Rose Monyek (Independent) 1.6%; ▌Maurice Williams (Socialist Workers) 0.6%
New Jersey 11	Dean Gallo	Republican	1984	Incumbent died November 6, 1994. Republican hold.	▌ ✓ Rodney Frelinghuysen (Republican) 71.2%; ▌Frank Herbert (Democratic) 28.0%; ▌Mary Frueholz (LaRouche) 0.6%; ▌Stuart Bacha (Independent) 0.2%
New Jersey 12	Dick Zimmer	Republican	1990	Incumbent re-elected.	▌ ✓ Dick Zimmer (Republican) 68.3%; ▌Joseph D. Youssouf (Democratic) 30.4%; ▌Anthony M. Provenzano (Conservative) 1.3%
New Jersey 13	Bob Menendez	Democratic	1992	Incumbent re-elected.	▌ ✓ Bob Menendez (Democratic) 70.9%; ▌Fernando A. Alonso (Republican) 25.2%; ▌Frank J. Rubino Jr. (We the People) 1.6%; ▌Herbert H. Shaw (Politicians are Crooks) 1.4%; ▌Steven Marshall (Socialist Workers) 0.9%

== New Mexico ==
District	Incumbent			This race	
District	Representative	Party	First elected	Results	Candidates
New Mexico 1	Steven Schiff	Republican	1988	Incumbent re-elected.	▌ ✓ Steven Schiff (Republican) 73.9%; ▌Peter L. Zollinger (Democratic) 26.1%
New Mexico 2	Joe Skeen	Republican	1980	Incumbent re-elected.	▌ ✓ Joe Skeen (Republican) 63.3%; ▌Benjamin Anthony Chavez (Democratic) 31.9%; ▌Rex R. Johnson (Green) 4.9%
New Mexico 3	Bill Richardson	Democratic	1982	Incumbent re-elected.	▌ ✓ Bill Richardson (Democratic) 63.6%; ▌F. Gregg Bemis Jr. (Republican) 34.1%; ▌Edward D. Nagel (Libertarian) 2.4%

== New York ==
District	Incumbent			This race	
District	Representative	Party	First elected	Results	Candidates
New York 1	George J. Hochbrueckner	Democratic	1986	Incumbent lost re-election. Republican gain.	▌ ✓ Michael Forbes (Republican) 52.5%; ▌George J. Hochbrueckner (Democratic) 46.5%; ▌Michael Strong (Fed Up) 0.9%
New York 2	Rick Lazio	Republican	1992	Incumbent re-elected.	▌ ✓ Rick Lazio (Republican) 68.2%; ▌Jame L. Manfre (Democratic) 28.0%; ▌Alice Cort Ross (Right to Life) 3.8%
New York 3	Peter King	Republican	1992	Incumbent re-elected.	▌ ✓ Peter King (Republican) 52.7%; ▌Norma Grill (Democratic) 35.6%; ▌John A. DePrima (Liberal) 0.7%
New York 4	David A. Levy	Republican	1992	Incumbent lost renomination. Republican hold.	▌ ✓ Dan Frisa (Republican) 50.2%; ▌Phil Schiliro (Democratic) 37.3%; ▌David A. Levy (Conservative) 8.7%; ▌Vincent P. Garbitelli (Right to Life) 3.0%; ▌Robert S. Berkowitz (Liberal) 0.8%
New York 5	Gary Ackerman	Democratic	1983	Incumbent re-elected.	▌ ✓ Gary Ackerman (Democratic) 55.0%; ▌Grant M. Lally (Republican) 43.3%; ▌Edward Elkowitz (Right to Life) 1.7%
New York 6	Floyd Flake	Democratic	1986	Incumbent re-elected.	▌ ✓ Floyd Flake (Democratic) 80.4%; ▌Denny Bhagwandin (Republican) 19.6%
New York 7	Thomas Manton	Democratic	1984	Incumbent re-elected.	▌ ✓ Thomas Manton (Democratic) 87.1%; ▌Robert E. Hurley (Conservative) 12.9%
New York 8	Jerry Nadler	Democratic	1992	Incumbent re-elected.	▌ ✓ Jerry Nadler (Democratic) 82.0%; ▌David L. Askren (Republican) 15.8%; ▌Margaret V. Byrnes (Conservative) 2.2%
New York 9	Chuck Schumer	Democratic	1980	Incumbent re-elected.	▌ ✓ Chuck Schumer (Democratic) 72.6%; ▌James P. McCall (Republican) 27.4%
New York 10	Edolphus Towns	Democratic	1982	Incumbent re-elected.	▌ ✓ Edolphus Towns (Democratic) 89.0%; ▌Amelia Smith-Parker (Republican) 9.2%; ▌Mildred K. Mahoney (Conservative) 1.7%
New York 11	Major Owens	Democratic	1982	Incumbent re-elected.	▌ ✓ Major Owens (Democratic) 88.9%; ▌Gary S. Popkin (Republican) 9.5%; ▌Michael Gaffney (Conservative) 1.7%
New York 12	Nydia Velázquez	Democratic	1992	Incumbent re-elected.	▌ ✓ Nydia Velázquez (Democratic) 92.3%; ▌Genevieve R. Brennan (Conservative) 6.4%; ▌Eric Ruano-Melendez (Perot) 1.4%
New York 13	Susan Molinari	Republican	1990	Incumbent re-elected.	▌ ✓ Susan Molinari (Republican) 71.4%; ▌Tyrone G. Butler (Democratic) 25.1%; ▌Elisa Disimone (Right to Life) 3.5%
New York 14	Carolyn Maloney	Democratic	1992	Incumbent re-elected.	▌ ✓ Carolyn Maloney (Democratic) 64.2%; ▌Charles Millard (Republican) 35.4%; ▌Thomas K. Leighton (Green) 0.4%
New York 15	Charles Rangel	Democratic	1970	Incumbent re-elected.	▌ ✓ Charles Rangel (Democratic) 96.5%; ▌Jose Augustin Suero (Right to Life) 3.5%
New York 16	José E. Serrano	Democratic	1990	Incumbent re-elected.	▌ ✓ José E. Serrano (Democratic) 96.3%; ▌Michael Walters (Conservative) 3.7%
New York 17	Eliot Engel	Democratic	1988	Incumbent re-elected.	▌ ✓ Eliot Engel (Democratic) 77.6%; ▌Edward T. Marshall (Republican) 17.9%; ▌Kevin Brawley (Conservative) 2.3%; ▌Ann M. Noonan (Right to Life) 2.2%
New York 18	Nita Lowey	Democratic	1988	Incumbent re-elected.	▌ ✓ Nita Lowey (Democratic) 57.3%; ▌Andrew C. Hartzell Jr. (Republican) 40.9%; ▌Florence T. O'Grady (Right to Life) 1.8%
New York 19	Hamilton Fish IV	Republican	1968	Incumbent retired. Republican hold.	▌ ✓ Sue Kelly (Republican) 52.1%; ▌Hamilton Fish V (Democratic) 36.8%; ▌Joe DioGuardi (Conservative) 10.3%; ▌Catherine Portman-Laux (Ax Taxes) 0.9%
New York 20	Benjamin Gilman	Republican	1972	Incumbent re-elected.	▌ ✓ Benjamin Gilman (Republican) 67.5%; ▌Gregory B. Julian (Democratic) 29.4%; ▌Lois M. Colandrea (Right to Life) 3.2%
New York 21	Michael McNulty	Democratic	1988	Incumbent re-elected.	▌ ✓ Michael McNulty (Democratic) 67.0%; ▌Joseph A. Gomez (Republican) 31.2%; ▌Timothy J. Wood (Right to Life) 1.9%
New York 22	Gerald Solomon	Republican	1978	Incumbent re-elected.	▌ ✓ Gerald Solomon (Republican) 73.4%; ▌L. Robert Lawrence Jr. (Democratic) 26.6%
New York 23	Sherwood Boehlert	Republican	1982	Incumbent re-elected.	▌ ✓ Sherwood Boehlert (Republican) 70.5%; ▌Charles W. Skeele Jr. (Democratic) 23.1%; ▌Donald J. Thomas (Right to Life) 6.4%
New York 24	John M. McHugh	Republican	1992	Incumbent re-elected.	▌ ✓ John M. McHugh (Republican) 78.6%; ▌Danny M. Francis (Democratic) 21.5%
New York 25	James T. Walsh	Republican	1988	Incumbent re-elected.	▌ ✓ James T. Walsh (Republican) 57.6%; ▌Rhea Jezer (Democratic) 42.4%
New York 26	Maurice Hinchey	Democratic	1992	Incumbent re-elected.	▌ ✓ Maurice Hinchey (Democratic) 49.1%; ▌Bob Moppert (Republican) 48.5%; ▌Tom Kovach (Right to Life) 2.5%
New York 27	Bill Paxon	Republican	1988	Incumbent re-elected.	▌ ✓ Bill Paxon (Republican) 74.5%; ▌William A. Long Jr. (Democratic) 25.5%
New York 28	Louise Slaughter	Democratic	1986	Incumbent re-elected.	▌ ✓ Louise Slaughter (Democratic) 56.7%; ▌Renee Forgensi Davison (Republican) 40.1%; ▌John Clendenin (Independence Fusion) 3.3%
New York 29	John LaFalce	Democratic	1974	Incumbent re-elected.	▌ ✓ John LaFalce (Democratic) 55.2%; ▌William E. Miller Jr. (Republican) 43.0%; ▌Patrick Murty (Right to Life) 1.8%
New York 30	Jack Quinn	Republican	1992	Incumbent re-elected.	▌ ✓ Jack Quinn (Republican) 67.0%; ▌David A. Franczyk (Democratic) 33.0%
New York 31	Amo Houghton	Republican	1986	Incumbent re-elected.	▌ ✓ Amo Houghton (Republican) 84.8%; ▌Gretchen S. McManus (Right to Life) 15.2%

== North Carolina ==
District	Incumbent			This race	
District	Representative	Party	First elected	Results	Candidates
North Carolina 1	Eva Clayton	Democratic	1992	Incumbent re-elected.	▌ ✓ Eva Clayton (Democratic) 61.1%; ▌Ted Tyler (Republican) 38.9%
North Carolina 2	Tim Valentine	Democratic	1982	Incumbent retired. Republican gain.	▌ ✓ David Funderburk (Republican) 56.0%; ▌Richard H. Moore (Democratic) 44.0%
North Carolina 3	Martin Lancaster	Democratic	1986	Incumbent lost re-election. Republican gain.	▌ ✓ Walter B. Jones Jr. (Republican) 52.7%; ▌Martin Lancaster (Democratic) 47.3%
North Carolina 4	David Price	Democratic	1986	Incumbent lost re-election. Republican gain.	▌ ✓ Fred Heineman (Republican) 50.4%; ▌David Price (Democratic) 49.6%
North Carolina 5	Stephen L. Neal	Democratic	1974	Incumbent retired. Republican gain.	▌ ✓ Richard Burr (Republican) 57.3%; ▌A. P. Sands (Democratic) 42.7%
North Carolina 6	Howard Coble	Republican	1984	Incumbent re-elected.	▌ ✓ Howard Coble (Republican); Uncontested
North Carolina 7	Charlie Rose	Democratic	1972	Incumbent re-elected.	▌ ✓ Charlie Rose (Democratic) 51.6%; ▌Robert C. Anderson (Republican) 48.4%
North Carolina 8	Bill Hefner	Democratic	1974	Incumbent re-elected.	▌ ✓ Bill Hefner (Democratic) 52.4%; ▌Sherrill Morgan (Republican) 47.6%
North Carolina 9	Alex McMillan	Republican	1984	Incumbent retired. Republican hold.	▌ ✓ Sue Myrick (Republican) 65.0%; ▌Rory Blake (Democratic) 35.0%
North Carolina 10	Cass Ballenger	Republican	1986	Incumbent re-elected.	▌ ✓ Cass Ballenger (Republican) 71.5%; ▌Robert Wayne Avery (Democratic) 28.5%
North Carolina 11	Charles Taylor	Republican	1990	Incumbent re-elected.	▌ ✓ Charles Taylor (Republican) 60.1%; ▌Maggie Palmer Lauterer (Democratic) 39.9%
North Carolina 12	Mel Watt	Democratic	1992	Incumbent re-elected.	▌ ✓ Mel Watt (Democratic) 65.8%; ▌Joseph A. Martino (Republican) 34.2%

== North Dakota ==
District	Incumbent			This race	
District	Representative	Party	First elected	Results	Candidates
North Dakota at-large	Earl Pomeroy	Democratic-NPL	1992	Incumbent re-elected.	▌ ✓ Earl Pomeroy (Democratic-NPL) 52.3%; ▌Gary Porter (Republican) 45.0%; ▌James Germalic (Independent) 2.7%

== Ohio ==
District	Incumbent			This race	
District	Representative	Party	First elected	Results	Candidates
Ohio 1	David S. Mann	Democratic	1992	Incumbent lost re-election. Republican gain.	▌ ✓ Steve Chabot (Republican) 56.1%; ▌David S. Mann (Democratic) 43.9%
Ohio 2	Rob Portman	Republican	1993	Incumbent re-elected.	▌ ✓ Rob Portman (Republican) 77.6%; ▌Les Mann (Democratic) 22.4%
Ohio 3	Tony P. Hall	Democratic	1978	Incumbent re-elected.	▌ ✓ Tony P. Hall (Democratic) 59.3%; ▌David A. Westbrock (Republican) 40.7%
Ohio 4	Mike Oxley	Republican	1981	Incumbent re-elected.	▌ ✓ Mike Oxley (Republican); Uncontested
Ohio 5	Paul Gillmor	Republican	1988	Incumbent re-elected.	▌ ✓ Paul Gillmor (Republican) 73.4%; ▌Jarrod Tudor (Democratic) 26.6%
Ohio 6	Ted Strickland	Democratic	1992	Incumbent lost re-election. Republican gain.	▌ ✓ Frank Cremeans (Republican) 50.9%; ▌Ted Strickland (Democratic) 49.1%
Ohio 7	Dave Hobson	Republican	1991	Incumbent re-elected.	▌ ✓ Dave Hobson (Republican); Uncontested
Ohio 8	John Boehner	Republican	1990	Incumbent re-elected.	▌ ✓ John Boehner (Republican); Uncontested
Ohio 9	Marcy Kaptur	Democratic	1982	Incumbent re-elected.	▌ ✓ Marcy Kaptur (Democratic) 75.3%; ▌Randy Whitman (Republican) 24.7%
Ohio 10	Martin Hoke	Republican	1992	Incumbent re-elected.	▌ ✓ Martin Hoke (Republican) 51.9%; ▌Francis E. Gaul (Democratic) 38.6%; ▌Joseph J. Jacobs Jr. (Independent) 9.5%
Ohio 11	Louis Stokes	Democratic	1968	Incumbent re-elected.	▌ ✓ Louis Stokes (Democratic) 77.2%; ▌James J. Sykora (Republican) 22.8%
Ohio 12	John Kasich	Republican	1982	Incumbent re-elected.	▌ ✓ John Kasich (Republican) 66.5%; ▌Cynthia L. Ruccia (Democratic) 33.2%
Ohio 13	Sherrod Brown	Democratic	1992	Incumbent re-elected.	▌ ✓ Sherrod Brown (Democratic) 49.1%; ▌Gregory A. White (Republican) 45.5%; ▌Howard Mason (Independent) 4.1%; ▌John Michael Ryan (Independent) 1.3%
Ohio 14	Tom Sawyer	Democratic	1986	Incumbent re-elected.	▌ ✓ Tom Sawyer (Democratic) 51.9%; ▌Lynn Slaby (Republican) 48.1%
Ohio 15	Deborah Pryce	Republican	1992	Incumbent re-elected.	▌ ✓ Deborah Pryce (Republican) 70.7%; ▌Bill Buckel (Democratic) 29.1%
Ohio 16	Ralph Regula	Republican	1972	Incumbent re-elected.	▌ ✓ Ralph Regula (Republican) 75.0%; ▌J. Michael Finn (Democratic) 25.0%
Ohio 17	James Traficant	Democratic	1984	Incumbent re-elected.	▌ ✓ James Traficant (Democratic) 77.4%; ▌Mike G. Meister (Republican) 22.6%
Ohio 18	Douglas Applegate	Democratic	1976	Incumbent retired. Republican gain.	▌ ✓ Bob Ney (Republican) 54.0%; ▌Greg DiDonato (Democratic) 46.0%
Ohio 19	Eric Fingerhut	Democratic	1992	Incumbent lost re-election. Republican gain.	▌ ✓ Steve LaTourette (Republican) 48.5%; ▌Eric Fingerhut (Democratic) 43.5%; ▌Ron Young (Independent) 5.5%; ▌Jerome A. Brentar (Independent) 2.5%

== Oklahoma ==
District	Incumbent			This race	
District	Representative	Party	First elected	Results	Candidates
Oklahoma 1	Jim Inhofe	Republican	1986	Incumbent retired to run for U.S. Senator. Republican hold.	▌ ✓ Steve Largent (Republican) 62.7%; ▌Stuart Price (Democratic) 37.3%
Oklahoma 2	Mike Synar	Democratic	1978	Incumbent lost renomination. Republican gain.	▌ ✓ Tom Coburn (Republican) 52.1%; ▌Virgil R. Cooper (Democratic) 47.9%
Oklahoma 3	Bill Brewster	Democratic	1990	Incumbent re-elected.	▌ ✓ Bill Brewster (Democratic) 73.8%; ▌Darrel Dewayne Tallant (Republican) 26.2%
Oklahoma 4	Dave McCurdy	Democratic	1980	Incumbent retired to run for U.S. Senator. Republican gain.	▌ ✓ J. C. Watts (Republican) 51.6%; ▌David Perryman (Democratic) 43.3%; ▌Bill Tiffee (Independent) 5.1%
Oklahoma 5	Ernest Istook	Republican	1992	Incumbent re-elected.	▌ ✓ Ernest Istook (Republican) 78.1%; ▌Tom Keith (Democratic) 21.9%
Oklahoma 6	Frank Lucas	Republican	1994	Incumbent re-elected.	▌ ✓ Frank Lucas (Republican) 70.2%; ▌Jeffrey S. Tollett (Democratic) 29.8%

== Oregon ==
District	Incumbent			This race	
District	Representative	Party	First elected	Results	Candidates
Oregon 1	Elizabeth Furse	Democratic	1992	Incumbent re-elected.	▌ ✓ Elizabeth Furse (Democratic) 47.7%; ▌Bill Witt (Republican) 47.6%; ▌Brewster Gillett (American) 2.6%; ▌Daniel E. Wilson (Libertarian) 2.0%
Oregon 2	Bob Smith	Republican	1982	Incumbent retired. Republican hold.	▌ ✓ Wes Cooley (Republican) 57.3%; ▌Sue C. Kupillas (Democratic) 38.7%; ▌Gary L. Sublett (Libertarian) 3.9%
Oregon 3	Ron Wyden	Democratic	1980	Incumbent re-elected.	▌ ✓ Ron Wyden (Democratic) 72.5%; ▌Everett Hall (Republican) 19.4%; ▌Mark Brunelle (Independent) 6.1%; ▌Gene Nanni (Libertarian) 1.9%
Oregon 4	Peter DeFazio	Democratic	1986	Incumbent re-elected.	▌ ✓ Peter DeFazio (Democratic) 66.8%; ▌John D. Newkirk (Republican) 33.2%
Oregon 5	Mike Kopetski	Democratic	1990	Incumbent retired. Republican gain.	▌ ✓ Jim Bunn (Republican) 49.8%; ▌Catherine Webber (Democratic) 46.8%; ▌Jon E. Zimmer (Libertarian) 3.3%

== Pennsylvania ==
District	Incumbent			This race	
District	Representative	Party	First elected	Results	Candidates
Pennsylvania 1	Thomas M. Foglietta	Democratic	1980	Incumbent re-elected.	▌ ✓ Thomas M. Foglietta (Democratic) 81.5%; ▌Roger F. Gordon (Republican) 18.5%
Pennsylvania 2	Lucien Blackwell	Democratic	1990	Incumbent lost renomination. Democratic hold.	▌ ✓ Chaka Fattah (Democratic) 85.9%; ▌Lawrence R. Watson (Republican) 14.1%
Pennsylvania 3	Robert Borski	Democratic	1982	Incumbent re-elected.	▌ ✓ Robert Borski (Democratic) 62.7%; ▌James C. Hasher (Republican) 37.3%
Pennsylvania 4	Ron Klink	Democratic	1992	Incumbent re-elected.	▌ ✓ Ron Klink (Democratic) 64.2%; ▌Ed Peglow (Republican) 35.8%
Pennsylvania 5	William Clinger	Republican	1978	Incumbent re-elected.	▌ ✓ William Clinger (Republican); Uncontested
Pennsylvania 6	Tim Holden	Democratic	1992	Incumbent re-elected.	▌ ✓ Tim Holden (Democratic) 56.7%; ▌Frederick C. Levering (Republican) 43.3%
Pennsylvania 7	Curt Weldon	Republican	1986	Incumbent re-elected.	▌ ✓ Curt Weldon (Republican) 69.7%; ▌Sara R. Nichols (Democratic) 30.3%
Pennsylvania 8	Jim Greenwood	Republican	1992	Incumbent re-elected.	▌ ✓ Jim Greenwood (Republican) 66.1%; ▌John P. Murray (Democratic) 26.7%; ▌Jay Timothy Russell (Libertarian) 4.7%; ▌Robert J. Cash (Independent) 2.5%
Pennsylvania 9	Bud Shuster	Republican	1972	Incumbent re-elected.	▌ ✓ Bud Shuster (Republican); Uncontested
Pennsylvania 10	Joseph M. McDade	Republican	1962	Incumbent re-elected.	▌ ✓ Joseph M. McDade (Republican) 65.7%; ▌Daniel J. Schreffler (Democratic) 31.1%; ▌Albert A. Smith (Libertarian) 3.2%
Pennsylvania 11	Paul Kanjorski	Democratic	1984	Incumbent re-elected.	▌ ✓ Paul Kanjorski (Democratic) 66.5%; ▌J. Andrew Podolak (Republican) 33.5%
Pennsylvania 12	John Murtha	Democratic	1974	Incumbent re-elected.	▌ ✓ John Murtha (Democratic) 68.9%; ▌Bill Choby (Republican) 31.1%
Pennsylvania 13	Marjorie Margolies-Mezvinsky	Democratic	1992	Incumbent lost re-election. Republican gain.	▌ ✓ Jon D. Fox (Republican) 49.4%; ▌Marjorie Margolies-Mezvinsky (Democratic) 45.2%; ▌Lee D. Hustead (Libertarian) 3.7%; ▌Frank W. Szabo (Independent) 1.7%
Pennsylvania 14	William J. Coyne	Democratic	1980	Incumbent re-elected.	▌ ✓ William J. Coyne (Democratic) 64.1%; ▌John Robert Clark (Republican) 32.4%; ▌Edward L. Stewart (Independent) 2.3%; ▌Paul Scherrer (Independent) 1.1%
Pennsylvania 15	Paul McHale	Democratic	1992	Incumbent re-elected.	▌ ✓ Paul McHale (Democratic) 47.8%; ▌Jim Yeager (Republican) 47.4%; ▌Victor J. Mazziotti (Patriot) 4.8%
Pennsylvania 16	Bob Walker	Republican	1976	Incumbent re-elected.	▌ ✓ Bob Walker (Republican) 69.7%; ▌Bill Chertok (Democratic) 30.3%
Pennsylvania 17	George Gekas	Republican	1982	Incumbent re-elected.	▌ ✓ George Gekas (Republican); Uncontested
Pennsylvania 18	Rick Santorum	Republican	1990	Incumbent retired to run for U.S. Senator. Democratic gain.	▌ ✓ Mike Doyle (Democratic) 54.8%; ▌John McCarty (Republican) 45.2%
Pennsylvania 19	Bill Goodling	Republican	1974	Incumbent re-elected.	▌ ✓ Bill Goodling (Republican); Uncontested
Pennsylvania 20	Austin Murphy	Democratic	1976	Incumbent retired. Democratic hold.	▌ ✓ Frank Mascara (Democratic) 53.1%; ▌Mike McCormick (Republican) 46.9%
Pennsylvania 21	Tom Ridge	Republican	1982	Incumbent retired to run for Governor of Pennsylvania. Republican hold.	▌ ✓ Phil English (Republican) 49.5%; ▌Bill Leavens (Democratic) 46.9%; ▌Arthur E. Drew (Independent) 3.6%

== Rhode Island ==
District	Incumbent			This race	
District	Representative	Party	First elected	Results	Candidates
Rhode Island 1	Ronald Machtley	Republican	1988	Incumbent retired to run for Governor of Rhode Island. Democratic gain.	▌ ✓ Patrick J. Kennedy (Democratic) 54.1%; ▌Kevin Vigilante (Republican) 45.9%
Rhode Island 2	Jack Reed	Democratic	1990	Incumbent re-elected.	▌ ✓ Jack Reed (Democratic) 68.0%; ▌A. John Elliot (Republican) 32.0%

== South Carolina ==
District	Incumbent			This race	
District	Representative	Party	First elected	Results	Candidates
South Carolina 1	Arthur Ravenel Jr.	Republican	1986	Incumbent retired to run for Governor of South Carolina. Republican hold.	▌ ✓ Mark Sanford (Republican) 66.3%; ▌Robert Barber (Democratic) 32.4%; ▌Robert Payne (Libertarian) 1.2%
South Carolina 2	Floyd Spence	Republican	1970	Incumbent re-elected.	▌ ✓ Floyd Spence (Republican); Uncontested
South Carolina 3	Butler Derrick	Democratic	1974	Incumbent retired. Republican gain.	▌ ✓ Lindsey Graham (Republican) 60.1%; ▌James E. Bryan Jr. (Democratic) 39.9%
South Carolina 4	Bob Inglis	Republican	1992	Incumbent re-elected.	▌ ✓ Bob Inglis (Republican) 73.5%; ▌Jerry L. Fowler (Democratic) 26.4%
South Carolina 5	John Spratt	Democratic	1982	Incumbent re-elected.	▌ ✓ John Spratt (Democratic) 52.1%; ▌Larry Bigham (Republican) 47.8%
South Carolina 6	Jim Clyburn	Democratic	1992	Incumbent re-elected.	▌ ✓ Jim Clyburn (Democratic) 63.8%; ▌Gary McLeod (Republican) 36.2%

== South Dakota ==
District	Incumbent			This race	
District	Representative	Party	First elected	Results	Candidates
South Dakota at-large	Tim Johnson	Democratic	1986	Incumbent re-elected.	▌ ✓ Tim Johnson (Democratic) 59.8%; ▌Jan Berkhout (Republican) 36.6%; ▌Ronald Wieczorek (Independent) 3.5%

== Tennessee ==
District	Incumbent			This race	
District	Representative	Party	First elected	Results	Candidates
Tennessee 1	Jimmy Quillen	Republican	1962	Incumbent re-elected.	▌ ✓ Jimmy Quillen (Republican) 72.9%; ▌J. Carr Christian (Democratic) 24.6%; ▌George Mauer (Independent) 2.5%
Tennessee 2	Jimmy Duncan	Republican	1988	Incumbent re-elected.	▌ ✓ Jimmy Duncan (Republican) 90.5%; ▌Randon J. Krieg (Independent) 4.8%; ▌Greg Samples (Independent) 4.7%
Tennessee 3	Marilyn Lloyd	Democratic	1974	Incumbent retired. Republican gain.	▌ ✓ Zach Wamp (Republican) 52.3%; ▌Randy Button (Democratic) 45.6%; ▌Thomas Ed Morrrell (Independent) 1.2%; ▌Richard M. Sims (Independent) 0.9%
Tennessee 4	Jim Cooper	Democratic	1982	Incumbent retired to run for U.S. Senator. Republican gain.	▌ ✓ Van Hilleary (Republican) 56.6%; ▌Jeff Whorley (Democratic) 42.0%; ▌J. Patrick Lyons (Independent) 1.4%
Tennessee 5	Bob Clement	Democratic	1988	Incumbent re-elected.	▌ ✓ Bob Clement (Democratic) 60.2%; ▌John Osborne (Republican) 38.7%; Others: ▌Lloyd Botway (Independent) 0.6%; ▌Chuck Lokey (Independent) 0.4%
Tennessee 6	Bart Gordon	Democratic	1984	Incumbent re-elected.	▌ ✓ Bart Gordon (Democratic) 50.6%; ▌Steve Gill (Republican) 49.4%
Tennessee 7	Don Sundquist	Republican	1982	Incumbent retired to run for Governor of Tennessee. Republican hold.	▌ ✓ Ed Bryant (Republican) 60.2%; ▌Harold Byrd (Democratic) 38.6%; ▌Tom Jeanette (Independent) 1.1%
Tennessee 8	John Tanner	Democratic	1988	Incumbent re-elected.	▌ ✓ John Tanner (Democratic) 63.8%; ▌Neal R. Morris (Republican) 36.2%
Tennessee 9	Harold Ford Sr.	Democratic	1974	Incumbent re-elected.	▌ ✓ Harold Ford Sr. (Democratic) 57.8%; ▌Roderick DeBerry (Republican) 42.2%

== Texas ==
District	Incumbent			This race	
District	Representative	Party	First elected	Results	Candidates
Texas 1	Jim Chapman	Democratic	1985	Incumbent re-elected.	▌ ✓ Jim Chapman (Democratic) 55.3%; ▌Mike Blankenship (Republican) 40.9%; ▌Thomas Mosser (Independent) 3.8%
Texas 2	Charles Wilson	Democratic	1972	Incumbent re-elected.	▌ ✓ Charles Wilson (Democratic) 57.0%; ▌Donna Peterson (Republican) 43.0%
Texas 3	Sam Johnson	Republican	1991	Incumbent re-elected.	▌ ✓ Sam Johnson (Republican) 91.0%; ▌Tom Donahue (Libertarian) 9.0%
Texas 4	Ralph Hall	Democratic	1980	Incumbent re-elected.	▌ ✓ Ralph Hall (Democratic) 58.8%; ▌David L. Bridges (Republican) 39.8%; ▌Steven Rothacker (Libertarian) 1.4%
Texas 5	John Bryant	Democratic	1982	Incumbent re-elected.	▌ ✓ John Bryant (Democratic) 50.1%; ▌Pete Sessions (Republican) 47.3%; ▌Barbara Morgan (Independent) 1.4%; Others: ▌Noel Kopala (Libertarian) 0.7%; ▌Regina Arashvand (Independent) 0.5%
Texas 6	Joe Barton	Republican	1984	Incumbent re-elected.	▌ ✓ Joe Barton (Republican) 75.6%; ▌Terry Jesmore (Democratic) 22.0%; ▌Bill Baird (Libertarian) 2.3%
Texas 7	Bill Archer	Republican	1970	Incumbent re-elected.	▌ ✓ Bill Archer (Republican); Uncontested
Texas 8	Jack Fields	Republican	1980	Incumbent re-elected.	▌ ✓ Jack Fields (Republican) 92.0%; ▌Russ Klecka (Independent) 8.0%
Texas 9	Jack Brooks	Democratic	1952	Incumbent lost re-election. Republican gain.	▌ ✓ Steve Stockman (Republican) 51.9%; ▌Jack Brooks (Democratic) 45.7%; ▌Bill Felton (Independent) 1.4%; ▌Darla K. Beenau (Libertarian) 1.1%
Texas 10	J. J. Pickle	Democratic	1963	Incumbent retired. Democratic hold.	▌ ✓ Lloyd Doggett (Democratic) 56.3%; ▌Jo Baylor (Republican) 39.8%; ▌Jeff Hill (Libertarian) 1.5%; ▌Michael L. Brandes (Independent) 1.3%; ▌Jeff Davis (Independent) 1.2%
Texas 11	Chet Edwards	Democratic	1990	Incumbent re-elected.	▌ ✓ Chet Edwards (Democratic) 59.2%; ▌James W. Broyles (Republican) 40.8%
Texas 12	Pete Geren	Democratic	1989	Incumbent re-elected.	▌ ✓ Pete Geren (Democratic) 68.7%; ▌Ernest J. Anderson Jr. (Republican) 31.3%
Texas 13	Bill Sarpalius	Democratic	1988	Incumbent lost re-election. Republican gain.	▌ ✓ Mac Thornberry (Republican) 55.4%; ▌Bill Sarpalius (Democratic) 44.6%
Texas 14	Greg Laughlin	Democratic	1992	Incumbent re-elected.	▌ ✓ Greg Laughlin (Democratic) 55.6%; ▌Jim Deats (Republican) 44.4%
Texas 15	Kika de la Garza	Democratic	1964	Incumbent re-elected.	▌ ✓ Kika de la Garza (Democratic) 59.0%; ▌Tom Haughey (Republican) 39.4%; ▌John Hamilton (Independent) 1.6%
Texas 16	Ron Coleman	Democratic	1982	Incumbent re-elected.	▌ ✓ Ron Coleman (Democratic) 57.1%; ▌Bobby Ortiz (Republican) 42.9%
Texas 17	Charles Stenholm	Democratic	1978	Incumbent re-elected.	▌ ✓ Charles Stenholm (Democratic) 53.6%; ▌Phil Boone (Republican) 46.3%
Texas 18	Craig Washington	Democratic	1989	Incumbent lost renomination. Democratic hold.	▌ ✓ Sheila Jackson Lee (Democratic) 73.5%; ▌Jerry Burley (Republican) 24.4%; ▌J. Larry Snellings (Independent) 1.1%; ▌George M. Hollenbeck (Libertarian) 1.0%
Texas 19	Larry Combest	Republican	1984	Incumbent re-elected.	▌ ✓ Larry Combest (Republican); Uncontested
Texas 20	Henry B. González	Democratic	1961	Incumbent re-elected.	▌ ✓ Henry B. González (Democratic) 62.5%; ▌Carl Bill Colyer (Republican) 37.5%
Texas 21	Lamar Smith	Republican	1986	Incumbent re-elected.	▌ ✓ Lamar Smith (Republican) 90.0%; ▌Kerry L. Lowry (Independent) 10.0%
Texas 22	Tom DeLay	Republican	1984	Incumbent re-elected.	▌ ✓ Tom DeLay (Republican) 73.7%; ▌Scott D. Cunningham (Democratic) 23.8%; ▌Gregory D. Pepper (Independent) 2.5%
Texas 23	Henry Bonilla	Republican	1992	Incumbent re-elected.	▌ ✓ Henry Bonilla (Republican) 62.6%; ▌Rolando L. Rios (Democratic) 37.4%
Texas 24	Martin Frost	Democratic	1978	Incumbent re-elected.	▌ ✓ Martin Frost (Democratic) 52.8%; ▌Ed Harrison (Republican) 47.2%
Texas 25	Michael A. Andrews	Democratic	1982	Incumbent retired to run for U.S. Senator. Democratic hold.	▌ ✓ Ken Bentsen (Democratic) 52.3%; ▌Gene Fontenot (Republican) 45.0%; ▌Sarah Klein-Tower (Independent) 1.7%; ▌Robert F. Lockhart (Libertarian) 1.0%
Texas 26	Dick Armey	Republican	1984	Incumbent re-elected.	▌ ✓ Dick Armey (Republican) 76.4%; ▌LeEarl Ann Bryant (Democratic) 22.4%; ▌Alfred Adask (Libertarian) 1.1%
Texas 27	Solomon Ortiz	Democratic	1982	Incumbent re-elected.	▌ ✓ Solomon Ortiz (Democratic) 59.4%; ▌Erol A. Stone (Republican) 40.1%
Texas 28	Frank Tejeda	Democratic	1992	Incumbent re-elected.	▌ ✓ Frank Tejeda (Democratic) 70.9%; ▌David C. Slatter (Republican) 27.6%; ▌Stephan Rothstein (Libertarian) 1.5%
Texas 29	Gene Green	Democratic	1992	Incumbent re-elected.	▌ ✓ Gene Green (Democratic) 73.4%; ▌Harold Eide (Republican) 26.6%
Texas 30	Eddie Bernice Johnson	Democratic	1992	Incumbent re-elected.	▌ ✓ Eddie Bernice Johnson (Democratic) 72.6%; ▌Lucy Cain (Republican) 25.7%; ▌Ken Ashby (Libertarian) 1.7%

== Utah ==
District	Incumbent			This race	
District	Representative	Party	First elected	Results	Candidates
Utah 1	Jim Hansen	Republican	1980	Incumbent re-elected.	▌ ✓ Jim Hansen (Republican) 64.5%; ▌Bobbie Coray (Democratic) 35.5%
Utah 2	Karen Shepherd	Democratic	1992	Incumbent lost re-election. Republican gain.	▌ ✓ Enid Greene Waldholtz (Republican) 45.8%; ▌Karen Shepherd (Democratic) 35.9%; ▌Merrill Cook (Independent) 18.3%
Utah 3	Bill Orton	Democratic	1990	Incumbent re-elected.	▌ ✓ Bill Orton (Democratic) 59.0%; ▌Dixie Thompson (Republican) 39.9%; ▌Barbara Greenway (Socialist Workers) 1.2%

== Vermont ==
District	Incumbent			This race	
District	Representative	Party	First elected	Results	Candidates
Vermont at-large	Bernie Sanders	Independent	1990	Incumbent re-elected.	▌ ✓ Bernie Sanders (Independent) 49.9%; ▌John Carroll (Republican) 46.6%; ▌Carole Banus (Natural Law) 1.4%; ▌Jack Rogers (Grassroots) 1.3%; ▌Annette Larson (Liberty Union) 0.7%

== Virginia ==
District	Incumbent			This race	
District	Representative	Party	First elected	Results	Candidates
Virginia 1	Herb Bateman	Republican	1982	Incumbent re-elected.	▌ ✓ Herb Bateman (Republican) 74.3%; ▌Mary F. Sinclair (Democratic) 23.5%; ▌Matt B. Voorhees (Independent) 2.3%
Virginia 2	Owen B. Pickett	Democratic	1986	Incumbent re-elected.	▌ ✓ Owen B. Pickett (Democratic) 59.0%; ▌J. L. Chapman (Republican) 40.9%
Virginia 3	Bobby Scott	Democratic	1992	Incumbent re-elected.	▌ ✓ Bobby Scott (Democratic) 79.4%; ▌Thomas E. Ward (Republican) 20.6%
Virginia 4	Norman Sisisky	Democratic	1982	Incumbent re-elected.	▌ ✓ Norman Sisisky (Democratic) 61.6%; ▌A. George Sweet III (Republican) 38.4%
Virginia 5	Lewis F. Payne Jr.	Democratic	1988	Incumbent re-elected.	▌ ✓ Lewis F. Payne Jr. (Democratic) 53.3%; ▌George Landrith (Republican) 46.7%
Virginia 6	Bob Goodlatte	Republican	1992	Incumbent re-elected.	▌ ✓ Bob Goodlatte (Republican); Uncontested
Virginia 7	Thomas J. Bliley Jr.	Republican	1980	Incumbent re-elected.	▌ ✓ Thomas J. Bliley Jr. (Republican) 84.0%; ▌Gerald E. Berg (Independent) 15.8%
Virginia 8	Jim Moran	Democratic	1990	Incumbent re-elected.	▌ ✓ Jim Moran (Democratic) 59.3%; ▌Kyle E. McSlarrow (Republican) 39.3%; Others: ▌Ward Edmonds (Independent) 0.9%; ▌William C. Jones (Independent) 0.4%
Virginia 9	Rick Boucher	Democratic	1982	Incumbent re-elected.	▌ ✓ Rick Boucher (Democratic) 58.8%; ▌S. H. Fast (Republican) 41.2%
Virginia 10	Frank Wolf	Republican	1980	Incumbent re-elected.	▌ ✓ Frank Wolf (Republican) 87.3%; ▌Alan Ogden (Independent) 7.8%; ▌Robert Rilee (Independent) 0.2%
Virginia 11	Leslie Byrne	Democratic	1992	Incumbent lost re-election. Republican gain.	▌ ✓ Tom Davis (Republican) 52.9%; ▌Leslie Byrne (Democratic) 45.3%; ▌Gordon Cruickshank (Independent) 1.7%

== Washington ==
District	Incumbent			This race	
District	Representative	Party	First elected	Results	Candidates
Washington 1	Maria Cantwell	Democratic	1992	Incumbent lost re-election. Republican gain.	▌ ✓ Rick White (Republican) 51.7%; ▌Maria Cantwell (Democratic) 48.3%
Washington 2	Al Swift	Democratic	1978	Incumbent retired. Republican gain.	▌ ✓ Jack Metcalf (Republican) 54.7%; ▌Harriet Spanel (Democratic) 45.3%
Washington 3	Jolene Unsoeld	Democratic	1988	Incumbent lost re-election. Republican gain.	▌ ✓ Linda Smith (Republican) 52.0%; ▌Jolene Unsoeld (Democratic) 44.6%; ▌Caitlin Davis Carlson (Gun Control) 3.4%
Washington 4	Jay Inslee	Democratic	1992	Incumbent lost re-election. Republican gain.	▌ ✓ Doc Hastings (Republican) 53.3%; ▌Jay Inslee (Democratic) 46.7%
Washington 5	Tom Foley	Democratic	1964	Incumbent lost re-election. Republican gain.	▌ ✓ George Nethercutt (Republican) 50.9%; ▌Tom Foley (Democratic) 49.1%
Washington 6	Norm Dicks	Democratic	1976	Incumbent re-elected.	▌ ✓ Norm Dicks (Democratic) 58.3%; ▌Benjamin Gregg (Republican) 41.7%
Washington 7	Jim McDermott	Democratic	1988	Incumbent re-elected.	▌ ✓ Jim McDermott (Democratic) 75.1%; ▌Keith Harris (Republican) 24.9%
Washington 8	Jennifer Dunn	Republican	1992	Incumbent re-elected.	▌ ✓ Jennifer Dunn (Republican) 76.1%; ▌Jim Wyrick (Democratic) 23.9%
Washington 9	Mike Kreidler	Democratic	1992	Incumbent lost re-election. Republican gain.	▌ ✓ Randy Tate (Republican) 51.8%; ▌Mike Kreidler (Democratic) 48.2%

== West Virginia ==
District	Incumbent			This race	
District	Representative	Party	First elected	Results	Candidates
West Virginia 1	Alan Mollohan	Democratic	1982	Incumbent re-elected.	▌ ✓ Alan Mollohan (Democratic) 70.3%; ▌Sally Rossy Riley (Republican) 29.7%
West Virginia 2	Bob Wise	Democratic	1982	Incumbent re-elected.	▌ ✓ Bob Wise (Democratic) 63.7%; ▌Samuel A. Cravotta (Republican) 36.3%
West Virginia 3	Nick Rahall	Democratic	1976	Incumbent re-elected.	▌ ✓ Nick Rahall (Democratic) 63.9%; ▌Ben Waldman (Republican) 36.1%

== Wisconsin ==
District	Incumbent			This race	
District	Representative	Party	First elected	Results	Candidates
Wisconsin 1	Peter W. Barca	Democratic	1993 (Special)	Incumbent lost re-election. Republican gain.	▌ ✓ Mark Neumann (Republican) 49.4%; ▌Peter W. Barca (Democratic) 48.8%; ▌Edward Kozak (Libertarian) 1.8%
Wisconsin 2	Scott Klug	Republican	1990	Incumbent re-elected.	▌ ✓ Scott Klug (Republican) 69.2%; ▌Thomas Hecht (Democratic) 28.7%; ▌John Stumpf (US Taxpayers) 1.4%; ▌Joseph Schumacher (Independent) 0.7%
Wisconsin 3	Steve Gunderson	Republican	1980	Incumbent re-elected.	▌ ✓ Steve Gunderson (Republican) 55.7%; ▌Harvey Stower (Democratic) 41.0%; ▌Chuck Lee (US Taxpayers) 1.8%; ▌Mark Weinhold (Independent) 1.4%
Wisconsin 4	Jerry Kleczka	Democratic	1984	Incumbent re-elected.	▌ ✓ Jerry Kleczka (Democratic) 53.7%; ▌Thomas G. Reynolds (Republican) 44.8%; ▌James Harold Hause (Taxpayers) 1.5%
Wisconsin 5	Tom Barrett	Democratic	1992	Incumbent re-elected.	▌ ✓ Tom Barrett (Democratic) 62.4%; ▌Stephen Hollingshead (Republican) 36.4%; ▌David Schall (Independent) 1.1%
Wisconsin 6	Tom Petri	Republican	1979 (Special)	Incumbent re-elected.	▌ ✓ Tom Petri (Republican); Uncontested
Wisconsin 7	Dave Obey	Democratic	1969 (Special)	Incumbent re-elected.	▌ ✓ Dave Obey (Democratic) 54.3%; ▌Scott West (Republican) 45.7%
Wisconsin 8	Toby Roth	Republican	1978	Incumbent re-elected.	▌ ✓ Toby Roth (Republican) 63.7%; ▌Stan Gruszynski (Democratic) 36.3%
Wisconsin 9	Jim Sensenbrenner	Republican	1978	Incumbent re-elected.	▌ ✓ Jim Sensenbrenner (Republican); Uncontested

== Wyoming ==
District	Incumbent			This race	
District	Representative	Party	First elected	Results	Candidates
Wyoming at-large	Craig L. Thomas	Republican	1989 (Special)	Incumbent retired to run for U.S. Senator. Republican hold.	▌ ✓ Barbara Cubin (Republican) 53.2%; ▌Bob Schuster (Democratic) 41.3%; ▌Dave Dawson (Libertarian) 5.5%

== Non-voting delegates ==
District	Incumbent			This race	
District	Delegate	Party	First elected	Results	Candidates
District of Columbia at-large	Eleanor Holmes Norton	Democratic	1990	Incumbent re-elected.	▌ ✓ Eleanor Holmes Norton (Democratic); [data missing]
U.S. Virgin Islands at-large	Ron de Lugo	Democratic	1980	Incumbent retired. New member elected. Independent gain.	▌ ✓ Victor O. Frazer (Independent); ▌Eileen Peterson (Democratic)
Guam at-large	Robert A. Underwood	Democratic	1992	Incumbent re-elected.	▌ ✓ Robert A. Underwood (Democratic); [data missing]

== See also ==
- 1994 United States elections
  - 1994 United States gubernatorial elections
  - 1994 United States Senate elections
- 103rd United States Congress

== Works cited ==
- Abramson, Paul; Aldrich, John; Rohde, David (1995). Change and Continuity in the 1992 Elections. CQ Press. ISBN 0871878399.
- Klinkner, Philip A. (1996). Midterm: The Elections of 1994 in Context. Westview Press.
