= Barrie Leslie Konicov =

United States hypnotist, author, and political candidate

Barrie Leslie Konicov (born c. 1939, died 2018, aged 79) was a United States hypnotist, author, and one-time Libertarian candidate for the United States Congress. He was the President and chief hypnotherapist of Potentials Unlimited. At one time Konicov sold approximately a million self-hypnosis tapes a year. Konicov was also notable for his involvement in several court cases including United States v Konicov, a 2001 conviction for one count of conspiracy to defraud the United States by impeding, impairing, obstructing, and defeating the lawful governmental functions of the Internal Revenue Service. He was also convicted on three counts of willfully failing to file Federal income tax returns for the years 1994, 1995, and 1996. Konicov received an 87-month prison sentence. The Atlantic magazine named Konicov fourth on its list of the ten biggest tax scofflaws of the 20th century.

== Potentials Unlimited Self Hypnosis ==
In 1977, with few credentials but a degree in marketing and three weekend courses in hypnosis at Ethical Hypnosis Training Center in South Orange, New Jersey, Konicov established Potentials Unlimited. Konicov stated that he began his hypnosis career by conducting group "Weight Loss" and "Stop Smoking" classes in Grand Rapids, Michigan, and recording a tape for each class.

Barrie Konicov's self-help self-hypnosis recordings are distinguished by his soothing voice and what Konicov referred to as his trademark—the words "Hello, Greetings, and Welcome" which begin each recording. Konicov since created over 200 programs. Konicov stated he began training other hypnotherapists in 1981. It was during this time that Potentials Unlimited was raided by the Food and Drug Administration because of the claims of the effectiveness of its products. This forced Potentials Unlimited to temper these claims. Konicov's daughter Stephanie became the marketing director, eventually selling recordings as diverse as self-help for thumbsucking and housekeeping in the business section of The New York Times. The Los Angeles Times described Konicov as a millionaire in 1988; by 1990, Konicov's recordings were selling at a million units a year through vendors like Barnes & Noble. While praised by consumers of his self-hypnosis recordings, the National Council Against Health Fraud compared Konicov's subliminal recordings' underlying philosophy to Scientology as having a similar notion: that negative experiences from past lives are transferred to become the basis for hang-ups in this life.

== From Libertarian to scofflaw ==
Running as a Libertarian, Konicov made a 1994 bid for the Michigan district 3 seat in the U.S. House of Representatives. Incumbent Republican Vernon Ehlers won in a landslide; Konicov placed third, receiving less than 2% of the vote.

Konicov continued as a tax protester. He did not file taxes for 1994, 1995, or 1996. He founded the De-Taxing America seminars and self-published his book The Great Snow Job arguing that federal income tax revenue is illegitimately sent to the Federal Reserve rather than to the Department of Treasury. The government lost $3.3 million of expected tax revenue from 138 of his De-Taxing America customers.

The Internal Revenue Service pursued charges against Konicov, and on June 22, 2001, Konicov was convicted on one count of conspiracy to defraud the United States and three counts of willfully failing to file Federal income tax returns. The trial was prosecuted by the same U.S. Attorney who oversaw the 1981 FDA raid of Potentials Unlimited, Phillip J. Green, who stated in a press release:

"At this time, when citizens are uniting, all taxpayers need to pay their fair share. It is these collected taxes that fund the Federal agencies that are currently called upon to serve the safety and security needs of each and everyone. This verdict and sentence should send a strong message to those people who are engaged in similar activities and I urge them to comply with the Federal tax laws."

On October 15, 2001, Konicov was sentenced to 87 months in a federal penitentiary followed by three years probation. In addition, the judge ordered Konicov to pay his own back taxes which totaled $11,311.81.

=== Legacy of The United States of America v Barrie Leslie Konicov ===
Because of the circumstances surrounding United States v Konicov, The Atlantic magazine listed Konicov among the top ten tax scofflaws of the 20th century. A later appellate court noted in deciding a case related to the right to represent oneself that in US v Konicov, the trial court removed the defendant during trial when he "remained seated when asked to rise for the judge, ignored repeated instructions not to testify during his opening statement, and engaged in a pointless debate over the court’s jurisdiction." However, the court also noted that US v Konicov cannot be used as precedent because, as late as 2008, the case remained unpublished.
