= 1992 United States House of Representatives elections in Virginia =

- November 3, 1992

All 11 Virginia seats to the United States House of Representatives
	Majority party	Minority party
Party	Democratic	Republican
Last election	6	4
Seats won	7	4
Seat change	▲1	Steady
Popular vote	1,148,570	1,142,649
Percentage	48.50%	48.25%
Swing	▼8.99%	▲12.61%

Democratic
40–50%
50–60%
60–70%
70–80%
80–90%
Republican
40–50%
50–60%
60–70%
70–80%
80–90%

The 1992 United States House of Representatives elections in Virginia were held on November 3, 1992, to determine who will represent the Commonwealth of Virginia in the United States House of Representatives. Virginia has eleven seats in the House, apportioned according to the 1990 United States census. Representatives are elected for two-year terms.

== Overview ==
United States House of Representatives elections in Virginia, 1992
Party	Votes	Percentage	Seats	+/–
Democratic	1,148,570	48.50%	7	+1
Republican	1,142,649	48.25%	4	-
Independents/Write-ins	76,828	3.24%	0	-
Totals	2,368,047	100.00%	11	+1

== See also ==
- 1992 United States House of Representatives elections
