= 1990 United States House of Representatives elections in Virginia =

1990 House elections in Virginia

- November 6, 1990

All 10 Virginia seats to the United States House of Representatives
	Majority party	Minority party	Third party
Party	Democratic	Republican	Independent
Last election	6	4	0
Seats won	6	4	0
Seat change	▲1	▼1	Steady
Popular vote	662,800	410,941	79,133
Percentage	57.49%	35.64%	6.86%
Swing	▲15.08%	▼21.31%	▲6.22%

The 1990 United States House of Representatives elections in Virginia were held on November 6, 1990 to determine who will represent the Commonwealth of Virginia in the United States House of Representatives. Virginia had ten seats in the House, apportioned according to the 1980 United States Census. Representatives are elected for two-year terms.

== Overview ==
United States House of Representatives elections in Virginia, 1990
Party	Votes	Percentage	Seats	+/–
Democratic	662,800	57.49%	6	+1
Republican	410,941	35.64%	4	-1
Independents/Write-ins	79,133	6.86%	0	-
Totals	1,152,874	100.00%	10	-

== See also ==
- United States House elections, 1990
