= 2008 United States House of Representatives elections in Tennessee =

- November 4, 2008

All 9 Tennessee seats to the United States House of Representatives
- Turnout: 66.34% ▲16.37 pp
	Majority party	Minority party
Party	Democratic	Republican
Last election	5	4
Seats won	5	4
Seat change	Steady	Steady
Popular vote	1,195,542	977,677
Percentage	51.94%	42.47%
Swing	▲1.76%	▼4.14%

Democratic hold
Republican hold
Democratic
50–60%
60–70%
70–80%
80–90%
>90%
Republican
50–60%
60–70%
70–80%
80–90%

The 2008 congressional elections in Tennessee was held on November 4, 2008, to elect the 9 U.S. representatives from the state of Tennessee, one from each of the state's nine congressional districts.

Following the 2008 elections, no seats changed hands, leaving the Tennessee delegation at a 5-4 Democratic majority. As of 2026, this was the last time Democrats won a majority of congressional districts from Tennessee's House delegation, as well as the House popular vote, until 2026 were only Democrat won the 4th congressional district.

== Overview ==
United States House of Representatives elections in Tennessee, 2008
Party	Votes	Percentage	Seats	+/–
Democratic	1,195,542	51.94%	5	—
Republican	977,677	42.47%	4	—
Independents	128,601	5.59%	0	—
Write-in	65	0.00%	0	—
Totals	2,301,885	100.00%	9	—

Popular vote
Democratic	51.94%
Republican	42.47%
Other	5.59%

House seats
Democratic	55.56%
Republican	44.44%

=== By district ===
District	Incumbent	Party	First elected	Results	Candidates
Tennessee 1	David Davis	Republican	2006	Incumbent lost renomination. New member elected. Republican hold.	▌ ✓ Phil Roe (Republican) 71.8%; ▌Rob Russell (Democratic) 24.5%; ▌Joel Goodman (Independent) 1.7%; ▌James Reeves (Independent) 1.1%; ▌Thomas Owens (Independent) 0.8%
Tennessee 2	Jimmy Duncan	Republican	1998	Incumbent re-elected.	▌ ✓ Jimmy Duncan (Republican) 78.1%; ▌Bob Scott (Democratic) 21.9%
Tennessee 3	Zach Wamp	Republican	1994	Incumbent re-elected.	▌ ✓ Zach Wamp (Republican) 69.4%; ▌Doug Vandagriff (Democratic) 27.4%; ▌Jean Howard-Hill (Independent) 1.8%; ▌Ed Choate (Independent) 1.4%
Tennessee 4	Lincoln Davis	Democratic	2002	Incumbent re-elected.	▌ ✓ Lincoln Davis (Democratic) 58.8%; ▌Monty Lankford (Republican) 37.8%; ▌James Anthony Gray (Independent) 1.9%; ▌Kevin Ragsdale (Independent) 1.5%
Tennessee 5	Jim Cooper	Democratic	1982; 1994 (retired); 2002	Incumbent re-elected.	▌ ✓ Jim Cooper (Democratic) 65.9%; ▌Gerard Donovan (Republican) 31.0%; ▌Jon Jackson (Independent) 2.0%; ▌John Miglietta (Green) 1.2%
Tennessee 6	Bart Gordon	Democratic	1984	Incumbent re-elected.	▌ ✓ Bart Gordon (Democratic) 74.4%; ▌Chris Baker (Independent) 25.6%
Tennessee 7	Marsha Blackburn	Republican	2002	Incumbent re-elected.	▌ ✓ Marsha Blackburn (Republican) 68.6%; ▌Randy Morris (Democratic) 31.4%
Tennessee 8	John Tanner	Democratic	1988	Incumbent re-elected.	▌ ✓ John Tanner (Democratic) Uncontested
Tennessee 9	Steve Cohen	Democratic	2006	Incumbent re-elected.	▌ ✓ Steve Cohen (Democratic) 87.9%; ▌Jake Ford (Independent) 4.9%; ▌Dewey Clark (Independent) 4.4%; ▌Mary Wright (Independent) 2.8%

== District 1 ==
2008 Tennessee's 1st congressional district election
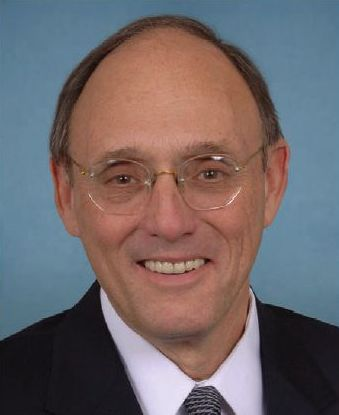

Nominee	Phil Roe	Rob Russell
Party	Republican	Democratic
Popular vote	168,343	57,525
Percentage	71.82%	24.54%
- County results Roe: 70–80% 80–90%
U.S. Representative before election
David Davis
Republican
Elected U.S. Representative
Phil Roe
Republican

This district covers northeast Tennessee, including all of Carter, Cocke, Greene, Hamblen, Hancock, Hawkins, Johnson, Sullivan, Unicoi, and Washington counties and parts of Jefferson County and Sevier County. It had been represented by Republican David Davis since 2007. Johnson City mayor Roe narrowly defeated Davis in the Republican primary by a margin of 50% to 49% (only 500 votes). Davis was elected in 2006, succeeding retiring congressman Bill Jenkins, winning the Republican nomination over a crowded field which included Roe. Roe, a retired OB/GYN, was endorsed by several local newspapers, refused PAC and special interest money, and promised not to serve any more than ten years in Congress. He was a shoo-in for election in a district that has only elected Republicans since 1880.

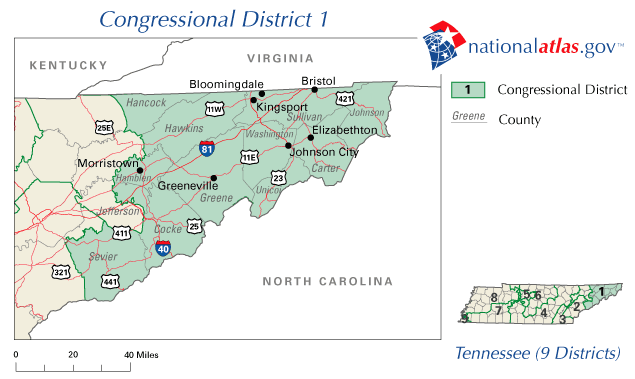

=== Democratic primary ===
- Michael Donihe
- Rob Russell

Democratic primary results
Party	Candidate	Votes	%
Democratic	Michael Donihe	1,968	32.3
Democratic	Rob Russell	4,123	67.7
Total votes		6,091	100.0

=== Republican primary ===
Johnson City Mayor Phil Roe challenged incumbent David Davis. During the campaign, Roe attacked Davis as an ineffective politician who had sold out to special interests and accepted contributions from oil companies during a summer of record gasoline prices.

Roe defeated incumbent congressman David Davis in the primary election by 482 votes.

It was the first time since 1966 that an incumbent Tennessee congressman had lost a primary. It was also the first time since 1950 that an incumbent congressman lost a primary in the 1st District. Davis claimed Democratic voters, knowing they had no realistic chance of defeating him in November, contributed to his primary loss by crossing over to vote for Roe in the Republican primary. He believed he was the winner among voters who identify as Republicans.

==== Candidates ====
- David Davis, incumbent
- Phil Roe, mayor of Johnson City
- Mahmood "Michael" Sabri

==== Results ====
2008 Republican primary results Roe: 50–60%; Davis: 50–60%; 60–70%

Republican primary results
Party	Candidate	Votes	%
Republican	Phil Roe	25,993	50.15%
Republican	David Davis (incumbent)	25,511	49.22%
Republican	Mahmood "Michael" Sabri	329	0.63%
Total votes		51,833	100.00%

=== Predictions ===
Source	Ranking	As of
The Cook Political Report	Safe R	November 6, 2008
Rothenberg	Safe R	November 2, 2008
Sabato's Crystal Ball	Safe R	November 6, 2008
Real Clear Politics	Safe R	November 7, 2008
CQ Politics	Safe R	November 6, 2008

Tennessee's 1st congressional district election, 2008
Party	Candidate	Votes	%
Republican	Phil Roe	168,343	71.82
Democratic	Rob Russell	57,525	24.54
Independent	Joel Goodman	3,988	1.70
Independent	James W. Reeves	2,544	1.09
Independent	T. K. Owens	1,981	0.85
Total votes		234,381	100.00
Republican hold			

== District 2 ==
2008 Tennessee's 2nd congressional district election
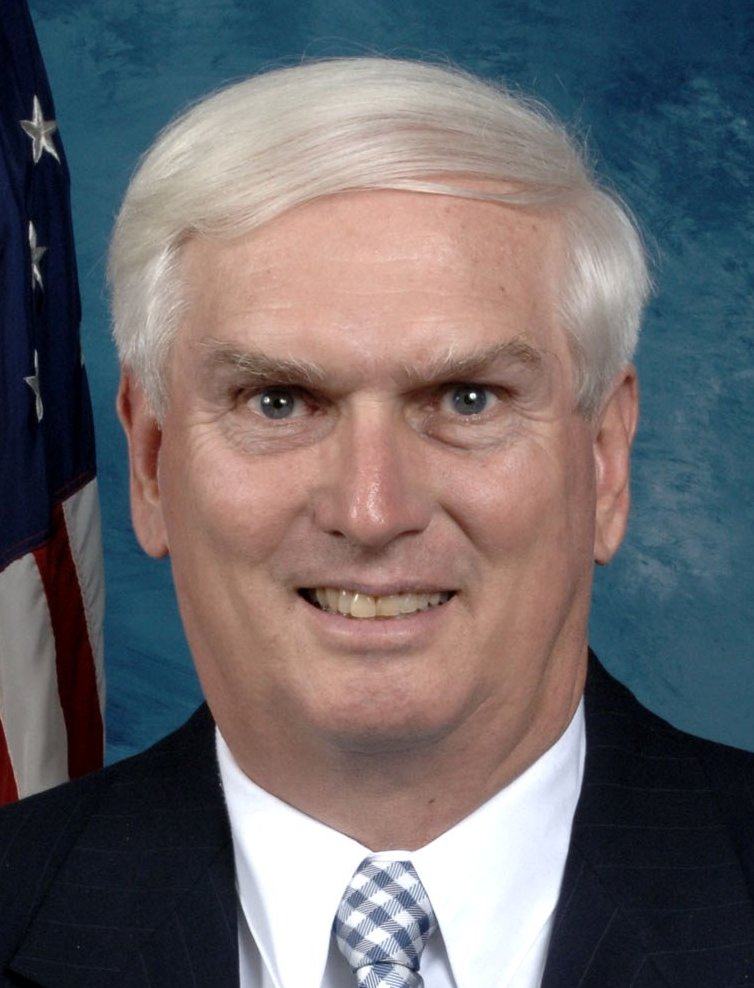

Nominee	Jimmy Duncan	Bob Scott
Party	Republican	Democratic
Popular vote	227,120	63,639
Percentage	78.11%	21.89%
- County results Duncan: 70–80% 80–90%
U.S. Representative before election
Jimmy Duncan
Republican
Elected U.S. Representative
Jimmy Duncan
Republican

This district lies in the east-central part of the state, based in Knoxville, and is largely coextensive with that city's metropolitan area. It has been represented by Republican Jimmy Duncan since November 1988. He ran against Democrat Bob Scott. No Democrat has held this seat since 1855.

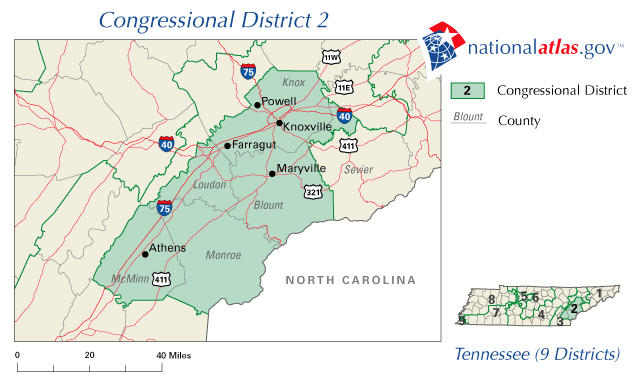

=== Democratic primary ===
- David Ryan Hancock
- Bob Scott

Democratic primary results
Party	Candidate	Votes	%
Democratic	David Ryan Hancock	6,765	40.3
Democratic	Bob Scott	10,006	59.7
Total votes		16,771	100.0

=== Republican primary ===
- John J. Duncan Jr.

Republican primary results
Party	Candidate	Votes	%
Republican	John J. Duncan Jr.	50,722	100.0
Total votes		50,722	100.0

=== Predictions ===
Source	Ranking	As of
The Cook Political Report	Safe R	November 6, 2008
Rothenberg	Safe R	November 2, 2008
Sabato's Crystal Ball	Safe R	November 6, 2008
Real Clear Politics	Safe R	November 7, 2008
CQ Politics	Safe R	November 6, 2008

Tennessee's 2nd congressional district election, 2008
Party	Candidate	Votes	%
Republican	Jimmy Duncan (inc.)	227,120	78.11
Democratic	Bob Scott	63,639	21.89
Total votes		290,759	100.00
Republican hold			

== District 3 ==
2008 Tennessee's 3rd congressional district election
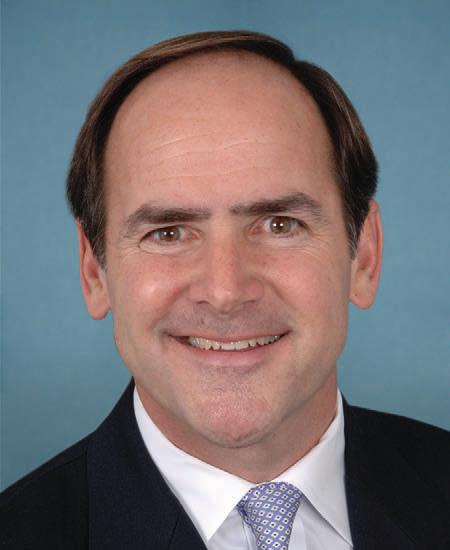

Nominee	Zach Wamp	Doug Vandagriff
Party	Republican	Democratic
Popular vote	184,964	73,059
Percentage	69.37%	27.40%
- County results Wamp: 60–70% 70–80%
U.S. Representative before election
Zach Wamp
Republican
Elected U.S. Representative
Zach Wamp
Republican

Tennessee’s 3rd congressional district, which stretches from the Chattanooga metropolitan area in southern Tennessee to Claiborne County in northern Tennessee, is strongly conservative and has been represented by Republican Congressman Zach Wamp since his initial 1994 election.

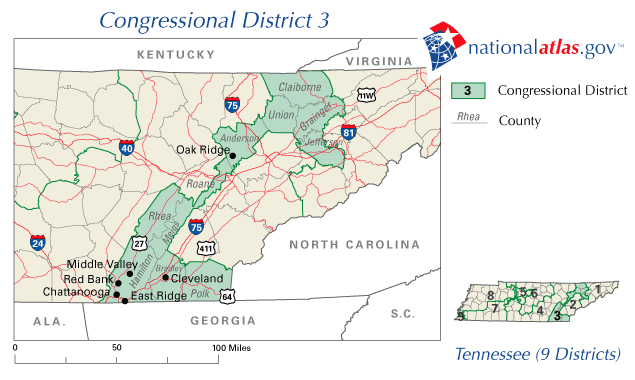

=== Democratic primary ===
- Doug Vandagriff

Democratic primary results
Party	Candidate	Votes	%
Democratic	Doug Vandagriff	13,122	100.00%
Total votes		13,122	100.00%

=== Republican primary ===
- Teresa Sheppard
- Zach Wamp

Republican primary results
Party	Candidate	Votes	%
Republican	Teresa Sheppard	3,125	8.95%
Republican	Zach Wamp	31,782	91.05%
Total votes		34,907	100.00%

=== Predictions ===
Source	Ranking	As of
The Cook Political Report	Safe R	November 6, 2008
Rothenberg	Safe R	November 2, 2008
Sabato's Crystal Ball	Safe R	November 6, 2008
Real Clear Politics	Safe R	November 7, 2008
CQ Politics	Safe R	November 6, 2008

Tennessee's 3rd congressional district election, 2008
Party	Candidate	Votes	%
Republican	Zach Wamp (inc.)	184,964	69.37
Democratic	Doug Vandagriff	73,059	27.40
Independent	Jean Howard-Hill	4,848	1.82
Independent	Ed Choate	3,750	1.41
Write-ins		7	0.00
Total votes		266,628	100.00
Republican hold			

== District 4 ==
2008 Tennessee's 4th congressional district election
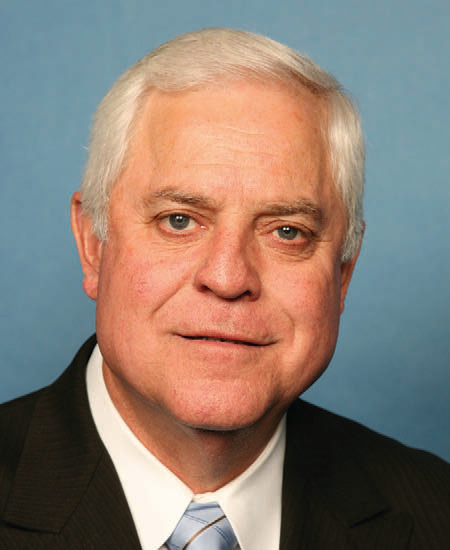

Nominee	Lincoln Davis	Monty J. Lankford
Party	Democratic	Republican
Popular vote	146,776	94,447
Percentage	58.76%	37.81%
- County results Davis: 50–60% 60–70% 70–80% Lankford: 50–60%
U.S. Representative before election
Lincoln Davis
Democratic
Elected U.S. Representative
Lincoln Davis
Democratic

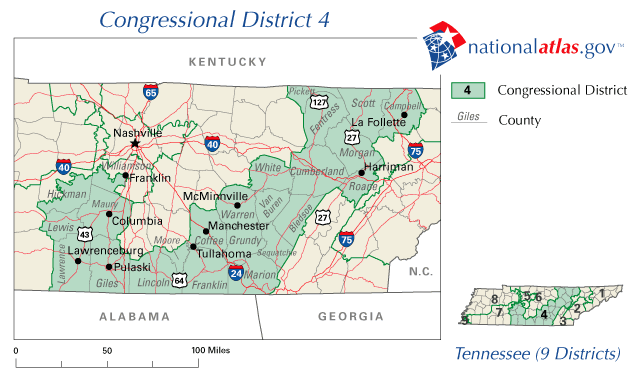

This district lies in Middle and East Tennessee and includes all of Bledsoe, Campbell, Coffee, Cumberland, Fentress, Franklin, Giles, Grundy, Lawrence, Lewis, Lincoln, Marion, Maury, Moore, Morgan, Pickett, Scott, Sequatchie, Van Buren, Warren, and White Counties, as well as portions of Hickman, Roane, and Williamson counties. It has been represented by Democrat Lincoln Davis since 2003. He ran against Republican Monty Lankford. Although the 4th is one of the few districts in the nation that is not considered safe for either party, its size and the fact it includes five television markets make it fairly easy for incumbents to tenure themselves in.

=== Democratic primary ===
- Lincoln Davis
- Bert Mason

Democratic primary results
Party	Candidate	Votes	%
Democratic	Lincoln Davis	30,487	90.4
Democratic	Bert Mason	3,233	9.6
Total votes		33,720	100.0

=== Republican primary ===
- Kent Greenough
- Monty J. Lankford
- Don Strong

Republican primary results
Party	Candidate	Votes	%
Republican	Kent Greenough	3,749	17.6
Republican	Monty J. Lankford	13,363	62.7
Republican	Don Strong	4,199	19.7
Total votes		21,311	100.0

=== Predictions ===
Source	Ranking	As of
The Cook Political Report	Safe D	November 6, 2008
Rothenberg	Safe D	November 2, 2008
Sabato's Crystal Ball	Safe D	November 6, 2008
Real Clear Politics	Safe D	November 7, 2008
CQ Politics	Safe D	November 6, 2008

Tennessee's 4th congressional district election, 2008
Party	Candidate	Votes	%
Democratic	Lincoln Davis (inc.)	146,776	58.76
Republican	Monty J. Lankford	94,447	37.81
Independent	James Anthony Gray	4,869	1.95
Independent	Kevin Ragsdale	3,713	1.49
Total votes		249,805	100.00
Democratic hold			

== District 5 ==
2008 Tennessee's 5th congressional district election
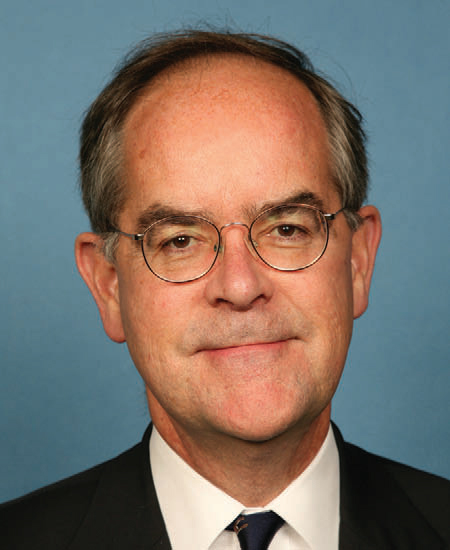

Nominee	Jim Cooper	Gerard Donovan
Party	Democratic	Republican
Popular vote	181,467	85,471
Percentage	65.84%	31.01%
- County results Cooper: 50–60% 60–70% Donovan: 50–60%
U.S. Representative before election
Jim Cooper
Democratic
Elected U.S. Representative
Jim Cooper
Democratic

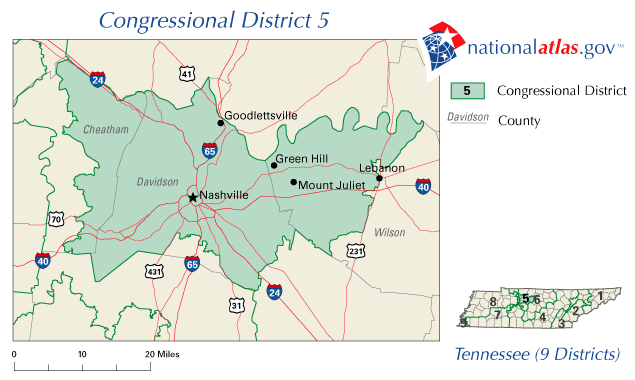

Tennessee’s 5th congressional district was centered on Nashville and included portions of the surrounding area. The district was anchored by the majority of Nashville–Davidson County, making Nashville its largest city and primary population center. In addition to Nashville, the district extended into parts of Cheatham County and Wilson County. This included communities such as Ashland City, Pleasant View, and Pegram in Cheatham County, as well as most of Lebanon, as well as Mount Juliet, and Green Hill in Wilson County. It had been represented by Democrat Jim Cooper since 2003. He ran against Republican Gerard Donovan.

=== Democratic primary ===
- Jim Cooper

Democratic primary results
Party	Candidate	Votes	%
Democratic	Jim Cooper	17,985	100.0
Total votes		17,985	100.0

=== Republican primary ===
- Gerard Donovan
- Vijay A. Kumar

Republican primary results
Party	Candidate	Votes	%
Republican	Gerard Donovan	5,482	71.1
Republican	Vijay A. Kumar	2,225	28.9
Total votes		7,707	100.0

=== Predictions ===
Source	Ranking	As of
The Cook Political Report	Safe D	November 6, 2008
Rothenberg	Safe D	November 2, 2008
Sabato's Crystal Ball	Safe D	November 6, 2008
Real Clear Politics	Safe D	November 7, 2008
CQ Politics	Safe D	November 6, 2008

Tennessee's 5th congressional district election, 2008
Party	Candidate	Votes	%
Democratic	Jim Cooper (inc.)	181,467	65.84
Republican	Gerard Donovan	85,471	31.01
Independent	Jon Jackson	5,464	1.98
Independent	John P. Miglietta	3,196	1.16
Write-ins		4	0.00
Total votes		275,602	100.00
Democratic hold			

== District 6 ==
2008 Tennessee's 6th congressional district election
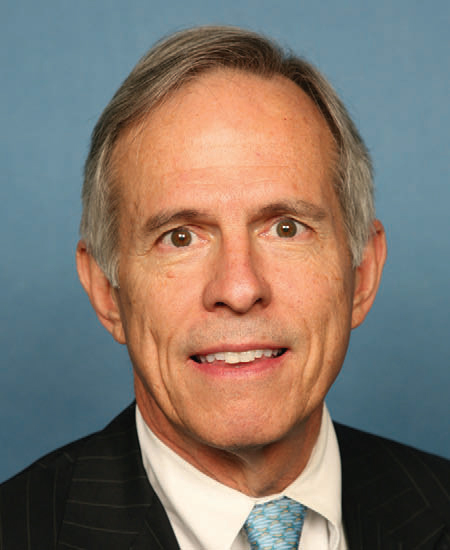

Nominee	Bart Gordon	Chris Baker
Party	Democratic	Independent
Popular vote	194,264	66,764
Percentage	74.42%	25.58%
- County results Gordon: 60–70% 70–80% 80–90% >90%
U.S. Representative before election
Bart Gordon
Democratic
Elected U.S. Representative
Bart Gordon
Democratic

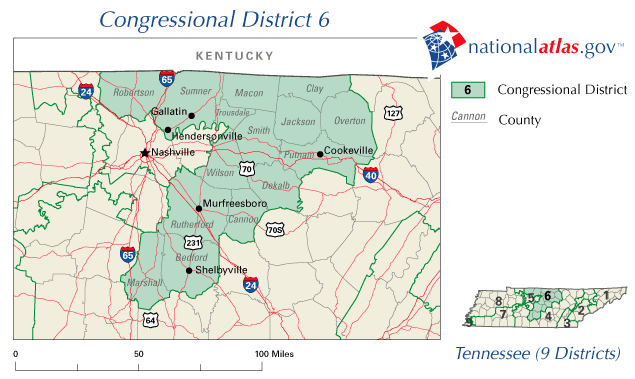

This district lies in Middle Tennessee, including all of Bedford, Cannon, Clay, DeKalb, Jackson, Macon, Marshall, Overton, Putnam, Robertson, Rutherford, Smith, Sumner, and Trousdale Counties, as well as a portion of Wilson County. It has been represented by Democrat Bart Gordon since 1985. He ran against independent candidate Chris Baker.

=== Democratic primary ===
- Bart Gordon

Democratic primary results
Party	Candidate	Votes	%
Democratic	Bart Gordon	21,752	100.0
Total votes		21,752	100.0

=== Republican primary ===
Steven L. Edmondson appeared as a write-in candidate in the 2008 Republican primary but did not receive any votes in the general election.

- Steven L. Edmondson (write-in)

Republican primary results
Party	Candidate	Votes	%
Republican	Steven L. Edmondson (write-in)	723	100.0
Total votes		723	100.0

=== Predictions ===
Source	Ranking	As of
The Cook Political Report	Safe D	November 6, 2008
Rothenberg	Safe D	November 2, 2008
Sabato's Crystal Ball	Safe D	November 6, 2008
Real Clear Politics	Safe D	November 7, 2008
CQ Politics	Safe D	November 6, 2008

Tennessee's 6th congressional district election, 2008
Party	Candidate	Votes	%
Democratic	Bart Gordon (inc.)	194,264	74.42
Independent	Chris Baker	66,764	25.58
Total votes		261,028	100.00
Democratic hold			

== District 7 ==
2008 Tennessee's 7th congressional district election
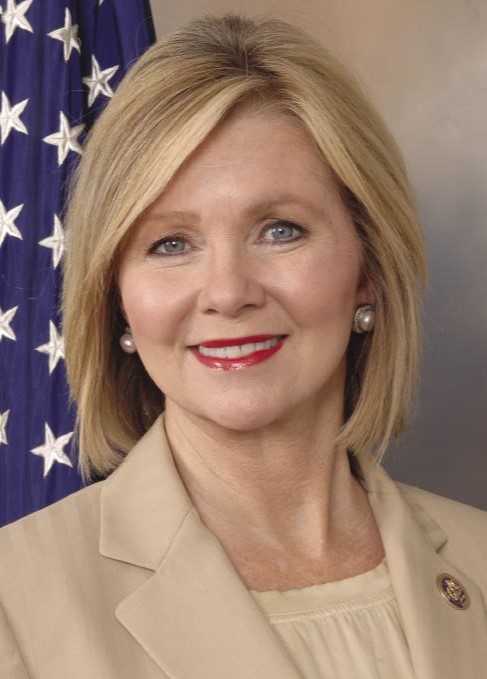

Nominee	Marsha Blackburn	Randy G. Morris
Party	Republican	Democratic
Popular vote	217,332	99,549
Percentage	68.58%	31.42%
- County results Blackburn: 50–60% 60–70% 70–80% Morris: 50–60%
U.S. Representative before election
Marsha Blackburn
Republican
Elected U.S. Representative
Marsha Blackburn
Republican

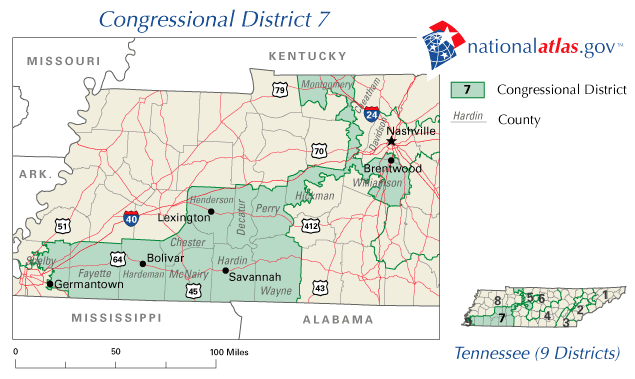

Tennessee’s 7th congressional district stretched from portions of Shelby County in West Tennessee through parts of Middle Tennessee which included the majority of Williamson County and a part of southern suburban Nashville and northward to include Clarksville in Montgomery County, resulting in an unusually long and narrow configuration that combined distant suburban and rural areas into a single congressional district. The district had been represented by Republican Marsha Blackburn since 2003. She ran against Democrat Randy G. Morris.

=== Democratic primary ===
- Randy G. Morris
- James Tomasik

Democratic primary results
Party	Candidate	Votes	%
Democratic	Randy G. Morris	12,003	77.2
Democratic	James Tomasik	3,535	22.8
Total votes		15,538	100.0

=== Republican primary ===
Tom Leatherwood ran for the 7th Congressional District against sitting Republican Congressman Marsha Blackburn. The race became heated when Leatherwood sent a letter to supporters accusing Blackburn of illegally using campaign money and, "talking the talk" but not "walking the walk."

A Collierville, TN resident then made a FEC complaint against Leatherwood. The complaint alleged that, "Leatherwood’s advertisements didn’t have him approving the message in his own voice, didn’t disclose who paid for his yard signs, and didn’t show his campaign’s website as an expense on his campaign disclosure reports."

Blackburn won the primary with 62% of the vote.

==== Candidates ====
- Marsha Blackburn, Incumbent
- Tom Leatherwood, Shelby County Register of Deeds and former state senator

Republican primary results
Party	Candidate	Votes	%
Republican	Marsha Blackburn (incumbent)	30,997	62.0%
Republican	Tom Leatherwood	19,025	38.0%
Total votes		50,022	100.0%

=== Predictions ===
Source	Ranking	As of
The Cook Political Report	Safe R	November 6, 2008
Rothenberg	Safe R	November 2, 2008
Sabato's Crystal Ball	Safe R	November 6, 2008
Real Clear Politics	Safe R	November 7, 2008
CQ Politics	Safe R	November 6, 2008

Tennessee's 7th congressional district election, 2008
Party	Candidate	Votes	%
Republican	Marsha Blackburn (inc.)	217,332	68.58
Democratic	Randy G. Morris	99,549	31.42
Total votes		316,881	100.00
Republican hold			

== District 8 ==
2008 Tennessee's 8th congressional district election
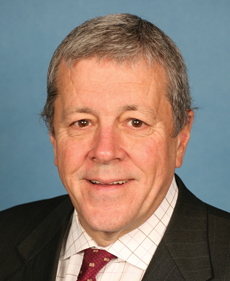
Nominee	John Tanner
Party	Democratic
Popular vote	180,465
Percentage	99.97%
- County results Tanner: >90%
U.S. Representative before election
John Tanner
Democratic
Elected U.S. Representative
John Tanner
Democratic

This district covers roughly the northwestern part of the state. It has been represented by Democrat John Tanner since 1989. He ran unopposed and encountered opposition from only a few write-in votes.

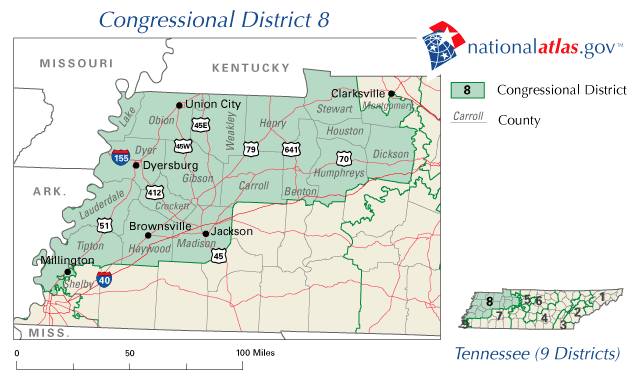

=== Democratic primary ===
- John Tanner

Democratic primary results
Party	Candidate	Votes	%
Democratic	John Tanner	24,844	100.0
Total votes		24,844	100.0

=== Republican primary ===
James Hart appeared as a write-in candidate in the 2008 Republican primary but did not receive any votes in the general election.

James L. Hart, who had previously attempted to run in 2006 and ran in 2004, attempted to run again. Republican state leadership successfully petitioned to have him removed from the ballot on the grounds that he was not a bona fide member of the party. Hart's attorney when he first challenged to remain on the ballot in 2006 was Richard Barrett, the Mississippi white nationalist leader. Heart ended up having a write-In campaign where he only received 4 votes.

- James Hart (write-in), a white supremacist, segregationist activist in Buchanan, Tennessee

Republican primary results
Party	Candidate	Votes	%
Republican	James Hart (write-in)	23	100.0
Total votes		23	100.0

=== Predictions ===
Source	Ranking	As of
The Cook Political Report	Safe D	November 6, 2008
Rothenberg	Safe D	November 2, 2008
Sabato's Crystal Ball	Safe D	November 6, 2008
Real Clear Politics	Safe D	November 7, 2008
CQ Politics	Safe D	November 6, 2008

Tennessee's 8th congressional district election, 2008
Party	Candidate	Votes	%
Democratic	John S. Tanner (inc.)	180,465	99.97
Write-ins		54	0.03
Total votes		180,519	100.00
Democratic hold			

== District 9 ==
2008 Tennessee's 9th congressional district election
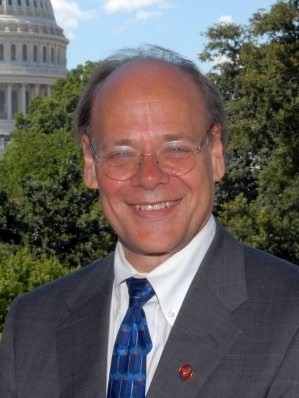
Nominee	Steve Cohen
Party	Democratic
Popular vote	198,798
Percentage	87.85%
- County results Cohen: 80–90%
U.S. Representative before election
Steve Cohen
Democratic
Elected U.S. Representative
Steve Cohen
Democratic

This district lies in southwestern Tennessee, located entirely within Shelby County and including most of the city of Memphis. It had been represented by Democrat Steve Cohen since 2007, who ran against independent candidates Jake Ford, Dewey Clark, and Taylor Shelby Wright. Cohen defeated attorney Nikki Tinker by a 79% to 19% margin in the Democratic primary.

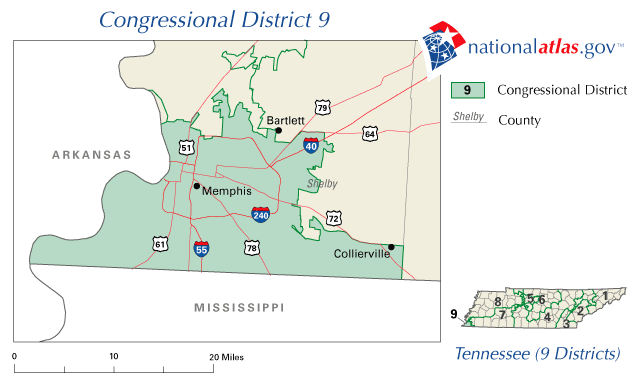

=== Democratic primary ===
Cohen, who is the only white congressman representing a majority black district, defeated Tinker, who is black, by a much narrower margin in 2006. There was much controversy over accusations made by the Tinker campaign that Cohen was involved with the Ku Klux Klan, and circulation of anti-Semitic propaganda against Cohen, who is Jewish. No Republican filed in this overwhelmingly Democratic district, although Cohen's primary victory assured him of a second term in any case.

==== Candidates ====
- Steve Cohen
- James Gregory
- Isaac Richmond
- Nikki Tinker
- Joe Towns Jr.

Democratic primary results
Party	Candidate	Votes	%
Democratic	Steve Cohen (incumbent)	50,306	79.36%
Democratic	Nikki Tinker	11,817	18.64%
Democratic	Joe Towns Jr.	914	1.44%
Democratic	James Gregory	180	0.28%
Democratic	Isaac Richmond	172	0.27%
Total votes		63,389	100.00%

=== Republican primary ===
No candidate ran for the Republican nomination.

=== Predictions ===
Source	Ranking	As of
The Cook Political Report	Safe D	November 6, 2008
Rothenberg	Safe D	November 2, 2008
Sabato's Crystal Ball	Safe D	November 6, 2008
Real Clear Politics	Safe D	November 7, 2008
CQ Politics	Safe D	November 6, 2008

Tennessee's 9th congressional district election, 2008
Party	Candidate	Votes	%
Democratic	Steve Cohen (inc.)	198,798	87.85
Independent	Jake Ford	11,003	4.86
Independent	Dewey Clark	10,047	4.44
Independent	Taylor Shelby Wright	6,434	2.84
Total votes		226,282	100.00
Democratic hold			

== See also ==
- 2008 Tennessee elections
- 2008 United States elections

Preceded by 2006 elections	United States House of Representatives elections in Tennessee; 2008	Succeeded by 2010 elections
