= 2002 United States House of Representatives elections in Tennessee =

- November 5, 2002

All 9 Tennessee seats to the United States House of Representatives
- Turnout: 50.40% ▼12.63 pp
	Majority party	Minority party
Party	Democratic	Republican
Last election	4	5
Seats won	5	4
Seat change	▲1	▼1
Popular vote	708,290	770,514
Percentage	46.31%	50.38%
Swing	▲2.14%	▼3.11%

Democratic hold Democratic gain
Republican hold
Democratic
40–50%
50–60%
60–70%
70–80%
80–90%
Republican
40–50%
50–60%
60–70%
70–80%
80–90%
90–100%

The 2002 congressional elections in Tennessee was held on November 5, 2002, to determine who will represent the state of Tennessee in the United States House of Representatives.

These elections were the first under Tennessee's new congressional map after redistricting was completed by the state government. Following the 2002 elections, while the Republican Party won a larger share of the statewide popular vote, Democratic nominee Lincoln Davis flipped the 4th congressional district, which was previously represented by Republican Van Hilleary. This flipped the Tennessee delegation to a 5–4 Democratic majority.

Tennessee was one of six states in which the party that won the state's popular vote did not win a majority of seats in 2002, the other states being Connecticut, Illinois, Michigan, New Mexico, and Texas.

== Redistricting ==
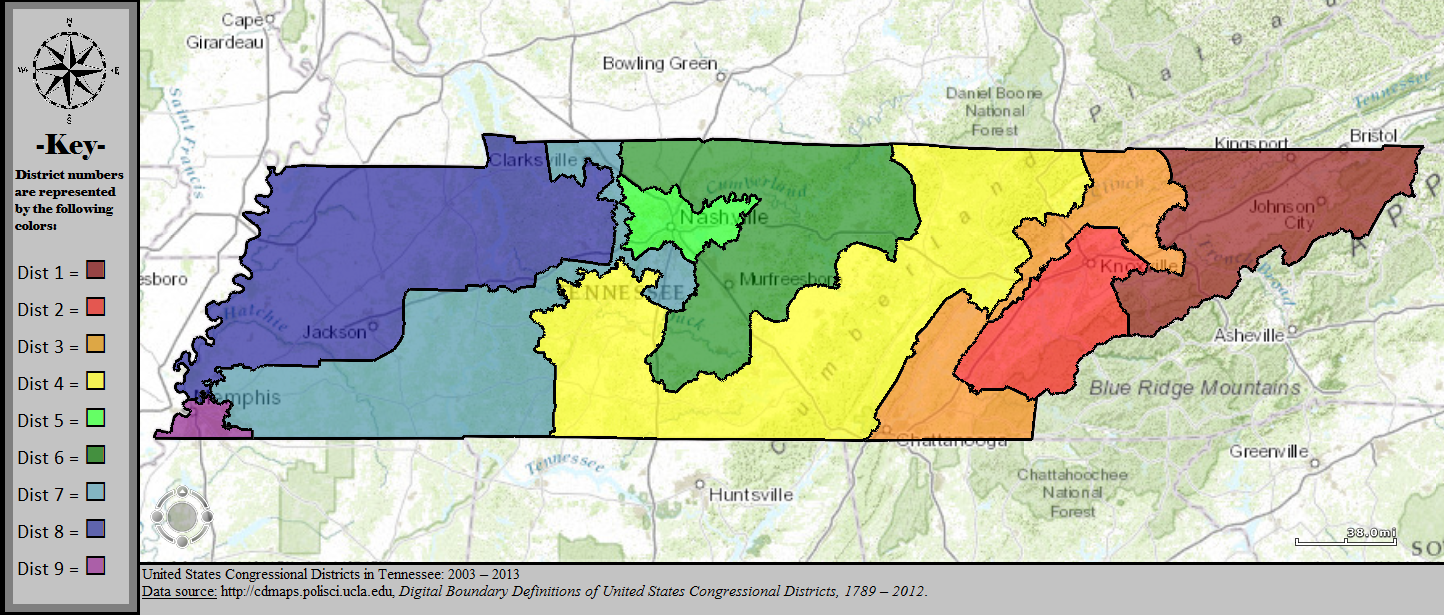
Tennessee's congressional districts, 2003-2013

Following the release of the 2000 United States census data, the Tennessee General Assembly adopted new congressional district boundaries in early 2002 to reflect population shifts and comply with federal equal-population requirements. At the time, the Tennessee Legislature was controlled by the Democratic Party, which held majorities in both chambers of the General Assembly, and the plan was signed into law by Republican Governor Don Sundquist. The redistricting bill for the U.S. House was passed by the legislature on January 10, 2002 and approved by the governor on January 17, 2002.

The 2002 redistricting plan revised several congressional district boundaries and was described by some as a Democratic gerrymander. Despite those claims, the map complied with federal redistricting requirements and was not overturned in court.

== Overview ==
United States House of Representatives elections in Tennessee, 2002
Party	Votes	Percentage	Seats	+/–
Democratic	708,290	46.31%	5	▲1
Republican	770,514	50.38%	4	▼1
Independents	48,450	3.17%	0	—
Write-in	2,055	0.13%	0	—
Totals	1,529,309	100.00%	9	—

Popular vote
Republican	50.38%
Democratic	46.31%
Other	3.30%

House seats
Democratic	55.56%
Republican	44.44%

=== By district ===
District	Incumbent			This race	
District	Member	Party	First elected	Results	Candidates
Tennessee 1	Bill Jenkins	Republican	1996	Incumbent re-elected.	▌ ✓ Bill Jenkins (Republican); Uncontested
Tennessee 2	Jimmy Duncan	Republican	1988	Incumbent re-elected.	▌ ✓ Jimmy Duncan (Republican) 78.98%; ▌John Greene (Democratic) 19.91%; Others: ▌Joshua Williamson (Independent) 0.60%; ▌George Njezic (Independent) 0.51%
Tennessee 3	Zach Wamp	Republican	1994	Incumbent re-elected.	▌ ✓ Zach Wamp (Republican) 64.54%; ▌John Wolfe Jr. (Democratic) 33.82%; ▌William Bolen (Independent) 1.00%; ▌Timothy Sevier (Independent) 0.54%
Tennessee 4	Van Hilleary	Republican	1994	Incumbent retired to run for Governor of Tennessee. New member elected. Democratic gain.	▌ ✓ Lincoln Davis (Democratic) 52.08%; ▌Janice Bowling (Republican) 46.49%; Others: ▌William Chandler (Independent) 0.58%; ▌John Ray (Independent) 0.33%; ▌Bert Mason (Independent) 0.27%; ▌Ed Wellmann (Independent) 0.22%
Tennessee 5	Bob Clement	Democratic	1988	Incumbent retired to run for U.S. senator. New member elected. Democratic hold.	▌ ✓ Jim Cooper (Democratic) 63.73%; ▌Robert Duvall (Republican) 33.25%; ▌John Jay Hooker (Independent) 1.79%; Others: ▌Jonathan Farley (Independent) 0.71%; ▌Jesse Turner (Independent) 0.51%
Tennessee 6	Bart Gordon	Democratic	1984	Incumbent re-elected.	▌ ✓ Bart Gordon (Democratic) 65.92%; ▌Robert Garrison (Republican) 32.33%; ▌Patrick Lyons (Independent) 1.73%
Tennessee 7	Ed Bryant	Republican	1994	Incumbent retired to run for U.S. senator. New member elected. Republican hold.	▌ ✓ Marsha Blackburn (Republican) 70.73%; ▌Tim Barron (Democratic) 26.48%; ▌Rick Patterson (Independent) 2.77%
Tennessee 8	John S. Tanner	Democratic	1988	Incumbent re-elected.	▌ ✓ John S. Tanner (Democratic) 70.14%; ▌Mat McClain (Republican) 27.30%; ▌James L. Hart (Independent) 2.55%
Tennessee 9	Harold Ford Jr.	Democratic	1996	Incumbent re-elected.	▌ ✓ Harold Ford Jr. (Democratic) 83.81%; ▌Tony Rush (Independent) 16.09%

== District 1 ==
2002 Tennessee's 1st congressional district election
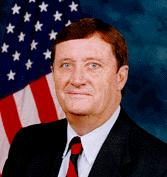
Nominee	Bill Jenkins
Party	Republican
Popular vote	127,300
Percentage	98.77%
- County results Jenkins: >90%
U.S. Representative before election
Bill Jenkins
Republican
Elected U.S. Representative
Bill Jenkins
Republican

Tennessee’s 1st congressional district covered northeast Tennessee, including all of Carter, Cocke, Greene, Hamblen, Hancock, Hawkins, Johnson, Sullivan, Unicoi, and Washington counties and parts of Jefferson County and Sevier County. It has been represented by Republican Bill Jenkins.

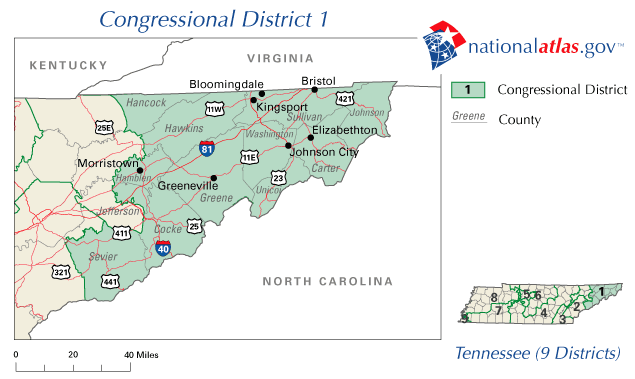

=== Democratic primary ===
- Write-Ins

Democratic primary results
Party	Candidate	Votes	%
Democratic	Write-Ins	494	100.00%
Total votes		494	100.00%

=== Republican primary ===
- Larry P. Edgell
- Bill Jenkins
- Write-Ins

Republican primary results
Party	Candidate	Votes	%
Republican	Larry P. Edgell	8,740	11.8%
Republican	Bill Jenkins	65,421	88.2%
Republican	Write-Ins	50	0.1%
Total votes		74,211	100.0%

=== Predictions ===
Source	Ranking	As of
Sabato's Crystal Ball	Safe R	November 4, 2002
New York Times	Safe R	October 14, 2002

=== Results ===
Tennessee's 1st congressional district election, 2002
Party	Candidate	Votes	%
Republican	Bill Jenkins (inc.)	127,300	98.77%
Write-In	Write-ins	1,586	1.23%
Total votes		128,886	100.00%
Republican hold			

== District 2 ==
2002 Tennessee's 2nd congressional district election
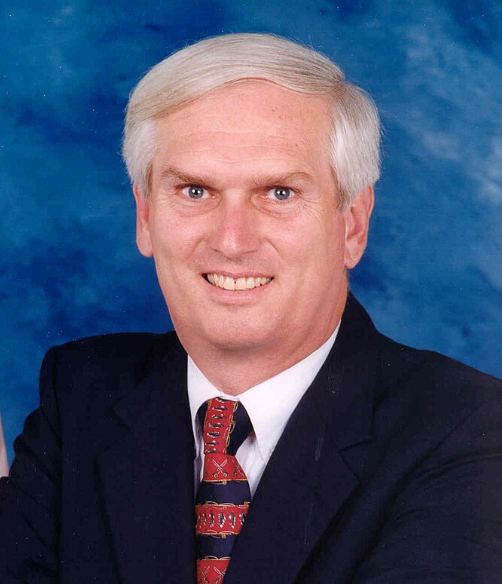

Nominee	Jimmy Duncan	John Greene
Party	Republican	Democratic
Popular vote	146,887	37,035
Percentage	78.98%	19.91%
- County results Duncan: 70–80% 80–90%
U.S. Representative before election
Jimmy Duncan
Republican
Elected U.S. Representative
Jimmy Duncan
Republican

Tennessee’s 2nd congressional district lies in the east-central part of the state, based in Knoxville, and is largely coextensive with that city's metropolitan area. It has been represented by Republican Jimmy Duncan since November 1988. He ran against Democrat Bob Scott. No Democrat has held this seat since 1855.

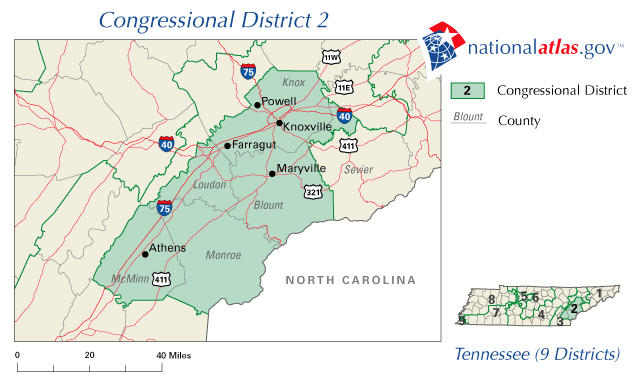

=== Democratic primary ===
- John Greene
- Write-Ins

Democratic primary results
Party	Candidate	Votes	%
Democratic	John Greene	23,885	100.0%
Democratic	Write-Ins	3	0.0%
Total votes		23,888	100.0%

=== Republican primary ===
- John J. Duncan Jr.
- Jim Pendergrass

Republican primary results
Party	Candidate	Votes	%
Republican	John J. Duncan Jr.	67,582	91.7%
Republican	Jim Pendergrass	6,095	8.3%
Total votes		73,677	100.0%

=== Predictions ===
Source	Ranking	As of
Sabato's Crystal Ball	Safe R	November 4, 2002
New York Times	Safe R	October 14, 2002

=== Results ===
Tennessee's 2nd congressional district election, 2002
Party	Candidate	Votes	%
Republican	Jimmy Duncan (inc.)	146,887	78.98%
Democratic	John Greene	37,035	19.91%
Independent	Joshua Williamson	1,110	0.60%
Independent	George Njezic	940	0.51%
Write-In	Write-ins	9	0.00%
Total votes		185,981	100.00%
Republican hold			

== District 3 ==
2002 Tennessee's 3rd congressional district election
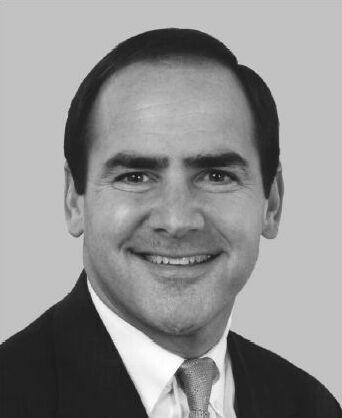

Nominee	Zach Wamp	John Wolfe
Party	Republican	Democratic
Popular vote	112,254	58,824
Percentage	64.54%	33.82%
- County results Wamp: 50–60% 60–70% 70–80%
U.S. Representative before election
Zach Wamp
Republican
Elected U.S. Representative
Zach Wamp
Republican

Tennessee’s 3rd congressional district, which stretches from the Chattanooga metropolitan area in southern Tennessee to Claiborne County in northern Tennessee, is strongly conservative and has been represented by Republican Congressman Zach Wamp since his initial 1994 election.

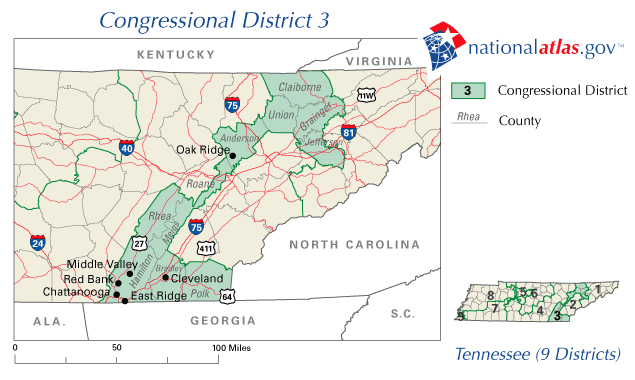

=== Democratic primary ===
- Norman E. Knott, Jr.
- John Wolfe
- Write-Ins

Democratic primary results
Party	Candidate	Votes	%
Democratic	Norman E. Knott, Jr.	11,517	33.5%
Democratic	John Wolfe	22,731	66.1%
Democratic	Write-Ins	150	0.4%
Total votes		34,398	100.0%

=== Republican primary ===
- Zach Wamp
- Write-Ins

Republican primary results
Party	Candidate	Votes	%
Republican	Zach Wamp	59,410	99.3%
Republican	Write-Ins	392	0.7%
Total votes		59,802	100.0%

=== Predictions ===
Source	Ranking	As of
Sabato's Crystal Ball	Safe R	November 4, 2002
New York Times	Safe R	October 14, 2002

=== Results ===
Tennessee's 3rd congressional district election, 2002
Party	Candidate	Votes	%
Republican	Zach Wamp (inc.)	112,254	64.54%
Democratic	John Wolfe	58,824	33.82%
Independent	William C. Bolen	1,743	1.00%
Independent	Timothy A. Sevier	947	0.54%
Write-In	Write-ins	153	0.09%
Total votes		173,921	100.00%
Republican hold			

== District 4 ==
2002 Tennessee's 4th congressional district election
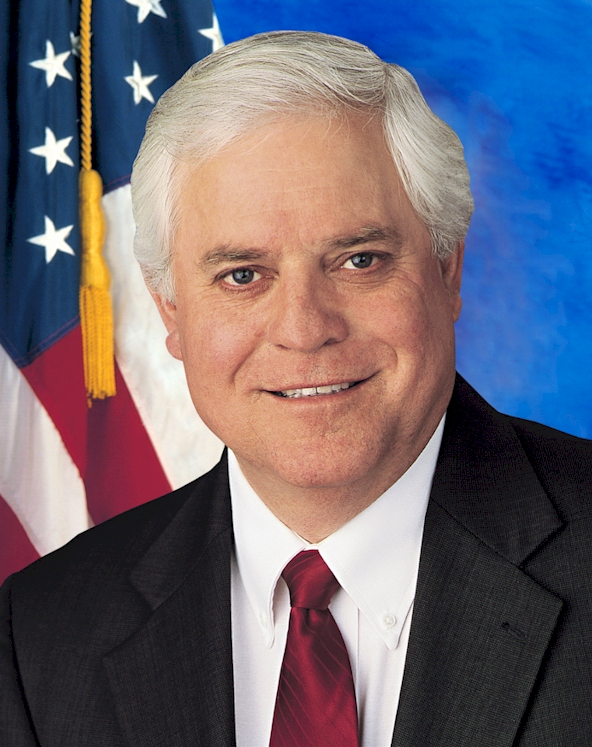

Nominee	Lincoln Davis	Janice Bowling
Party	Democratic	Republican
Popular vote	95,989	85,680
Percentage	52.08%	46.49%
- County results Davis: 50–60% 60–70% Bowling: 40–50% 50–60% 60–70%
U.S. Representative before election
Van Hilleary
Republican
Elected U.S. Representative
Lincoln Davis
Democratic

Four-term Republican incumbent Van Hilleary gave up the seat to make what would ultimately be an unsuccessful run for governor. Democratic State Senator Lincoln Davis won the open seat, narrowly defeating Republican Tullahoma Alderman Janice Bowling, 52.1%-46.5%.

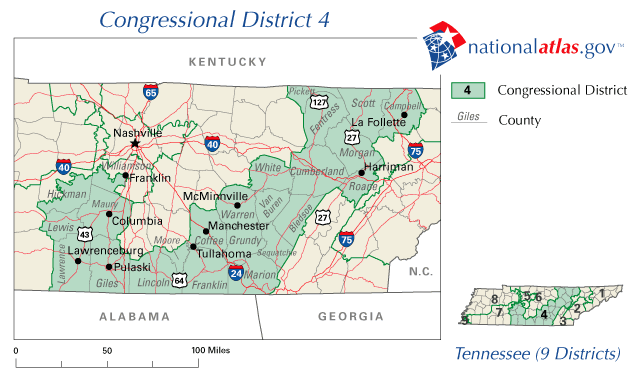

=== Predictions ===
Source	Ranking	As of
Sabato's Crystal Ball	Lean D (flip)	November 4, 2002
New York Times	Lean D (flip)	October 14, 2002

=== Republican primary ===
A field of Republican candidates competed for the nomination to succeed incumbent Congressman Van Hilleary, who vacated the seat to run for governor of Tennessee. State Senator Janice Bowling, then a Tullahoma alderwoman, won the nomination with a plurality of the vote, defeating several challengers including Mike Greene and future Congressman Andy Ogles, who was among the better-financed contenders in the race but finished third.

Republican primary results
Party	Candidate	Votes	%
Republican	Janice Bowling	20,709	37.10%
Republican	Mike Greene	13,563	24.30%
Republican	Andy Ogles	8,201	14.69%
Republican	John Bumpus	7,245	12.98%
Republican	Mike Coffield	4,991	8.94%
Republican	Harvey Howard	1,063	1.91%
Republican	Write-ins	41	0.07%
Total votes		55,813	100.00%

=== Democratic primary ===
State Senator Lincoln Davis won the Democratic primary against a self-funding opponent, Fran Marcum of Tullahoma, who spent nearly $2 million in the race.

Democratic primary results
Party	Candidate	Votes	%
Democratic	Lincoln Davis	48.843	57.00%
Democratic	Fran Marcum	36,779	42.92%
Democratic	Write-in	64	0.07%
Total votes		85,686	100.00%

=== Results ===
Tennessee's 4th congressional district election, 2002
Party	Candidate	Votes	%
Democratic	Lincoln Davis	95,989	52.08%
Republican	Janice Bowling	85,680	46.49%
Independent	William Tharon Chandler	1,073	0.58%
Independent	John Ray	605	0.33%
Independent	Bert Mason	504	0.27%
Independent	Ed Wellmann	399	0.22%
Write-In	Write-ins	50	0.03%
Total votes		184,300	100.00%
Democratic gain from Republican			

== District 5 ==
2002 Tennessee's 5th congressional district election
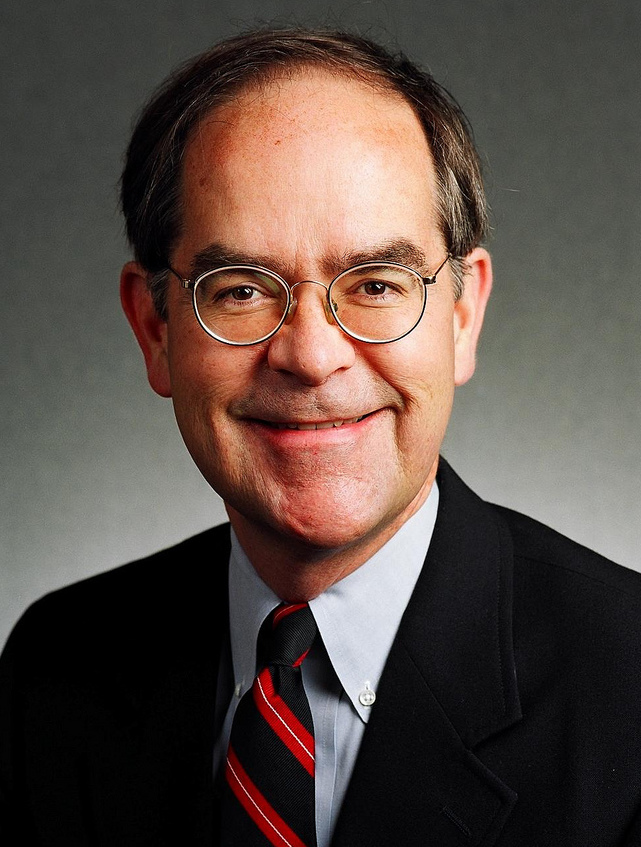

Nominee	Jim Cooper	Robert Duvall
Party	Democratic	Republican
Popular vote	108,903	56,825
Percentage	63.73%	33.25%
- County results Cooper: 50–60% 60–70% Duvall: 40–50%
U.S. Representative before election
Bob Clement
Democratic
Elected U.S. Representative
Jim Cooper
Democratic

Tennessee’s 5th congressional district was centered on Nashville and included portions of the surrounding area. The district was anchored by the majority of Nashville–Davidson County, making Nashville its largest city and primary population center. In addition to Nashville, the district extended into parts of Cheatham County and Wilson County. This included communities such as Ashland City, Pleasant View, and Pegram in Cheatham County, as well as most of Lebanon, as well as Mount Juliet, and Green Hill in Wilson County.

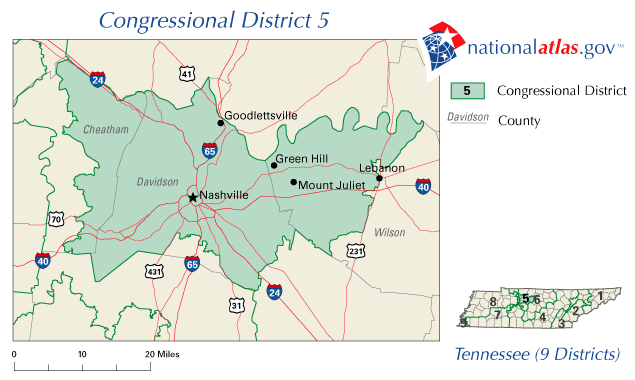

=== Democratic primary ===
- John Arriola
- Jim Cooper
- Carlton Cornett
- Adam Cox
- David C. Mills
- Gayle Ray
- Ronnie Steine
- Write-Ins

Democratic primary results
Party	Candidate	Votes	%
Democratic	Jim Cooper	32,651	46.7%
Democratic	John Arriola	16,878	24.2%
Democratic	Gayle Ray	16,087	23.0%
Democratic	David C. Mills	1,657	2.4%
Democratic	Ronnie Steine	901	1.3%
Democratic	Carlton Cornett	1,096	1.6%
Democratic	Adam Cox	593	0.8%
Democratic	Write-Ins	21	0.0%
Total votes		69,884	100.0%

=== Republican primary ===
- Remo Circo
- Robert Duvall
- Thomas W. Lawless
- Ben J. Tomeo
- Kevin Wilkinson
- Write-Ins

Republican primary results
Party	Candidate	Votes	%
Republican	Robert Duvall	11,572	45.3%
Republican	Thomas W. Lawless	5,759	22.5%
Republican	Kevin Wilkinson	5,608	21.9%
Republican	Remo Circo	2,009	7.9%
Republican	Ben J. Tomeo	600	2.3%
Republican	Write-Ins	23	0.1%
Total votes		25,571	100.0%

=== Predictions ===
Source	Ranking	As of
Sabato's Crystal Ball	Safe D	November 4, 2002
New York Times	Safe D	October 14, 2002

=== Results ===
Tennessee's 5th congressional district election, 2002
Party	Candidate	Votes	%
Democratic	Jim Cooper	108,903	63.73%
Republican	Robert Duvall	56,825	33.25%
Independent	John Jay Hooker	3,063	1.79%
Independent	Jonathan D. Farley	1,205	0.71%
Independent	Jesse Turner	877	0.51%
Write-In	Write-ins	13	0.01%
Total votes		170,886	100.00%
Democratic hold			

== District 6 ==
2002 Tennessee's 6th congressional district election
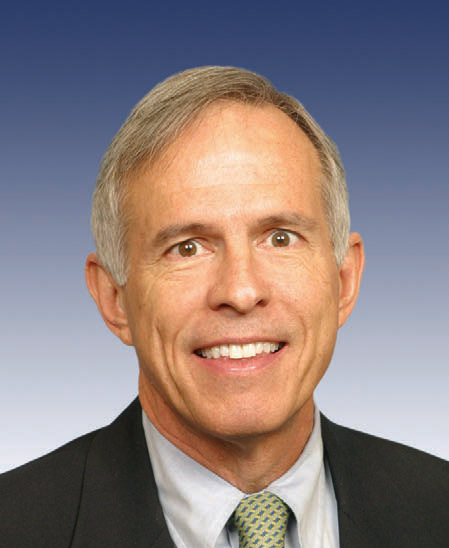

Nominee	Bart Gordon	Robert L. Garrison
Party	Democratic	Republican
Popular vote	117,034	57,401
Percentage	65.92%	32.33%
- County results Gordon: 50–60% 60–70% 70–80% 80–90%
U.S. Representative before election
Bart Gordon
Democratic
Elected U.S. Representative
Bart Gordon
Democratic

Tennessee’s 6th congressional district lied in Middle Tennessee, including all of Bedford, Cannon, Clay, DeKalb, Jackson, Macon, Marshall, Overton, Putnam, Robertson, Rutherford, Smith, Sumner, and Trousdale Counties, as well as a portion of Wilson County. It had been represented by Democrat Bart Gordon since 1985.

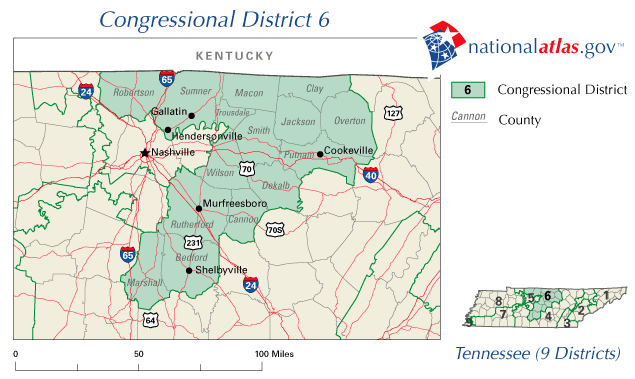

=== Democratic primary ===
- Bart Gordon
- Harvey Howard
- Write-Ins

Democratic primary results
Party	Candidate	Votes	%
Democratic	Bart Gordon	69,121	91.6%
Democratic	Harvey Howard	6,255	8.3%
Democratic	Write-Ins	99	0.1%
Total votes		75,475	100.0%

=== Republican primary ===
- Robert L. Garrison
- Write-Ins

Republican primary results
Party	Candidate	Votes	%
Republican	Robert L. Garrison	34,329	99.6%
Republican	Write-Ins	147	0.4%
Total votes		34,476	100.0%

=== Predictions ===
Source	Ranking	As of
Sabato's Crystal Ball	Safe D	November 4, 2002
New York Times	Safe D	October 14, 2002

=== Results ===
Tennessee's 6th congressional district election, 2002
Party	Candidate	Votes	%
Democratic	Bart Gordon (inc.)	117,034	65.92%
Republican	Robert L. Garrison	57,401	32.33%
Independent	J. Patrick Lyons	3,065	1.73%
Write-In	Write-ins	47	0.03%
Total votes		177,547	100.00%
Democratic hold			

== District 7 ==
2002 Tennessee's 7th congressional district election
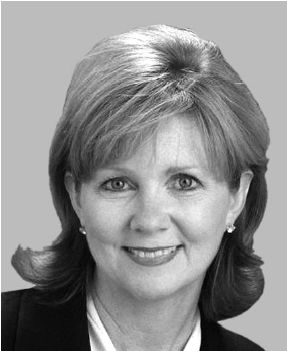

Nominee	Marsha Blackburn	Tim Barron
Party	Republican	Democratic
Popular vote	138,314	51,790
Percentage	70.73%	26.48%
- County results Blackburn: 50–60% 60–70% 70–80% Barron: 40–50%
U.S. Representative before election
Ed Bryant
Republican
Elected U.S. Representative
Marsha Blackburn
Republican

Tennessee’s 7th congressional district was significantly redrawn following the 2000 census. The newly drawn district stretched from portions of Shelby County in West Tennessee through parts of Middle Tennessee which included the majority of Williamson County and a part of southern suburban Nashville and northward to include Clarksville in Montgomery County, resulting in an unusually long and narrow configuration that combined distant suburban and rural areas into a single congressional district. Critics of the 2002 plan described the changes as a partisan gerrymander by the Democratic-controlled Tennessee General Assembly, which added more Republican-leaning suburbs and retained rural communities, keeping a district that concentrated GOP voters and functioned effectively as a vote sink. Incumbent Republican Ed Bryant decided to run for the Senate election.

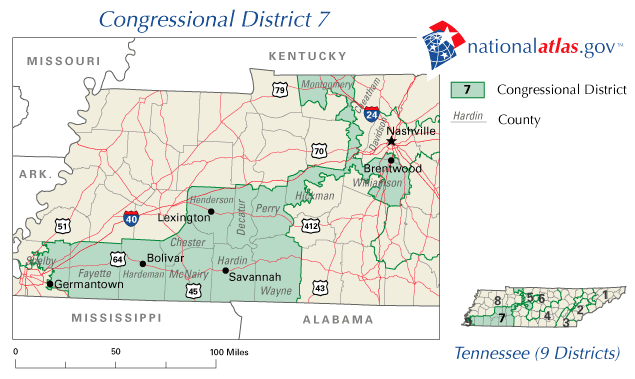

=== Democratic primary ===
- Tim Barron
- Omer R. Hayden
- Write-Ins

Democratic primary results
Party	Candidate	Votes	%
Democratic	Tim Barron	22,789	71.0%
Democratic	Omer R. Hayden	9,262	28.9%
Democratic	Write-Ins	25	0.1%
Total votes		32,076	100.0%

=== Republican primary ===
==== Nominee ====
- Marsha Blackburn, state senator

==== Eliminated in primary ====
- Brent Taylor, city councilor
- David Kustoff, former chair of the Republican Party of Shelby County and George W. Bush's campaign chair in Tennessee
- Forrest Shoaf
- Mark Norris, state senator
- Randy Starkey
- Sonny Carlota

Republican primary results
Party	Candidate	Votes	%
Republican	Marsha Blackburn	36,633	40.32%
Republican	David Kustoff	18,392	20.24%
Republican	Brent Taylor	14,139	15.56%
Republican	Mark Norris	13,104	14.42%
Republican	Forrest Shoaf	7,319	8.06%
Republican	Sonny Carlota	642	0.71%
Republican	Randy Starkey	628	0.69%
Write-in		9	0.00%
Total votes		90,866	100.00%

=== Predictions ===
Source	Ranking	As of
Sabato's Crystal Ball	Safe R	November 4, 2002
New York Times	Safe R	October 14, 2002

=== Results ===
Tennessee's 7th congressional district election, 2002
Party	Candidate	Votes	%
Republican	Marsha Blackburn	138,314	70.73%
Democratic	Tim Barron	51,790	26.48%
Independent	Rick Patterson	5,423	2.77%
Write-In	Write-ins	31	0.02%
Total votes		195,558	100.00%
Republican hold			

== District 8 ==
2002 Tennessee's 8th congressional district election
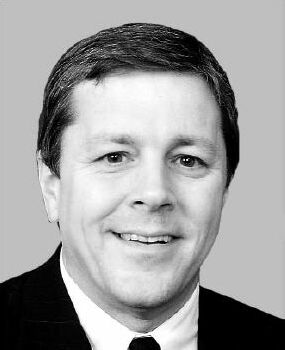

Nominee	John S. Tanner	Mat McClain
Party	Democratic	Republican
Popular vote	117,811	45,853
Percentage	70.14%	27.30%
- County results Tanner: 50–60% 60–70% 70–80% 80–90%
U.S. Representative before election
John S. Tanner
Democratic
Elected U.S. Representative
John S. Tanner
Democratic

This Republican-leaning district, rooted in the northwestern portion of the state, had been represented by moderate Democratic Congressman John S. Tanner since 1989. Tanner ran for re-election, and easily defeated Republican candidate Mat McClain, carrying every county.

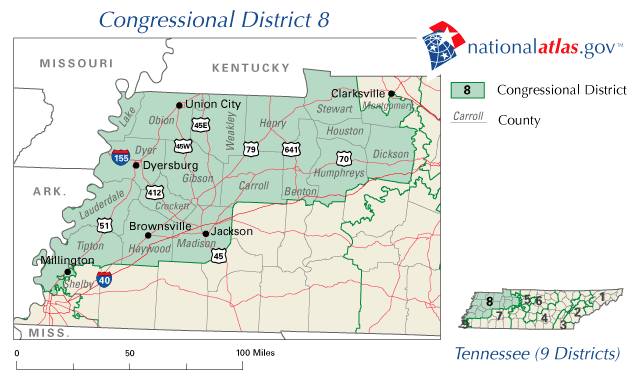

=== Democratic primary ===
- John Tanner
- Richard Ward
- Write-Ins

Democratic primary results
Party	Candidate	Votes	%
Democratic	John Tanner	66,015	86.8%
Democratic	Richard Ward	10,069	13.2%
Democratic	Write-Ins	12	0.0%
Total votes		76,096	100.0%

=== Republican primary ===
- Mat McClain
- Bill Warren
- Write-Ins

Republican primary results
Party	Candidate	Votes	%
Republican	Mat McClain	18,878	56.5%
Republican	Bill Warren	14,531	43.5%
Republican	Write-Ins	26	0.1%
Total votes		33,435	100.0%

=== Predictions ===
Source	Ranking	As of
Sabato's Crystal Ball	Safe D	November 4, 2002
New York Times	Safe D	October 14, 2002

=== Results ===
Tennessee's 8th congressional district election, 2002
Party	Candidate	Votes	%
Democratic	John Tanner (inc.)	117,811	70.14%
Republican	Mat McClain	45,853	27.30%
Independent	James L. Hart	4,288	2.55%
Write-In	Write-ins	18	0.01%
Total votes		167,970	100.00%
Democratic hold			

== District 9 ==
2002 Tennessee's 9th congressional district election
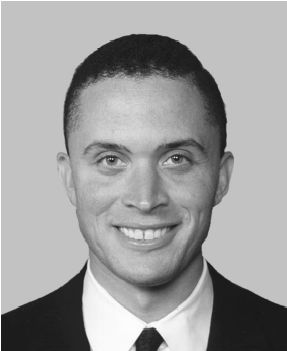

Nominee	Harold Ford Jr.	Tony Rush
Party	Democratic	Independent
Popular vote	120,904	23,208
Percentage	83.81%	16.09%
- County results Ford: 80–90%
U.S. Representative before election
Harold Ford Jr.
Democratic
Elected U.S. Representative
Harold Ford Jr.
Democratic

Tennessee’s 9th congressional district, based exclusively within the city of Memphis, has the distinction of being the state's most liberal district, the only district contained within one county, and Tennessee's only African-American majority district. Incumbent Democratic Congressman Harold Ford, Jr. had represented this district since his initial 1996 election.

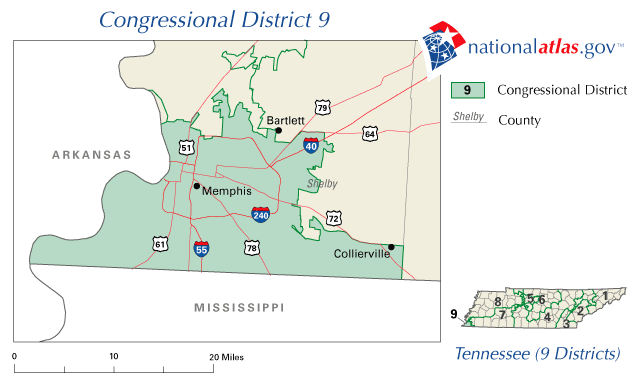

=== Democratic primary ===
- Harold Ford Jr.
- Write-Ins

Democratic primary results
Party	Candidate	Votes	%
Democratic	Harold Ford Jr.	79,146	99.9%
Democratic	Write-Ins	46	0.1%
Total votes		79,192	100.0%

=== Republican primary ===
- Write-Ins

Republican primary results
Party	Candidate	Votes	%
Republican	Write-Ins	5	100.0%
Total votes		5	100.0%

=== Predictions ===
Source	Ranking	As of
Sabato's Crystal Ball	Safe D	November 4, 2002
New York Times	Safe D	October 14, 2002

=== Results ===
Tennessee's 9th congressional district election, 2002
Party	Candidate	Votes	%
Democratic	Harold Ford Jr. (inc.)	120,904	83.81%
Independent	Tony Rush	23,208	16.09%
Write-In	Write-ins	148	0.10%
Total votes		144,260	100.00%
Democratic hold			

== See also ==
- 2002 United States Senate election in Tennessee
- 2002 Tennessee elections
- 2002 United States elections
