= 1994 United States House of Representatives elections in Tennessee =

- November 8, 1994

All 9 Tennessee seats to the United States House of Representatives
	Majority party	Minority party
Party	Republican	Democratic
Last election	3	6
Seats won	5	4
Seat change	▲2	▼2
Popular vote	775,843	614,512
Percentage	54.77%	43.38%
Swing	▲12.02%	▼7.79%

Republican hold Republican gain
Democratic hold
Republican
40–50%
50–60%
60–70%
70–80%
80–90%
90–100%
Democratic
40–50%
50–60%
60–70%
70–80%

The 1994 congressional elections in Tennessee were held on November 8, 1994, to determine who would represent the state of Tennessee in the United States House of Representatives.

Following the 1994 elections, Republicans gained two seats, putting the Tennessee delegation at a 5-4 Republican majority. The last time Republicans won a majority in the House delegation was in 1972.

== Overview ==
United States House of Representatives elections in Tennessee, 1994
Party	Votes	Percentage	Seats	+/–
Republican	775,843	54.77%	5	▲2
Democratic	614,512	43.38%	4	▼2
Independents	26,069	1.84%	0	—
Write-ins	78	0.01%	0	—
Totals	1,416,502	100.00%	9	—

Popular vote
Republican	54.77%
Democratic	43.38%
Other	1.85%

House seats
Republican	55.56%
Democratic	44.44%

=== By district ===
District	Incumbent			This race	
District	Representative	Party	First elected	Results	Candidates
Tennessee 1	Jimmy Quillen	Republican	1962	Incumbent re-elected.	▌ ✓ Jimmy Quillen (Republican) 72.9%; ▌J. Carr Christian (Democratic) 24.6%; ▌George Mauer (Independent) 2.5%
Tennessee 2	Jimmy Duncan	Republican	1988	Incumbent re-elected.	▌ ✓ Jimmy Duncan (Republican) 90.5%; ▌Randon J. Krieg (Independent) 4.8%; ▌Greg Samples (Independent) 4.7%
Tennessee 3	Marilyn Lloyd	Democratic	1974	Incumbent retired. Republican gain.	▌ ✓ Zach Wamp (Republican) 52.3%; ▌Randy Button (Democratic) 45.6%; ▌Thomas Ed Morrrell (Independent) 1.2%; ▌Richard M. Sims (Independent) 0.9%
Tennessee 4	Jim Cooper	Democratic	1982	Incumbent retired to run for U.S. senator. Republican gain.	▌ ✓ Van Hilleary (Republican) 56.6%; ▌Jeff Whorley (Democratic) 42.0%; ▌J. Patrick Lyons (Independent) 1.4%
Tennessee 5	Bob Clement	Democratic	1988	Incumbent re-elected.	▌ ✓ Bob Clement (Democratic) 60.2%; ▌John Osborne (Republican) 38.7%; Others: ▌Lloyd Botway (Independent) 0.6%; ▌Chuck Lokey (Independent) 0.4%
Tennessee 6	Bart Gordon	Democratic	1984	Incumbent re-elected.	▌ ✓ Bart Gordon (Democratic) 50.6%; ▌Steve Gill (Republican) 49.4%
Tennessee 7	Don Sundquist	Republican	1982	Incumbent retired to run for governor of Tennessee. Republican hold.	▌ ✓ Ed Bryant (Republican) 60.2%; ▌Harold Byrd (Democratic) 38.6%; ▌Tom Jeanette (Independent) 1.1%
Tennessee 8	John Tanner	Democratic	1988	Incumbent re-elected.	▌ ✓ John Tanner (Democratic) 63.8%; ▌Neal R. Morris (Republican) 36.2%
Tennessee 9	Harold Ford Sr.	Democratic	1974	Incumbent re-elected.	▌ ✓ Harold Ford Sr. (Democratic) 57.8%; ▌Roderick DeBerry (Republican) 42.2%

== District 1 ==
Tennessee's 1st congressional district election, 1994
Party	Candidate	Votes	%
Republican	Jimmy Quillen (inc.)	102,947	72.89%
Democratic	J. Carr Christian	34,691	24.56%
Independent	George Mauer	3,576	2.53%
Write-In	Write-ins	13	0.01%
Total votes		141,227	100.00%
Republican hold			

== District 2 ==
Tennessee's 2nd congressional district election, 1994
Party	Candidate	Votes	%
Republican	Jimmy Duncan (inc.)	128,937	90.49%
Independent	Randon J. Krieg	6,854	4.81%
Independent	Greg Samples	6,682	4.69%
Write-In	Write-ins	9	0.01%
Total votes		142,482	100.00%
Republican hold			

== District 3 ==
1994 Tennessee's 3rd congressional district election
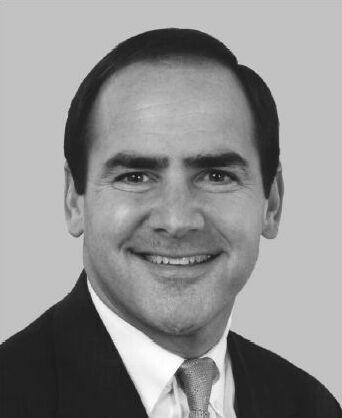

Nominee	Zach Wamp	Randy Button
Party	Republican	Democratic
Popular vote	84,583	73,839
Percentage	52.26%	45.62%
- County results Wamp: 50–60% 60–70% Button: 50–60% 60–70%
U.S. Representative before election
Marilyn Lloyd
Democratic
Elected U.S. Representative
Zach Wamp
Republican

Tennessee's 3rd congressional district lies in East Tennessee, anchored by Chattanooga and surrounding communities. It included all of Anderson, Bledsoe, Grundy, Hamilton, Marion, Meigs, Morgan, Polk, Roane, Sequatchie, and Van Buren counties, as well as part of Bradley County. The district had been represented by Democrat Marilyn Lloyd, who had served since 1975. Lloyd did not seek re-election to the U.S. House in 1994 after a narrow 1992 victory. She retired and endorsed her successor, Republican Zach Wamp, in the general election.

Wamp's strength was concentrated in the district's population centers and most suburban areas. He posted his largest raw vote and margin in Hamilton County, home to Chattanooga, and also carried Bradley County, Bledsoe, Roane, and Sequatchie counties.

Democrat Randy Button performed best in a number of the district's smaller and more rural counties. He won Grundy, Marion, Meigs, Morgan, Polk, Van Buren, and Anderson counties. Despite those wins, Button's margins were not large enough to overcome Wamp's advantage in Hamilton County and other population centers.

=== Democratic primary ===
Democratic primary results
Party	Candidate	Votes	%
Democratic	Randy Button	12,402	25.02%
Democratic	Chuck Jolly	11,256	22.71%
Democratic	Whitney Durand	11,109	22.41%
Democratic	Ram Uppuluri	9,671	19.51%
Democratic	Eddie Patterson	3,210	6.48%
Democratic	Dean O'Leary	967	1.95%
Democratic	David Stacy	952	1.92%
Total votes		49,567	100.00%

=== Republican primary ===
Republican primary results
Party	Candidate	Votes	%
Republican	Zach Wamp	39,123	67.24%
Republican	Kenneth Meyer	14,561	25.03%
Republican	Kenneth Gross	3,213	5.52%
Republican	Larry Kuka	1,284	2.21%
Total votes		58,181	100.00%

=== Results ===
Tennessee's 3rd congressional district election, 1994
Party	Candidate	Votes	%
Republican	Zach Wamp	84,583	52.26%
Democratic	Randy Button	73,839	45.62%
Independent	Thomas Ed Morrrell	1,929	1.19%
Independent	Richard M. Sims	1,498	0.93%
Write-In	Write-ins	4	0.00%
Total votes		161,853	100.00%
Republican gain from Democratic			

== District 4 ==
1994 Tennessee's 4th congressional district election
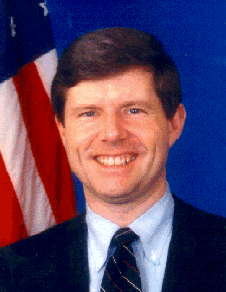

Nominee	Van Hilleary	Jeff Whorley
Party	Republican	Democratic
Popular vote	81,539	60,489
Percentage	56.63%	42.01%
- County results Hilleary: 40–50% 50–60% 60–70% 70–80% Whorley: 50–60%
U.S. Representative before election
Jim Cooper
Democratic
Elected U.S. Representative
Van Hilleary
Republican

Tennessee's 4th congressional district was located in Middle Tennessee and East Tennessee, stretching across a largely rural region with small cities and manufacturing communities. The district included Bedford, Campbell, Claiborne, Coffee, Cumberland, Fentress, Franklin, Giles, Grainger, Hamblen, Hardin, Lawrence, Lincoln, Moore, Pickett, Rhea, Scott, Union, Warren, Wayne, and White counties, as well as part of Knox County.

Prior to the 1994 election, the district had been represented by six-term Democrat Jim Cooper, first elected in 1982. Cooper chose not to seek re-election to the U.S. House and instead ran for the United States Senate that year; he became the Democratic nominee in the special Senate election but was defeated by Republican Fred Thompson.

With Cooper's retirement, the open seat drew Republican and Democratic candidates in a year that saw substantial Republican gains nationwide. In the general election, Republican Van Hilleary defeated Democratic nominee Jeff Whorley, winning relatively comfortably and flipping the seat Republican.

Hilleary's strength was concentrated across much of the district's eastern and Upper Cumberland counties, where he built large margins. He also carried most of the district's more rural counties by comfortable margins.

Whorley performed best in some of the district's southern and more Democratic-leaning counties. He carried Bedford, Franklin, Giles, Warren, and White counties, generally by modest margins.

=== Democratic primary ===
Democratic primary results
Party	Candidate	Votes	%
Democratic	Jeff Whorley	20,756	30.66%
Democratic	Lincoln Davis	18,032	26.63%
Democratic	Andy Hoover	16,485	24.35%
Democratic	Calvin Moore	10,363	15.31%
Democratic	John Dooley	2,066	3.05%
Democratic	Other	3	0.00%
Total votes		67,705	100.00%

=== Republican primary ===
Republican primary results
Party	Candidate	Votes	%
Republican	Van Hilleary	20,798	58.06%
Republican	Keith Hayworth	9,913	27.67%
Republican	Clay Sanders	5,112	14.27%
Republican	Other	2	0.00%
Total votes		35,825	100.00%

=== Results ===
Tennessee's 4th congressional district election, 1994
Party	Candidate	Votes	%
Republican	Van Hilleary	81,539	56.63%
Democratic	Jeff Whorley	60,489	42.01%
Independent	J. Patrick Lyons	1,944	1.35%
Write-In	Write-ins	4	0.00%
Total votes		143,976	100.00%
Republican gain from Democratic			

== District 5 ==
Tennessee's 5th congressional district election, 1994
Party	Candidate	Votes	%
Democratic	Bob Clement (inc.)	95,953	60.23%
Republican	John Osborne	61,692	38.73%
Independent	Lloyd Botway	978	0.61%
Independent	Chuck Lokey	664	0.42%
Write-In	Write-ins	17	0.01%
Total votes		159,304	100.00%
Democratic hold			

== District 6 ==
1994 Tennessee's 6th congressional district election
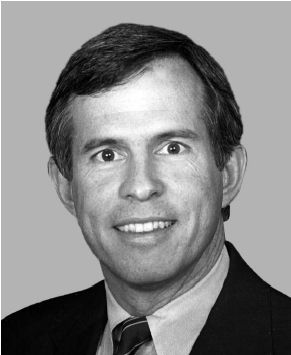

Nominee	Bart Gordon	Steve Gill
Party	Democratic	Republican
Popular vote	90,933	88,759
Percentage	50.60%	49.39%
- County results Gordon: 50–60% 60–70% Gill: 60–70%
U.S. Representative before election
Bart Gordon
Democratic
Elected U.S. Representative
Bart Gordon
Democratic

Tennessee’s 6th congressional district lies in Middle Tennessee, including all of Cannon, Clay, DeKalb, Jackson, Macon, Marshall, Overton, Putnam, Rutherford, Smith, Sumner, Trousdale, Wilson, and Williamson Counties, as well as a small southern portion of Davidson County. It had been represented by Democrat Bart Gordon since 1985.

Bart Gordon won every rural county in the district and ran up particularly large margins in the Upper Cumberland, including Jackson, Overton, Smith, and Trousdale. He also carried Cannon, Clay, DeKalb, Macon, Marshall, Putnam, Rutherford, and Sumner.

Republican Steve Gill performed best in the district's suburban areas. He won the Williamson County portion of the district by a wide margin and also carried the suburban precincts in the district's share of Davidson County. Those margins, however, were not large enough to offset Gordon's strength in the district's rural and exurban areas.

=== Democratic primary ===
Democratic primary results
Party	Candidate	Votes	%
Democratic	Bart Gordon (incumbent)	50,751	68.40%
Democratic	Dan Rudd	23,446	31.60%
Democratic	Other	3	0.0%
Total votes		74,200	100.00%
Democratic hold			

=== Republican primary ===
Republican primary results
Party	Candidate	Votes	%
Republican	Steve Gill	29,245	99.99%
Republican	Other	4	0.01%
Total votes		29,249	100.00%

=== Results ===
Tennessee's 6th congressional district election, 1994
Party	Candidate	Votes	%
Democratic	Bart Gordon (inc.)	90,933	50.60%
Republican	Steve Gill	88,759	49.39%
Write-In	Write-ins	7	0.01%
Total votes		179,699	100.00%
Democratic hold			

== District 7 ==
1994 Tennessee's 7th congressional district election
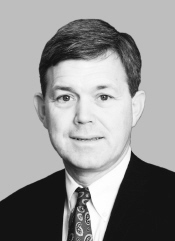

Nominee	Ed Bryant	Harold Byrd
Party	Republican	Democratic
Popular vote	102,587	65,851
Percentage	60.21%	38.65%
- County results Bryant: 50–60% 60–70% 70–80% Byrd: 40–50% 50–60%
U.S. Representative before election
Don Sundquist
Republican
Elected U.S. Representative
Ed Bryant
Republican

Tennessee's 7th congressional district was located in Middle Tennessee and West Tennessee, encompassing a mix of rural counties, small towns, and a portion of Shelby County. The district included Cheatham, Chester, Decatur, Dickson, Fayette, Hardeman, Henderson, Hickman, Lewis, Maury, McNairy, Montgomery, Perry, part of Robertson, and part of Shelby counties.

The seat was open following the retirement of the incumbent, Republican Don Sundquist, who successfully ran for governor.

Republican nominee Ed Bryant performed well mainly in the West Tennessee counties and overwhelmingly in the portion of Shelby County within the district, giving him a comfortable overall margin.

Democratic nominee Harold Bryant did well in the northern parts of the district in Middle Tennessee, but his gains were not sufficient to come close to Bryant’s advantage in Shelby County and other southern parts of the district.

=== Democratic primary ===
Democratic primary results
Party	Candidate	Votes	%
Democratic	Harold Byrd	20,536	35.98%
Democratic	Don Trotter	13,238	23.20%
Democratic	Peggy Knight	8,532	14.95%
Democratic	Frank Lashlee	7,661	13.42%
Democratic	Guthrie Castle	7,109	12.45%
Total votes		57,076	100.00%

=== Republican primary ===
Republican primary results
Party	Candidate	Votes	%
Republican	Ed Bryant	21,776	34.93%
Republican	Charles Salvaggio	20,269	32.51%
Republican	Maida Pearson	10,157	16.29%
Republican	Aaron Tatum	3,410	5.47%
Republican	Scotty Kelly	3,370	5.41%
Republican	Willard Summers	2,192	3.52%
Republican	Patrick Hales	1,173	1.88%
Total votes		62,347	100.00%

=== Results ===
Tennessee's 7th congressional district election, 1994
Party	Candidate	Votes	%
Republican	Ed Bryant	102,587	60.21%
Democratic	Harold Byrd	65,851	38.65%
Independent	Tom Jeanette	1,944	1.14%
Write-In	Write-ins	1	0.00%
Total votes		170,383	100.00%
Republican hold			

== District 8 ==
Tennessee's 8th congressional district election, 1994
Party	Candidate	Votes	%
Democratic	John Tanner (inc.)	97,951	63.80%
Republican	Neal R. Morris	55,573	36.19%
Write-In	Write-ins	14	0.01%
Total votes		153,538	100.00%
Democratic hold			

== District 9 ==
Tennessee's 9th congressional district election, 1994
Party	Candidate	Votes	%
Democratic	Harold Ford Sr. (inc.)	94,805	57.79%
Republican	Roderick DeBerry	69,226	42.20%
Write-In	Write-ins	9	0.01%
Total votes		164,040	100.00%
Democratic hold			

== See also ==
- 1994 United States Senate election in Tennessee
- 1994 United States Senate special election in Tennessee
- 1994 Tennessee gubernatorial election
- 1994 United States elections
