= 1994 Tennessee gubernatorial election =

- November 8, 1994
- Turnout: 56.62%
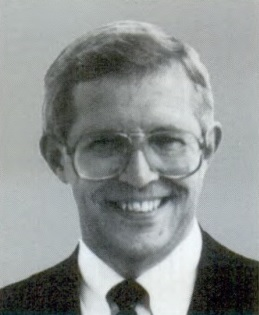

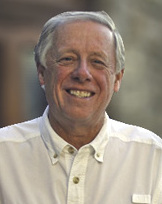
| Nominee | Don Sundquist | Phil Bredesen |
| Party | Republican | Democratic |
| Popular vote | 807,104 | 664,252 |
| Percentage | 54.27% | 44.67% |
- County results Sundquist: 40–50% 50–60% 60–70% 70–80% Bredesen: 40–50% 50–60% 60–70%
Governor before election
Ned McWherter
Democratic
Elected Governor
Don Sundquist
Republican

The 1994 Tennessee gubernatorial election took place on November 8, 1994 to elect the next governor of Tennessee. Incumbent Democratic governor Ned McWherter was term-limited, leaving the governorship an open seat. Republican congressman Don Sundquist was elected Governor of Tennessee, defeating Democratic nominee Phil Bredesen, the mayor of Nashville, who later won Tennessee's governorship in 2002 & 2006.

== Campaign ==
Democratic candidate Phil Bredesen criticized Republican candidate Don Sundquist for voting against a minimum wage increase while voting for a congressional pay raise. Sundquist accused Bredesen of flip-flopping on issues such as public funding for abortion and school privatization.

== Aftermath ==
Don Sundquist focused on government efficiency and welfare reform. He signed the "Families First" bill in 1996, which reduced the number of families on welfare from 70,000 to 30,000. He also signed a series of crime-related measures which called for tougher sentences and more focus on victims' rights. In 1996, Sundquist eliminated the state's scandal-ridden Public Service Commission, replacing it with the Tennessee Regulatory Authority. That same year, he created the Department of Children's Services.

== Republican primary ==
Don Sundquist easily won the nomination, winning over 80% of the vote in the primary to David Y. Copeland III.

== Democratic primary ==
Bredesen won the Democratic nomination for governor, capturing 53% of the vote in a primary that included more than a half-dozen candidates, among them Shelby County Mayor Bill Morris and state senator Steve Cohen.

== General election ==
Tennessee gubernatorial election, 1994
| Party | Candidate | Votes | % | ±% |
|---|---|---|---|---|
| Republican | Don Sundquist | 807,104 | 54.27% | +17.66% |
| Democratic | Phil Bredesen | 664,252 | 44.67% | −16.16% |
| Independent | Stephanie E. Holt | 9,981 | 0.67% | N/A |
| Independent | Will Smith | 3,365 | 0.23% | N/A |
| Independent | Charlie Moffett | 2,347 | 0.16% | N/A |
| N/A | Write-ins | 81 | 0.01% | N/A |
| Total votes | | 1,487,130 | 100.00% | |
| Republican gain from Democratic | | Swing | | |

== See also ==
- 1994 United States Senate election in Tennessee
- 1994 United States Senate special election in Tennessee
- 1994 United States House of Representatives elections in Tennessee
