= Jim Henry (Tennessee politician) =

American politician

James M. Henry

Chief of Staff and Deputy to the Governor
- Incumbent
- Assumed office June 30, 2015

Commissioner of the Tennessee Department of Children's Services
- In office 2013-June 2015

Commissioner of the Tennessee Department of Intellectual and Developmental Disabilities
- In office January 2011-2013

Member of the Tennessee House of Representatives from the 32nd district
- In office 1978–1990
- Preceded by: F. Chris Cawood
- Succeeded by: Dennis Ferguson

Mayor of Kingston, Tennessee
- In office ?-1978

Personal details
- Born: February 22, 1945 (age 81) Jefferson City, Tennessee, USA
- Party: Republican
- Relatives: Peter Turney; John Fotch Henry
- Education: Hiwassee College; University of Tennessee

James M. Henry (born February 22, 1945, in Jefferson City, Tennessee) was minority leader in the Tennessee House of Representatives from 1979 to 1991, and a 2002 candidate for the Republican Party nomination for governor of Tennessee, losing the primary election to U.S. Representative Van Hilleary, who in turn lost the subsequent general election to Tennessee governor Phil Bredesen. Henry has previously served as president and CEO of Omni Visions, Inc, first commissioner of the Tennessee Department of Intellectual and Developmental Disabilities, and commissioner of the Tennessee Department of Children's Services. Henry served as deputy to the governor and chief of staff to Bill Haslam.

== Early life and family ==
Henry was born to a family rich in political history. He is related to former Gov. Peter Turney of Winchester (1893–1897) and former Speaker of the Senate John Fotch Henry of Knoxville. He is not related, however to 1990 Tennessee Republican gubernatorial nominee Dwight Henry but is sometimes confused with him as both have been Republican candidates for governor of Tennessee, and both served in the Tennessee House of Representatives at the same time from nearby districts.

As a young man, Henry attended Hiwassee College and the University of Tennessee and served with distinction in the Vietnam War. Subsequent to his military service, Henry became active in veterans' issues and in the American Legion and Veterans of Foreign Wars.

== Political career ==
=== Kingston ===
Henry first served as a city councilman in Kingston, Tennessee, in 1971 at the age of 26. He remained on the Kingston Council for two years and then served as mayor of that city until 1978. He also became active in Republican circles (although the mayoralty of Kingston is a technically non-partisan office), rising relatively rapidly to be chairman of the Tennessee Republican Party.

=== State Legislature ===
In 1978, Henry was elected to the Tennessee House of Representatives from the 32nd District, in traditionally-Republican Roane County, of which Kingston is the county seat. He defeated incumbent Democratic State Representative F. Chris Cawood. In his first term, he served as chair of the Republican caucus, and upon his re-election in 1982 was made minority leader, in which position he served three two-year terms. During this time, Henry rode back and forth to sessions of the Tennessee General Assembly in Nashville with two famously partisan Democrats, state Senator Anna Belle Clement O'Brien and state Representative Tommy Burnett, and has stated that he learned from the experience that the vast majority of issues facing Tennessee are not particularly of a partisan nature or amenable to purely partisan solutions.

In 1989, Henry was appointed to the powerful Fiscal Review Committee, but in 1990 was narrowly defeated for a seventh term in the House by Dennis Ferguson. A combination of factors including a well known Republican, John Smith running as an Independent and low voter turnout led to Henry's narrow defeat.

=== Omni Visions, Inc ===
After his time in the state legislature concluded, Henry began to devote the majority of his efforts to his business working with the developmentally disabled (one of his own children has a developmental disability) and reaching out to children affected by drug abuse. He became the president and chief executive officer for Omni Visions, Inc, a company serving adults with developmental disabilities and children and families in crisis and which has business in several southern states.

=== Gubernatorial Campaign ===
In 2001, Henry was approached by state Republican leaders identified largely with the Sundquist Administration and the party's moderate wing with the intention of encouraging him to run for governor the next year. Henry agreed, despite facing long odds due to the party's increasing conservatism and the relative popularity of Fourth District U.S. Representative Van Hilleary, who had far superior name-recognition, in part due to the unusual configuration of his Congressional district, which at the time stretched from Virginia to Mississippi. Henry made every effort to run a statewide race, but was swamped in the August 2002 primary by Hilleary by a margin of about two to one, carrying only Roane and one adjacent county while Hilleary carried the other 93. Hilleary took Henry's challenge very seriously — too seriously, according to Hilleary critics — spending much money which others felt needed to be saved to use against Bredesen in the general election and needlessly alienating Henry's supporters, several of whom subsequently supported Bredesen or remained neutral, causing Hilleary's margin in East Tennessee to be less than that traditionally needed by Republicans to have a chance in statewide elections and helping lead to his defeat by Bredesen by a fairly narrow margin.

In 2005, Henry was again approached by some Republican leaders to run for governor, especially when it began to appear likely that no prominent Republican would challenge for the nomination to oppose Bredesen and that the nomination could go to a relative political unknown or perennial candidate. However, Henry quickly refused to mount a second gubernatorial run at the time. (Some Republicans' fears regarding the election were later allayed by the candidacy of state Senator Jim Bryson.)

=== Haslam Administration ===
Henry first joined the Haslam administration in January 2011 as the first commissioner of the Department of Intellectual and Developmental Disabilities (DIDD), and then later became the commissioner of the Department of Children's Services in 2013. After the departure of Mark Cate from the role of chief of staff and deputy to the governor, Henry was appointed to the position on June 30, 2015.
