= 2002 Tennessee gubernatorial election =

- November 5, 2002
- Turnout: 50.40% ▲17.87 pp
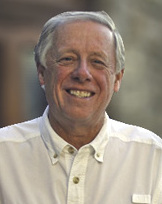

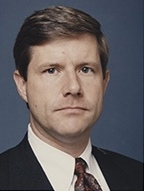
Nominee	Phil Bredesen	Van Hilleary
Party	Democratic	Republican
Popular vote	837,284	786,803
Percentage	50.65%	47.59%
- Bredesen: 40–50% 50–60% 60–70% 70–80% Hilleary: 40–50% 50–60% 60–70%
Governor before election
Don Sundquist
Republican
Elected Governor
Phil Bredesen
Democratic

The 2002 Tennessee gubernatorial election took place on November 5, 2002, to elect the next governor of Tennessee, alongside other state and local elections. Incumbent Republican governor Don Sundquist was term-limited and prohibited by the Constitution of Tennessee from seeking a third consecutive term. Former Democratic Nashville mayor Phil Bredesen was elected with 50.7% of the vote, narrowly defeating Republican nominee and U.S. Representative Van Hilleary. Until 2026, this was the last Tennessee gubernatorial race where the winner received less than 59% of votes.

With Bredesen's victory, the Tennessee Democratic Party regained a state government trifecta, with Democrats also controlling both chambers of the Tennessee General Assembly.

== Republican primary ==
=== Candidates ===
- Jim Henry, former minority leader of the Tennessee House of Representatives
- Van Hilleary, representative from Tennessee's 4th congressional district
- Dave Kelley
- Jessie D. McDonald
- Bob Tripp

=== Results ===
Republican primary results
Party	Candidate	Votes	%
Republican	Van Hilleary	343,543	64.31%
Republican	Jim Henry	159,862	29.92%
Republican	Bob Tripp	17,156	3.21%
Republican	Dave Kelley	8,581	1.61%
Republican	Jessie D. McDonald	4,682	0.88%
Republican	Write-ins	389	0.07%
Total votes		534,213	100.00%

== Democratic primary ==
=== Candidates ===
- L. Best
- Phil Bredesen, former mayor of Nashville, 1994 Democratic nominee for governor
- Charles V. Brown
- Floyd R. Conover
- Randy Nichols, Knox County district attorney general
- Charles E. Smith, former Tennessee commissioner of education

=== Results ===
Democratic primary results
Party	Candidate	Votes	%
Democratic	Phil Bredesen	426,418	79.05%
Democratic	Randy Nichols	38,322	7.10%
Democratic	Charles E. Smith	34,547	6.40%
Democratic	Charles V. Brown	17,506	3.25%
Democratic	L. Best	16,007	2.97%
Democratic	Floyd R. Conover	6,218	1.15%
Democratic	Write-ins	420	0.08%
Total votes		539,438	100.00%

== General election ==
=== Candidates ===
- Phil Bredesen (D)
- Van Hilleary (R)
- Edwin C. Sanders (I)
- Carl Two Feathers Whitaker (I)
- John Jay Hooker (I)
- David Gatchell (I)
- Gabriel Givens (I)
- Ray Ledford (I)
- James E. Herren (I)
- Charles V. Wilhoit Jr. (I)
- Marivuana Stout Leinoff (I)
- Francis E. Waldron (I)
- Ronny Simmons (I)
- Robert O. Watson (I)
- Basil Marceaux (I)

=== Campaign ===
Phil Bredesen promised to manage state government better, improve Tennessee's schools and use his experience as a managed-care executive to fix TennCare, which had created a critical budget shortfall toward the end of Sundquist's term. His reputation as a moderate Democrat was well established (he was a member of the "good government" faction of the Nashville Democratic Party), so Hilleary's attempts to brand him as a liberal ultimately failed. Republicans also suffered from governor Don Sundquist's unpopular attempts to implement a state income tax. Bredesen garnered more support in East Tennessee than was usual for a Democrat, especially one from Nashville.

=== Predictions ===
Source	Ranking	As of
The Cook Political Report	Tossup	October 31, 2002
Sabato's Crystal Ball	Lean D (flip)	November 4, 2002

=== Polling ===
Poll source	Date(s) administered	Sample size (Note: Key: A – all adults RV – registered voters LV – likely voters V – unclear)	Margin of error	Phil Bredesen (D)	Van Hilleary (R)	Other / Undecided
SurveyUSA	October 26–28, 2002	726 (LV)	± 3.8%	48%	44%	8%

=== Results ===

2002 Tennessee gubernatorial election
Party	Candidate	Votes	%	±%
Democratic	Phil Bredesen	837,284	50.65%	+21.17%
Republican	Van Hilleary	786,803	47.59%	−21.03%
Independent	Edwin C. Sanders	7,749	0.47%	N/A
Independent	Carl Two Feathers Whitaker	5,308	0.32%	N/A
Independent	John Jay Hooker	4,577	0.28%	N/A
Independent	David Gatchell	2,991	0.18%	N/A
Independent	Gabriel Givens	1,591	0.10%	N/A
Independent	Ray Ledford	1,589	0.10%	N/A
Independent	James E. Herren	1,210	0.07%	N/A
Independent	Charles V. Wilhoit, Jr.	898	0.05%	N/A
Independent	Marivuana Stout Leinoff	645	0.04%	N/A
Independent	Francis E. Waldron	635	0.04%	N/A
Independent	Ronny Simmons	630	0.04%	N/A
Independent	Robert O. Watson	579	0.04%	N/A
Independent	Basil Marceaux	302	0.02%	N/A
Write-ins		376	0.02%	N/A
Total votes		1,653,167	100.00%	
Democratic gain from Republican				

=== By county ===
County	Phil Bredesen Democratic		Van Hilleary Republican		Others Independent		Margin	Total votes
County	%	#	%	#	%	#	Margin	Total votes
Anderson	54.5%	12,526	44.1%	10,153	1.4%	318	2,373	22,997
Bedford	50.4%	5,098	48.1%	4,860	1.5%	156	238	10,114
Benton	64.7%	3,640	33.1%	1,863	2.2%	124	1,777	5,627
Bledsoe	48.2%	1,722	50.2%	1,795	1.6%	58	-73	3,575
Blount	42.5%	13,908	55.6%	18,189	1.9%	609	-4,281	32,706
Bradley	37.6%	9,178	60.4%	14,756	2.0%	506	-5,578	24,440
Campbell	54.3%	5,020	44.7%	4,129	1.0%	95	891	9,244
Cannon	57.8%	2,346	40.8%	1,654	1.4%	57	692	4,057
Carroll	54.4%	4,957	43.7%	3,982	1.9%	180	975	9,119
Carter	37.1%	5,877	60.9%	9,656	2.0%	329	-3,779	15,862
Cheatham	50.2%	5,538	48.0%	5,305	1.8%	198	233	11,041
Chester	42.1%	1,900	56.3%	2,544	1.6%	72	-644	4,516
Claiborne	49.2%	3,469	49.4%	3,483	1.4%	93	-14	7,045
Clay	59.7%	1,436	38.7%	932	1.6%	39	504	2,407
Cocke	49.5%	4,219	48.3%	4,114	2.2%	191	105	8,524
Coffee	50.5%	7,613	48.4%	7,286	1.1%	162	327	15,061
Crockett	52.6%	2,265	45.3%	1,951	2.1%	88	314	4,304
Cumberland	44.0%	7,437	54.6%	9,235	1.4%	239	-1,798	16,911
Davidson	58.5%	97,048	38.1%	63,176	3.4%	5,673	33,872	165,897
Decatur	56.6%	2,375	41.4%	1,738	2.0%	81	637	4,194
DeKalb	58.4%	2,929	40.4%	2,025	1.2%	63	904	5,017
Dickson	57.0%	7,810	41.4%	5,673	1.6%	217	2,137	13,700
Dyer	50.7%	5,114	47.0%	4,740	2.3%	227	374	10,081
Fayette	41.0%	3,798	57.2%	5,306	1.8%	166	-1,508	9,270
Fentress	42.8%	2,155	56.3%	2,832	0.9%	43	-677	5,030
Franklin	53.3%	6,312	45.3%	5,364	1.4%	159	948	11,835
Gibson	52.6%	7,700	45.4%	6,639	2.0%	289	1,061	14,628
Giles	52.9%	4,167	45.9%	3,616	1.2%	100	551	7,883
Grainger	45.8%	2,432	52.9%	2,809	1.3%	74	-377	5,315
Greene	41.4%	6,739	57.0%	9,280	1.6%	252	-2,541	16,271
Grundy	67.8%	2,524	31.0%	1,154	1.2%	42	1,370	3,720
Hamblen	44.4%	7,424	54.3%	9,069	1.3%	223	-1,645	16,716
Hamilton	46.3%	40,864	52.3%	46,109	1.4%	1,210	-5,245	88,183
Hancock	42.3%	829	56.0%	1,097	1.7%	32	-268	1,958
Hardeman	56.5%	3,891	41.0%	2,822	2.5%	172	1,069	6,885
Hardin	48.1%	3,594	51.1%	3,820	0.8%	62	-226	7,476
Hawkins	42.0%	5,921	56.0%	7,893	2.0%	269	-1,972	14,083
Haywood	59.3%	3,028	38.9%	1,986	1.8%	90	1,042	5,104
Henderson	43.2%	3,098	54.8%	3,933	2.0%	142	-835	7,173
Henry	59.8%	5,672	37.9%	3,598	2.3%	212	2,074	9,482
Hickman	60.3%	3,931	38.0%	2,477	1.7%	106	1,454	6,514
Houston	71.1%	1,970	27.1%	750	1.8%	50	1,220	2,770
Humphreys	65.0%	3,944	33.3%	2,023	1.7%	99	1,921	6,066
Jackson	67.5%	2,483	30.8%	1,135	1.7%	62	1,348	3,680
Jefferson	44.4%	5,293	54.1%	6,453	1.5%	176	-1,160	11,922
Johnson	36.3%	1,641	62.0%	2,802	1.7%	77	-1,161	4,520
Knox	49.4%	57,726	49.4%	57,683	1.2%	1,443	43	116,852
Lake	71.1%	1,128	25.2%	400	3.7%	58	728	1,586
Lauderdale	56.3%	3,621	41.4%	2,662	2.3%	154	959	6,437
Lawrence	47.0%	5,835	51.8%	6,430	1.2%	155	-595	12,420
Lewis	53.0%	2,026	44.5%	1,700	2.5%	95	326	3,821
Lincoln	43.1%	3,808	55.2%	4,877	1.7%	146	-1,069	8,831
Loudon	42.3%	5,995	56.7%	8,036	1.0%	149	-2,041	14,180
Macon	49.7%	2,554	48.9%	2,516	1.4%	70	38	5,140
Madison	48.9%	13,614	49.5%	13,770	1.6%	462	-156	27,846
Marion	60.3%	4,856	38.0%	3,062	1.7%	136	1,794	8,054
Marshall	57.5%	4,323	40.7%	3,065	1.8%	136	1,258	7,524
Maury	52.8%	10,862	45.3%	9,313	1.9%	378	1,549	20,553
McMinn	43.6%	5,919	54.5%	7,407	1.9%	261	-1,488	13,587
McNairy	48.0%	3,677	50.3%	3,849	1.7%	131	-172	7,657
Meigs	52.7%	1,486	45.5%	1,282	1.8%	51	204	2,819
Monroe	46.3%	5,081	52.1%	5,709	1.6%	174	-628	10,964
Montgomery	58.5%	18,714	39.8%	12,723	1.7%	561	5,991	31,998
Moore	45.9%	950	51.7%	1,070	2.4%	51	-120	2,071
Morgan	57.7%	3,128	41.5%	2,252	0.8%	44	876	5,424
Obion	57.7%	5,928	39.7%	4,083	2.6%	261	1,845	10,272
Overton	65.7%	4,027	32.6%	1,999	1.7%	99	2,028	6,125
Perry	59.8%	1,379	37.8%	871	2.4%	56	508	2,306
Pickett	40.1%	831	59.0%	1,221	0.9%	19	-390	2,071
Polk	56.0%	2,539	42.4%	1,925	1.6%	71	614	4,535
Putnam	54.4%	10,241	43.8%	8,241	1.8%	353	2,000	18,835
Rhea	33.3%	2,727	65.7%	5,383	1.0%	80	-2,656	8,190
Roane	56.1%	9,873	42.5%	7,478	1.4%	261	2,395	17,612
Robertson	52.5%	9,089	45.9%	7,944	1.6%	290	1,145	17,323
Rutherford	48.2%	24,683	50.3%	25,750	1.5%	738	-1,067	51,171
Scott	48.0%	2,326	51.2%	2,480	0.8%	42	-154	4,848
Sequatchie	55.4%	2,020	43.4%	1,582	1.2%	42	438	3,644
Sevier	37.5%	7,642	61.2%	12,477	1.3%	259	-4,835	20,378
Shelby	56.1%	133,084	42.2%	100,261	1.7%	4,048	32,823	237,393
Smith	63.0%	3,741	35.1%	2,086	1.9%	113	1,655	5,940
Stewart	66.6%	2,709	31.0%	1,260	2.4%	97	1,449	4,066
Sullivan	41.8%	17,760	56.7%	24,118	1.5%	637	-6,358	42,515
Sumner	47.8%	19,860	50.7%	21,032	1.5%	626	-1,172	41,518
Tipton	38.6%	5,192	59.5%	8,015	1.9%	253	-2,823	13,460
Trousdale	65.8%	1,515	32.7%	753	1.5%	34	762	2,302
Unicoi	41.2%	1,975	57.1%	2,739	1.7%	81	-764	4,795
Union	49.3%	2,307	49.5%	2,319	1.2%	55	-12	4,681
Van Buren	63.3%	1,178	35.2%	654	1.5%	28	524	1,860
Warren	59.3%	7,137	39.4%	4,743	1.3%	157	2,394	12,037
Washington	40.3%	12,012	58.0%	17,290	1.8%	533	-5,278	29,835
Wayne	40.3%	1,685	58.9%	2,462	0.8%	33	-777	4,180
Weakley	54.4%	5,821	43.7%	4,680	1.9%	205	1,141	10,706
White	49.8%	3,653	48.6%	3,564	1.6%	111	89	7,328
Williamson	41.2%	21,358	57.9%	29,965	0.9%	454	-8,607	51,777
Wilson	48.3%	14,854	50.1%	15,416	1.6%	507	-562	30,777

==== Counties that flipped from Republican to Democratic ====
- Knox (largest city: Knoxville)
- Cocke (largest city: Newport)
- Anderson (largest city: Oak Ridge)
- Carroll (largest city: McKenzie)
- Cheatham (largest city: Ashland City)
- Coffee (largest city: Tullahoma)
- Dyer (largest city: Dyersburg)
- Maury (largest city: Columbia)
- Meigs (largest city: Decatur)
- Montgomery (largest city: Clarksville)
- Morgan (largest city: Coalfield)
- Obion (largest city: Union City)
- Polk (largest city: Benton)
- Putnam (largest city: Cookeville)
- Roane (largest city: Oak Ridge)
- Sequatchie (largest city: Dunlap)
- Bedford (largest city: Shelbyville)
- Campbell (largest city: LaFollette)
- Cannon (largest city: Woodbury)
- Crockett (largest city: Bells)
- Decatur (largest city: Parsons)
- DeKalb (largest city: Smithville)
- Dickson (largest city: Dickson)
- Franklin (largest city: Winchester)
- Gibson (largest city: Humboldt)
- Giles (largest city: Pulaski)
- Henry (largest city: Paris)
- Hickman (largest city: Centerville)
- Lewis (largest city: Hohenwald)
- Marion (largest city: Jasper)
- Marshall (largest city: Lewisburg)
- Robertson (largest city: Springfield)
- Warren (largest city: McMinnville)
- White (largest city: Sparta)
- Benton (largest municipality: Camden)
- Clay (largest municipality: Celina)
- Grundy (largest municipality: Altamont)
- Lauderdale (largest municipality: Ripley)
- Overton (largest municipality: Livingston)
- Perry (largest municipality: Linden)
- Smith (largest municipality: Carthage)
- Stewart (largest municipality: Dover)
- Trousdale (largest municipality: Hartsville)
- Haywood (largest city: Brownsville)
- Shelby (largest city: Memphis)
- Davidson (largest city: Nashville)
- Houston (largest city: Erin)
- Jackson (largest town: Gainesboro)
- Hardeman (largest city: Bolivar)
- Rhea (largest city: Dayton)

== See also ==
- 2002 United States gubernatorial elections
- 2002 United States Senate election in Tennessee
- 2002 Tennessee elections
