= Zach Wamp =

American politician (born 1957)

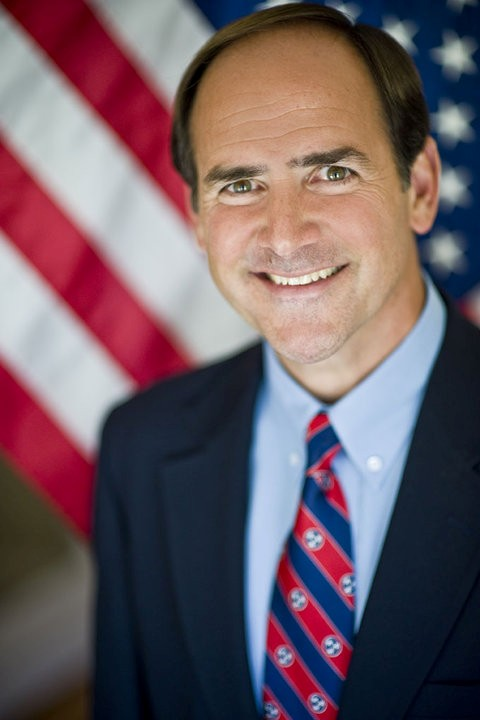

Member of the U.S. House of Representatives from Tennessee's 3rd district
- In office January 3, 1995 – January 3, 2011
- Preceded by: Marilyn Lloyd
- Succeeded by: Chuck Fleischmann

Personal details
- Born: Zachary Paul Wamp; October 28, 1957 (age 68) Fort Benning, Georgia, U.S.
- Party: Republican
- Spouse: Kimberly Wamp
- Children: 2, including Weston
- Education: University of North Carolina, Chapel Hill (attended); University of Tennessee, Knoxville (attended)

Zachary Paul Wamp (born October 28, 1957) is an American politician who was the U.S. representative for Tennessee's 3rd congressional district from 1995 to 2011. He is a member of the Republican Party. The district is based in Chattanooga and includes large parts of East Tennessee, including Oak Ridge.

== Early life and education ==
Wamp was born in Fort Benning, Georgia, and grew up in East Ridge, Tennessee, a community adjacent to Chattanooga, where his father worked as an architect. He attended The Lutheran School, a Lutheran elementary school. Later, with his two brothers, he attended The McCallie School, an all-male prep school in Chattanooga, as a day student, from the age of 11 until he graduated in 1976. He was president of the student council, active in athletics, and was the MVP of the varsity basketball team at McCallie in 1976. He was baptized, raised and confirmed in the Lutheran Church. He spent his freshman year at University of North Carolina at Chapel Hill in 1977–78 and briefly returned in 1979–80 after his sophomore year at the University of Tennessee at Knoxville between (1978–79). However, he graduated from neither and ultimately dropped out of college. He had struggled with drug and alcohol problems as a student and would eventually enter rehab.

== Early career ==
After leaving college, Wamp became a national sales supervisor for Olan Mills, a photography company based in Chattanooga that primarily produces church directories, and later became a successful commercial and industrial real estate broker. He worked in his family's architectural and development business and became vice president of Charter Real Estate Corporation in 1989. In 1992, he joined Fletcher Bright Co. in Chattanooga as a commercial and industrial real estate broker.

He began his career in politics as a precinct vice chairman and Youth Coordinator for the 1983 Chattanooga mayoral campaign of Gene Roberts. He became President of the Young Republicans and was later elected chairman of the Hamilton County, Tennessee Republican Party, then regional director for the Tennessee GOP.

== U.S. House of Representatives ==
=== Elections ===
Wamp ran for the House of Representatives as a Republican in 1992 against nine-term Democrat Marilyn Lloyd. He nearly scored a major upset, only losing by 1.3 points—only 2,900 votes out of 210,000 total votes cast.

When Lloyd did not run for re-election in 1994, Wamp ran again. Battling through a hotly contested primary, he easily defeated his childhood friend and sitting State Representative Kenneth J. Meyer by nearly two to one. During the race, Wamp signed the Contract with America. He also personally committed to serve no more than six terms and further committed to not accept special interest PAC money. He proposed a plan to pay congressmen the same as Lieutenant Colonels and linked his Democratic opponent, Randy Button, to Bill Clinton. Wamp won the general election with 52% of the vote. He was re-elected with slightly less difficulty in 1996. After his first two elections, he never faced another close contest; from 1998 onward, he won by 64 percent or more of the vote. Wamp explored seeking a seat in the United States Senate to succeed Bill Frist, who had promised to serve no more than two terms. He decided against running for that seat in October 2004.

2006

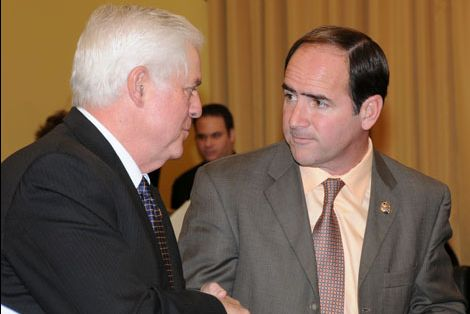
Wamp with U.S. Representative Lincoln Davis

When he was elected to the House in 1994, Wamp pledged to serve just twelve years (six terms) in the House. However, shortly after winning reelection to a sixth term in 2004, Wamp announced he would run again in 2006 after all, citing his status as Tennessee's only member of the powerful Appropriations Committee. The pledge was "a mistake," he told the Associated Press in 2004.

Wamp faced Brent Benedict, a computer programmer and consultant. During the campaign, Benedict made an issue of Wamp breaking his term limit pledge, saying that he would hold himself to six terms if elected. Despite this, Wamp was easily reelected.

Following the GOP losing the U.S. House and U.S. Senate in the 2006 midterm elections, Wamp reflected on the defeat saying, "For the first six years of the 12 years, we were focused on policy and principles, and politics was secondary. The second six years, politics became primary: raising money, going negative, consolidating power."

2008

He won re-election with 69% of the vote, his best election performance.

=== Tenure ===
Wamp was a member of the powerful House Appropriations Committee, a post he has used to champion what he called his highest legislative priority—funding for his district's decaying lock at the Chickamauga Dam. In 2006, the eight-year, $349 million project was approved, but Wamp has had to continually work to protect the project from budget cuts and shortfalls. Indeed, he cited his status as the only Tennessean on that committee as a reason for dropping his original term-limit pledge. He also secured in the 2006 budget a $4 million appropriation for a methamphetamine task force, which was started in 1999 and has since expanded to all regions of Tennessee. Wamp has vigorously supported the Tennessee Valley Authority, one of the largest government-owned firms in the United States.

Wamp supported legislation to allow the posting of the Ten Commandments in public buildings. He changed his vote from "nay" to "yea" on the bill of the Wall Street bailout, but later has said he regrets that vote. In 2003, he was one of two congressmen to have received a 100 percent rating from the American Conservative Union.

2005 run for Majority Whip

In the wake of Tom DeLay's indictment in September 2005, Wamp campaigned among his fellow Republican House members to become the majority whip, the number three position in the Republican House leadership. Representatives Ray LaHood and Gil Gutknecht agreed to co-chair his campaign for the position. However, the incumbent, Roy Blunt, remained the majority whip because Blunt lost his race for Majority Leader (the position was won by John Boehner in February 2006).

=== Committee assignments ===
- Committee on Appropriations
  - Subcommittee on Energy and Water Development
  - Subcommittee on Military Construction, Veterans Affairs, and Related Agencies (Ranking Member)

Wamp served on the Liberty Caucus (sometimes called the Liberty Committee), a Republican group that focuses on reducing the size of the US Government. Congressman Ron Paul hosts a luncheon for the Liberty Caucus every Thursday.

== 2010 gubernatorial election ==
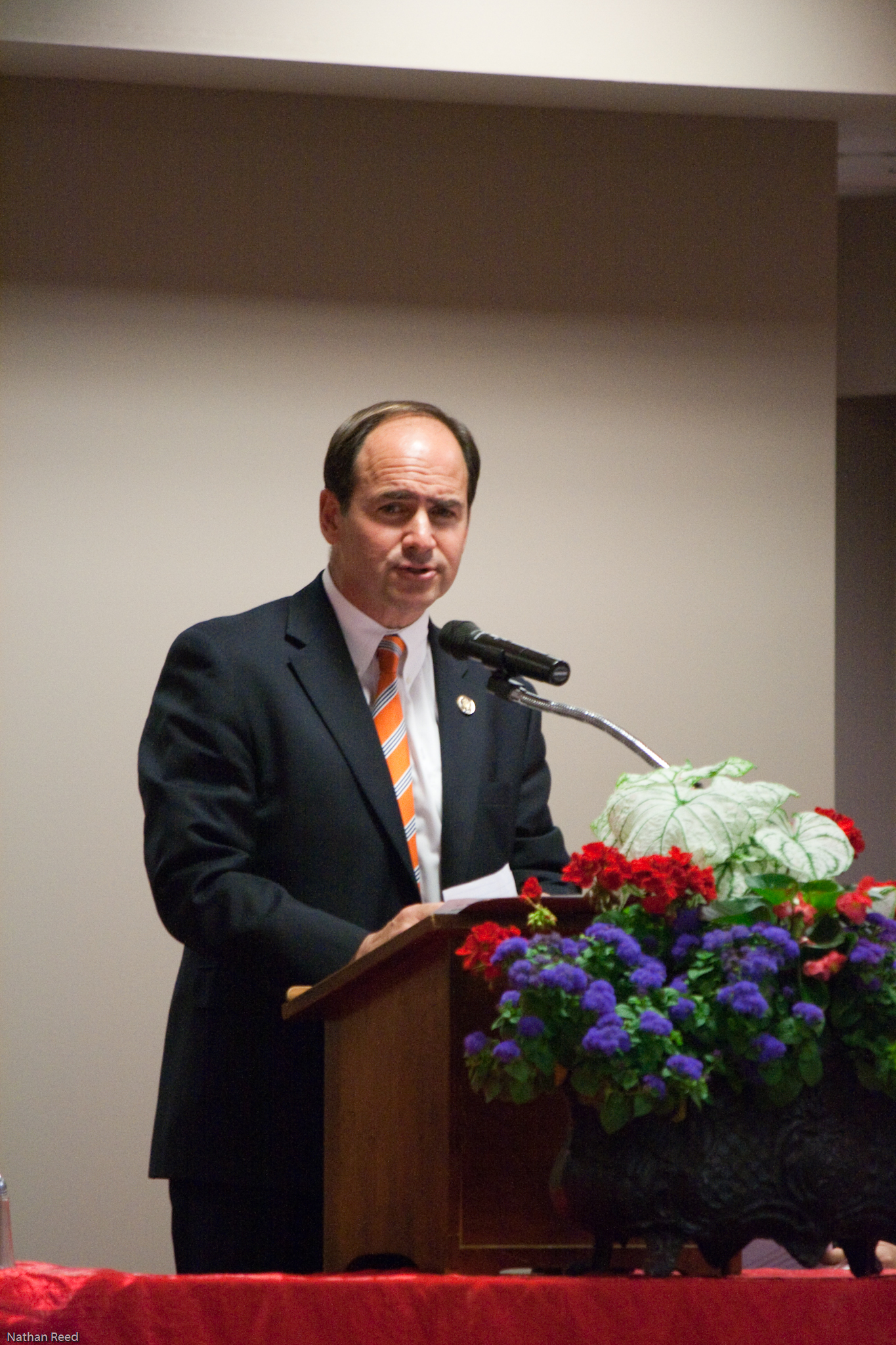
Wamp speaking during his campaign, at the 2010 Tennessee Governor's Luncheon

On January 5, 2009, Wamp announced that he would run for Governor of Tennessee in the Republican primaries. In the primary, he placed second with 29% of the vote.

On July 23, 2010, Hotline OnCall published statements made by Wamp in an interview, in which he said that the health care reforms proposed during the Obama administration had placed state governments in "an untenable position". Wamp also suggested the possibility of secession arising from opposition to the federal government, stating "I hope that the American people will go to the ballot box in 2010 and 2012 so that states are not forced to consider separation from this government", as well as expressing support for Texas Governor Rick Perry's similar statements regarding secession. Wamp's statements drew national attention, prompting Wamp to state that his remarks were misinterpreted, and that he did not support secession. Opponent Ron Ramsey labeled the remarks Wamp's "over-the-top temperament and overheated, sometimes crazy rhetoric".

Wamp was unsuccessful in his bid to be the Republican candidate for Tennessee's Governor, losing to Bill Haslam in the August 5, 2010 open primary.

== After Congress ==
After leaving office, he launched a consulting firm Zach Wamp Consulting/Business Development representing mostly energy and security related firms. He also joined with two others to start a STEM awareness, Computer Science and Coding platform called Learning Blade which went national and sold to E-Dynamic Learning and ultimately to Pearson. He also became involved in political reform efforts, including joining nine other former members of Congress to co-author a 2021 opinion editorial advocating reforms of Congress. As a volunteer, he chaired the planning team for the National Prayer Breakfast from 2016-2023 and as Chairman of the Gospel Music Foundation he led the Capital raise and development of the Museum of Christian & Gospel Music in downtown Nashville which opened on October 3, 2025.

== Electoral history ==
Tennessee's 3rd congressional district: Results 1992–2006
Year	Republican	Votes	Pct	Democratic	Votes	Pct	3rd Party	Party	Votes	Pct	3rd Party	Party	Votes	Pct	
1992	Zach Wamp	102,763	47%	Marilyn Lloyd	105,693	49%	Carol Hagan	Independent	4,433	2%	Pete Melcher	Independent	2,048	1%	*
1994	Zach Wamp	84,583	52%	Randy Button	73,839	46%	Thomas Morrell	Independent	1,929	1%	Richard M. Sims	Independent	1,498	1%	*
1996	Zach Wamp	113,408	56%	Charles N. Jolly	85,714	43%	William A. Cole	Independent	1,002	<1%	Walt Ward	Independent	718	<1%	*
1998	Zach Wamp	75,100	66%	James M. Lewis	37,144	33%	Richard M. Sims	Independent	1,468	1%					*
2000	Zach Wamp	139,840	64%	William Callaway	75,785	35%	Trudy Austin	Libertarian	3,235	1%					*
2002	Zach Wamp	112,254	65%	John Wolfe	58,824	34%	William Bolen	Independent	1,743	1%	Timothy A. Sevier	Independent	947	1%	*
2004	Zach Wamp	166,154	65%	John Wolfe	84,295	33%	June Griffin	Independent	3,018	1%	Doug Vandagriff	Independent	1,696	1%	*
2006	Zach Wamp	130,791	66%	Brent Benedict	68,324	34%									*
2008	Zach Wamp	184,787	69%	Doug Vandagriff	73,030	27%	Jean Howard-Hill	Independent	4,846	2%	Ed Choate	Independent	3,749	1%	*

*Write-in and minor candidate notes: In 1992, Marjorie M. Martin received 1,593 votes (1%) and write-ins received 3 votes. In 1994, write-ins received 4 votes. In 1996, Thomas Ed Morrell received 304 votes; Richard M. "Dick" Sims received 294 votes; and write-ins received 4 votes. In 1998, write-ins received 74 votes. In 2000, write-ins received 80 votes. In 2002, write-ins received 153 votes. In 2004, Jean Howard-Hill received 1,473 votes (1%).

== Personal life ==
Zach and his wife, Kim, have two children and six grandchildren. His son Weston currently serves as the mayor of Hamilton County, Tennessee. His daughter Coty Wamp currently serves as the District Attorney General.

U.S. House of Representatives
Preceded by Marilyn Lloyd	Member of the U.S. House of Representatives from Tennessee's 3rd congressional district 1995–2011	Succeeded by Chuck Fleischmann
U.S. order of precedence (ceremonial)
Preceded by John Yarmuth as Former U.S. Representative	Order of precedence of the United States as Former U.S. Representative	Succeeded by Deborah Pryce as Former U.S. Representative
