= Van Hilleary =

American politician (born 1959)

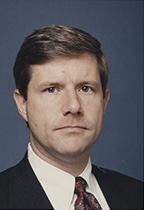

Member of the U.S. House of Representatives from Tennessee's 4th district
- In office January 3, 1995 – January 3, 2003
- Preceded by: Jim Cooper
- Succeeded by: Lincoln Davis

Personal details
- Born: William Vanderpool Hilleary; June 20, 1959 (age 67) Dayton, Tennessee, U.S.
- Party: Republican
- Spouse: Meredith Hilleary
- Children: 4
- Education: University of Tennessee (BA); Samford University (JD)

Military service
- Branch/service: United States Air Force
- Years of service: 1982–1984 (active); 1984–1995 (reserve)
- Unit: United States Air Force Reserve
- Battles/wars: Gulf War

William Vanderpool "Van" Hilleary (born June 20, 1959) is an American politician who served as the U.S. representative for Tennessee's 4th congressional district from 1995 to 2003. He is a member of the Republican Party. He is running for congress in 2026 for Tennessee's 6th congressional district to succeed U.S. Representative John Rose.

Hilleary ran for Governor of Tennessee in 2002, narrowly losing to Democratic nominee Phil Bredesen.

== Early life and career ==
Hilleary was born in Dayton, Tennessee, the seat of Rhea County, and raised in nearby Spring City, where his family operated a textile manufacturing concern. He graduated from the University of Tennessee in 1981 where he was a member of the Sigma Chi Fraternity. He participated in the Air Force ROTC program at the University of Tennessee and served on active duty from 1982 to 1984 and has been a member of the Air Force Reserve since that time. Hilleary graduated from the Cumberland School of Law of Samford University in Birmingham, Alabama in 1990. He served two volunteer tours of duty during Operation Desert Shield and Operation Desert Storm. While in the Gulf War, Hilleary flew 24 missions as a navigator on C-130 aircraft.

== U.S. House of Representatives ==
=== Campaigns ===
Following his return from the Middle East, he entered a race for the Tennessee State Senate in 1992. His opponent was Anna Belle Clement O'Brien, younger sister and political confidante of the late former governor of Tennessee Frank G. Clement. While Hilleary was defeated, he ran such a competitive race that he was recruited to enter the Republican primary in 1994 for the Fourth Congressional District. This seat was open as incumbent six-term Democrat Jim Cooper retired to run for the United States Senate. Hilleary easily won the Republican primary and faced Democratic nominee Jeff Whorley, a former aide to Cooper, in the general election. It was the first serious bid the Republicans had made for the district since its creation after the 1980 census. Hilleary won by a 14-point margin. Even considering the massive Republican tide that swept through the state that year, Hilleary's convincing win came as something of a surprise.

On paper, the 4th District was not regarded as safe for either party. It stretched from the Virginia border in East Tennessee to the Mississippi border in Middle Tennessee. Prior to Cooper's election in 1982, much of the district's eastern portion had not been represented by a Democrat since before the Civil War. However, its configuration made it very difficult to unseat an incumbent in a normal election year. Then, as now, the district covers five television markets (the Tri-Cities, Knoxville, Chattanooga, Nashville and Huntsville, Alabama) and two time zones. Frequently, advertising budgets in the 4th rival those for statewide races. Continuing this pattern, Hilleary was reelected three times from this district without much difficulty, and actually increased his margin each time; his 56 percent in 1994 would be the lowest margin of his congressional career. He even won easily in 1996 even as Bill Clinton carried the district in the presidential election mainly on the strength of Al Gore's presence on the ticket; Gore had represented much of the western portion of the district in Congress from 1977 to 1983.

=== Tenure ===
Hilleary had a conservative voting record. For instance, Hilleary was opposed to any form of a state income tax, which was a major issue in the state legislature at the time. In each of his three subsequent Congressional races, Hilleary won with an increasing margin. Due to the 4th's configuration, Hilleary also became known over a large portion of the state.

== 2002 Tennessee gubernatorial election ==
Hilleary was considered a logical choice for the Republican gubernatorial nomination in 2002, withstanding a challenge from the party's moderate wing made by Jim Henry, former minority leader in the Tennessee House of Representatives and former mayor of Kingston. Henry's race was largely supported and financed by members of the inner circle of unpopular outgoing GOP governor Don Sundquist, a fact resented by many grassroots activists, and Hilleary defeated him by a wide margin.

Hilleary's opponent in the general election was Phil Bredesen, a multimillionaire former mayor of Nashville. Bredesen had run for governor in 1994 and lost to Sundquist. At first, Bredesen agreed to be bound by a relatively new Tennessee state law limiting the amount of money one could contribute to one's own campaign for elective office. However, the state attorney general subsequently issued an opinion that such a law was unconstitutional and hence unenforceable, as the United States Supreme Court had previously ruled a similar federal law with regard to federal campaigns. This freed Bredesen to use his considerable wealth to self-finance his campaign. Faced with huge and potentially overwhelming resources against him, Hilleary reversed his previous position on PACs and began to actively solicit donations from them.

One of the major issues of the race was TennCare, the huge state-supported managed care program that had supplanted Medicaid in Tennessee. Hilleary displayed a high level of knowledge about this issue in a debate between the two, despite the fact that Bredesen had made most of his fortune as a managed health care executive. However, polling seemed to indicate that one of the major factors with public support of Bredesen was his knowledge of this issue. Bredesen was also a moderate Democrat; Republican charges against "ultra-liberal Democrats" could not be made to stick to him with any real degree of success. Another problem for Hilleary was that Bredesen showed himself able to raise support in East Tennessee (Hilleary's home region) far more readily than could previous Democratic candidates, especially considering that Bredesen was from Nashville. In addition, questions were raised regarding Hilleary's performance as a member of the House Budget Committee.

Hilleary nonetheless received over 48% of the vote. Bredesen defeated him largely by doing far better than expected in heavily Republican East Tennessee, an area where Democrats are not normally competitive except in statewide landslides. For instance, Bredesen carried Knox County, the largest county in East Tennessee, by a few hundred votes; in contrast, George W. Bush won Knox County two years later by over 40,000 votes.

== 2006 Senate campaign ==
Hilleary was a candidate for the United States Senate seat then held by Senate Majority Leader Bill Frist, who did not run for re-election, fulfilling his promise not to serve more than two terms when first elected in 1994.

Despite over 80% name recognition, Hilleary placed a distant third with a mere 17% of the vote in the primary, behind fellow former Congressman Ed Bryant, who received 34% and the winner, former Chattanooga mayor Bob Corker, who won with a 48% plurality. Surprisingly, Hilleary lost 13 of the 22 counties in his old district. Hilleary endorsed Corker for the general election.

== Consultant ==
Shortly after the November 2004 election, Hilleary moved his family to Murfreesboro, just outside Nashville. He now lives there primarily on weekends and through the week was employed as a consultant in Washington, D.C. until December 2018.

According to a disclosure of personal finances from 2004 and part of 2005, as required by his 2006 Senate candidacy, Hilleary made $300,000 in salary in 2004 from Washington lobbying firm Sonnenschein Nath & Rosenthal, and more than $150,000 in salary from the firm through August 12, 2005.

One of his clients was the Lumbee Indian Tribe of North Carolina, which was seeking federal status from Congress and $77 million in funding for education, health care and economic development that would come with recognition. The tribe was recognized in 1956, but was not awarded the same monetary benefits given to other American Indian groups. Another client was Pennsylvania House Speaker John M. Perzel. Other clients listed by Hilleary included the American Academy of Ophthalmology, the American Association of Diabetes Educators, the American Association of State Highway and Transportation Officials, Balfour Ventures, Federal-Mogul Corporation, L-3 Communications, SMS Holdings Corp. and VPI Technologies.

== Later congressional staff work ==
On December 11, 2018, it was announced that Hilleary would be returning to Congress as the Chief of Staff for John Rose, Representative-elect for Tennessee's 6th congressional district, which contains much of the territory that he had once represented.

== 2026 Congressional campaign ==
Hilleary announced on July 11, 2025 that he would be running for the 6th congressional district currently held by Rose, who himself is running for governor.

== Electoral history ==
Tennessee's 4th congressional district: Results 1994–2000
Year	Democrat	Votes	Pct	Republican	Votes	Pct	3rd Party	Party	Votes	Pct	
1994	Jeff Whorley	60,489	42%	Van Hilleary	81,539	57%	J. Patrick Lyons	Independent	1,944	1%	*
1996	Mark Stewart	73,331	41%	Van Hilleary	103,091	58%	J. Patrick Lyons	Independent	1,075	1%	*
1998	Jerry W. Cooper	42,627	40%	Van Hilleary	62,829	60%					*
2000	David H. Dunaway	67,165	33%	Van Hilleary	133,622	66%	J. Patrick Lyons	Independent	2,418	1%	*

*Write-in and minor candidate notes: In 1994, write-ins received 4 votes. In 1996, Preston T. Spaulding received 561 votes and write-ins received 5 votes. In 1998, write-ins received 23 votes. In 2000, write-ins received 5 votes.

U.S. House of Representatives
Preceded by Jim Cooper	Member of the U.S. House of Representatives from Tennessee's 4th congressional district 1995–2003	Succeeded by Lincoln Davis
Party political offices
Preceded by Don Sundquist	Republican nominee for Governor of Tennessee; 2002	Succeeded by Jim Bryson
U.S. order of precedence (ceremonial)
Preceded by Ed Bryant as Former U.S. Representative	Order of precedence of the United States as Former U.S. Representative	Succeeded by Lincoln Davis as Former U.S. Representative
