= John Tanner (Tennessee politician) =

American politician (born 1944)

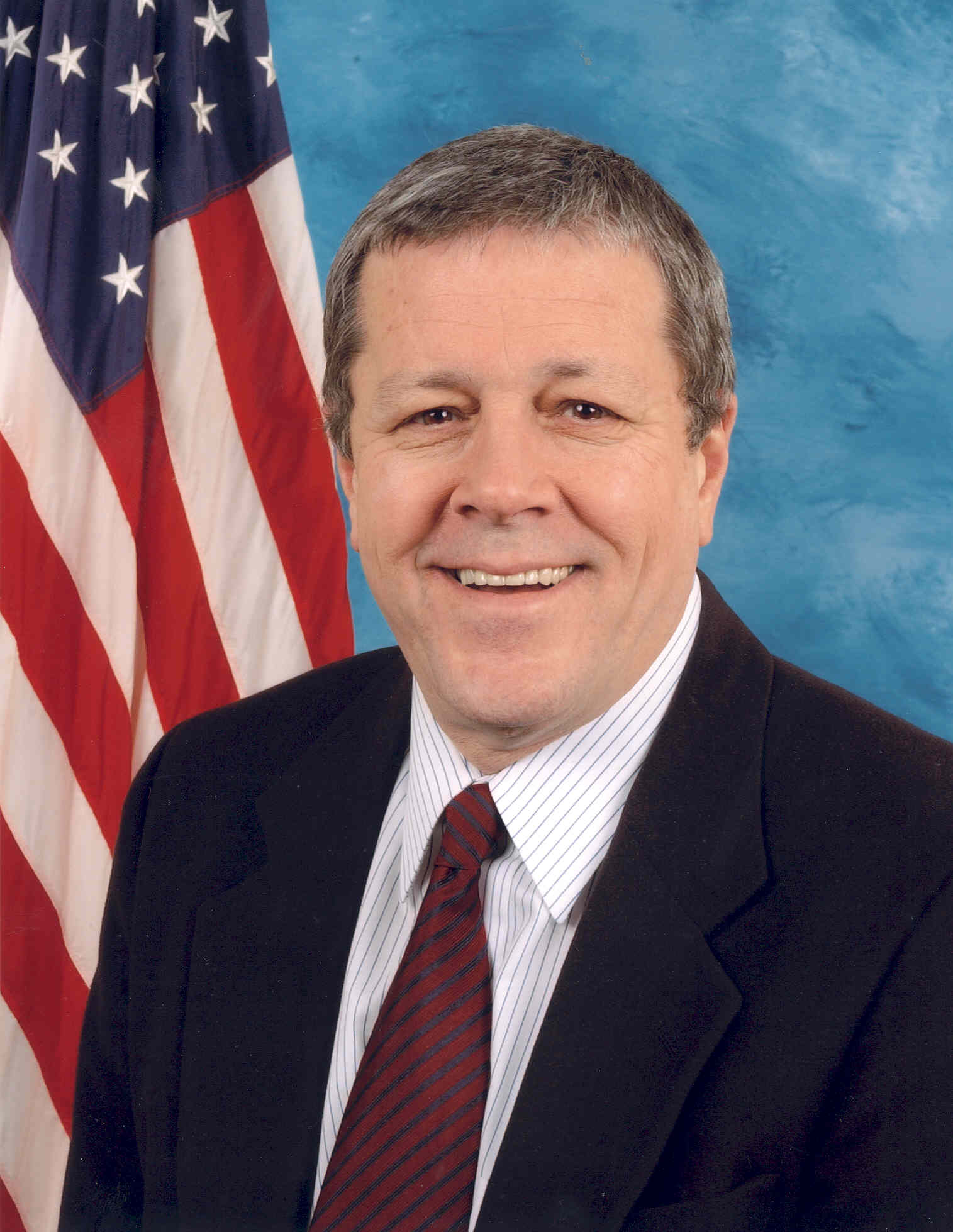

President of the NATO Parliamentary Assembly
- In office November 18, 2008 – November 16, 2010
- Preceded by: José Lello
- Succeeded by: Karl A. Lamers

Member of the U.S. House of Representatives from Tennessee's 8th district
- In office January 3, 1989 – January 3, 2011
- Preceded by: Ed Jones
- Succeeded by: Stephen Fincher

Member of the Tennessee House of Representatives from the 77th district
- In office January 4, 1977 – January 13, 1987
- Preceded by: Larry Bates
- Succeeded by: Phillip Pinion

Personal details
- Born: John Sumners Tanner; September 22, 1944 (age 82) Halls, Tennessee, U.S.
- Party: Democratic
- Spouse: Betty Ann Tanner
- Children: 2
- Education: University of Tennessee, Knoxville (BS, JD)

Military service
- Branch/service: United States Navy; United States Army
- Years of service: 1968–1972 (active); 1974–2000 (reserve)
- Rank: Colonel
- Unit: Army National Guard

John Sumners Tanner (born September 22, 1944) is a former American politician who served as the U.S. representative for Tennessee's 8th congressional district, serving from 1989 until 2011. He is a member of the Democratic Party. Since his retirement, Tanner has served as the Vice Chairman of Prime Policy Group.

== Early life, education, and early political career ==
Tanner was born in Halls, Tennessee, the son of Edith Adell (Sumners) and Emerson Beck "Buzz" Tanner. He grew up in Union City, Tennessee. Following graduation from the University of Tennessee, he served in the United States Navy from 1968 to 1972. He was elected to the Tennessee House of Representatives as a Democrat in 1976, replacing Larry Bates, who mounted an unsuccessful primary challenge against U.S. Congressman Ed Jones.

Tanner received much of his knowledge of politics as a youth from his father E.B. "Buzz" Tanner who was successful in the financial and insurance business. He became a member of a highly political and influential law firm out of law school in his home town community and soon ran for office as a state legislator in the House of Representatives. He was also a relative of then House Speaker Ned McWherter, who later was elected governor twice and was an extremely powerful political force in the state, having friends on both sides of the political aisle.

== U.S. House of Representatives ==
=== Elections ===
When Jones retired in 1988, Tanner won the Democratic nomination for the seat and handily defeated Republican nominee Ed Bryant, who went on to represent the neighboring 7th district from 1995 to 2003. Tanner was reelected in 1990 with no major-party opposition, a feat he repeated in 1992. In 1998, he was completely unopposed. He handily defeated Republican opponents in 1994 (the only time besides his initial election that he faced a serious or well-funded challenger), 1996, 2000, 2002, 2004 and 2006. In 2004 and 2008, he faced James L. Hart, an avowed eugenicist. On both occasions, Hart was disavowed by the state Republican Party.

Tanner announced on December 1, 2009, that he would not seek re-election in 2010 and would retire after 11 terms in Congress. State Senator Roy Herron gave up his gubernatorial bid and ran for Tanner's congressional seat. However, he only tallied 39.8 percent of the vote against Republican farmer Stephen Fincher. Indeed, no Democrat running in the district has cracked the 40 percent mark since Tanner left office.

=== Tenure ===
As a Congressman, Tanner sponsored a bill to repeal the inheritance tax (which was vetoed by President Clinton) and he is in favor of a balanced budget. It is reported that Tanner could have been appointed to the United States Senate by governor of Tennessee Ned McWherter in 1992 to replace Al Gore but he declined the offer, and Harlan Mathews was appointed as a caretaker instead. Tanner was a founder of the Blue Dog Democrats and denied rumors that he might switch parties, and earned a reputation as a moderate. Tanner gained notoriety during the Clinton–Lewinsky scandal when it was revealed in the Starr Report that Clinton was receiving fellatio from Monica Lewinsky while on the phone with Tanner on November 15, 1995, between 9:31pm and 9:35pm.

Tanner favored balancing the federal budget and paying down the national debt. He was a strong opponent of the fiscal policies of President George W. Bush, voting against many of the tax cuts passed during his terms; yet, he was one of 43 Democrats to vote to repeal the estate tax in 2006. Tanner was one of the few Democrats in the House to vote in favor of CAFTA and has long distanced himself from the majority of his party on issues such as bankruptcy law and lawsuit reform.

He voted for the Federal Marriage Amendment, the ban on "partial-birth" abortions, limiting death penalty appeals, and voted against most gun control measures. On other issues he had a more liberal voting record. He often voted with his party on separation of church and states issues, and consistently voted against the Flag Desecration Amendment. Tanner voted with the majority of his party to expand stem cell research and against renewing the controversial portions of the Patriot Act. He also supported affirmative action and public education. Tanner was firmly opposed to Bush's attempt to reform Social Security.

In 2004, Congressman Tanner made a brief but unintended cameo appearance alongside Michael Moore in Fahrenheit 9/11, where Moore was trying to get Congressmen to have their children enlist in the Military to go to Iraq.

He drafted a bill that would have required special bipartisan commissions rather than state legislatures to redraw congressional districts when necessary due to U.S. Census count changes. It was generally believed that this bill was a response to Republican-inspired mid-decade redistricting in Texas and recent similar efforts in Colorado and Georgia.

After both his district and state chose the former first lady, Congressman Tanner endorsed Senator Hillary Clinton's presidential campaign in April 2008.

=== Committee assignments ===
- Committee on Foreign Affairs
  - Subcommittee on Europe
  - Subcommittee on the Western Hemisphere
- Committee on Ways and Means
  - Subcommittee on Trade (chair)
  - Subcommittee on Social Security

== Post-congressional career ==
He currently works for Nashville law firm Miller & Martin and the Prime Policy Group, a lobbying firm. He became chairman of the International Conservation Caucus Foundation, a non-profit group that advocates U.S. leadership in conservation programs globally, in fall of 2011.

Tanner is a member of the ReFormers Caucus of Issue One. He also serves on the board of directors of the Committee for a Responsible Federal Budget.

== Personal life ==
He is married to Betty Ann Tanner and has two children.

U.S. House of Representatives
Preceded by Ed Jones	Member of the U.S. House of Representatives from Tennessee's 8th congressional district 1989–2011	Succeeded by Stephen Fincher
Party political offices
New office	Chair of the Blue Dog Coalition for Communications; 1995–1999; Served alongside: Gary Condit (Administration), Nathan Deal, Collin Peterson (Policy)	Succeeded by Chris John
Diplomatic posts
Preceded by José Lello	President of the NATO Parliamentary Assembly; 2008–2010	Succeeded by Karl A. Lamers
U.S. order of precedence (ceremonial)
Preceded by Harold Ford Sr. as Former U.S. Representative	Order of precedence of the United States as Former U.S. Representative	Succeeded by Tony P. Hall as Former U.S. Representative
