= Ohio Governor's Mansion =

Historic house in Ohio, United States

- Malcolm Jeffrey House
- U.S. National Register of Historic Places
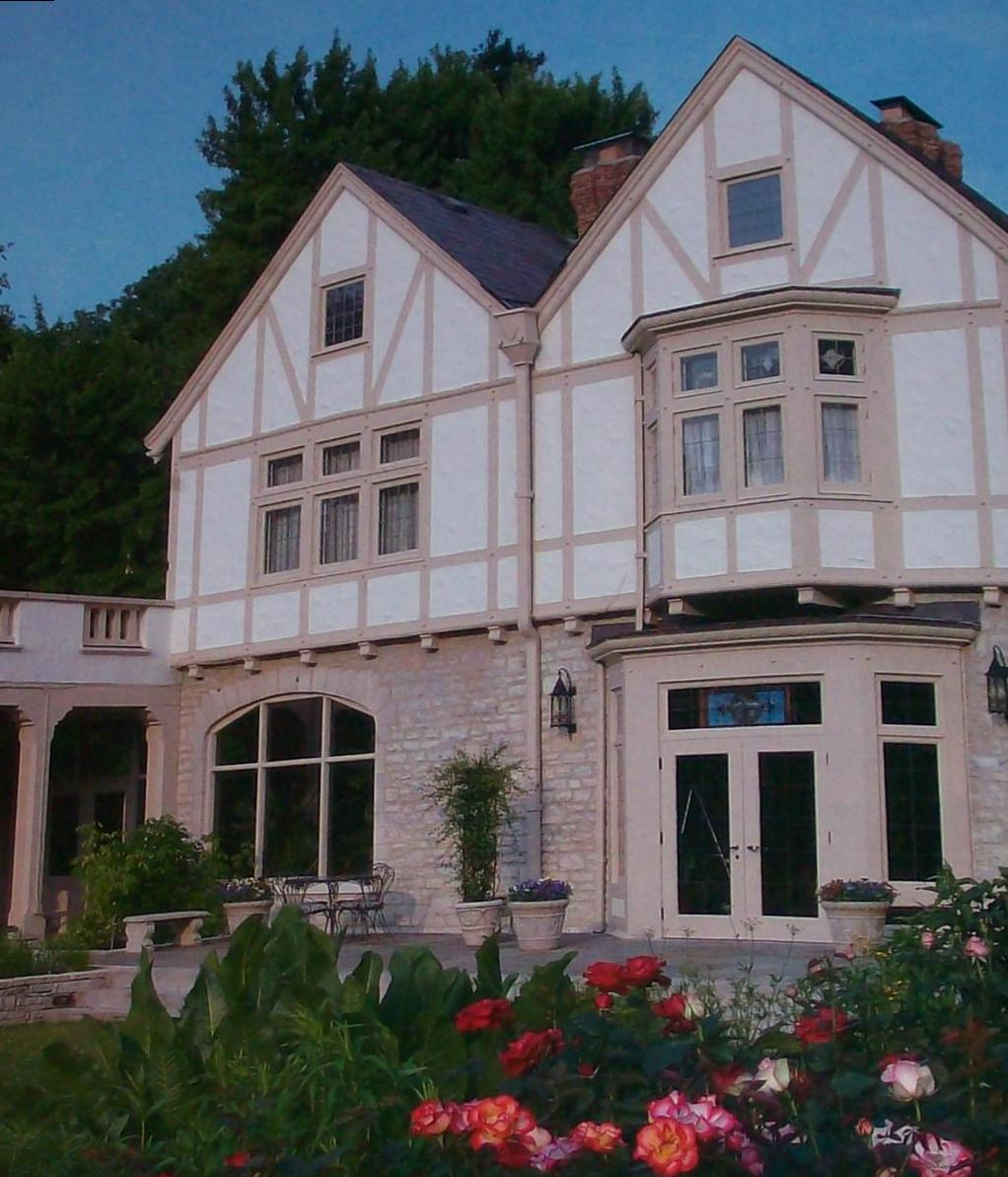
- Interactive map highlighting the house's location
- Location: 358 N. Parkview, Bexley, Ohio
- Coordinates: 39°58′35″N 82°56′25″W
- Built: 1925
- Architect: Robert Gilmore Hanford
- Architectural style: Tudor Revival; Jacobethan Revival
- NRHP reference No.: 83001970
- Added to NRHP: May 6, 1983

The Ohio Governor's Residence and Heritage Garden is the official residence of the governor of Ohio. The residence was built during 1923–1925 by industrialist Malcolm D. Jeffrey and has served as the official home of the governor since 1957. The mansion is located at 358 North Parkview Avenue in Bexley, a suburb and enclave of the state capital, Columbus. It is one of only four official state governor's residences in the country that is not located within its state's capital (the others being Drumthwacket, located in Princeton, New Jersey, instead of Trenton; the Wisconsin Governor's Mansion, located in Maple Bluff, instead of Madison; and the Tennessee Governor's Mansion, located in Oak Hill instead of Nashville, Tennessee).

== History ==
The current mansion that houses the governor is the second governor's mansion and was purchased in 1957 to house the governor and his or her family. The original residence, the Old Governor's Mansion in Columbus, was purchased after an embarrassing incident in 1916 occurred with the governor-elect James M. Cox. Governors were expected to find their own housing and Mr. Cox was expecting to move into a house after his recent election. Unfortunately, this house was rented to the newly elected Secretary of State, William D. Fulton. In an effort to avoid such incidents, House Bill 559 was passed to secure a residence for the governor during his tenure.

The first house was purchased in 1919 and had been built in 1905 for Charles H. Lindenberg, a local business owner and a founder of M.C. Lilley and Company. The house served as the official residence of the Ohio Governor until the late 1950s after the house became dilapidated and needed extensive repairs and renovations. When it was discovered these repairs were not covered in the budget, the state found it would be cheaper to find a new residence altogether.

The residence in Bexley, Ohio was commissioned by Malcolm Jeffrey, the son of J. A. Jeffrey, founder of Jeffrey Manufacturing Company. It was designed by Robert Gilmore Hanford, a Columbus-based architect. Ground was broken for the house in 1923 and it was completed in 1925. The Jeffreys occupied the home until Malcolm Jeffrey's death in 1930. It was then sold to Florence Jeffrey Carlile, Malcolm Jeffrey's sister. Under Mrs. Carlile's ownership the house gained a master suite on the second floor as well as a screened porch. Upon Mrs. Carlile's death in 1954, the house was turned over to the Very Reverend Charles U. Harris, who in turn offered the residence to the state. The house has been occupied by Ohio's governors ever since, except for 1975–1983, the third and fourth terms of Governor James A. Rhodes. (He had lived in the house during his first two terms, from 1963 to 1971, but then acquired a Columbus residence of his own and remained there after his return to the governorship.) Governor John Kasich owned a private residence in the Columbus suburb of Westerville and did not live in the Governor's Mansion during his two terms (2011-2019). Kasich did use the mansion for meetings, receptions and special events.

Current Governor, Mike DeWine, and his wife, Fran, moved into the home in January 2019. On weekends, the DeWines return to their family farm, the Whitelaw Reid House, in Cedarville, Ohio.

== Exterior ==
The residence is framed by Parkview Avenue to the west, Maryland Avenue to the north, and Columbia Avenue to the east. The house is surrounded on all sides by the Heritage Garden; to the northeast is the Carriage House, Gift Shop & Guest Services, and Greenhouse. Directly in front of the main entrance is the Heritage Fountain.

=== Heritage Garden ===
When the Governor's Residence was relocated to its current location the grounds were occupied by some plants and trees. Over time several works of art, perimeter fencing and low garden walls were installed and resulted in the development of the current gardens. The Heritage Garden was developed and planted in 2001, under the guidance of First Lady Hope Taft. The purpose of the garden is to depict the diverse geological areas of Ohio. The new gardens and recent additions such as the solar panels and porous driveway have led to recognition as the grounds being the greenest governor's residence in America.

As one starts from the Carriage House and passes by the northern gates, the Geologic Walk is presented. This walk circles the entire residence and begins the tour of the geological regions of Ohio. The Allegheny Garden extends along the length of the property wall from the entry gates on Maryland Avenue to the entry gate on Parkview Avenue. This garden depicts the northeastern area of Ohio. Several trees and plants present in this garden are not from the Allegheny region but have remained due to being part of the original landscape. At the end of this garden is a 16-ton boulder carried by a glacier from Canada to Ohio during the Ice Age.

The rest of the west lawn consists of the Governor's Grove and celebrates the residents of the home. Each governor has planted a tree in this area, such as the Honey locust planted by C. William O'Neill, the Higan cherry planted by John J. Gilligan, and the six Redbuds planted by Dick Celeste, in honor of his six children. A Kentucky coffeetree was given to the residence as a gift from Governor Ernie Fletcher of Kentucky.

Extending from the entrance to the residence is the Arrival Plaza, a starting point for anyone touring the premises, which then forms the First Lady's Courtyard. The Heritage Fountain is a centerpiece to the courtyard. Symmetrical plantings surround the courtyard and two flagpoles flying the national and state flag frame the western end of the courtyard.

The Meadow Garden and the Woodland Garden frame the southern border of the property. The County Walk, a collection of stones bearing the names of each county, leads from the drive to the gardens and past the Taxus Hedge into the Dogwood Glade. A large brick depiction of the Great Seal of Ohio sits to the south of the glade and is a gift from Licking County during the George Voinovich administration.

Past the state seal are the Sister State Cherry Trees given to Ohio from the Saitama Prefecture in Japan. These trees frame the First Family Patio. Standing to the south of the patio is a clone of a Tidal Basin Yoshino cherry tree in the District of Columbia. The tree was formally donated by the United States National Arboretum.

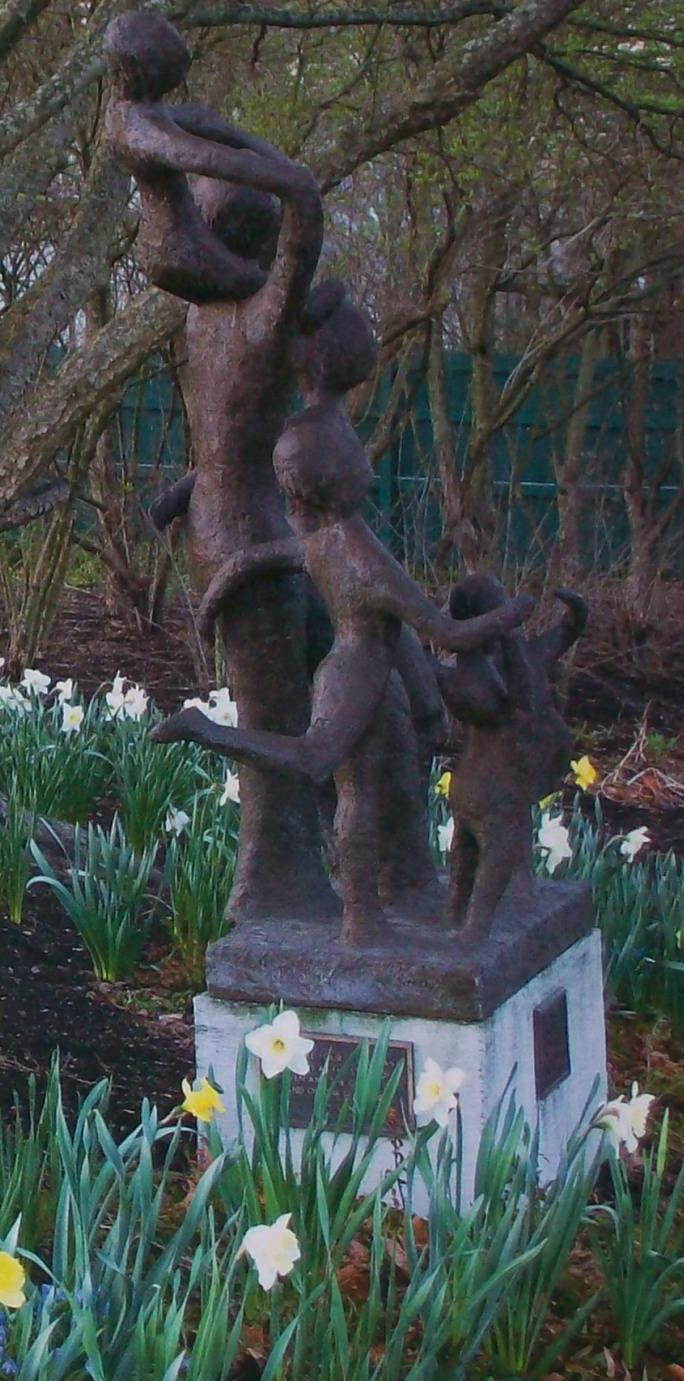
Alfred Tibor's sculpture To Life

The Water Garden sits to the north of the patio and consists of 6 pools with 2 large urns in the corners to recirculate the water. The water garden features a diverse collection of aquatic plants. The Black Swamp Garden is located to the east of the patio, and above this is a crab apple grove with the sculpture named To Life. This sculpture by Alfred Tibor depicts a father with a child on his shoulders, a mother, and two children playing around them.

The Headlands Sand Dune Garden, representing the Lake Erie shoreline, is located to the east of the apple grove, with the Oak Openings Sand Dune, representing the landscape to the west of Toledo, framing the path on the other side. These gardens represent an area of Ohio made when glaciers deposited a yellow-brown sand from the bed of Lake Erie. When the glaciers retreated and the lake levels dropped, the sand was left and formed hills and ridges making its own unique habitat. Some notable plants in this garden are the blue sundial lupine and the prickly pear cactus. The old willow tree standing in the garden dates back to when the house was built and provides some shade to the garden.

The Alvar Rock Garden & Fen contains two somewhat circular flower beds with large bare slabs of dolomite and limestone. The larger “island” contains slabs with glacial striations and planting of hardy plants such as the Lakeside Daisy. The smaller “island” contains a slab containing numerous fossils and is surrounded by the same plant varieties found in the larger bed.

The Appalachian Garden frames the southeastern corner of the gardens and represents the Appalachian Plateau. The garden consists of raised beds with outcropping of rocks. These resemble the rocky “hanging gardens” in which plants creep out and hang over the edges of cliff sides and outcrops of the area. These hanging gardens feature large stones from the washed out covered bridge near Zanesville and large Peebles dolomite from Adams County.

The Pioneer Garden is located in the center of the eastern garden. The focal point is a cutting-grown apple tree of one of the few living trees planted by Johnny "Appleseed" Chapman. Surrounding this area are plants with major significant roles in the lives of the early pioneers of Ohio.

The Earth's Harvest Agricultural Garden is directly in front of the greenhouse. The garden was planted originally by Governor Celeste and was expanded to its current size. The many raised beds allow a great variety of plants to grow, as well as room for rows of fruit trees, berry plants, and grapevines. Hammy Birthday Ohio, a large sculpture sponsored by the Ohio Bicentennial Commission, was placed in this garden after participating in Cincinnati's Big Pig Gig event. The sides of the pig depict a bicentennial barn on one side and a cornfield on the other.

The Walled Garden in the far northeast corner of the property provides enough flowers for the decoration of the house, and plenty of vegetables for the daily consumption of the residence. The garden also houses several plants found only along the banks of the Ohio River, including the renowned Ammon's Blue.

The Greenhouse sits between the garden and the Carriage House/Gift Shop. The main charge of the Greenhouse is to nurse sick plants back to health and to start new plants for the gardens. The Gift Shop and Service Building was built to benefit the Friends of the Governor's Residence and Heritage Garden, a non-profit organization with the responsibility of the maintenance of the property. Large solar panels grace the roof of these structures and supply the residence with electricity with the extra power being sold back to the city.

The Kettle Lake Bog rests directly to the south of the carriage house. The Kettle Lake Bog Garden is partially enclosed by curved brick walls with built-in benches. In the center is a depression once used as a fishpond, but was partially filled with quartz gravel and was transformed into a bog. Cranberry, Pitcher plant, Peat, Sphagnum moss and Bog orchid are some of the plants that fill the current garden.

The Garden of the Lost also rests in the location as the bog and illustrate the many plants that were lost to Ohio due to glacial movements and climate changes. Some of the plants in this garden are Sweetbay magnolia and Florida corkwood.

The reverse L-shaped Jeffrey-Carlile Rose Garden is located at the northern end of the East Terrace and contain several varieties of roses bred by Ohioans. There has been a rose garden located in the area ever since the building of the house. The roses planted by the Carliles died due to soil-borne illnesses and disease. Master gardeners were hired to replant and cultivate the gardens.

Across the East Lawn from the Rose Garden is the L-shaped Prairie Garden. River gravel lines the beds and represents the western half of the state. Among the plants found in the garden are Shooting stars, Spiderwort, and Purple coneflower. The pergola runs along the southern border of this garden and has several climbing plants such as Wisteria and Clematis.

=== Residence ===
The residence is of the Jacobean Revival style, with a few modern elements blending into the original scheme. The walls consist of a combination of stucco and limestone with Bedford stone quoins on the corners, capping of the gables, and framing the windows and doorframes. The stone exterior are broken up by portions of half-timbered panels on the second floor. The gable roof is of sturdy pitched slate with several large brick chimneys protruding from the house. The second floor also contains several bay windows.

The front entrance is reached by a flight of stairs and sits within a two-story gabled projection. Doric pilasters are carved into the sides of the door frame and support carved rosettes located above and around the door. As the projection reaches towards the sky, machicolation adds interest to the vertical plane. The large oak door rests on massive hinges and has several carved recessed panels and serves as a transition to the inside.

== Interior ==
The first floor of the residence serves as public rooms and reception areas. These rooms feature works of notable Ohioans or are historic to the house collections. The second floor houses the private quarters of the governor and his family and represents the preferences of the governor.

The entrance hall is laid out over a polished slate stone floor and carved oak paneling reaching up to the oak-beamed ceiling. A staircase with a carved open strapwork- pattern balustrade graces the hall. Two torchieres and chairs original to the house are located to either side of the door as well as a chest belonging to Mrs. Carlile, the last private resident of the house.

The formal dining room is located to the left of the entrance hall and has full oak paneling and plaster ceiling decorations shaped like rosettes. A carved stone fireplace and mantel is recessed into the wall to the right. The fireplace has a decorative carved frieze supporting the mantel and is resting on Doric pilasters. A bay window is the focal point of the room and has a small lip forming the base. The bay is formed by six large rectangular bottom windows with six smaller square windows on top. To the left of the room are two sets of French doors with a rectangular window above. A large dining table rests in the middle of the room, with a gold and crystal chandelier hanging above the table.

The sunken living room is located to the right of the entrance hall and also has full oak paneling and plaster decorative rosettes on the ceiling. A fireplace identical to the one in the dining room sits across from the entrance hall doors. To the right is a large bay window much like the one in the dining room, which overlooks the front yard and gardens. Two large French doors frame the fireplace and lead to the sitting room beyond.

== See also ==
- Columbus Foundation, at the Old Governor's Mansion
