= Tennessee Governor's Mansion =

Coordinates: 36.090660°N 86.775716°W

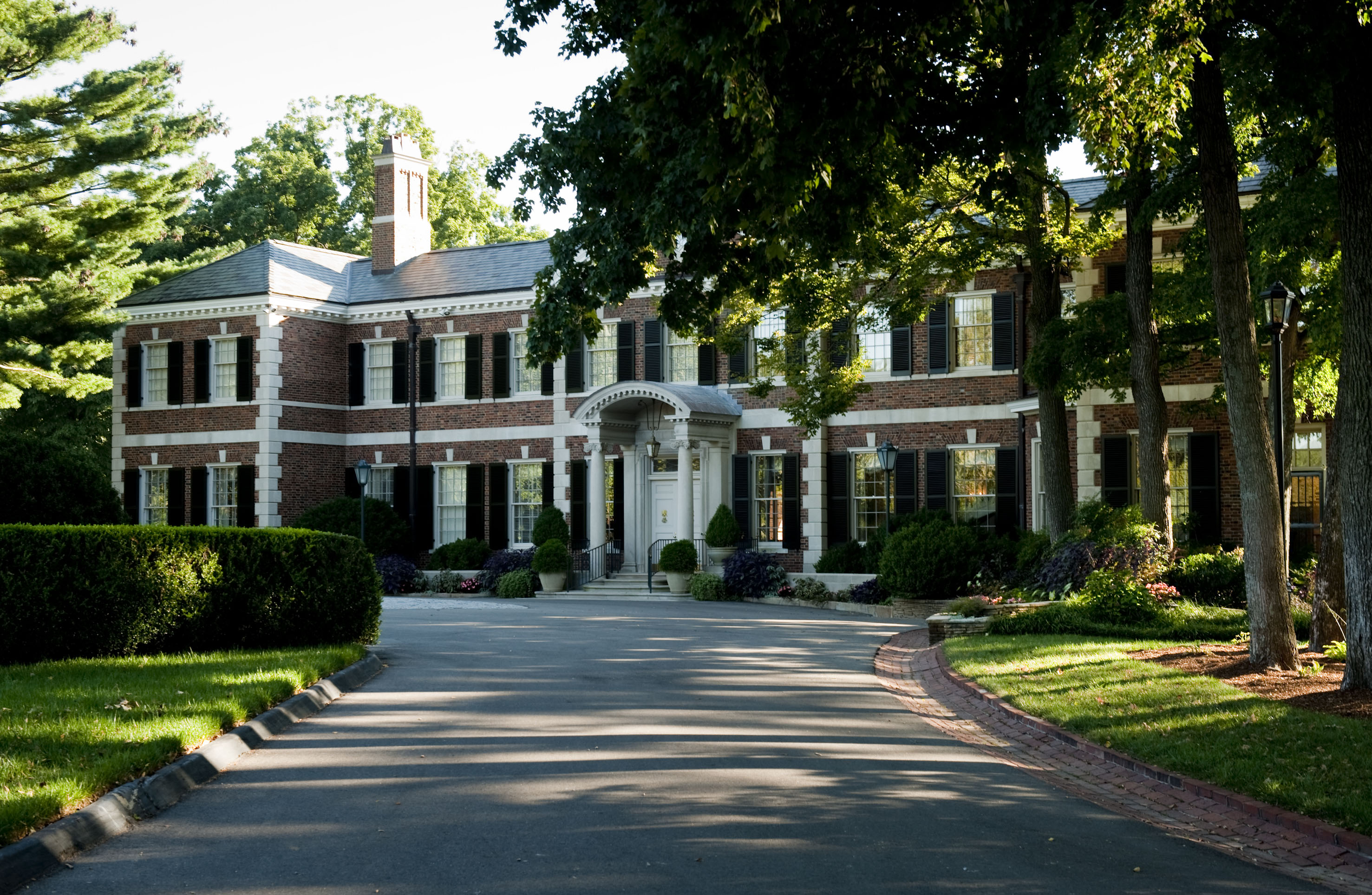
- Interactive map of the Tennessee Governor's Mansion area

General information
- Architectural style: Georgian
- Completed: 1929

Design and construction
- Architect: Russell E. Hart

The Tennessee Governor's Mansion, also known as the Tennessee Residence, in Oak Hill, Tennessee, a suburb of Nashville, is the official residence of the governor of Tennessee and their family. It is a three-story Georgian-style mansion that was built as a private home for William Ridley Wills and his family in 1929. It is on a 10-acre (4.0 ha) tract about 5 miles (8.0 km) south of the Tennessee State Capitol in Nashville. The state purchased the house in 1949 and it has served as the home of Tennessee's governors since then. The house is open to the public for tours by advance reservation.

It is one of four official state governor's residences in the country that is not located within its state's capital (the others being Drumthwacket, located in Princeton, New Jersey, instead of Trenton; the Wisconsin Governor's Mansion, located in Maple Bluff, instead of Madison; and the Ohio Governor's Mansion, located in Bexley instead of Columbus, Ohio).

== Renovation ==
The first renovation since the residence was purchased by the state was completed during the spring of 2010. The project was initiated in 2005 by Andrea Conte, the wife of then-Governor Phil Bredesen. For years, maintenance had been deferred by governors wary of alienating voters. Prior to the renovation, the slate roof leaked, ceiling and wall plaster had many cracks, lead-based paint was peeling, and the residence was still heated and cooled by the original hot and cold water radiator system. Two other major problems were the relative lack of accessibility for disabled persons, and inadequate formal dining/gathering space. The formal dining room seated only 22 people, but state dinners often had more than 50 guests. In those situations, tents were erected on the front lawn along with port-o-let toilets for the guests of state to use.

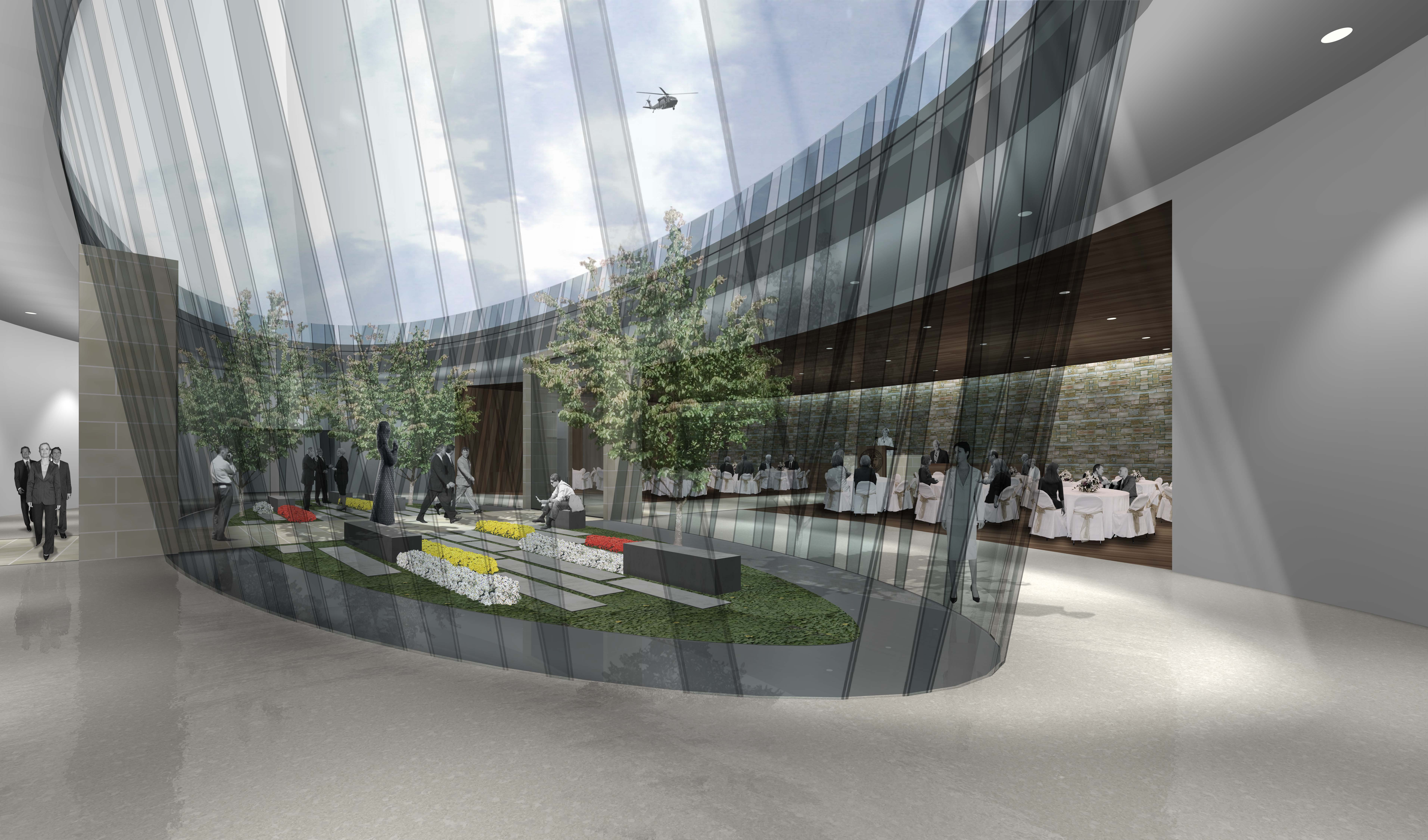
Conservatory Hall LEED certified extension built in 2009

To address these problems, the Memphis-based architectural firm Archimania was selected to design what was to be named Conservation Hall, which was completed during the spring of 2010. It is a 14,000-square-foot (1,300 m^{2}) mainly underground dining and meeting room capable of seating 160 people. The center of Conservation Hall is a glass-walled oval atrium that opens to the sky. It is Leadership in Energy and Environmental Design (LEED)-certified, the first governor's residence to be given the LEED designation.
