= Little Harpeth River =

Coordinates: 35.9339519°N 86.759999°W

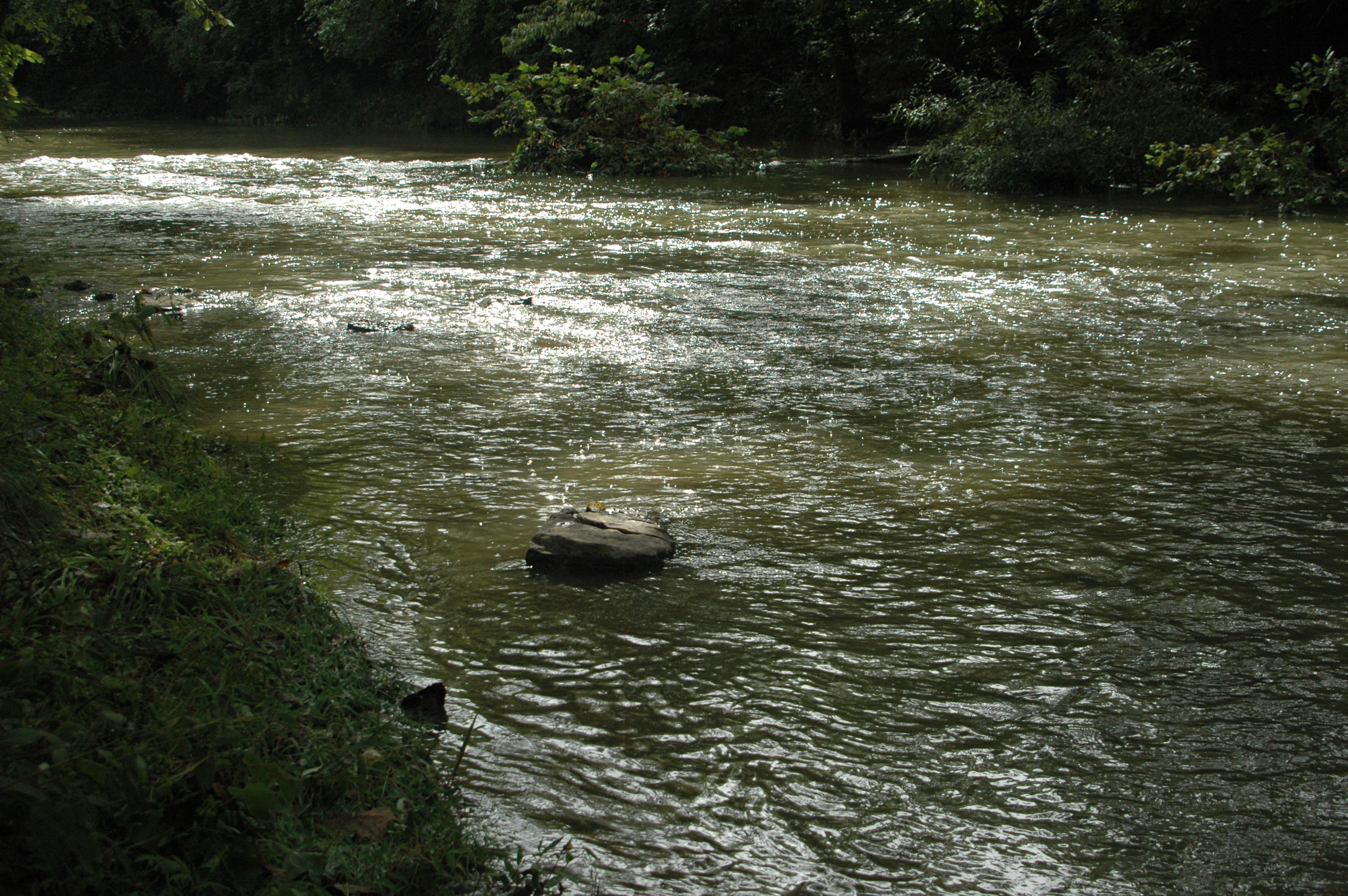
- The Little Harpeth near Nashville

Location
- Country: United States
- State: Tennessee

Physical characteristics
- Source
  - location: Williamson County, Tennessee
  - elevation: 545 ft (166 m)
- Mouth
  - location: Harpeth River
- Length: 16.3 mi (26.2 km)

The Little Harpeth River is a 16.3-mile-long (26.2 km) tributary of the Harpeth River in Tennessee, just south of Nashville. Via the Harpeth, Cumberland, and Ohio rivers, it is part of the Mississippi River watershed.

The Little Harpeth rises in Williamson County, Tennessee near the community of Clovercroft. From there it flows north-northwest, entering and largely draining the Nashville suburb of Brentwood, where it crosses the golf course belonging to the local country club. The Brentwood area marks where the stream begins a largely west-northwest course. Crossing into Davidson County, it passes Edwin Warner Park, one of the largest municipal parks in the Southern United States, and provides a lovely setting for some of the picnic areas. From there, it flows into the main Harpeth River (colloquially called the "Big Harpeth") near the Bellevue area of Nashville. Its major tributaries are Beech Creek and Otter Creek, which is impounded several miles above its confluence with the Little Harpeth to form Radnor Lake, the focal point of Radnor Lake State Natural Area.

== See also ==
- List of rivers of Tennessee
