= Wisconsin Governor's Mansion =

Executive residence in US state

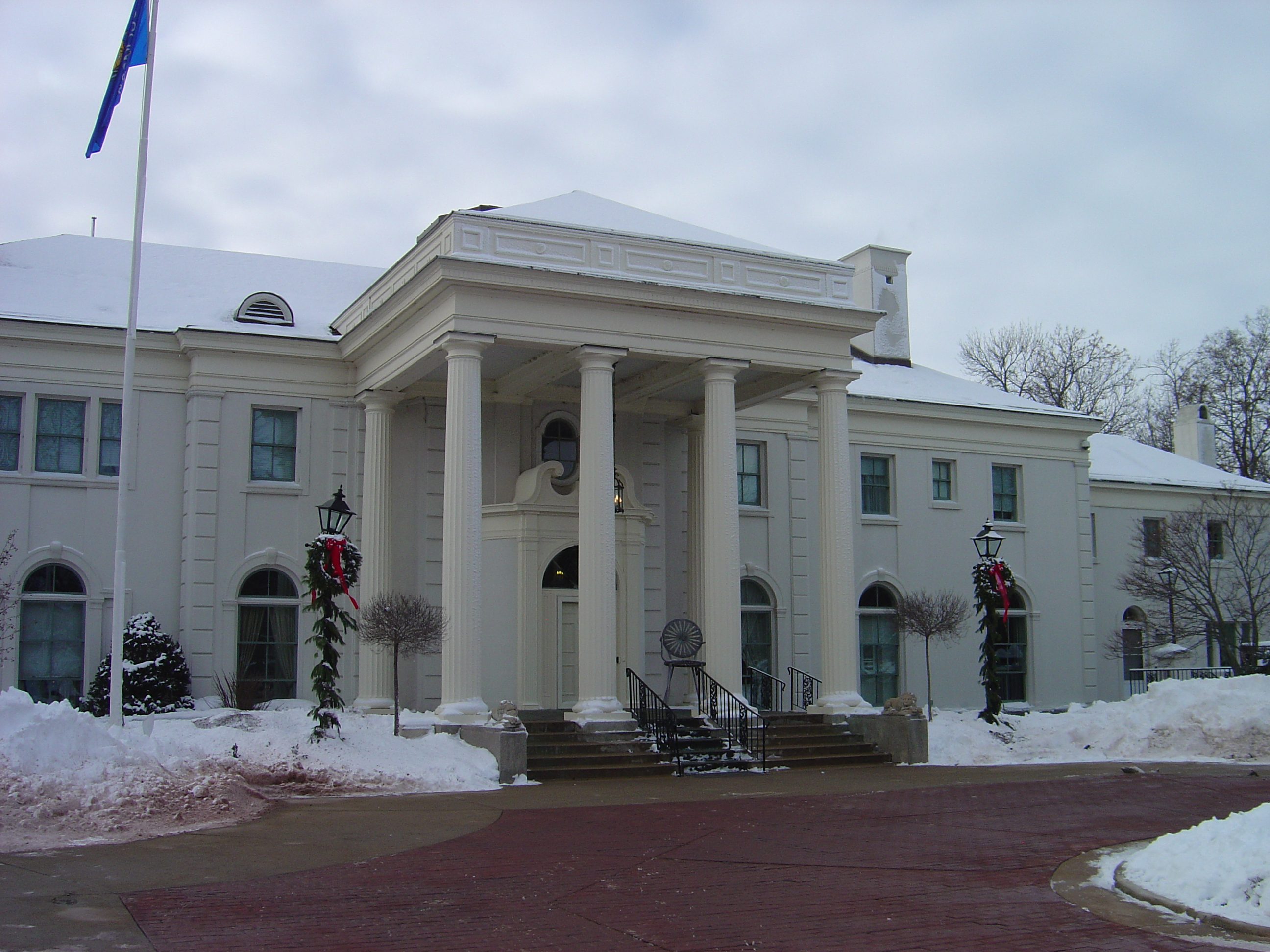
- Wisconsin Governor's Executive Residence front entrance in winter.

- Location within Wisconsin Location within the United States

General information
- Architectural style: Classical Revival
- Location: 99 Cambridge Road; Madison, Wisconsin; U.S.
- Coordinates: 43°6′31.20″N 89°22′11.32″W
- Current tenants: Tony Evers & Kathy Evers
- Construction started: 1921
- Completed: 1928
- Owner: State of Wisconsin

Design and construction
- Architect: Frank M. Riley

Website
- wisconsinexecutiveresidence.com

The Executive Residence, known better as the Governor's Mansion, is the official residence of the Governor of Wisconsin. Located at 99 Cambridge Road in the Village of Maple Bluff, Wisconsin (a suburb of the state capital of Madison), on the eastern shore of Lake Mendota, it is currently occupied by Tony Evers.

The Wisconsin Governor's Mansion is one of four governor's residences in the United States not within a state capital's municipal limits, though all of them are located within the county containing the state capital. The others are Drumthwacket, located in Princeton, New Jersey, instead of Trenton; the Ohio Governor's Mansion, located in suburban Bexley outside Columbus; and the Tennessee Governor's Mansion, located in Oak Hill, just outside Nashville.

== History ==
Construction began in 1920 for Madison industrialist Carl A. Johnson as a home. Twelve years later, it was purchased by Thomas R. Hefty, a Madison banker, who sold it to the State during 1949 for $47,500. Governors of Wisconsin, and their families, have resided in the residence ever since. Up to this time, they had resided in the Old Executive Mansion.

Architect Frank M. Riley of Madison designed the mansion in the southern Classical Revival style. The Residence sits on 3.7 acres (15,000 m^{2}) along Lake Mendota. Although it was renovated extensively during the 1960s, the Residence now is much as Johnson planned originally. The more than 16,000 square feet (1,500 m^{2}) of living space include 34 rooms, 13 bathrooms and 7 bedrooms and fireplaces. Several items of Wisconsin historical interest may be found throughout the Executive Residence. The wrought-iron fence on the street side of the property originally surrounded the old State Capitol Building. The mansion is wood-framed structure with painted stucco over sandstone and hollow clay tile face. It is three stories high and has a basement level for a total of 23,455 gross square feet. There are 10 major garden areas, including a screened-in gazebo and winding walkways that lead to the lake shore.

== Public access ==
An estimated 20,000 visitors a year pass through the doors for receptions, dinners, meetings, and public tours. Governor Tony Evers is the 15th governor to live in the Executive Residence. There is no charge for admission. Groups of 20 or more are required to make a reservation. Public access to the facility was limited during the COVID-19 pandemic.

== Solar power ==
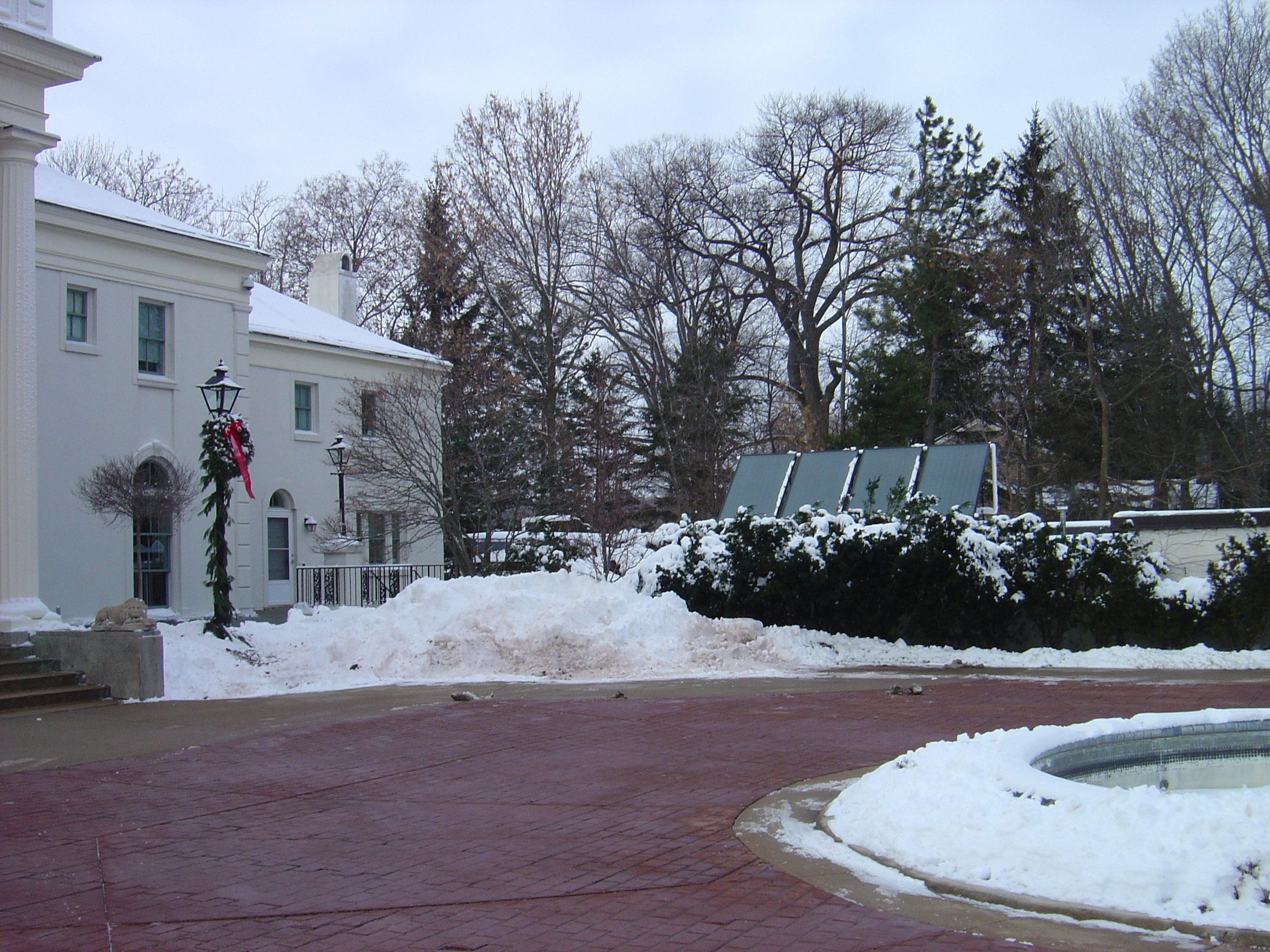
Solar panels at the executive residence.

In 2009, then Governor Jim Doyle requested the installation of solar panels on the side roof of the governor's mansion. The plan was approved by a board that handles building projects. The panels power the water heater for the residence.

== Administration ==
The building is administered by the State Capitol & Executive Residence Board (SCERB), which must approve the annual maintenance budget and major capital improvements. The 16-member State Capitol Executive Residence Board includes 7 citizen members with specified expertise appointed by the governor to serve staggered 6-year terms. The purpose of the State Capitol and Executive Residence Board is to: "direct the continuing and consistent maintenance of the property, decorative furniture and furnishings of the Capitol and Executive Residence". The staff of the Residence are part of the Wisconsin Department of Administration's Capitol Bureau Building Management team. An on-site Wisconsin Capitol Police detail guards the building year-round.

The Wisconsin Executive Residence Foundation, a non-profit, raises money to pay for maintenance that SCERB is unable or unwilling to spend state tax dollars on. The Wisconsin Executive Residence Foundation was established during 1964 by act of the Wisconsin Legislature at the request of Dorothy Knowles, the wife of Governor Warren Knowles. She said at the time " the place was a firetrap, we were afraid to move in." After the establishment of the foundation, the Residence received its first major renovation since its purchase during 1949. The Governor's spouse acts as ex-officio chair of the foundation's board.

== See also ==
- Old Governor's Mansion (Madison, Wisconsin)
