= Overton Lane =

- U.S. National Register of Historic Places
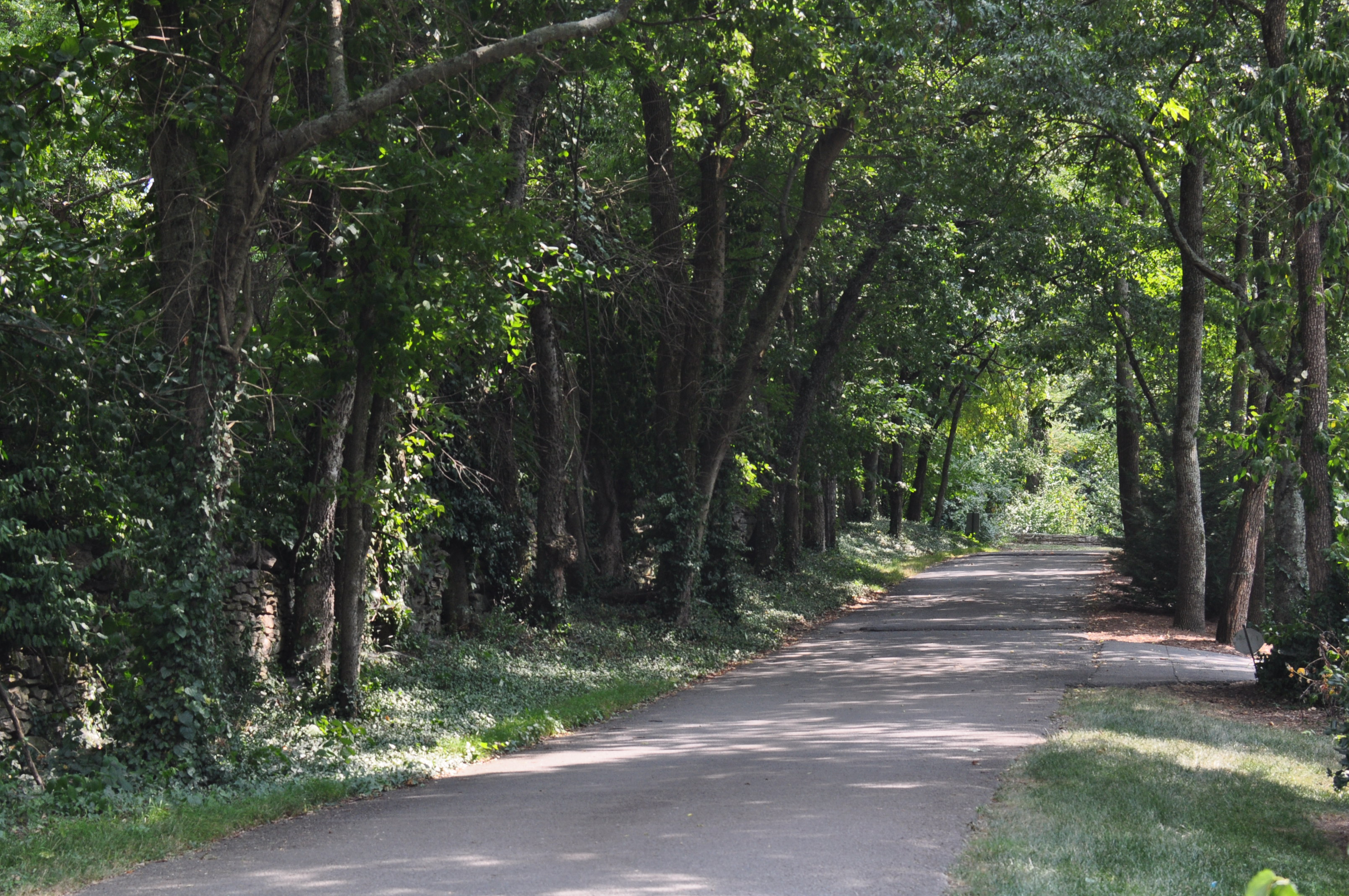
- Overton Lane in 2014

- Location within Tennessee
- Location: Kirkman Lane, Oak Hill, Tennessee
- Coordinates: 36°5′12″N 86°48′1″W
- Area: 2 acres (0.81 ha)
- Built: 1845
- NRHP reference No.: 80003795
- Added to NRHP: July 17, 1980

Overton Lane is a historic lane in Oak Hill, Tennessee, U.S.. It was built in the 1840s to separate the plantations owned by John Overton and John M. Lea. The lane was a strategic location in the Battle of Nashville, during the American Civil War. It has been listed on the National Register of Historic Places since July 17, 1980.
