= Otter Creek (Tennessee) =

Coordinates: 36.0441667°N 86.7913889°W

Location
- Country: United States
- State: Tennessee

Physical characteristics
- Source
  - location: Radnor Lake
  - elevation: 594 ft (181 m)
- Mouth
  - location: Little Harpeth River
- Length: 6.5 mi (10.5 km)

Otter Creek is a 6.5-mile-long (10.5 km) creek in Davidson County, Tennessee. It is the effluent of Radnor Lake, and flows through Radnor Lake State Natural Area. It is a tributary of the Little Harpeth River, and via the Little Harpeth, Harpeth, Cumberland, and Ohio rivers, it is part of the Mississippi River watershed.

The creek gets its name because it once contained river otters.

Otter Creek is the type locality for the Fishhook Crayfish (faxonius rhoadesi, originally documented as orconectes rhoadesi). The species was described in 1949 by Horton H. Hobbs Jr. from specimens collected and misattributed as orconectes validus in 1897.

== See also ==
- List of rivers of Tennessee
