= Russell E. Hart =

American architect (1872–1955)

- Born: 1872; Darlington, South Carolina, U.S.
- Died: June 11, 1955 (aged 82–83); Nashville, Tennessee, U.S.
- Resting place: Darlington, South Carolina, U.S.
- Education: Furman University
- Occupation: Architect
- Spouse: Elizabeth Douthit
- Children: 1 son

Russell E. Hart (1872 - June 11, 1955) was an American architect. He designed or restored many buildings in Tennessee, including the Tennessee Governor's Mansion and the Parthenon

== Life ==
Hart was born in 1872 in Darlington, South Carolina. He graduated from Furman University in 1895. He studied Gothic Revival architecture in Paris, France, and he was trained by Noland and Baskervill in Richmond, Virginia, and Cram, Goodhue & Ferguson in New York City.

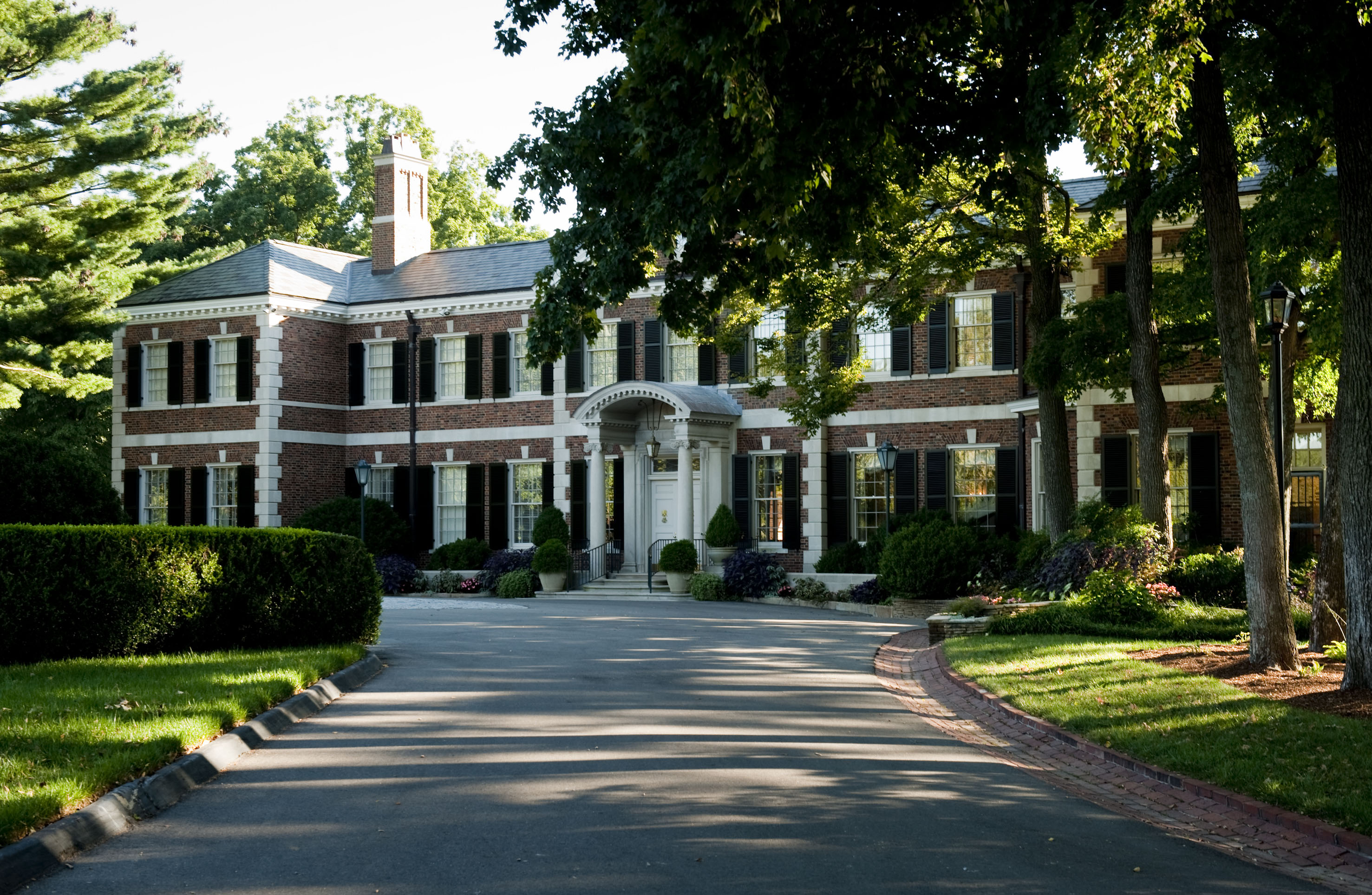
The Tennessee Governor's Mansion, designed by Hart

Hart became an architect in Nashville, Tennessee in 1910. He was the resident architect during the building of the Hermitage Hotel in Nashville, while employed by J.E.R. Carpenter. He designed the Tennessee Governor's Mansion in 1929. He restored the Parthenon in Centennial Park, originally designed by William Crawford Smith in 1897. He was a partner in Hart, Freeland & Roberts from 1947 to his death, and he was a member of the American Institute of Architects.

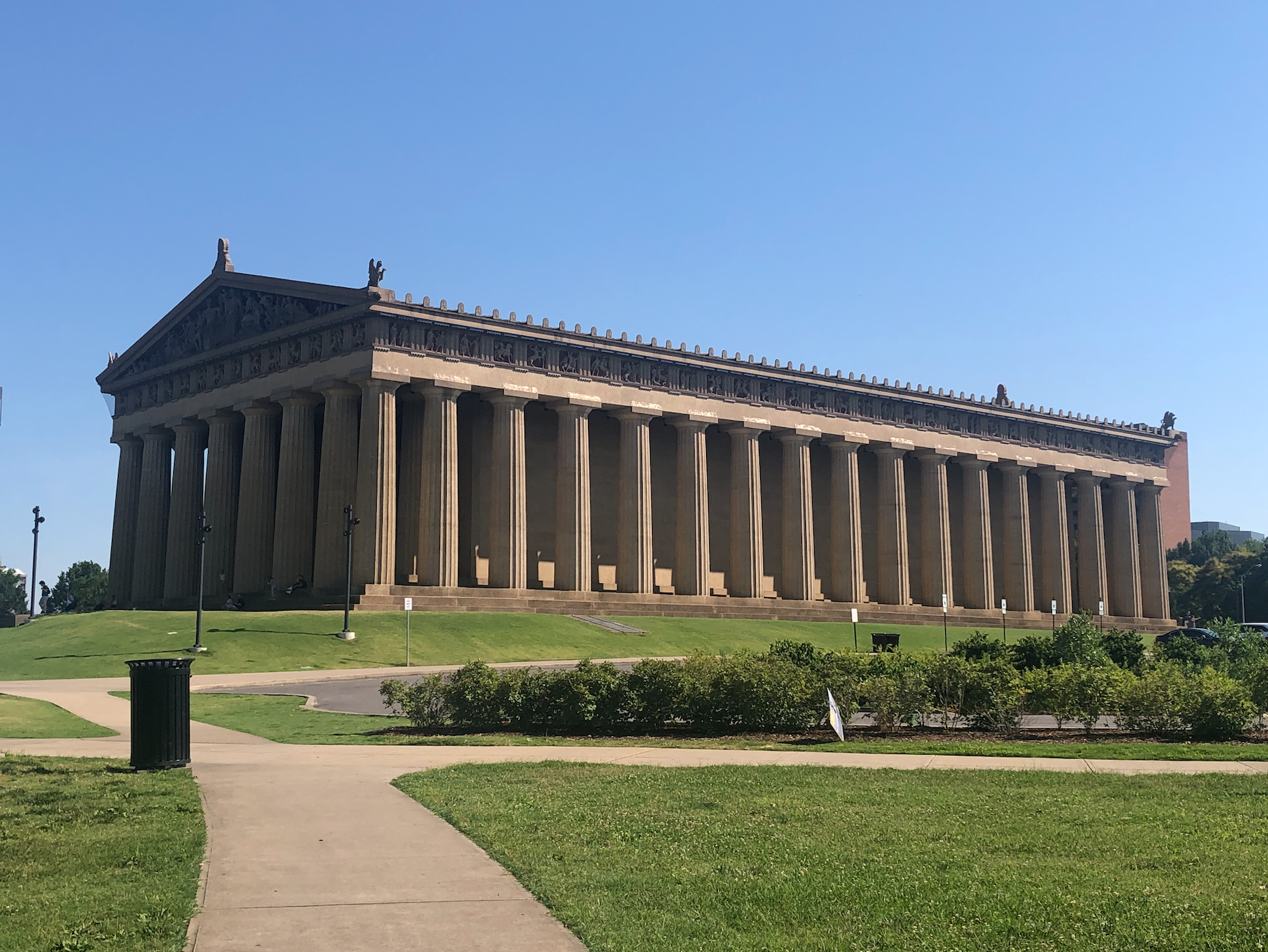
The Parthenon, restored by Hart

Hart resided at 212 Jackson Boulevard in Belle Meade, Tennessee, with his wife, née Elizabeth Douthit, and their son, Maxwell Hart. He was a 33rd Degree Freemason. He died on June 11, 1955, in Nashville, Tennessee, at the age of 82, and he was buried in Darlington, South Carolina.
