= Conservation Hall =

Coordinates: 36.094072°N 86.777658°W

Conservation Hall was part of a renovation of the Tennessee Governor's Mansion. It is a 14,000-square-foot (1,300 m^{2}) subterranean meeting and banqueting facility built under the front lawn of the Tennessee Residence. It brings the Tennessee Residence up to modern standards for State receptions and dinners with its ability to seat up to 160 people. The centerpiece of Conservation Hall is the glass-walled oval atrium and courtyard that opens to the sky.

The renovation project was spearheaded by Tennessee First Lady Andrea Conte. Her goals for the project were threefold: To better manage official functions at the Tennessee Residence, to protect the historical integrity of the property and the surrounding neighborhood, and to encourage energy-efficient operation and minimal environmental impact.

The Memphis architecture firm, Archimania, won the architectural design competition because of their experience in sustainable design, as well as their unusual idea to hide the new construction underneath the front lawn, rather than compete with the existing residence. The Residence has been awarded LEED certification from the Green Building Certification Institute and the U.S. Green Building Council. The state plans to seek LEED certification for Conservation Hall in a separate application.
