= Thomas E. Coleman =

American politician (1893–1964)

Chair of the Republican Party of Wisconsin
- In office 1951–1955

Personal details
- Born: Thomas Emmet Coleman; February 20, 1893 Aurora, Illinois, U.S.
- Died: February 4, 1964 (aged 70)
- Cause of death: Cancer
- Party: Republican
- Spouse: Catherine Head
- Children: 3
- Education: University of Chicago
- Profession: Politician

Thomas Emmet Coleman (February 20, 1893 – February 4, 1964) was an American politician who served as chairman of the Republican Party of Wisconsin.

== Biography ==
Coleman was born Thomas Emmett Coleman in 1893 in Aurora, Illinois. He moved to Madison, Wisconsin, when he was two years old. Coleman graduated from the University of Chicago and married Catherine Head, with whom he had three children. He died of cancer in 1964.

== Career ==
Coleman was Chairman of the Republican Party of Wisconsin from 1951 to 1955. He was a delegate to the Republican National Convention in 1944, 1948 and 1952. At the 1952 convention, he served as a floor leader. Coleman was also President of Maple Bluff, Wisconsin.
