= Phil Bredesen =

Governor of Tennessee from 2003 to 2011

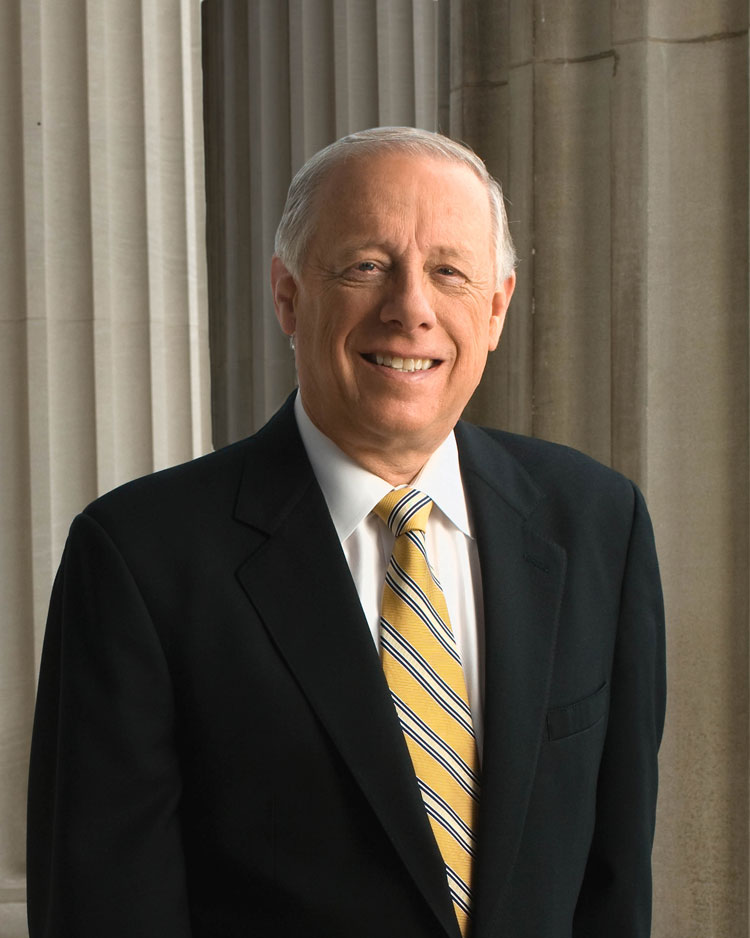
- Official portrait, 2008

48th Governor of Tennessee
- In office January 18, 2003 – January 15, 2011
- Lieutenant: John Wilder; Ron Ramsey
- Preceded by: Don Sundquist
- Succeeded by: Bill Haslam

4th Mayor of Metropolitan Nashville
- In office September 27, 1991 – September 24, 1999
- Preceded by: Bill Boner
- Succeeded by: Bill Purcell

Personal details
- Born: Philip Norman Bredesen Jr. November 21, 1943 (age 82) Oceanport, New Jersey, U.S.
- Party: Democratic
- Spouses: Susan Cleaves (m. 1968; div. 1974); Andrea Conte (m. 1974)
- Children: 1
- Education: Harvard University (BA)

Philip Norman Bredesen Jr. (/ˈbrɛdəsən/; born November 21, 1943) is an American politician and businessman who served as the 48th governor of Tennessee from 2003 to 2011. A member of the Democratic Party, he was elected in 2002 with 50.6% of the vote and re-elected in 2006 with 68.6%. He served as the 66th mayor of Nashville from 1991 to 1999. Bredesen is the founder of the HealthAmerica Corporation, which he sold in 1986. He is the last Democrat to win and/or hold statewide office in Tennessee.

Since 2011, he has been chair of Silicon Ranch Corporation, a firm that develops and operates solar power stations. On December 6, 2017, Bredesen announced he would run for Bob Corker's open seat in the United States Senate, as Corker chose not to seek reelection in 2018. On August 2, 2018, he won the Democratic primary and faced off against Republican nominee Marsha Blackburn. He lost in the general election on November 6, 2018. After losing the Senate race, he and his campaign team founded Clearloop, a renewable energy startup.

Bredesen has been widely characterized as a moderate Democrat who is fiscally conservative but socially liberal.

== Early life and private career ==
Bredesen was born in Oceanport, New Jersey, the son of Norma Lucille (Walborn) and Philip Norman Bredesen. His parents divorced and his mother was employed as a bank teller. During Bredesen's childhood, his grandmother, who sewed for a living, lived with the family. Bredesen grew up in Shortsville, New York, 30 miles from Rochester. He attended Red Jacket Central Elementary and Secondary School in the adjoining village of Manchester.

He received a scholarship to Harvard University, where he graduated with an undergraduate degree in physics. In 1967, Bredesen moved to Lexington, Massachusetts, where he did classified work for Itek and received a draft deferment during the Vietnam War.

In 1968, Bredesen worked for the campaign of Minnesota Senator Eugene McCarthy, who was seeking the Democratic presidential nomination. Bredesen launched his first political campaign in 1969, when he ran for the Massachusetts State Senate. He was defeated by a popular incumbent Republican, Ronald MacKenzie.

Bredesen joined pharmaceutical firm G.D. Searle & Company in 1971, and moved to London in 1973 to manage one of the company's divisions. In 1974, he married Andrea Conte. In 1975, the family moved to Nashville, Tennessee, where Conte had been recruited by Hospital Corporation of America. In Nashville, Bredesen founded HealthAmerica Corp., an insurance company. He sold his controlling interest in HealthAmerica in 1986, and because of the wealth he earned from the company, did not accept his gubernatorial salary.

== Political involvement ==
=== Mayor of Nashville ===
In 1987, Bredesen ran for mayor of Nashville. He finished second out of 10 candidates with 30% of the vote, behind only 5th District Congressman Bill Boner, who won 46%. Since Boner fell short of the necessary threshold for an outright victory, he and Bredesen faced each other in a runoff. Boner won the runoff, 75,790 votes to 66,153, largely by emphasizing that he was a Nashville native while Bredesen was a Northerner.

In December 1987, Bredesen ran in the Democratic primary for the 5th District congressional seat left open by Boner's victory. He finished a distant second behind Bob Clement, son of former governor Frank G. Clement.

Ahead of the 1991 mayoral race, Boner was accused of marital infidelity, and declined to run. Bredesen won the election, defeating Councilwoman Betty Nixon, 78,896 votes to 30,282.

As mayor of Nashville, Bredesen added more than 440 new teachers, built 32 new schools and renovated 43 others. He also implemented a back-to-basics curriculum to teach students the fundamentals of learning. Under the Bredesen Administration, the NFL's Houston Oilers (now Tennessee Titans) were brought to Nashville and furnished with a new stadium, Nissan Stadium; the NHL awarded Nashville its first of four new expansion franchises, the Nashville Predators; and Bridgestone Arena was built. Bredesen also attempted to lure the NBA's Minnesota Timberwolves and later the NHL's New Jersey Devils to Nashville, but both efforts were unsuccessful. A new downtown library was built as a cornerstone of major improvements to the entire library system, the city's downtown entertainment district was renovated, and two parks, Beaman Park and Shelby Bottoms, were established.

Bredesen did not run for a third term in 1999. The Metro Charter had been amended in 1994 to limit city council members to two consecutive four-year terms, and was worded in such a way that it appeared to apply to mayors as well. Although mayors had been permitted to serve a maximum of three consecutive terms since the formation of Metro Nashville in 1963, Bredesen did not make an issue of that.

=== Governor of Tennessee ===
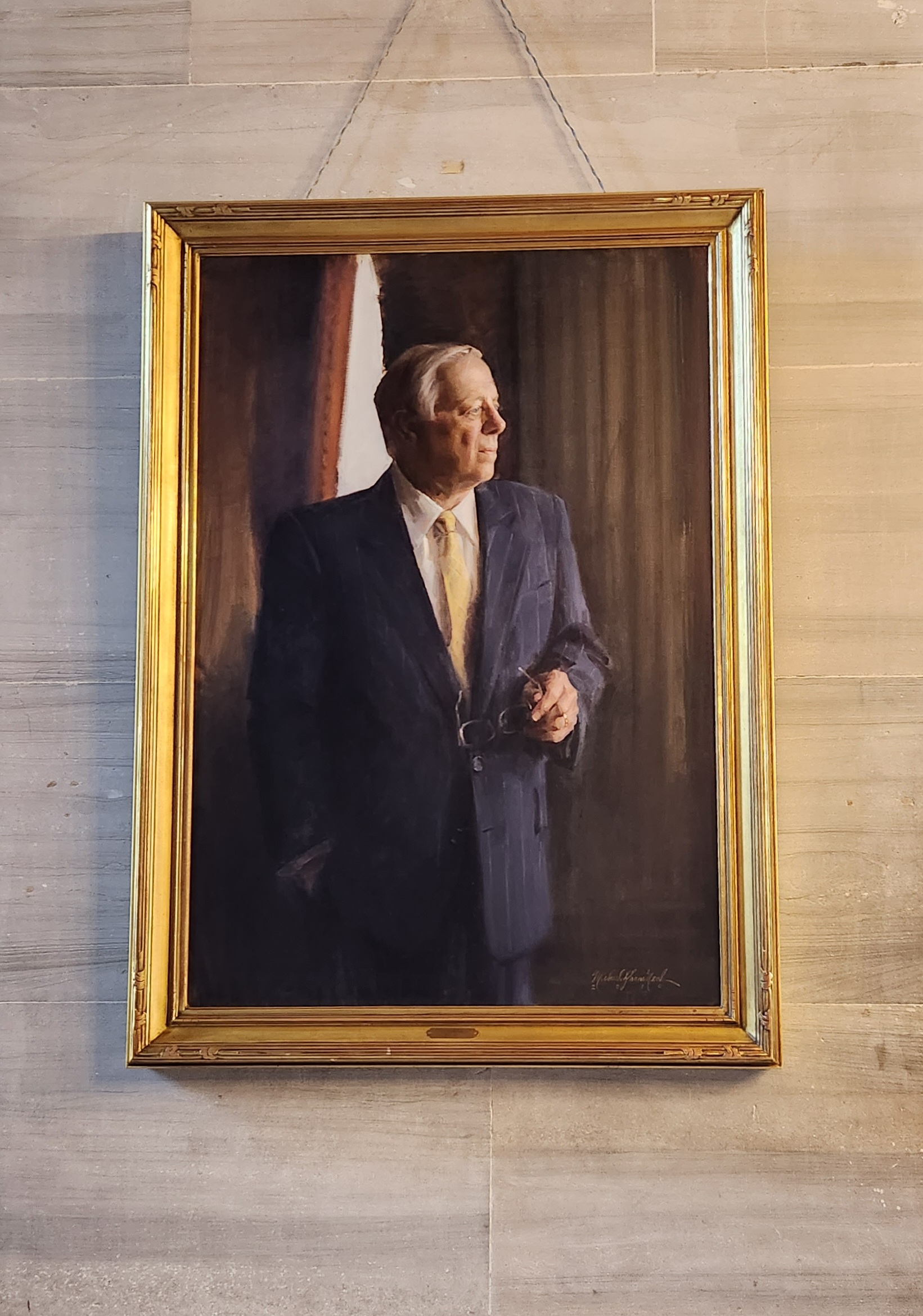
Official portrait of Phil Bredesen, hanging in the Tennessee State Capitol

Bredesen declared his candidacy for the 1994 Tennessee gubernatorial election in November 1993. He won the Democratic nomination for governor, capturing 53% of the vote in a primary that included more than a half-dozen candidates, among them Shelby County Mayor Bill Morris and state senator Steve Cohen. In the November general election, Bredesen was defeated by the Republican nominee, 7th district U.S. Representative Don Sundquist, 807,104 votes to 664,252.

Bredesen ran for governor of Tennessee again in 2002. He easily won the Democratic nomination, capturing nearly 80% of the vote in a six-candidate primary, and faced Republican 4th district U.S. Representative Van Hilleary in November (the incumbent, Sundquist, was term-limited). Bredesen promised to manage state government better, improve Tennessee's schools and use his experience as a managed-care executive to fix TennCare, which had created a critical budget shortfall toward the end of Sundquist's term. His reputation as a moderate Democrat was well established (he is a member of the "good government" faction of the Nashville Democratic Party), so Hilleary's attempts to brand him as a liberal ultimately failed. Republicans also suffered from Sundquist's unpopular attempts to implement a state income tax. Bredesen garnered more support in East Tennessee than was usual for a Democrat, especially one from Nashville. In November, Bredesen narrowly defeated Hilleary, 837,284 votes to 786,803.

==== First term ====
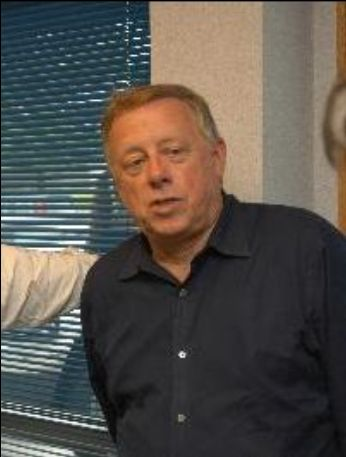
Bredesen in 2003

Bredesen became governor amid a fiscal crisis, with a predicted state budget shortfall of $800 million. Much of the shortfall was due to TennCare, which was $650 million over budget. Sundquist had hoped to remedy the budget shortfall by implementing an income tax, but this proved wildly unpopular and was never enacted. Bredesen argued that services would have to be cut, saying, "you can't have Massachusetts services and Tennessee taxes." In 2003, he signed a 9% across-the-board spending cut. In 2004, he enacted a series of changes to TennCare, essentially removing 191,000 Medicaid-eligible patients and reducing benefits. By 2006, these changes had reduced the program's cost by more than $500 million. Bredesen used some of the savings to establish a "safety net" for health clinics affected by the cuts. In 2006, he implemented "Cover Tennessee" to cover people with preexisting conditions and the uninsured.

During his first term, Bredesen enacted a number of measures aimed at improving education. In 2003, the state established the Tennessee Lottery to fund college scholarships for the state's high school graduates. Teachers' pay was raised above the average salary in the Southeast, and Tennessee's pre-kindergarten initiative was expanded to include a statewide program for four-year-olds. Bredesen created the Governor's Books from Birth Foundation, a statewide expansion of Dolly Parton's Imagination Library that offers free books for children, and in his fourth year, he signed legislation that increased funding for education by $366.5 million, much of which came from savings due to TennCare reform.

To attract new industry, Bredesen worked with the General Assembly to reform Tennessee's worker compensation system (changes supported by the business community and opposed by trial lawyers), and invest in programs to help laid-off employees develop new skills. During his tenure, 2,889 companies, including Nissan and International Paper, expanded or moved to Tennessee, bringing more than 104,000 jobs and $12.8 billion in new business investment to the state.

Bredesen launched a war on methamphetamine abuse, focusing on treatment, prevention and public awareness, with the Governor's Meth-Free Tennessee initiative. Criminal penalties and resources for law enforcement were also enhanced as part of this program, which led to a 50% decline in illegal and toxic meth labs. In 2005, Bredesen signed legislation establishing the Tennessee Heritage Conservation Trust Fund, which increased the state's land-buying power in hopes of protecting ecologically significant land and conserving or restoring historically significant areas.

In his 2006 reelection campaign, Bredesen brushed off a primary challenge from John Jay Hooker, winning nearly 90% of the vote. In the general election, he defeated State Senator Jim Bryson, 1,247,491 votes to 540,853, sweeping all 95 counties and garnering more votes than any gubernatorial candidate in state history.

==== Second term ====
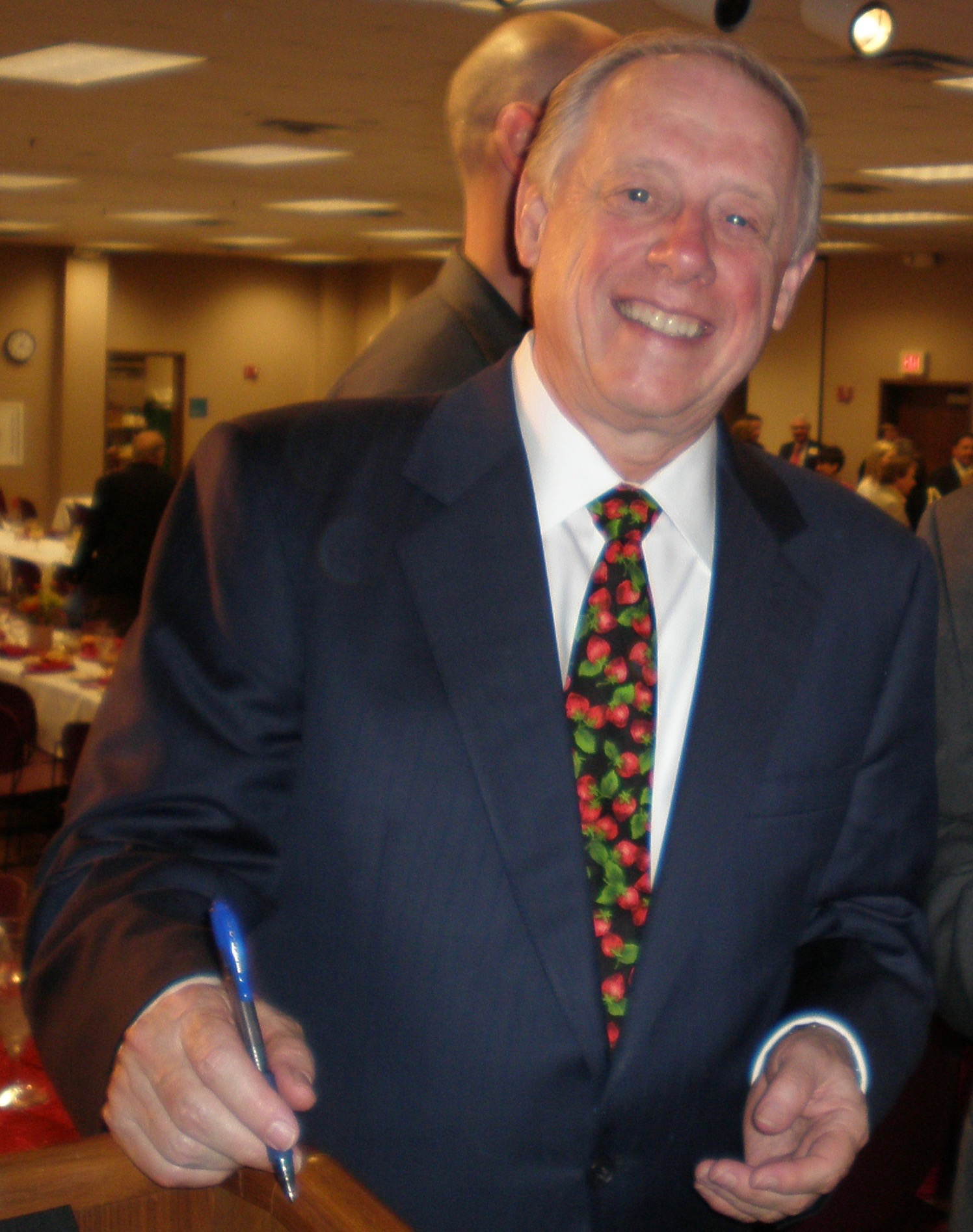
Bredesen at the 2008 Governor's Luncheon

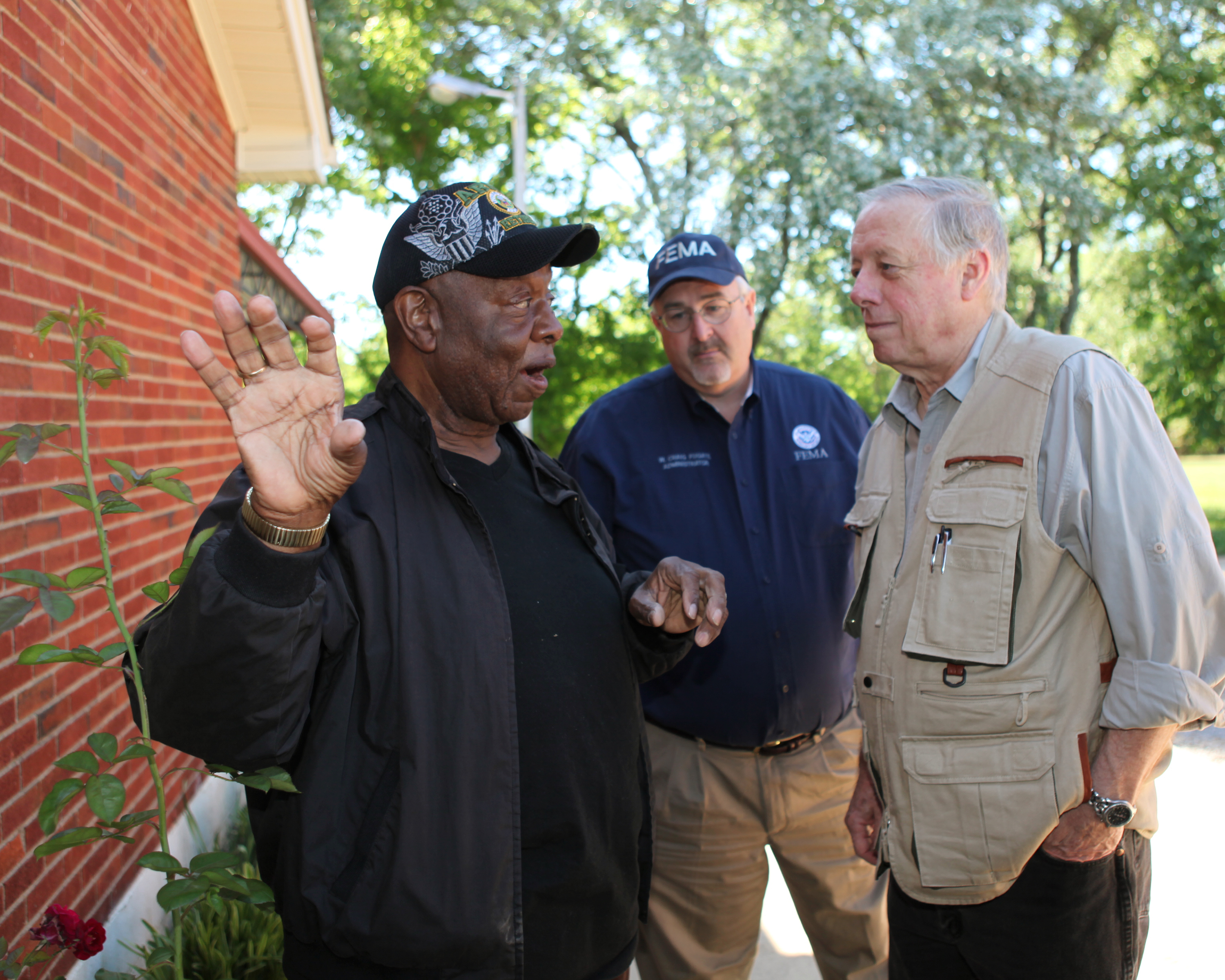
Bredesen meeting with FEMA Administrator Craig Fugate (back)

In 2007, Bredesen was criticized for proposing a private donation funded $4.8 million dining room upgrade to entertain lawmakers and other dignitaries to the Tennessee Governor's Mansion. Critics labelled the proposed complex "Bredesen's Bunker," and derided it as too elaborate and expensive.

In August 2008, Bredesen enacted further cuts to TennCare, placing restrictions on services to 10,800 TennCare patients who received some type of home nursing care. The new limits affected about 1,000 of those patients.

In the 2008 elections, Republicans gained control of both chambers of the General Assembly for the first time since Reconstruction. The onset of the Great Recession also limited what Bredesen could accomplish during his remaining years in office. In 2009, he called for nearly $129 million in state spending cuts and enacted a voluntary buyout for state employees that reduced the workforce by 5% without requiring layoffs. In April 2009, Bredesen signed a bill into law which eliminated thumbprint requirements for gun purchases. In May 2009, Bredesen vetoed a bill that would have allowed people to carry guns in bars, but the legislature overrode his veto. In June 2009, Bredesen signed a bill into law allowing loaded guns in cars.

== Post-governorship ==
Since leaving the governor's office in 2011, Bredesen has been the chairman of a solar energy plant developer.

Viewed by many as a moderate Democrat based in the South, Bredesen was touted as a potential presidential candidate in 2008, but he said he had no interest in joining the wide field of Democrats seeking the nomination. He did not comment on joining a Democratic ticket as Vice President of the United States. On June 4, 2008, Bredesen endorsed Barack Obama for U.S. president. Following the withdrawal of former Senator Tom Daschle as nominee for United States Secretary of Health and Human Services in the Obama Administration, The Atlantic correspondent Marc Ambinder reported that Bredesen was being vetted as a possible replacement. Kansas Governor Kathleen Sebelius was eventually chosen for the post.

== 2018 U.S. Senate campaign ==
Final results by county in 2018: Marsha Blackburn: 70–80%; 60–70%; 50–60%; 40–50%; Phil Bredesen: 70–80%; 60–70%; 50–60%

On September 26, 2017, incumbent Republican U.S. Senator Bob Corker announced he would not seek reelection in 2018. On December 6, 2017, Bredesen announced that he would run for Corker's open seat. Bredesen won the Democratic primary on August 2, 2018, with 348,302 votes (91.50%). Marsha Blackburn won the Republican primary on the same day.

In April 2018, Corker said that Bredesen was "a very good mayor, a very good governor, a very good business person" with "real appeal" and "crossover appeal", and that the two of them had cooperated well over the years, but that he would vote for Blackburn and contribute to her campaign. Corker said that he would not campaign against Bredesen. After Corker's praise for Bredesen, Senate Majority Leader Mitch McConnell warned Corker that such comments could cost the Republican Party its Senate majority. Shortly after Corker's comments, President Donald Trump tweeted an endorsement of Marsha Blackburn, who was running for the Republican nomination in the Senate race. During the campaign, Trump attacked Bredesen.

According to Politico, Bredesen represents a "center-right coalition" including "Chamber of Commerce-type Republicans." During the campaign, Bredesen said that he opposed Trump's tariff policy, saying that the tariffs amounted to a tax on Tennesseans and "they will drive up prices, hurt our economy and will cost jobs, especially in our important automotive sector". Bredesen praised Corker for publicly opposing Trump's tariff policy.

In October 2018, singer-songwriter Taylor Swift endorsed Bredesen. The endorsement was notable because Swift had never been publicly political before. She said Blackburn's "voting record in Congress appalls and terrifies me" and shared a link to the nonpartisan voter registration website Vote.org, which saw a significant spike in page views and new registrations.

Blackburn defeated Bredesen in the November 6 election. Although polls showed the race to be close for much of the cycle, Blackburn pulled ahead after the confirmation hearings for Justice Brett Kavanaugh, which are believed to have mobilized Republican voters. In the general election, Bredesen lost by just under 11 points, taking 43.9 percent of the vote to Blackburn's 54.7 percent. He carried only three counties — Davidson, Shelby and Haywood. The race was called for Blackburn less than half an hour after the polls closed.

== Political positions ==
Bredesen has been described as a moderate Democrat. According to The Tennessean, he is a "political moderate", "known for his middle-of-the-road, fiscally conservative politics" and has "occasionally irritated liberals in his party". On The Issues, a nonpartisan and nonprofit organization that examines politicians' records and statements, identifies Bredesen as a "moderate populist conservative". According to the Political Encyclopedia of U.S. States and Regions, Bredesen has embraced both fiscal conservatism and social liberalism "in a way that has a broad appeal to voters across the political spectrum". In his 2018 Senate campaign, Bredesen ran on a moderate platform.

The New York Times wrote of Bredesen's 2018 campaign that "in an indication of how precarious it can be to run statewide as a Democrat in the South, he also made no mention of his party and did not refer to President Trump by name."

=== Social issues ===
Bredesen has said the Affordable Care Act "needs fixing." In 2018, he said, "I was not a fan of the Affordable Care Act but when it passed, I said, 'it's the law of the land, let's make it work.'"

Bredesen is pro-choice on abortion. He supports legal access to abortion, but did not consider it a defining issue of his platform. He supported a state constitutional amendment to ban gay marriage in 2006, but supported the right of same-sex couples to adopt children. He supports non-discrimination protections for same-sex couples. Bredesen is a supporter of capital punishment.

Bredesen had an A grade from the NRA Political Victory Fund (NRA-PVF) as governor, but in 2018 was downgraded to a D grade. During his Senate campaign, he has expressed his support for the Second Amendment and described himself as a gun owner. His campaign disagreed with the D grade and has responded that Bredesen "agrees with 80-plus percent of NRA's positions [but] differs, for example, by supporting gun show background checks." In the wake of the February 2018 Stoneman Douglas High School shooting, Bredesen called for universal background checks for gun purchases (including those made at gun shows), tighter checks for mental illness, and a ban on bump stocks. As governor, he vetoed bills to allow guns in bars or restaurants that serve alcohol. He also signed into law a bill allowing gun owners with handgun permits to carry their firearms in public parks. In 2009, Bredesen said he would not veto a bill exempting certain firearms from federal regulations, allowing the bill to become law without his signature, but he had vetoed a similar bill earlier (his veto was overridden).

Regarding immigration issues, Bredesen has taken positions that are commonly associated with both parties. In 2004, Bredesen introduced a bill to "end the practice of issuing state drivers' licenses to undocumented persons." He supports DACA for undocumented immigrants brought to the US as children.

=== Judicial nominees ===
In October 2018, Bredesen broke with the Democratic Party and endorsed the confirmation of Trump's second Supreme Court nominee, Brett Kavanaugh. The endorsement came the day before the final confirmation vote on the nomination.

=== Economic and fiscal issues ===
Bredesen leans conservative on fiscal issues. He ran for governor opposing the state income tax and as governor made cuts to the state's government health care plan due to its financial trouble. Bredesen opposed the Republican Party's 2017 tax reform, saying it provided "crumbs" to the middle class. As governor, he proposed increasing taxes on cigarettes. In 2007, he expressed uncertainty about the Bush tax cuts stating they would not help everyone. He also sought to eliminate the grocery tax break arguing that funding was needed for the state's budget. He did not raise the sales tax and opposed raising taxes on gas, but did support increasing a tax on cable services. He supports an increase in the minimum wage.

== Personal life ==
Bredesen married Susan Cleaves in 1968. They divorced in 1974 and had no children. Later that year, he married Andrea Conte in Wheatley, Oxfordshire, England. The two have one son, Ben. He identifies his faith as Presbyterian.

Bredesen is a licensed pilot as well as a hunter and outdoorsman. He also paints as a personal hobby alongside his business and political career. During his tenure as governor, he occasionally used his own artwork for the official governor's holiday cards. In 2006, the card featured a painting titled Afghan Girl, which was based on a photograph taken during a visit Bredesen made to Afghanistan earlier that year.

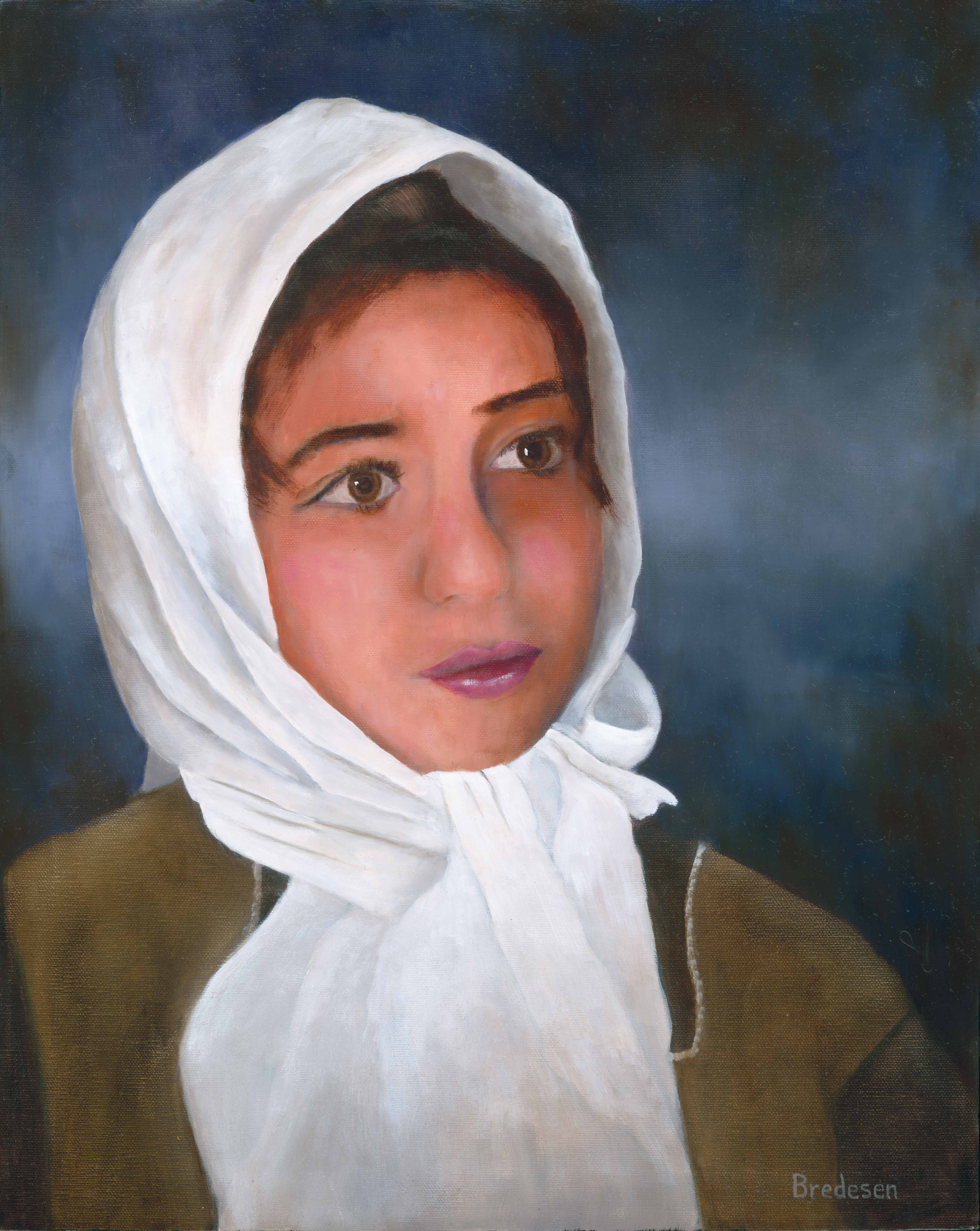
Bredesen's Afghan Girl painting

In 2018, Bredesen's net worth was estimated to be between $88.9 million and $358 million.

Bredesen is a founding member of the nonprofit Nashville's Table and he served on the board of the Frist Center.

== Electoral history ==
Tennessee gubernatorial election, 1994
Party	Candidate	Votes	%	±%
Republican	Don Sundquist	807,104	54.27%	
Democratic	Phil Bredesen	664,252	44.67%	
Independent	Stephanie E. Holt	9,981	0.67%	
Independent	Will Smith	3,365	0.23%	
Independent	Charlie Moffett	2,347	0.16%	
N/A	Write-ins	81	0.01%	
Total votes		1,487,130	100%	
Republican gain from Democratic		Swing		

Democratic Party primary results
Party	Candidate	Votes	%
Democratic	Phil Bredesen	426,418	79.05%
Democratic	Randy Nichols	38,322	7.10%
Democratic	Charles E. Smith	34,547	6.40%
Democratic	Charles V. Brown	17,506	3.25%
Democratic	L. Best	16,007	2.97%
Democratic	Floyd R. Conover	6,218	1.15%
Democratic	Write-ins	420	0.08%
Total votes		539,438	100.00%

Tennessee gubernatorial election, 2002
Party	Candidate	Votes	%	±%
Democratic	Phil Bredesen	837,284	50.65%	+21.17%
Republican	Van Hilleary	786,803	47.59%	−21.03%
Independent	Edwin C. Sanders	7,749	0.47%	
Independent	Carl Two Feathers Whitaker	5,308	0.32%	
Independent	John Jay Hooker	4,577	0.28%	
Independent	David Gatchell	2,991	0.18%	
Independent	Gabriel Givens	1,591	0.10%	
Independent	Ray Ledford	1,589	0.10%	
Independent	James E. Herren	1,210	0.07%	
Independent	Charles V. Wilhoit, Jr.	898	0.05%	
Independent	Marivuana Stout Leinoff	645	0.04%	
Independent	Francis E. Waldron	635	0.04%	
Independent	Ronny Simmons	630	0.04%	
Independent	Robert O. Watson	579	0.04%	
Independent	Basil Marceaux	302	0.02%	
Write-ins		376	0.02%	
Majority		50,481	3.05%	−36.10%
Turnout		1,653,167		
Democratic gain from Republican		Swing		

Democratic Party primary results
Party	Candidate	Votes	%
Democratic	Phil Bredesen (incumbent)	393,004	88.50%
Democratic	John Jay Hooker	31,933	7.19%
Democratic	Tim Sevier	11,562	2.60%
Democratic	Walt Ward	7,555	1.70%
Total votes		444,054	100.00%

Tennessee gubernatorial election, 2006
Party	Candidate	Votes	%	±%
Democratic	Phil Bredesen (incumbent)	1,247,491	68.60%	+17.95%
Republican	Jim Bryson	540,853	29.74%	−17.85%
Independent	Carl Two Feathers Whitaker	11,374	0.63%	
Independent	George Banks	7,531	0.41%	
Independent	Charles E. Smith	4,083	0.22%	
Independent	Howard W. Switzer	2,711	0.15%	
Independent	David Gatchell	2,385	0.13%	
Independent	Marivuana Stout Leinoff	2,114	0.12%	
Write-ins		7	0.00%	
Majority		706,638	38.86%	+35.80%
Turnout		1,818,549		
Democratic hold		Swing		

Democratic primary results, Tennessee 2018
Party	Candidate	Votes	%
Democratic	Phil Bredesen	349,718	91.51%
Democratic	Gary Davis	20,170	5.28%
Democratic	John Wolfe Jr.	12,269	3.21%
Total votes		382,157	100.00%

2018 United States Senate election in Tennessee
Party	Candidate	Votes	%	±%
Republican	Marsha Blackburn	1,227,483	54.71%	−10.18%
Democratic	Phil Bredesen	985,450	43.92%	+13.51%
Independent	Trudy Austin	9,455	0.42%	N/A
Independent	Dean Hill	8,717	0.39%	N/A
Independent	Kris L. Todd	5,084	0.23%	N/A
Independent	John Carico	3,398	0.15%	N/A
Independent	Breton Phillips	2,226	0.10%	N/A
Independent	Kevin Lee McCants	1,927	0.09%	N/A
Total votes		2,243,740	100.00%	N/A
Republican hold				

Political offices
Preceded by Bill Boner	Mayor of Nashville; 1991–1999	Succeeded by Bill Purcell
Preceded by Don Sundquist	Governor of Tennessee; 2003–2011	Succeeded by Bill Haslam
Party political offices
Preceded by Ned McWherter	Democratic nominee for Governor of Tennessee; 1994	Succeeded by John Jay Hooker
Preceded by John Jay Hooker	Democratic nominee for Governor of Tennessee; 2002, 2006	Succeeded by Mike McWherter
Preceded by Mark Clayton	Democratic nominee for U.S. Senator from Tennessee (Class 1); 2018	Succeeded by Gloria Johnson
U.S. order of precedence (ceremonial)
Preceded by Martha McSally as Former U.S. Senator	Order of precedence of the United States; Within Tennessee	Succeeded by Bill Haslam as Former Governor
Preceded by Matt Bevin as Former Governor	Order of precedence of the United States; Outside Tennessee	Succeeded by Bill Haslam as Former Governor
