= Andrea Conte =

First Lady of Tennessee from 2003 to 2011

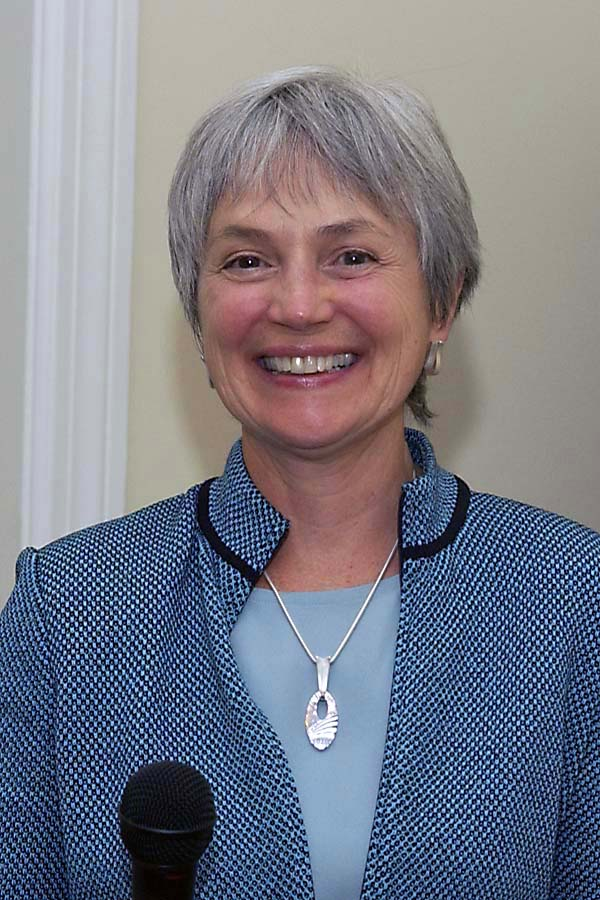

First Lady of Tennessee
- In role January 18, 2003 – January 15, 2011
- Governor: Phil Bredesen
- Preceded by: Martha Sundquist
- Succeeded by: Crissy Haslam

First Lady of Nashville
- In role September 27, 1991 – September 24, 1999
- Preceded by: Betty Boner
- Succeeded by: Debbie Purcell

Personal details
- Born: February 13, 1941 (age 85) Great Barrington, Massachusetts, U.S.
- Spouse: Phil Bredesen (m. 1974)
- Children: Benjamin (b. 1980)
- Education: University of Washington; University of Tennessee downtown Nashville campus
- Occupation: Nurse

Andrea Conte (born February 13, 1941) is an American nurse who served as First Lady of Tennessee from 2003 to 2011 as the wife of former Tennessee Governor Phil Bredesen.

== Early history and education ==
Andrea Conte was born in Great Barrington, Massachusetts, to Louis and Roaslie Conte. She spent her childhood in Great Barrington, graduating from Searles High School in 1958. She trained as a nurse at Mercy Hospital in Springfield, MA, receiving her RN in 1961 and subsequently her bachelor's degree in nursing from the University of Washington in Seattle in 1968. After moving to Nashville, she attended night classes at the Tennessee State University - Avon Williams campus and received an M.B.A degree in 1983.

== Marriage and family ==
Andrea Conte and Philip Bredesen were married in Wheatley, Oxfordshire, England on November 22, 1974. Bredesen was working in the United Kingdom at the time. She has retained her own name. Following their marriage, she obtained a job with Hospital Corporation of America in Nashville, TN, and the couple moved to Tennessee in 1975. They have one son, Benjamin (b. 1980).

== Kidnapping ==
On December 7, 1988, she was kidnapped and injured in the parking lot of her retail shop in Nashville. She fought, and was able to escape the kidnapper's car as it drove on the road.

== Activities as First Lady ==
As first lady, she continued her work on victims' rights issues, a commitment that arose from her 1988 kidnapping. In 2004, she walked 605 miles across Tennessee (from Memphis to Bristol) to spotlight and raise funds for child advocacy centers in her state. She is a frequent speaker on these and other subjects, both in and outside of Tennessee.

She also headed a project to restore and renovate the Tennessee Governor's Residence. The renovation includes a subterranean addition built underneath the Residence's front lawn called Conservation Hall, designed by the Memphis architecture firm archimania.
