= Archimania =

Archimania is a collective of architects and designers in the South Main Historic Arts District of downtown Memphis, Tennessee. The collective was founded in 1995 and is led by Todd Walker, FAIA, and Barry Alan Yoakum, FAIA.

== Honors and awards ==
The design collective has garnered more than 160 AIA awards, dominating recent local and statewide architecture awards' programs. They won the architectural design competition for Conservation Hall at the Tennessee Governor's Mansion, and Architectural Digest recognized this project as one of "10 Amazing Examples of Subterranean Architecture."

Archimania's design for Memphis Teacher Residency has received a Chicago Athenaeum, American Architecture Award, an AIA/CAE Education Facility Design Award, an Architizer A+ Special Mention, and an Architect's Newspaper, 2017 Best of Interior - Workplace Design Award. Other Archimania projects receiving Chicago Athenaeum, American Architecture Awards include Woodard Residence and Redeemer Presbyterian Church. Archimania's design for Ballet Memphis also received an AIA/CAE Education Facility Design Award, as well as a Metal Architecture Design Award for Natural Metals, and was an Architizer A+ Awards Finalist.

Two of Archimania's projects, Garden Chapel Pavilion and Redeemer Presbyterian Church, won International AIA Religious Art and Architecture Design Awards/IFRAA, with one being an Honor Award. Garden Chapel Pavilion was recognized as a 2018 World Architecture News (WAN) award finalist; Hattiloo Theatre and Memphis Botanic Garden - Live at the Garden were recognized as 2016 World Architecture News award finalists.

Archimania was ranked 8th in design in the United States, according to Architect Magazine's annual Top 50 ranking in 2017.

== Leaders in sustainability ==
Archimania designed the state of Tennessee's first Net-Zero building, a $3.2 Million welcome centre that opened in July 2017. The collective is designing a net-zero office by retrofitting two mid-century office buildings. Construction has also begun on a net-zero case study house called civitas, which has been instrumental in allowing the Archimania team to demonstrate to clients their knowledge about net-zero, and its viability in Memphis.

Archimania designed the first LEED for Homes residence in Tennessee designed and owned by an architect. They have also designed Leadership in Energy and Environmental Design (LEED) Silver and Gold certified buildings per USGBC's criteria. One of the primary goals of Archimania's LEED Gold certified Conservation Hall project, at the Tennessee Governor's Mansion (spearheaded by First Lady Andrea Conte), was to encourage energy-efficient operation and minimize its environmental impact.

"Civitas was selected for defining the New Domestic Landscape through innovation." as part of Future House Awards by Global Design News and The Chicago Athenaeum: Museum of Architecture and Design and as announced in the inaugural group of 2022 new, groundbreaking, and cutting-edge private houses... The jury was led by Flavio Manzoni, Chief Design Officer | Senior Vice President of Ferrari Design, Ferrari SpA.
