= Maple Bluff, Wisconsin =

- Village
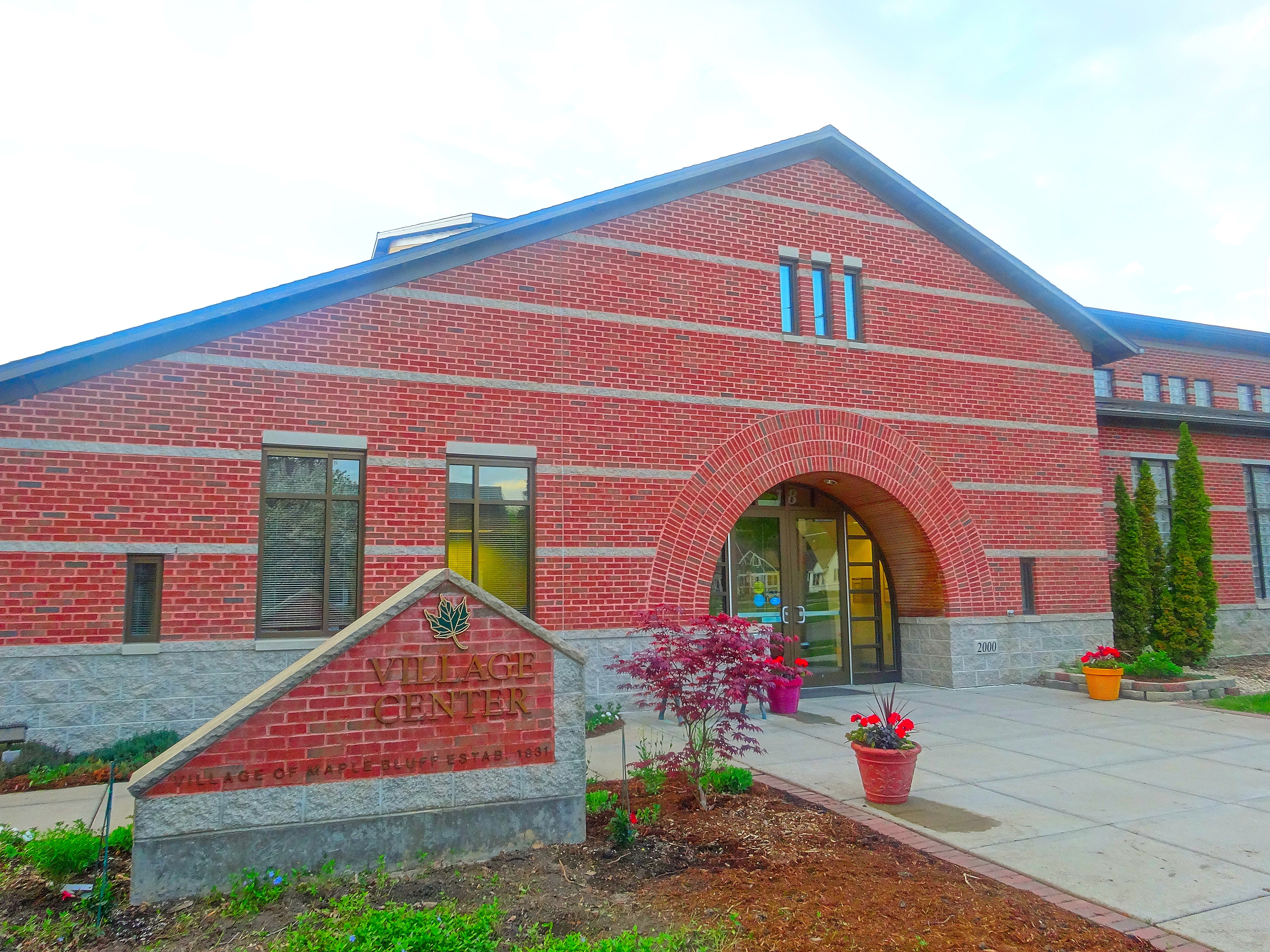
- Maple Bluff Village Center

- Location of Maple Bluff in Dane County, Wisconsin.
- Coordinates: 43°6′39″N 89°22′6″W
- Country: United States
- State: Wisconsin
- County: Dane

Area
  - Total: 0.70 sq mi (1.82 km^{2})
  - Land: 0.70 sq mi (1.82 km^{2})
  - Water: 0 sq mi (0.00 km^{2})
- Elevation: 876 ft (267 m)

Population (2020)
  - Total: 1,368
  - Density: 1,950/sq mi (752/km^{2})
- Time zone: UTC-6 (Central (CST))
  - Summer (DST): UTC-5 (CDT)
- Area code: 608
- FIPS code: 55-48750
- GNIS feature ID: 1568959
- Website: www.villageofmaplebluff.com

Maple Bluff is a village in Dane County, Wisconsin, United States. The population was 1,368 at the 2020 census. It is a suburb of Madison located on the eastern shore of Lake Mendota and is part of the Madison metropolitan area. Maple Bluff is the site of the Wisconsin Governor's Mansion, the residence of the governor of Wisconsin and their family. The Robert M. La Follette House is also in Maple Bluff.

== Geography ==
Maple Bluff is located at 43°6′39″N 89°22′6″W (43.110945, -89.368263).

According to the United States Census Bureau, the village has a total area of 0.69 square miles (1.79 km^{2}), all land.

== Demographics ==
Historical population
Census	Pop.	Note	%±
1940	862		—
1950	1,361		57.9%
1960	1,565		15.0%
1970	1,974		26.1%
1980	1,351		−31.6%
1990	1,352		0.1%
2000	1,358		0.4%
2010	1,313		−3.3%
2020	1,368		4.2%
U.S. Decennial Census

=== 2010 census ===
As of the census of 2010, there were 1,313 people, 547 households, and 401 families living in the village. The population density was 1,902.9 inhabitants per square mile (734.7/km^{2}). There were 592 housing units at an average density of 858.0 per square mile (331.3/km^{2}). The racial makeup of the village was 95.9% White, 1.1% African American, 0.3% Native American, 0.8% Asian, 0.5% from other races, and 1.4% from two or more races. Hispanic or Latino of any race were 1.4% of the population.

There were 681 households, of which 29.1% had children under the age of 18 living with them, 67.5% were married couples living together, 3.5% had a female householder with no husband present, 2.4% had a male householder with no wife present, and 26.7% were non-families. 20.5% of all households were made up of individuals, and 6.5% had someone living alone who was 65 years of age or older. The average household size was 2.40 and the average family size was 2.79.

The median age in the village was 48 years. 22.3% of residents were under the age of 18; 3.2% were between the ages of 18 and 24; 19.3% were from 25 to 44; 38.8% were from 45 to 64; and 16.4% were 65 years of age or older. The gender makeup of the village was 49.4% male and 50.6% female.

=== 2000 census ===
As of the census of 2000, there were 1,358 people, 541 households, and 407 families living in the village. The population density was 1,944.1 people per square mile (749.0/km^{2}). There were 557 housing units, at an average density of 797.4 per square mile (307.2/km^{2}). The racial makeup of the village was 97.13% White, 1.33% African American, 0.22% Native American, 0.37% Asian, 0.29% from other races, and 0.66% from two or more races. Hispanic or Latino of any race were 0.66% of the population.

There were 541 households, out of which 31.4% had children under the age of 18 living with them, 69.7% were married couples living together, 4.3% had a female householder with no husband present, and 24.6% were non-families. 19.0% of all households were made up of individuals, and 9.1% had someone living alone who was 65 years of age or older. The average household size was 2.51 and the average family size was 2.88.

In the village, the population was spread out, with 24.0% under the age of 18, 4.3% from 18 to 24, 22.2% from 25 to 44, 31.6% from 45 to 64, and 17.9% who were 65 years of age or older. The median age was 45 years. For every 100 females, there were 93.2 males. For every 100 females age 18 and over, there were 91.5 males.

The median income for a household in the village was $111,400, and the median income for a family was $129,961. Males had a median income of $83,074 versus $50,000 for females. The per capita income for the village was $66,380. About 1.7% of families and 2.5% of the population were below the poverty line, including 1.2% of those under age 18 and 2.1% of those age 65 or over.

== Government ==
Maple Bluff is served by the Maple Bluff Police Department. The Maple Bluff Fire Rescue Department provides fire protection and emergency medical services to the village.

== Notable people ==
- Connie Carpenter-Phinney, Olympic speed skater, Olympic gold medal winner in road cycling
- Thomas E. Coleman, chairman of the Republican Party of Wisconsin
- Chris Farley, comedian, actor, Saturday Night Live alumnus
- Jim Montgomery, Olympic gold medal winner in swimming
- Bradley Whitford, actor
- Jane Wiedlin, rhythm guitarist of The Go-Go's, actress
- Thornton Wilder, Pulitzer Prize-winning author and playwright
- Jerry Kelly, pro golfer
