= Radnor Lake State Natural Area =

State Natural Area in Davidson County, Tennessee

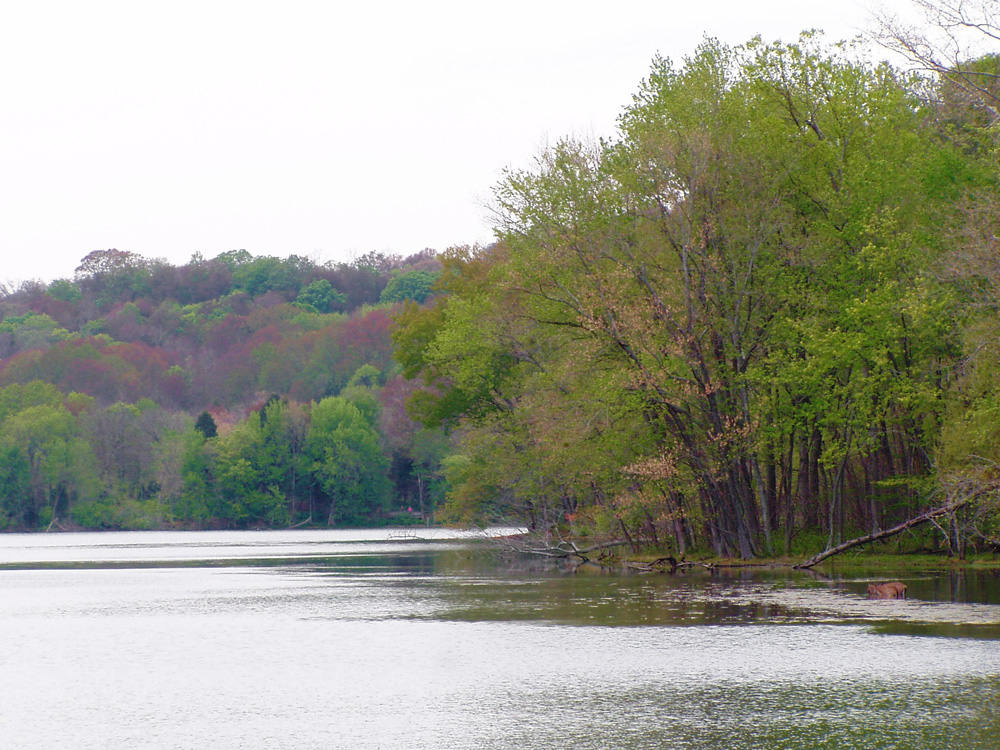
- Radnor Lake
- Interactive map of Radnor Lake State Natural Area
- Type: Tennessee State Park
- Location: Oak Hill, Davidson County, Tennessee
- Coordinates: 36°03′43″N 86°48′27″W
- Area: 1,332 acres (5.39 km^{2})
- Created: 1973
- Operator: TDEC
- Website: Official website

Radnor Lake State Natural Area, also known as Radnor Lake State Park, is a popular state natural area and state park in Oak Hill, Tennessee within Nashville. The 1,368 acres (5.54 km^{2}) nature preserve has five miles of unpaved trails wander through the woods surrounding the lake. Otter Creek Road runs through the middle of the park and is now closed to traffic. Visitors to Radnor Lake enjoy wildlife native to Middle Tennessee, including river otters, beavers, mink, muskrat, wild turkey, bald eagle, bobcat, coyote and the white-tailed deer. There is a visitor center open Thursday through Monday.

== History ==
Radnor Lake was created by the Louisville and Nashville Railroad Company in 1914, and was initially used for watering steam locomotives and supplying the watering pens for shipped livestock. Afterwards, it became a local sportsman's club for L & N executives and guests. Efforts to preserve the Radnor Lake area began in 1923 when the executive vice president of L&N Railroad declared the site a "Wildlife Sanctuary" at the request of the Tennessee Ornithological Society. Executives with the railroad and their friends (The Sportsman's Club) used the sanctuary for fishing, but a reverence for the beauty of the area was present even then among L&N families and neighbors who lived in the surrounding hills. In 1962, the property was sold to be developed but initial work proved to be problematic and public pressure influenced the state to purchase the property in 1973 and create the State's first Natural Area.

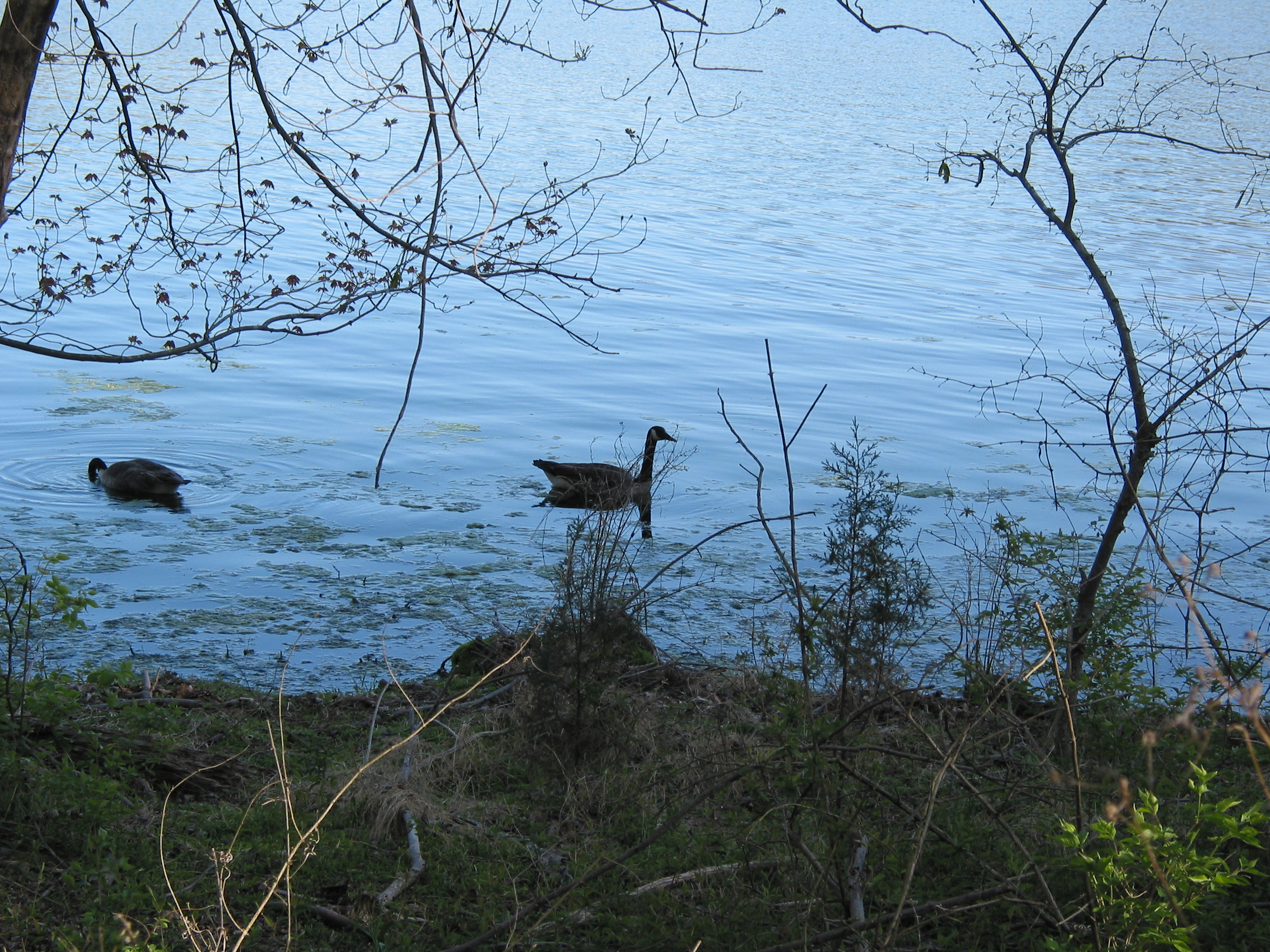
Geese are some of the wildlife found in the park.

Any hunting within the natural area is illegal.

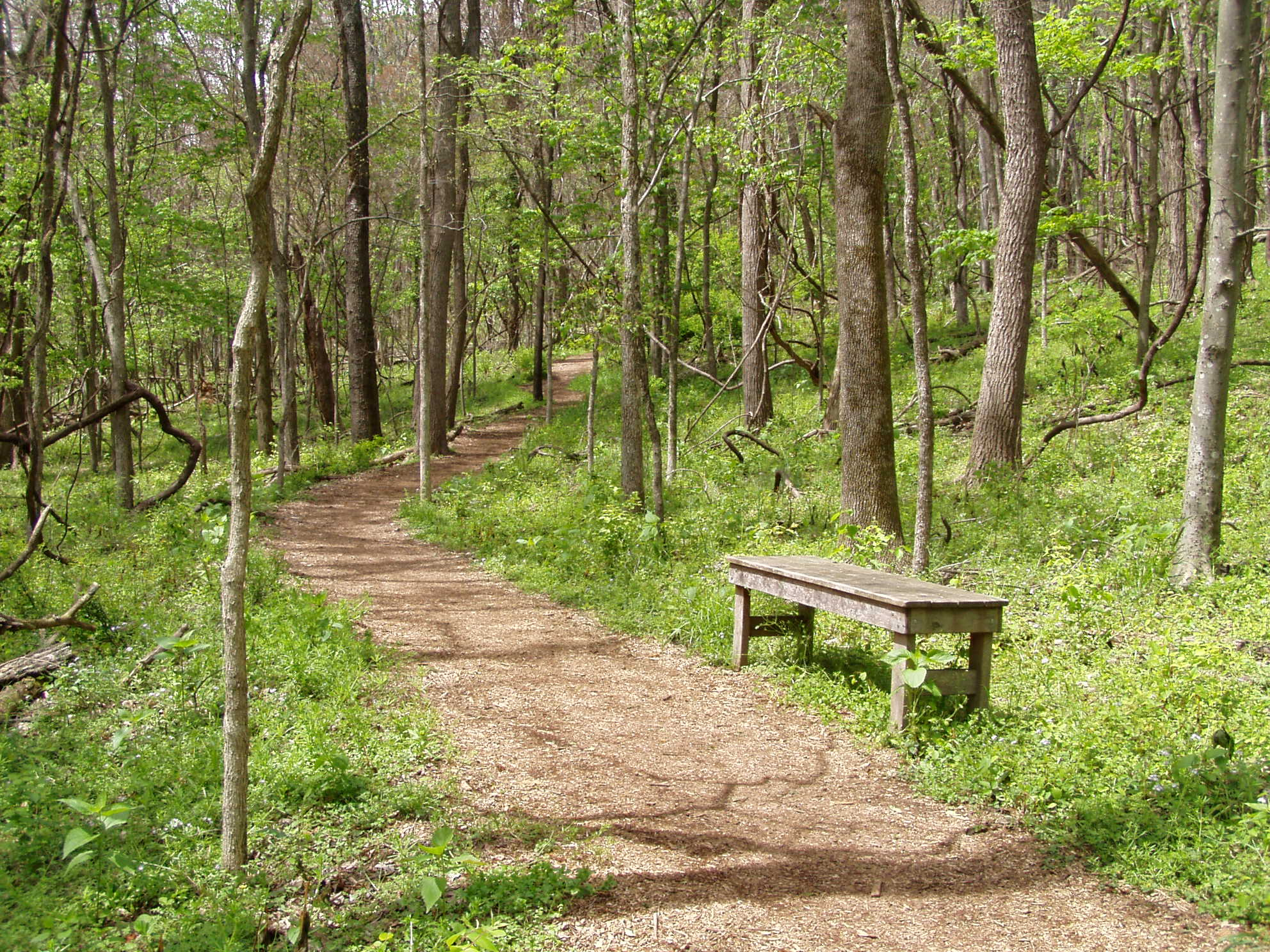
Several hiking trails run through the hills surrounding the lake.

Radnor Lake State Natural Area is a Class II State Natural Area, meaning it is a day use area only, and there is no camping or picnicking allowed.

== Activities ==
=== Hiking ===
Radnor Lake has several miles of hiking trails, featuring varying difficulty levels.

=== Visitor Center ===
In the entrance to Radnor Lake, there is a visitor center that contains artwork and other exhibits on display. It also has a map of the entire lake.

=== Birding ===
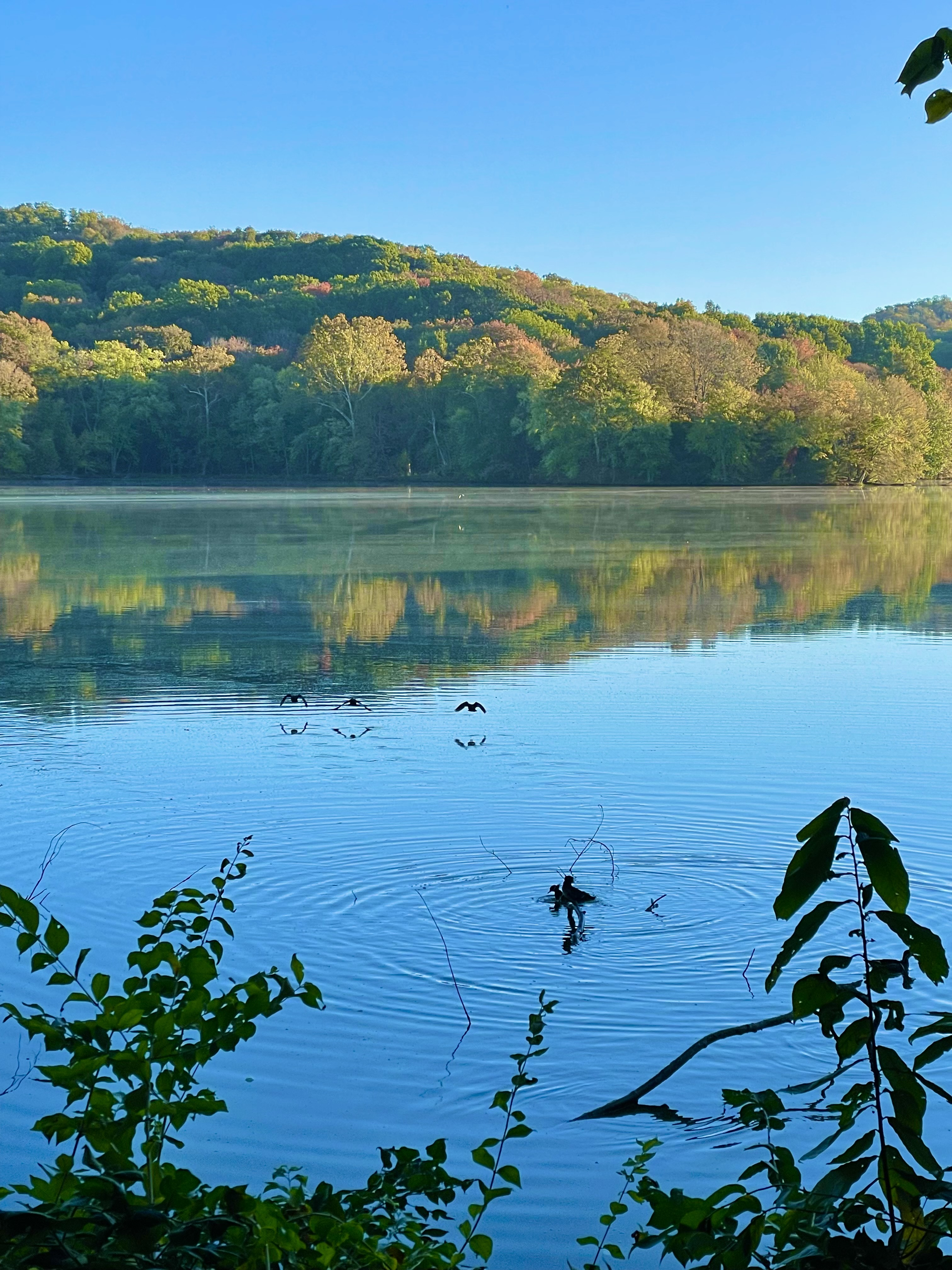
Radnor Lake in early fall

Many waterfowl and transients can be found in the park, including several duck species, such as ring-necked duck, canvasback, gadwall and American wigeon. In addition, the Barbara J. Mapp Aviary Education Center is home to injured-non releasable birds, including a great horned owl, red-tailed hawk, black vulture, golden eagle, and bald eagles.
