= Oak Hill, Tennessee =

Oak Hill
- City
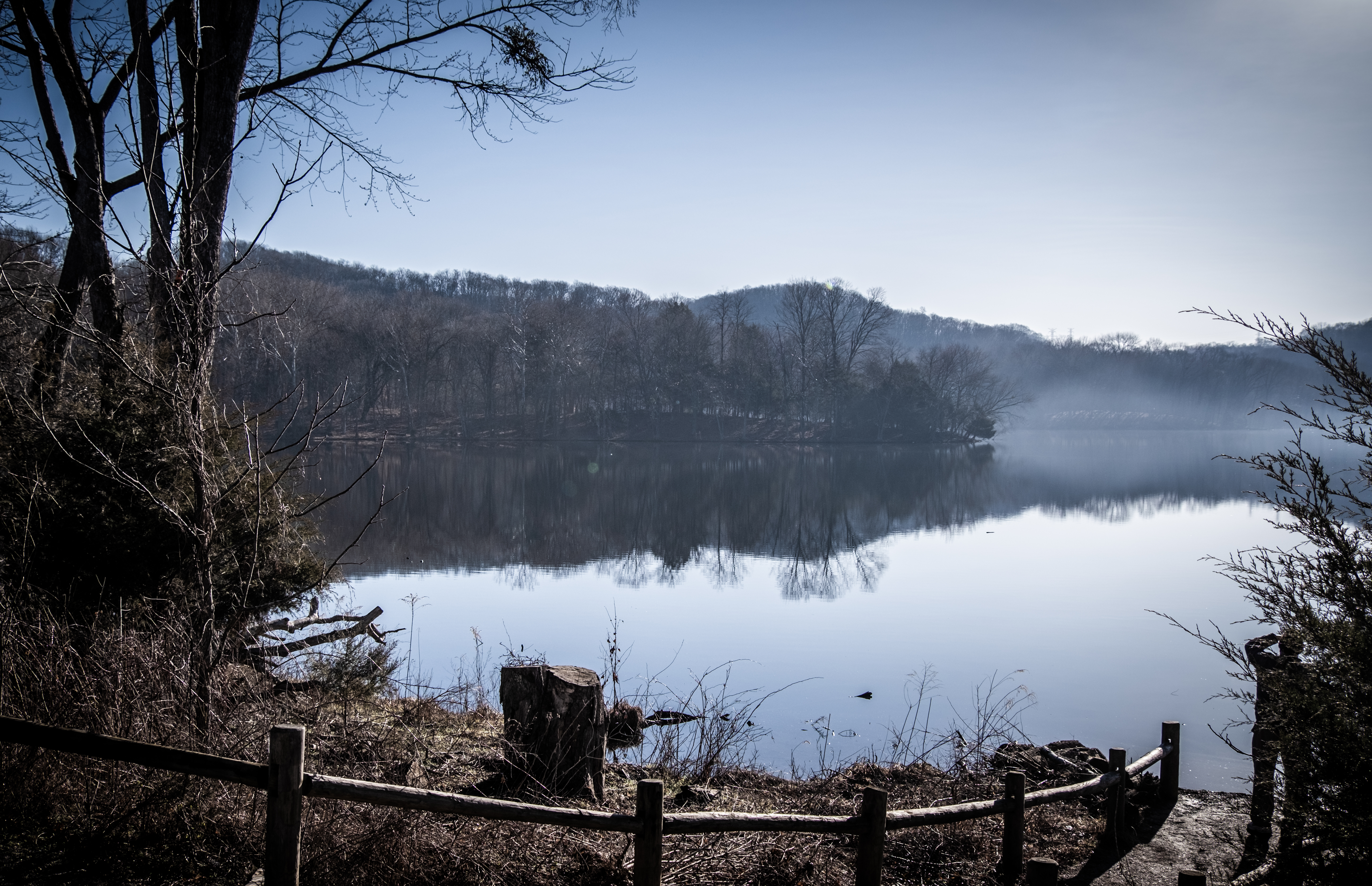
- Radnor Lake in Oak Hill

- Location of Oak Hill in Davidson County, Tennessee.
- Coordinates: 36°05′16″N 86°46′59″W
- Country: United States
- State: Tennessee
- County: Davidson
- Incorporated: 1952

Government
  - Type: Mayor-commission government
  - Mayor: Dale Grimes

Area
  - Total: 7.96 sq mi (20.61 km^{2})
  - Land: 7.85 sq mi (20.32 km^{2})
  - Water: 0.11 sq mi (0.29 km^{2})
- Elevation: 581 ft (177 m)

Population (2020)
  - Total: 4,891
  - Density: 623.5/sq mi (240.73/km^{2})
- Time zone: UTC-6 (Central (CST))
  - Summer (DST): UTC-5 (CDT)
- Postal code: 37220
- FIPS code: 47-54780
- GNIS feature ID: 1296134
- Website: www.oakhilltn.us

Oak Hill is a city in Davidson County, Tennessee. As of the 2020 census, Oak Hill had a population of 4,891. The Tennessee Governor's Mansion is located in the city. Although the city is administered under the Metropolitan Government of Nashville and Davidson County, it retains its own municipal government.

== History ==
During the 1790s, Judge John Overton established a horse-breeding farm at Oak Hill known as Travellers Rest. After World War II Oak Hill, like other Nashville neighborhoods, saw an increase of new residents and homes being built. Oak Hill incorporated as a city in 1952, just before the governments of Davidson County and Nashville merged.

== Geography ==
According to the United States Census Bureau, the city has a total area of 8.0 square miles (20.6 km^{2}), of which 7.8 square miles (20.3 km^{2}) is land and 0.12 square miles (0.3 km^{2}), or 1.50%, is water.

== Demographics ==
Historical population
| Census | Pop. | Note | %± |
|---|---|---|---|
| 1960 | 4,490 | | — |
| 1970 | 4,645 | | 3.5% |
| 1980 | 4,609 | | −0.8% |
| 1990 | 4,301 | | −6.7% |
| 2000 | 4,493 | | 4.5% |
| 2010 | 4,529 | | 0.8% |
| 2020 | 4,891 | | 8.0% |

=== 2020 census ===
As of the 2020 census, Oak Hill had a population of 4,891. The median age was 44.0 years. 24.5% of residents were under the age of 18 and 21.2% of residents were 65 years of age or older. For every 100 females there were 96.7 males, and for every 100 females age 18 and over there were 92.9 males age 18 and over.

72.6% of residents lived in urban areas, while 27.4% lived in rural areas.

There were 1,764 households in Oak Hill, of which 37.6% had children under the age of 18 living in them. Of all households, 73.1% were married-couple households, 8.6% were households with a male householder and no spouse or partner present, and 15.5% were households with a female householder and no spouse or partner present. About 15.2% of all households were made up of individuals and 9.0% had someone living alone who was 65 years of age or older.

There were 1,874 housing units, of which 5.9% were vacant. The homeowner vacancy rate was 0.6% and the rental vacancy rate was 7.7%.

Racial composition as of the 2020 census
| Race | Number | Percent |
|---|---|---|
| White | 4,520 | 92.4% |
| Black or African American | 59 | 1.2% |
| American Indian and Alaska Native | 5 | 0.1% |
| Asian | 82 | 1.7% |
| Native Hawaiian and Other Pacific Islander | 0 | 0.0% |
| Some other race | 34 | 0.7% |
| Two or more races | 191 | 3.9% |
| Hispanic or Latino (of any race) | 137 | 2.8% |

=== 2000 census ===
As of the 2000 census, there was a population of 4,493, with 1,816 households and 1,367 families residing in the city. The population density was 570.4 inhabitants per square mile (220.2/km^{2}). There were 1,894 housing units at an average density of 240.5 per square mile (92.9/km^{2}). The racial makeup of the city was 96.26% White, 0.98% African American, 0.11% Native American, 1.65% Asian, 0.02% Pacific Islander, 0.27% from other races, and 0.71% from two or more races. Hispanic or Latino of any race were 0.76% of the population.

There were 1,816 households, out of which 30.8% had children under the age of 18 living with them, 68.3% were married couples living together, 5.6% had a female householder with no husband present, and 24.7% were non-families. 20.6% of all households were made up of individuals, and 10.6% had someone living alone who was 65 years of age or older. The average household size was 2.47 and the average family size was 2.88.

In the city, the population was spread out, with 22.7% under the age of 18, 4.0% from 18 to 24, 23.2% from 25 to 44, 32.0% from 45 to 64, and 18.2% who were 65 years of age or older. The median age was 45 years. For every 100 females, there were 95.3 males. For every 100 females age 18 and over, there were 92.0 males.

The median income for a household in the city was $90,174, and the median income for a family was $104,952. Males had a median income of $70,963 versus $42,500 for females. The per capita income for the city was $58,932, the fourth highest in the state. None of the families and 1.2% of the population were living below the poverty line, including no under eighteens and 1.8% of those over 64.

== Government and politics ==
=== Government ===
The city’s governing body consists of an elected Mayor and Board of Commissioners. Elections are nonpartisan and held in November of even-numbered years. Commissioners collaborate with the mayor and vice mayor to establish local policy and municipal governance.

Dale Grimes serves as Mayor.

=== Political makeup ===
Oak Hill is a competitive swing city in statewide elections.

Oak Hill Presidential election results
| Year | Republican | Democratic | Third parties |
|---|---|---|---|
| 2024 | 50.36% 1,530 | 47.47% 1,442 | 2.17% 66 |
| 2020 | 50.89% 1,485 | 46.92% 1,369 | 2.19% 64 |
| 2016 | 47.21% 1,303 | 45.91% 1,267 | 6.88% 190 |

== Recreation ==
The majority of Radnor Lake State Park is located in Oak Hill.

== Landmarks ==
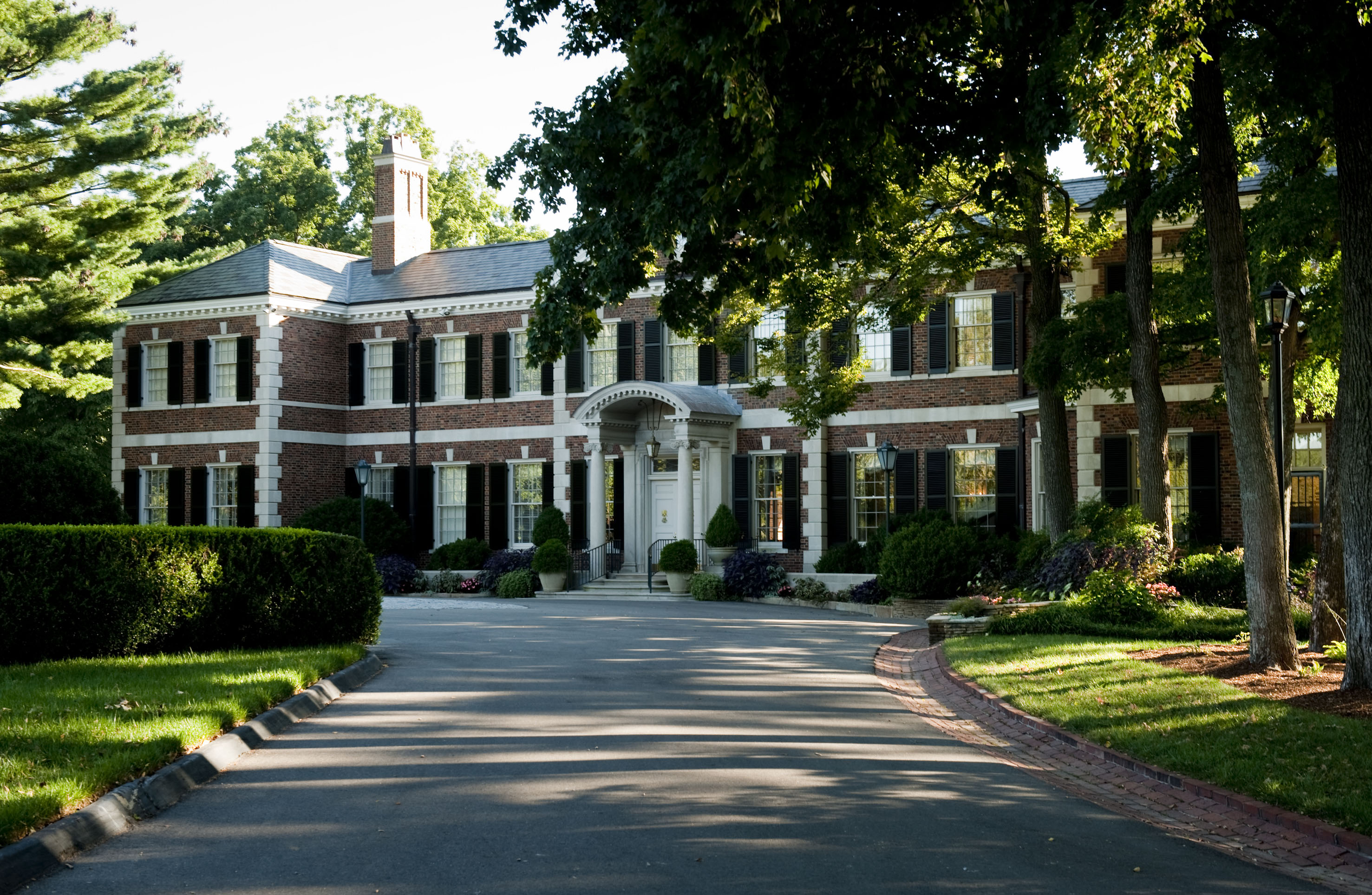
The Tennessee Governor's Mansion, an Oak Hill landmark

The Tennessee Governor's Mansion is in Oak Hill.

== Education ==
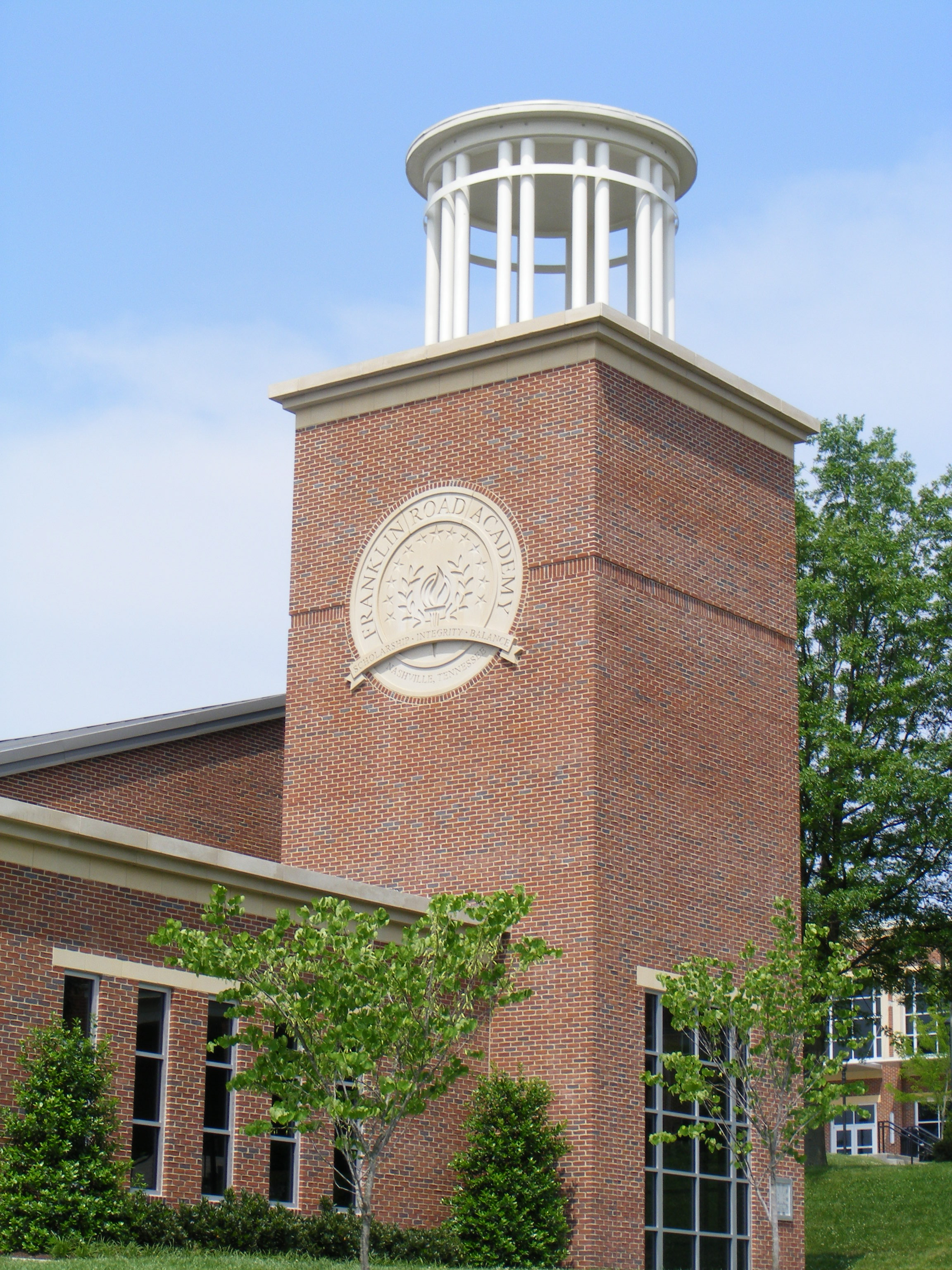
Franklin Road Academy in Oak Hill.

It is within Metro Nashville Public Schools.

There are two public schools and three private schools in the city limits. Public schools include Glendale Elementary School, and John Overton High School.

Private schools include Father Ryan High School of the Roman Catholic Diocese of Nashville, Franklin Road Academy, Oak Hill School, and Benton Hall Academy.
