= McWhorter =

McWhorter or MacWhorter is a surname. Notable people with the surname include:

- Alexander MacWhorter (1734–1807), American clergyman
- Alexander MacWhorter III (1822–1880), American theologian and author
- Bob McWhorter (1891–1960), American football player
- C.K. McWhorter (1989– ), American businessman and philanthropist
- Diane McWhorter (born 1952), American historian and journalist
- George McWhorter (1833–1891), American politician from Florida
- George McWhorter (Wisconsin politician) (1793–1867)
- Hamilton McWhorter III (1921-2008), American naval aviator
- Henry C. McWhorter (1836–1913), American politician from West Virginia
- John McWhorter (born 1965), American linguist and political commentator
- Keith MacWhorter (born 1955), American baseball player
- Lucullus Virgil McWhorter (1860–1944), American farmer and archaeologist
- Robert McWhorter (1819-1908), American politician from Georgia
- R. Clayton McWhorter (1933–2016), American businessman
- William A. McWhorter (1918–1944), American soldier
- Zach McWhorter (born 1999), American pole vaulter

== See also ==
- The McWhorter School of Pharmacy
- McWhorter, West Virginia
- McWhorter, Georgia
- Justice McWhorter (disambiguation)
- William Hamilton McWhorter Jordan
