= Battle of Leyte =

1944 World War II battle

- Part of the Philippines campaign (1944–1945) of the Pacific Theater of World War II
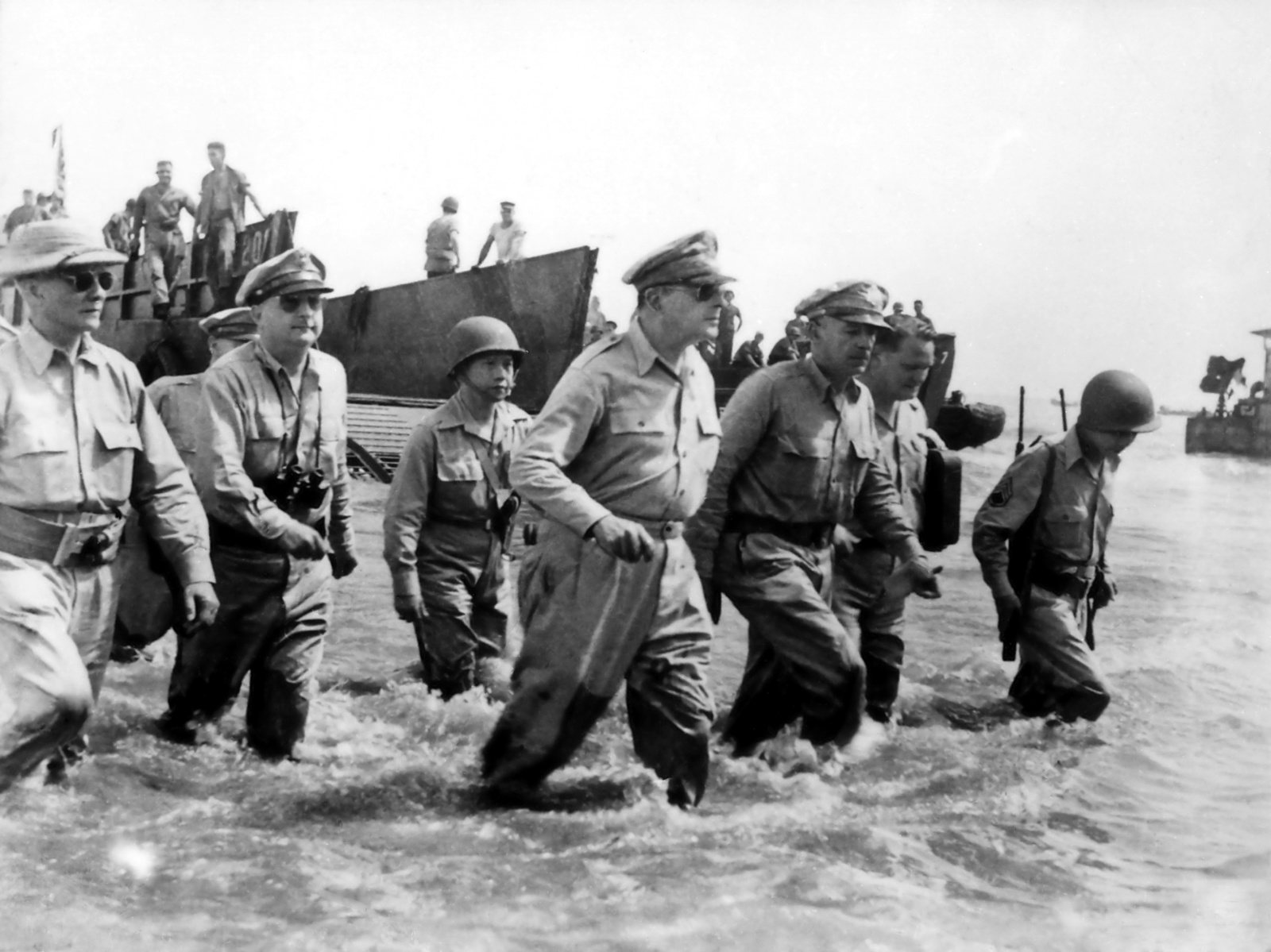
- General Douglas MacArthur and staff, accompanied by Philippine president Sergio Osmeña (left), land at Red Beach, Leyte, 20 October 1944.
Date	17 October – 26 December 1944 (initial phase involving Sixth Army); Guerrilla phase under Eighth Army continued until March 1945
Location	Leyte Island, Philippines 11°10′20″N 125°00′44″E
Result	Allied victory

Belligerents
United States: Commonwealth of the Philippines; Australia (Note: Royal Australian Navy vessels, and Royal Australian Air Force flying and ground units attached to US commands.)	Japan: Republic of the Philippines

Commanders and leaders
Army: (United States) Douglas MacArthur (United States) Walter Krueger (United States) Franklin C. Sibert (United States) John R. Hodge; Navy: (United States) Thomas C. Kinkaid; Army Air Force: (United States) George C. Kenney; Civilian Government: (Commonwealth of the Philippines) Sergio Osmeña; Guerrillas: (Commonwealth of the Philippines) Ruperto Kangleón	(Empire of Japan) Hisaichi Terauchi (Empire of Japan) Tomoyuki Yamashita (Empire of Japan) Sōsaku Suzuki (Empire of Japan) Shiro Makino ‡‡

Units involved
Ground elements: (United States) Sixth Army (final phase): X Corps; XXIV Corps; (United States) Eighth Army (final phase) Aerial elements: (United States) Fifth Air Force Naval elements: (United States) Seventh Fleet: UDT 8, UDT 9	(Empire of Japan) Fourteenth Area Army: 35th Army

Strength
(United States) Sixth Army: ≈200,000 (United States) Air and naval forces: ≈120,000 (Commonwealth of the Philippines) 3,000 guerrillas	(Empire of Japan) 70,100 (including reinforcements); 246 artillery pieces 33 mortars 37–41 tanks

Casualties and losses
Battle casualties: 3,504 killed 11,991 wounded 183 missing Non-battle casualties (after 25 Oct.): 119 dead 6 missing 36,791 sick/other (Note: M. Hamlin Cannon lists the following battle casualties: 3,504 killed, 11,991 wounded, and 89 missing. Cannon's source material, the Sixth and Eighth Army after-action reports, provide slightly higher numbers for soldiers missing in action.)	65,000 dead (Note: Most Japanese died from starvation and disease rather than from combat causes; up to 80% of total deaths during the Philippines campaign.); 714–828 captured (Note: Sixth Army reported capturing 389 Japanese while Eighth Army captured 439. Eighth Army's After Action lists 275 captured by the Sixth Army.)

The Battle of Leyte (Filipino: Labanan sa Leyte; Waray: Gubat ha Leyte; Japanese: レイテの戦い) in the Pacific campaign of World War II was the amphibious invasion of the island of Leyte in the Philippines by American forces and Filipino guerrillas under the overall command of General Douglas MacArthur. The combined forces fought against the Imperial Japanese Army in the Philippines led by General Tomoyuki Yamashita. The operation, codenamed King Two, launched the Philippines campaign of 1944–45 for the recapture and liberation of the entire Philippine Archipelago and to end almost three years of Japanese occupation.

== Background ==
Japan had conquered the Philippines in 1942. Controlling it was vital for Japan's survival in World War II because it secured sea routes to Borneo and Sumatra in which rubber and petroleum were shipped to Japan.

For the U.S., capturing the Philippines was a key strategic step in isolating Imperial Japan's military holdings in China and the Pacific theater. It was also a personal matter of pride for MacArthur. In 1942, just a month before Japan forced the surrender of all USAFFE forces in the Philippines, U.S. President Franklin D. Roosevelt had ordered MacArthur to leave the Philippines and organize the U.S. forces gathering in Australia, which were meant to relieve the USAFFE. Those relief forces were non-existent; Roosevelt's true intentions in ordering MacArthur to flee the Philippines had been to prevent his capture by the Japanese. Still, MacArthur had vowed that he would return to the Philippines. He repeatedly stated that it was a moral obligation of the U.S. to liberate the Philippines as soon as possible. In March 1944, the Joint Chiefs of Staff ordered MacArthur to plan an attack on the southern Philippines by the end of the year, and Luzon in early 1945. In July 1944, Roosevelt met with MacArthur and Chester Nimitz in Hawaii, where the decision was made to invade the Philippines, from which land air bases could be used for the Pacific Theater of Operations.

Over the summer of 1944, planes from the aircraft carriers of the U.S. 3rd Fleet under Admiral William F. Halsey carried out several successful missions over the Philippines and found weak Japanese resistance. Halsey then recommended a direct strike on Leyte, canceling other planned operations, and the Leyte invasion date moved forward to October.

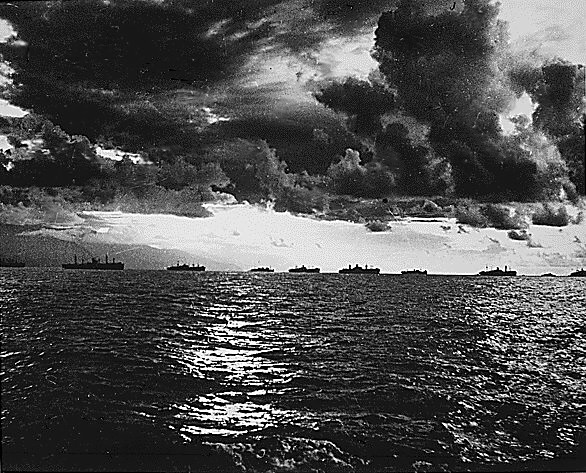
Amphibious forces approach Leyte, October 1944

Leyte, facing the Pacific Ocean, has numerous deep-water approaches and sandy beaches which offered opportunities for amphibious assaults and fast resupply. The roads extend inland with Highway 1, that runs for 40 mi (64 km) along the east coast between Abuyog town to the north and the San Juanico Strait between Leyte and Samar Islands, providing avenues for tank-infantry operations, as well as suitable ground for airfield construction. American air forces based on Leyte could strike at enemy bases and airfields anywhere in the Philippines.

A heavily forested mountain range dominates the interior and separates two plains. The larger Leyte Valley extends from the northern coast to the long eastern shore and contains most of the towns and roadways on the island. The other, Ormoc Valley, situated on the west side, was connected to Leyte Valley by Highway 2 running from Palo town on the east coast, then west and then south through Leyte Valley to Ormoc bay, then along the western shore to Baybay. The road then turned east to cross the mountainous interior and connected it with Highway 1 on the east coast at Abuyog. South of these towns, the mountainous southern third of Leyte was mostly undeveloped. High mountain peaks over 4,400 ft (1,300 m), as well as the jagged karst formations of the island offered formidable defensive opportunities. The timing late in the year forced combat troops and supporting pilots, as well as logistical units, to contend with monsoon rains.

Leyte's population of over 900,000 people—mostly farmers and fishermen—could be expected to assist an American invasion, since many residents already supported the guerrilla struggle against the Japanese. Japanese troop strength on Leyte was estimated by U.S. intelligence at 20,000; mostly of the 16th Division under Lieutenant General Shiro Makino.

== Commanders and units ==
Theatre commander

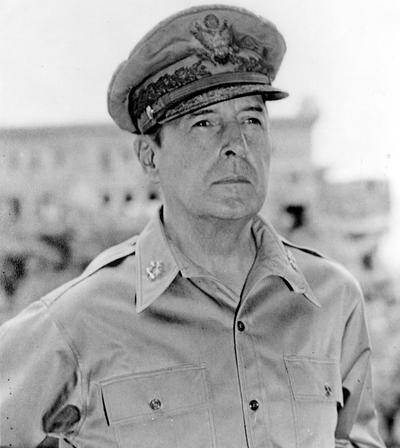
Gen. Douglas MacArthur

Ground, naval and air force commanders
for the recapture of the Philippines

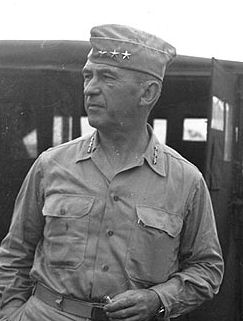
Lt. Gen. Walter Krueger

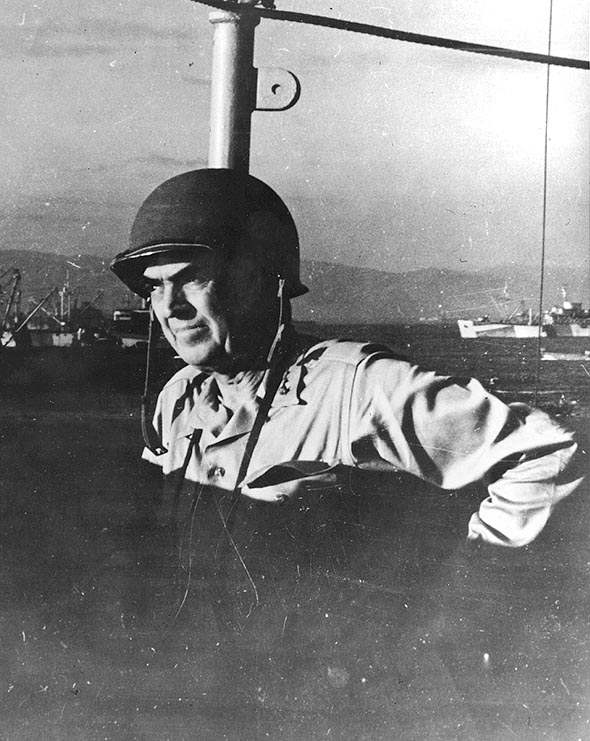
Vice Adm. Thomas C. Kinkaid

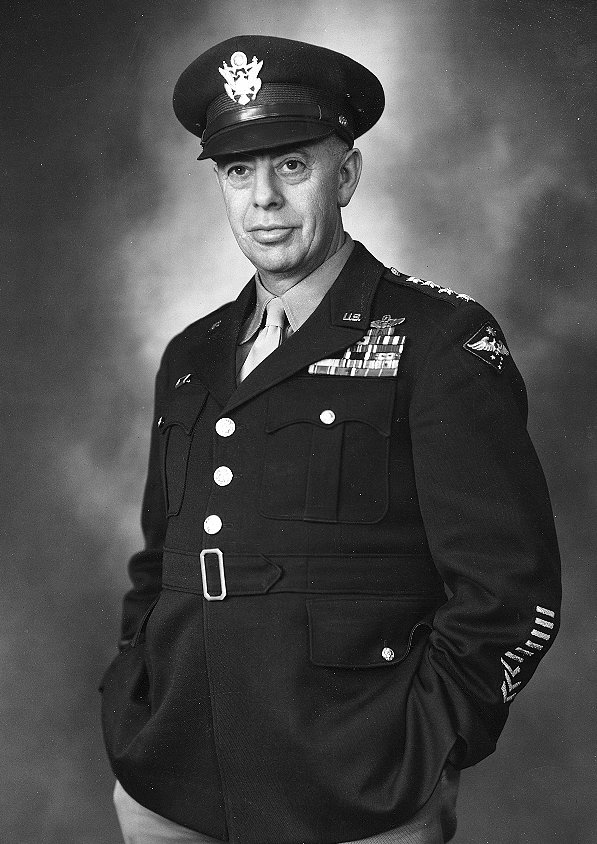
Lt. Gen. George C. Kenney

=== United States ===
Southwest Pacific Area
General Douglas MacArthur in light cruiser Nashville

==== Ground forces ====
US Sixth Army
Lieutenant General Walter Krueger
Approx. 202,500 total officers and enlisted

Northern landing area

X Army Corps
Lieutenant General Franklin C. Sibert

Left: 24th Infantry ("Taro") Division
Right: 1st Cavalry Division

Southern landing area

XXIV Army Corps
Lieutenant General John R. Hodge

Left: 7th Infantry ("Bayonet") Division
Right: 96th Infantry ("Deadeye") Division
Reserve: 11th Airborne ("Angels") Division

Reserves

Landed 14 Nov: 32nd Infantry ("Red Arrow") Division
Landed 23 Nov: 77th Infantry ("Statue of Liberty") Division

==== Naval and air forces ====
US Seventh Fleet
Vice Admiral Thomas C. Kinkaid in amphibious command ship Wasatch

Central Philippines Attack Force (Task Force 77)
Vice Admiral Kinkaid

Northern Attack Force (Task Force 78)
Rear Admiral Daniel E. Barbey in amphibious command ship Blue Ridge

Embarking Maj. Gen. Franklin C. Sibert's X Army Corps

Southern Attack Force (Task Force 79)
Vice Admiral Theodore S. Wilkinson in amphibious command ship Mount Olympus

Embarking Maj. Gen. John R. Hodge's XXIV Army Corps

Allied Air Forces
Lieutenant General George C. Kenney, USAAF

Fifth Air Force
Thirteenth Air Force

=== Japan ===
Japanese commanders concerned in Leyte campaign

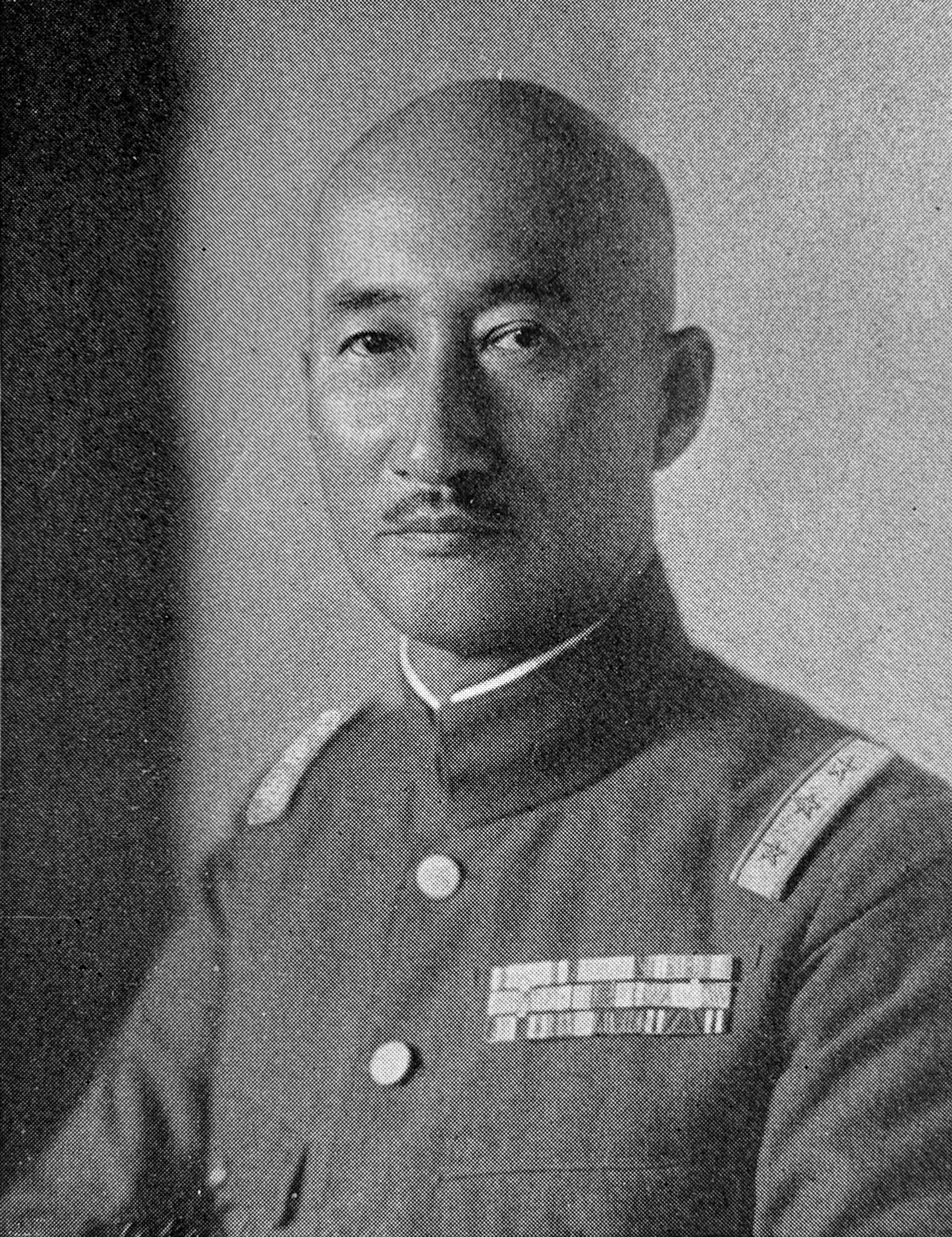
Count Hisaichi Terauchi

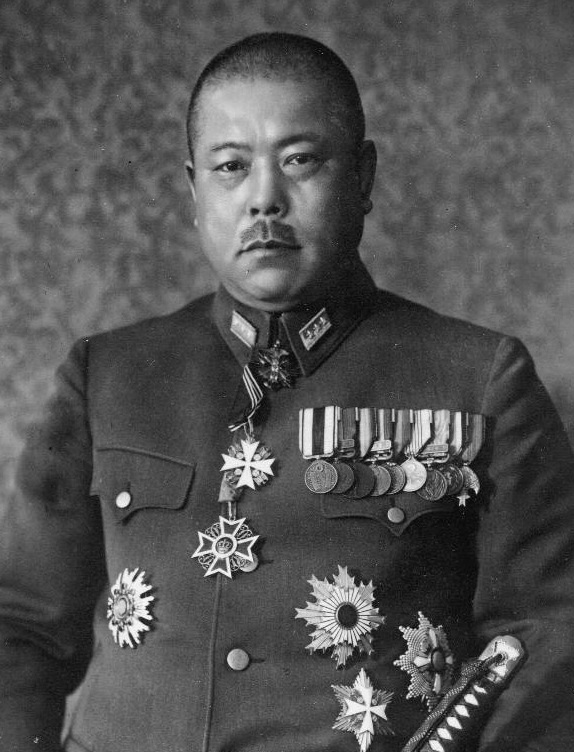
General Tomoyuki Yamashita

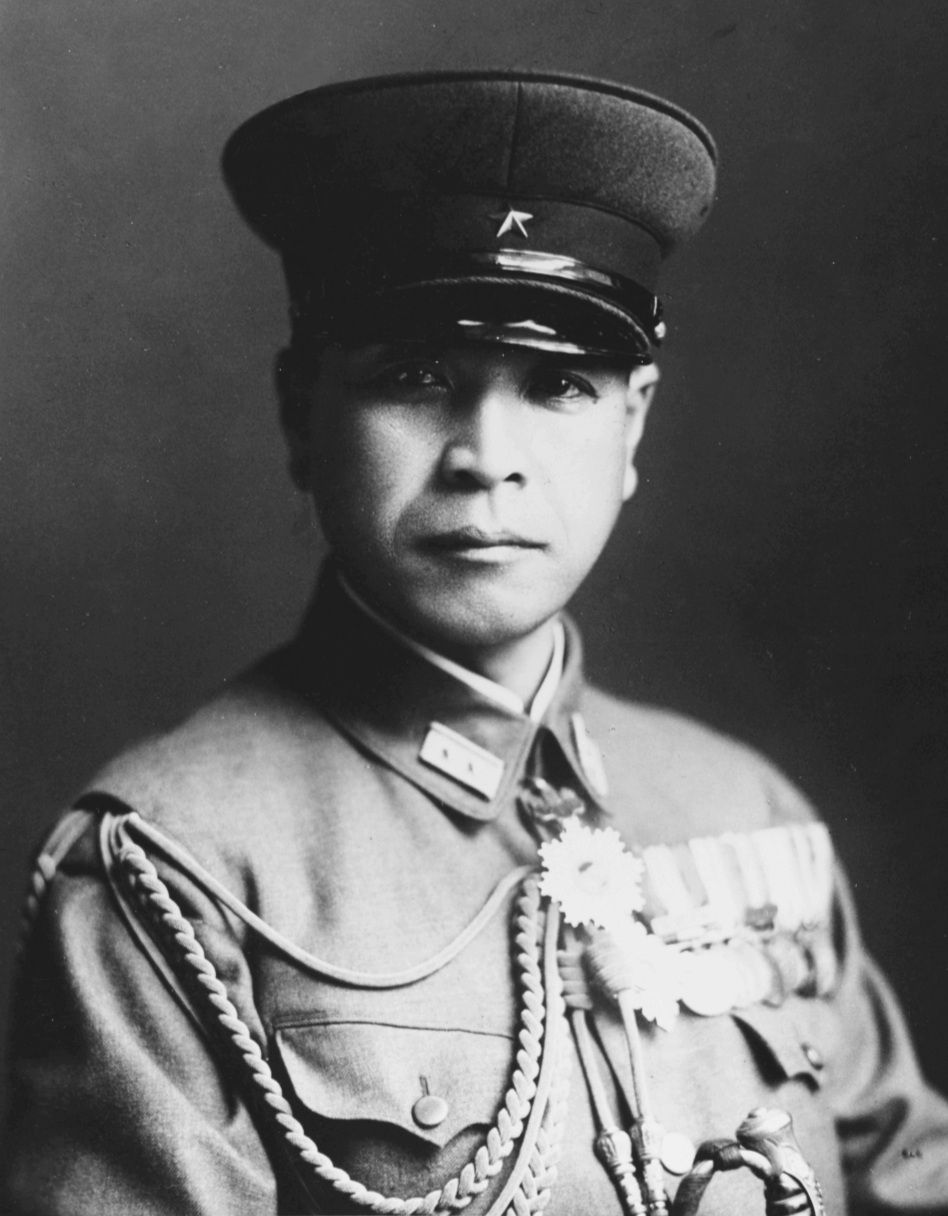
Lieut. Gen. Sosaku Suzuki

Southern Army (Southeast Asia)
Field Marshal Count Hisaichi Terauchi (Note: Died before he could be tried for war crimes) at Manila

Fourteenth Area Army (Note: A Japanese area army was equivalent to a Euro-American army.)
General Tomoyuki Yamashita (Note: Hanged for atrocities committed by men under his command)

Thirty-Fifth Army (Note: A Japanese army was equivalent to a Euro-American corps.)
Lieutenant General Sosaku Suzuki (Note: KIA on Cebu 19 April 1945)

Leyte Defense Forces

16th Division
Lieutenant General Shiro Makino (Note: Committed suicide 10 August 1945)

Air Forces

Fourth Air Army at Manila
IJN Fifth Base Air Force under on Formosa

== Battle ==
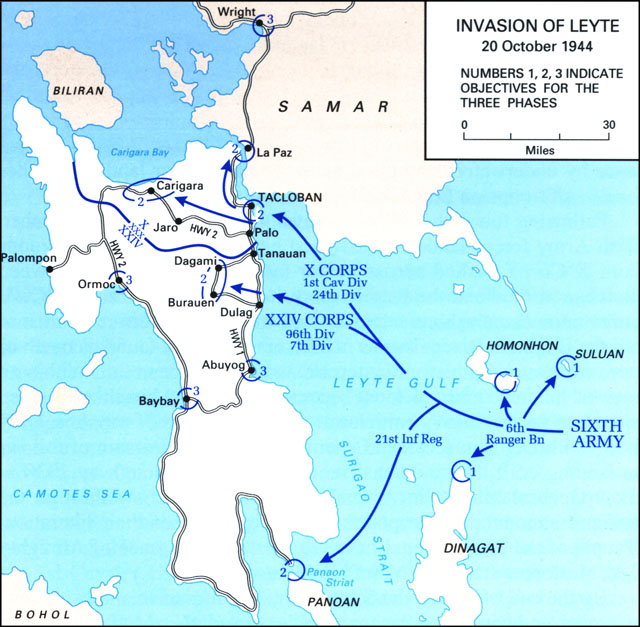
Invasion of Leyte Map, 20 October 1944

=== Landings ===
Preliminary operations for the Leyte invasion began at dawn on 17 October 1944, with minesweeping tasks and the movement of the 6th Rangers toward three small islands in Leyte Gulf. Although delayed by a storm, the Rangers were on Suluan and Dinagat islands by 08:05 am. On Suluan, they dispersed a small group of Japanese defenders and destroyed a radio station, while they found Dinagat unoccupied. The third island, Homonhon, was taken without any opposition the next day. On Dinagat and Homonhon, the Rangers proceeded to erect navigation lights for the amphibious transports to follow. Meanwhile, reconnaissance by underwater demolition teams revealed clear landing beaches for assault troops on Leyte. Independently, the 21st Infantry Regiment on 20 October landed on Panaon Strait to control the entrance to Sogod Bay.

Following four hours of heavy naval gunfire on A-day, 20 October, Sixth Army forces landed on assigned beaches at 10:00. X Corps pushed across a 4 mi (6.4 km) stretch of beach between Tacloban airfield and the Palo River. 15 mi (24 km) to the south, XXIV Corps units came ashore across a 3 mi (4.8 km) strand between San José and the Daguitan River. Troops found as much resistance from swampy terrain as from Japanese fire. Within an hour of landing, units in most sectors had secured beachheads deep enough to receive heavy vehicles and large amounts of supplies. Only in the 24th Division sector did enemy fire force a diversion of follow-up landing craft. But even then the sector was secure enough by 13:30 to allow Gen. MacArthur to make his dramatic entrance through the shore onto Red Beach and announce to the populace the beginning of their liberation: "People of the Philippines, I have returned! By the grace of Almighty God, our forces stand again on Philippine soil."

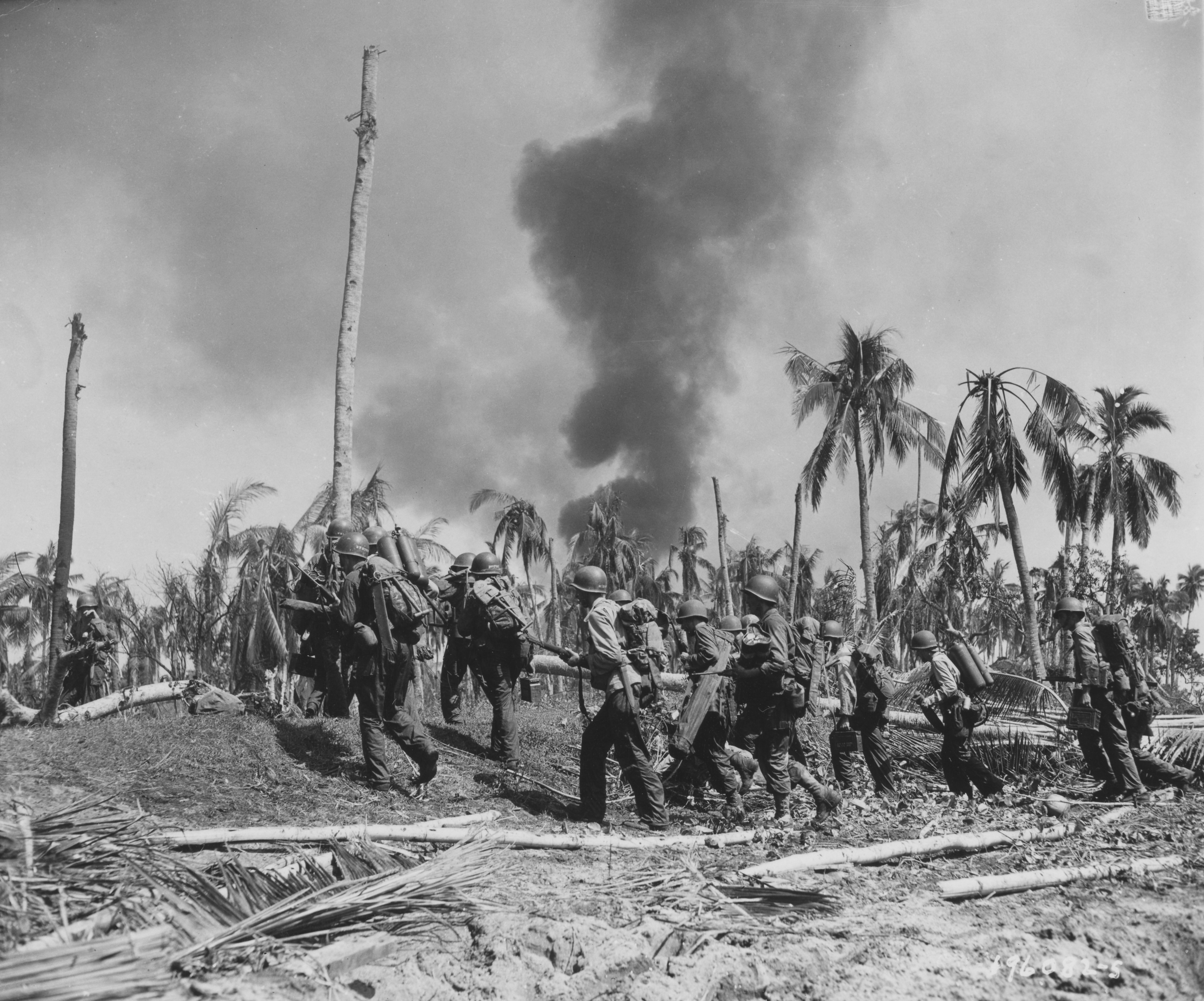
Troops of the 12th Cavalry moving inland from the beach on Leyte. 20 October 1944.

By the end of A-day, the Sixth Army had moved 1 mi (1.6 km) inland and five miles wide. In the X Corps sector, the 1st Cavalry Division held Tacloban airfield, and the 24th Infantry Division had taken the high ground on Hill 522 commanding its beachheads. In the XXIV Corps sector, the 96th Infantry Division held the approaches to Catmon Hill, and the 7th Infantry Division held Dulag and its airfield.

General Makino spent the day moving his command post from Tacloban, 10 mi (16 km) inland to the town of Dagami. The initial fighting was won at a cost of 49 killed, 192 wounded, and six missing. The Japanese counterattacked the 24th Infantry Division on Red Beach through the night, unsuccessfully.

=== Campaign in the Leyte Valley ===
The Sixth Army made steady progress inland against sporadic and uncoordinated enemy resistance on Leyte in the next few days. The 1st Cavalry Division of Maj. Gen. Verne D. Mudge secured the provincial capital, Tacloban, on 21 October, and Hill 215 the next. On 23 October, Gen. MacArthur presided over a ceremony to restore civil government to Leyte. 1st and 2nd Cavalry Brigades initiated a holding action to prevent a Japanese counterattack from the mountainous interior, after which the 1st Cavalry was allowed to move on. The 8th Cavalry established itself on Samar by 24 Oct, securing the San Juanico Strait.

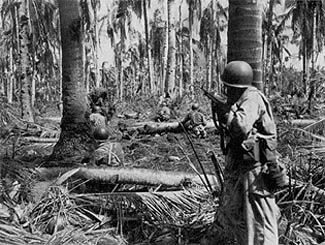
US infantrymen move cautiously toward a machinegun nest

On the X Corps left, the 24th Infantry Division under Maj. Gen. Frederick A. Irving, drove inland into heavy enemy resistance. After days and nights of hard fighting and killing some 800 Japanese, the 19th and 34th Infantry Regiments expanded their beachhead and took control of the high ground commanding the entrance to the northern Leyte Valley. By 1 November, after a seven-day tank-infantry advance supported by artillery fire, both regiments had pushed through Leyte Valley and were within sight of the north coast and the port of Carigara, which the 2nd Cavalry Brigade occupied the next day after Suzuki ordered a withdrawal. In its drive through Leyte Valley, the 24th Division inflicted nearly 3,000 enemy casualties. These advances left only one major port on Leyte—Ormoc City on the west coast—under Japanese control.

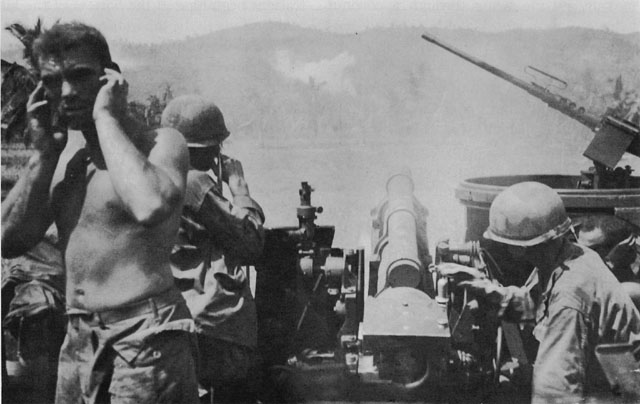
A US 105 mm (4.1 in) howitzer cannon of M7 Priest fires at Catmon Hill

From the XXIV Corps beachhead Gen. Hodge had sent his two divisions into the southern Leyte Valley, which already contained four airfields and a large supply center. Maj. Gen. James L. Bradley's 96th Infantry Division was to clear Catmon Hill, a 1,400 ft (430 m) promontory, the highest point in both corps beachheads, and used by the Japanese as an observation and firing post to fire on landing craft approaching the beach on A-day. Under cover of incessant artillery and naval gunfire, Bradley's troops made their way through the swamps south and west of the high ground at Labiranan Head. After a three-day fight, the 382nd Infantry Regiment took a key Japanese supply base at Tabontabon, 5 mi (8.0 km) inland, and killed some 350 Japanese on 28 October. Simultaneously two battalions each from the 381st Infantry Regiment and 383rd Infantry Regiments slowly advanced up opposite sides of Catmon Hill and battled the fierce Japanese resistance. When the mop-up of Catmon Hill was completed on 31 October, the Americans had cleared 53 pillboxes, 17 caves, and several heavy artillery positions.

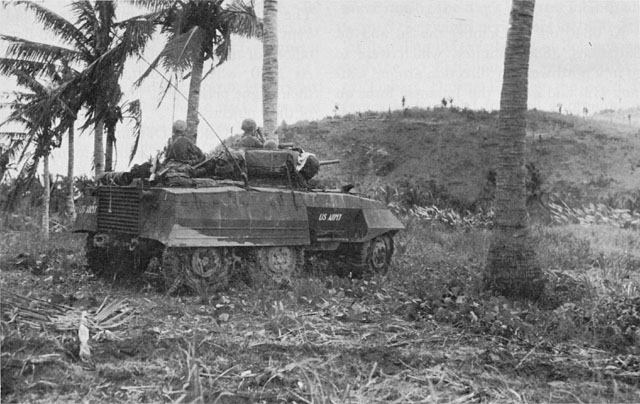
US armored car at Labiranan Head

On the left of XXIV Corps, the 7th Infantry Division under Maj. Gen. Archibald V. Arnold moved inland against the Japanese airfields of San Pablo 1 and 2, Bayug, and Buri, using "flying wedges" of American tanks, the 767th Tank Battalion, which cleared the way for the infantrymen. Between Burauen and Julita, the 17th Infantry overcame fanatical but futile resistance from Japanese soldiers concealed in spider holes, who placed satchel charges on the hulls of the American tanks. A mile north, 32nd Infantry soldiers killed more than 400 Japanese at Buri airfield. While two battalions of the 184th Infantry patrolled the corps' left flank, the 17th Infantry, with the 184th's 2nd Battalion attached, turned north toward Dagami, 6 mi (9.7 km) above Burauen. Using flamethrowers to root the enemy out of pillboxes and a cemetery, US troops captured Dagami on 30 October, which forced Gen. Makino to evacuate his command post further westward. Meanwhile, on 29 October, the 32nd Infantry's 2nd Battalion, preceded by the 7th Cavalry Reconnaissance Troop, moved 15 mi (24 km) south along the east coast to Abuyog for a probe of the area, and then over the next four days patrolled west through the mountains to Baybay, all without opposition.

=== Japanese counterattacks ===
With 432,000 Japanese soldiers in the Philippines, General Yamashita decided to make Leyte the main effort of the Japanese defense, and on 21 October, ordered the 35th Army to coordinate a decisive battle with the Imperial Japanese Navy. The 16th Division was to be reinforced by the 30th Infantry Division from Mindanao, landing on Ormoc Bay. The 102nd Infantry Division would occupy Jaro, where the 1st and 26th Infantry Divisions were concentrating. Battalions from the 55th and 57th Independent Mixed Brigades were on Leyte by 25 Oct.

As the Sixth Army pushed deeper into Leyte, the Japanese struck back in the air and at sea. On 24 October, some 200 enemy aircraft approached American beachheads and shipping from the north. Fifty American land-based aircraft rose to intercept them, and claimed to have shot down between 66 and 84 of the attackers. Day and night air raids continued over the next four days, damaging supply dumps ashore and threatening American shipping. But by 28 October, counterattacks by US aircraft on Japanese airfields and shipping on other islands so reduced enemy air strength that conventional air raids ceased to be a major threat. As their air strength diminished, the Japanese resorted to the deadly kamikazes, a corps of suicide pilots who crashed their bomb-laden planes directly into US ships. They chose the large American transport and escort fleet that had gathered in Leyte Gulf on A-day as their first target and sank one escort carrier, the USS St. Lo, on 25 October 1944 and badly damaged many other vessels. This was the first instance of a major warship to be sunk by kamikaze attack.

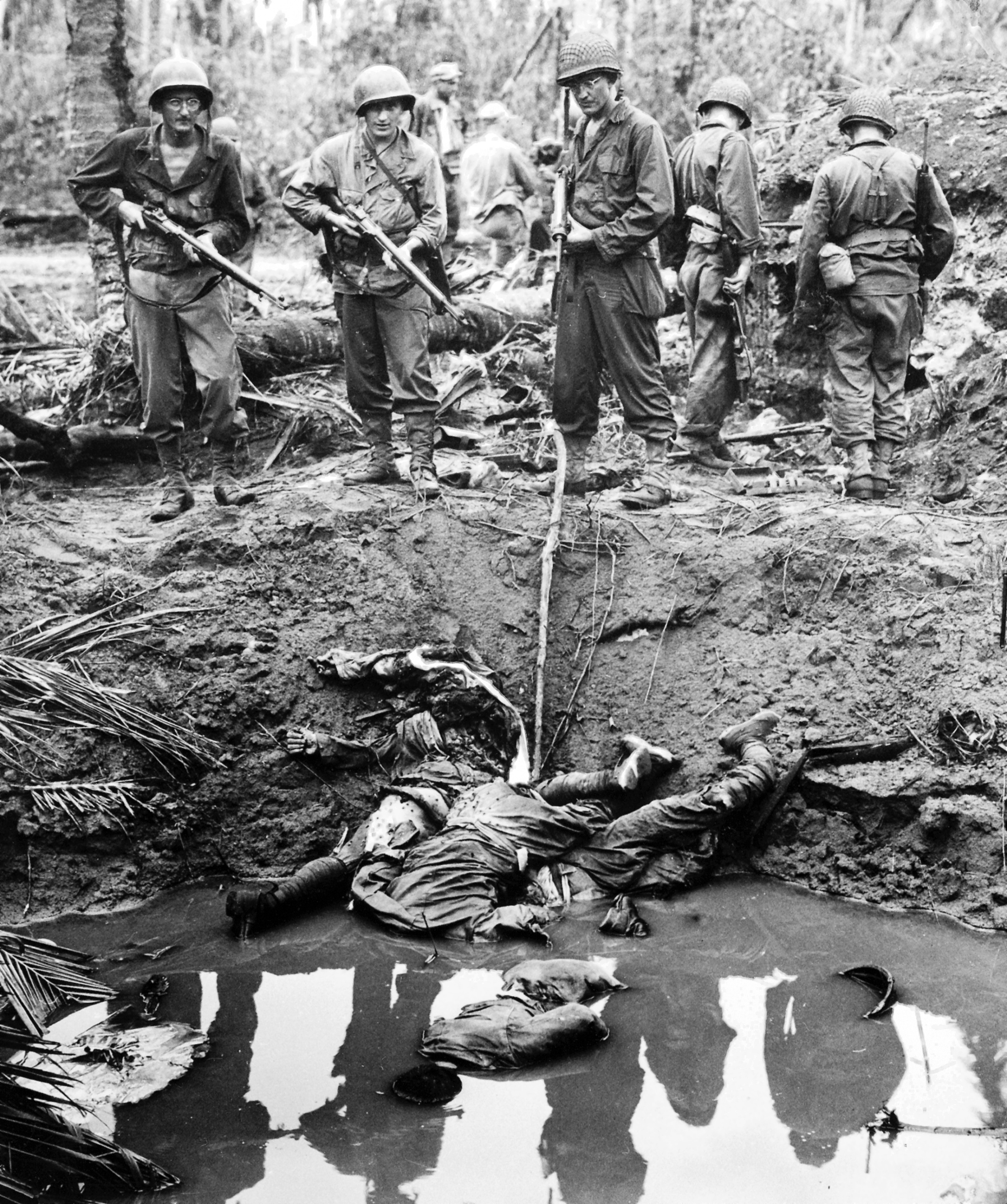
Four Japanese snipers shot and killed in the muddy water of a bomb crater

A more serious danger to the US forces developed at sea. The Imperial Japanese Navy's high command decided to destroy US Navy forces supporting the Sixth Army by committing its entire remaining surface fleet to a decisive battle with the Americans. The Imperial Navy's plan was to attack in three major task groups. One, which included four aircraft carriers with few aircraft aboard, was to act as a decoy, luring the US 3rd Fleet north away from Leyte Gulf.

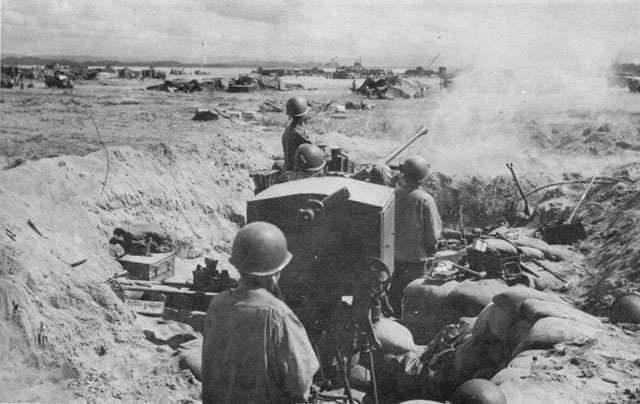
A US anti-aircraft gun at Tacloban airfield in action

On 23 October, the approach of the enemy surface vessels was detected. US naval units moved out to intercept, and the air and naval Battle of Leyte Gulf—the largest naval battle in the Pacific and also one of the largest naval battles in history—was fought from 23 to 26 October—the Japanese suffered a decisive defeat. Nonetheless, by 11 December, the Japanese had succeeded in moving more than 34,000 troops to Leyte and over 10,000 short tons (9,100 t) of material, most through the port of Ormoc on the west coast, despite heavy losses to reinforcement convoys, including engagements at Ormoc Bay, because of relentless air interdiction missions by US aircraft.

=== Advance towards the Ormoc Valley ===
The Japanese reinforcement presented severe problems for both Krueger and MacArthur. Instead of projected mopping up operations after clearing the east side of Leyte, the Sixth Army had to prepare for extended combat in the mountains on its western side.

Gen. Krueger planned a giant pincer operation to clear Ormoc Vally, with X Corps forces moving south, and XXIV Corps units pushing north from Baybay. To overcome the expected increased resistance, especially in the mountain barrier to the north, Krueger mobilized his reserve forces, the 32nd and 77th Infantry Divisions, while MacArthur activated the 11th Airborne Division. The 21st RCT pulled out from the Panaon area to rejoin the 24th Division and were replaced by a battalion of the 32nd Infantry. On 3 November, the 34th Infantry Regiment moved out from west of Carigara to sweep the rest of the northern coast before turning south into the mountains. The 1st Battalion soon came under attack from a ridge along the highway. Supported by the 63rd Field Artillery Battalion, the unit cleared the ridge, and the 34th Infantry continued unopposed that night through the town of Pinamopoan, recovering numerous heavy weapons abandoned by the enemy, then halted at the point where Highway 2 turns south into the mountains.

=== Battles of Breakneck and Kilay Ridges ===
On the 7th of November the 21st Infantry went into its first sustained combat on Leyte when it moved into the mountains along Highway 2, near Carigara Bay. The fresh regiment, with the 19th Infantry's 3rd Battalion attached, immediately ran into strong defenses of the newly arrived Japanese 1st Division, aligned from east to west across the road and anchored on a network of fighting positions built of heavy logs and interconnecting trench lines and countless spider holes, which became known as "Breakneck Ridge" to the Americans, or the "Yamashita Line" to the Japanese. General Krueger ordered the 1st Cavalry to join the 24th Infantry Division in the attack south, and the X and XXIV Corps (96th Infantry Division) to block routes through the central mountain range, anticipating General Suzuki's renewed attack with the arrival of his 26th Infantry Division. Additionally the XXIV Corps had the 7th Infantry Division in Baybay. Plus, Krueger had access to the 32nd and 77th Infantry Divisions, and the 11th Airborne Division, which MacArthur was staging in Leyte in preparation of the Luzon invasion.

A typhoon began on 8 November, and the heavy rain that followed for several days further impeded American progress. Despite the storm and high winds, which added falling trees and mud slides to enemy defenses and delayed supply trains, the 21st Infantry continued its slow and halting attack, with companies often having to withdraw and recapture hills that had been taken earlier. The Americans seized the approaches to Hill 1525 2 mi (3.2 km) to the east, enabling Irving to stretch out the enemy defenses further across a 4 mi (6.4 km) front along Highway 2.

On the east, the 19th Infantry's 2nd Battalion, under Lt. Col. Robert B. Spragins, swung east around Hill 1525 behind the enemy right flank, cutting back to Highway 2, 3 mi (4.8 km) south of 'Breakneck Ridge', blocking the Japanese supply line. On the west, Irving sent the 34th Infantry's 1st Battalion under Lt. Col. Thomas E. Clifford, over water from the Carigara area to a point 2 mi (3.2 km) west of the southward turn of Highway 2, and moved it inland. This amphibious maneuver was made in eighteen LVTs of the 727th Amphibian Tractor Battalion. After crossing a ridge line and the Leyte River, they approached the enemy left flank at 900 ft (270 m) on Kilay Ridge, the highest terrain behind the main battle area. Both battalions reached positions only about 1,000 yd (910 m) apart on opposite sides of the highway by 13 November despite strong opposition and heavy rains. The Americans were aided by the 1st Battalion, 96th Philippine Infantry, a local guide who "owned" Kilay Ridge, and Filipinos carrying supplies.

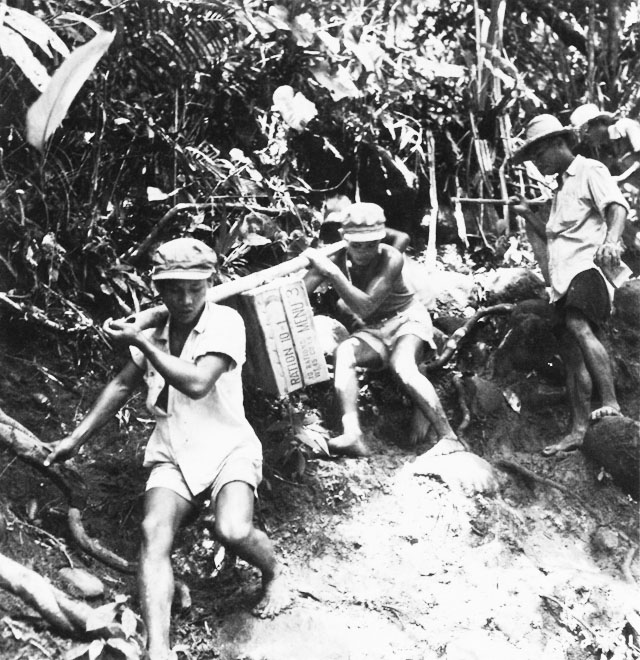
Filipino volunteers carry supplies to the 12th Cavalry Brigade

It took Clifford's men two weeks of struggle through mud and rain—often dangerously close to friendly mortar and artillery fire—to root the Japanese out of fighting positions on the way up Kilay Ridge. On 2 December Clifford's battalion finally cleared the heights overlooking the road, and 32nd Division units quickly took over. Clifford's outfit suffered 26 killed, 101 wounded and two missing, in contrast to 900 Japanese dead. For their arduous efforts against Kilay Ridge and adjacent areas, both flanking battalions received Presidential Unit Citations. Clifford and Spragins both received the Distinguished Service Cross for their actions. It was not until 14 December that the 32nd Division finally cleared the Breakneck–Kilay Ridge area, and linked up with the 1st Cavalry Division on 19 Dec, placing the most heavily defended portions of Highway 2 between Carigara Bay and the Ormoc Valley under X Corps control.

Throughout this phase, American efforts had become increasingly hampered by logistical problems. Mountainous terrain and impassable roads forced Sixth Army transportation units to improvise resupply trains of Navy landing craft, tracked landing vehicles, airdrops, artillery tractors, trucks, even carabaos and hundreds of barefoot Filipino bearers. The 727th Amphibian Tractor Battalion made daily, often multiple, trips with ammunition and rations between Capoocan and Calubian. From Calubian, the 727th tractors would navigate the Naga River to Consuegra and then traverse overland to Agahang. On their return trip, they would evacuate the casualties.

=== Battle of Shoestring Ridge ===
In mid-November XXIV Corps had the 32nd Infantry Regiment, under the command of Lt. Col. John M. Finn in western Leyte, and 7th Division remnants securing Burauen, but the arrival of the 11th Airborne Division on 22 November allowed Gen. Hodge to move the rest of the 7th Division to the west. On the night of 23 November the 32nd Infantry suddenly came under attack by the Japanese 26th Division along the Palanas River. The regiment's 2nd Battalion was pushed back off Hill 918 to a defensive position along the highway together with their artillery base, which consisted of Batteries A and B of the 49th Field Artillery Battalion and Battery B of the USMC 11th 155mm Gun Battalion. Gen. Arnold earlier had placed the 2nd Battalion, 184th Infantry, as a reserve for just such a counterattack. Also, a platoon of tanks from the 767th Tank Battalion was stationed at Damulaan. Battery C, 57th Field Artillery Battalion, arrived the next day. That night, the night of 24 November, Japanese attacks put four 105 mm (4.1 in) pieces of Battery B out of action. The 2nd Battalion, 184th Infantry was then released by Gen. Arnold to Col. Finn. The defensive battle for 'Shoestring Ridge', so named to reflect the supply situation, continued until 29 November, when US troops were able to take the offensive. During their failed attacks of the previous days, the Japanese under the command of Col. Saito had committed six infantry battalions.

=== Battle of the Ridges ===
Gen. Arnold finally began his advance toward Ormoc with a novel tactic. On the night of 4 December, vehicles of the 776th Amphibian Tank Battalion put to sea and leapfrogged south along the Leyte coast and positioned themselves west of Balogo. On 5 Dec, the tanks moved to within 200 yd (180 m) of the shore and fired into the hills in front of the advancing 17th and 184th Infantry. This tactic proved effective, greatly disorganizing the defenders, except where ground troops encountered enemy pockets on reverse slopes inland, shielded from the offshore tank fire. The 7th Division pushed north with two regiments which encountered heavy enemy fire coming from Hill 918, from which the entire coast to Ormoc City could be observed. By 8 Dec, the American forces had taken Hills 918, 380 and 606, plus the surrounding ridges. By 12 December, Gen. Arnold's lead battalion was less than 10 mi (16 km) south of Ormoc City.

=== Battle of the Airfields ===
While Gen. Arnold moved closer to Ormoc, on 6 December, the Japanese made a surprise attack on the Buri Airfield with the 16th, combined with 250 paratroopers of the 2nd Raiding Brigade, the Takachiho Paratroopers. At the time, the 11th Airborne Division, commanded by General Joseph May Swing defended the Burauen area. The Japanese aimed to recapture eastern Leyte airstrips and use them for their own planes. Descending Japanese paratroopers were "cut to shreds by the antiaircraft and field artillery units," according to one American artillery officer.

Although poorly coordinated—only one battalion of the Japanese 26th Infantry Division reached the battlefield—the enemy attack yielded the seizure of some abandoned weapons which they managed to use against the Americans over the next four days. The 11th Airborne Division, supported by the 149th Infantry, 38th Infantry Division, and the 382nd Infantry, 96th Infantry Division, plus hastily mustered groups of support and service troops, eventually contained the attack, and turned the tide by 9 Dec. With a few American supply dumps and aircraft on the ground destroyed and construction projects delayed, the enemy attacks on the airfields failed to have any effect on the overall Leyte Campaign. Gen. Suzuki ordered a retreat so he could deal with the American landing at Ormoc, but with only 200 men returning, the 16th Division ceased to exist.

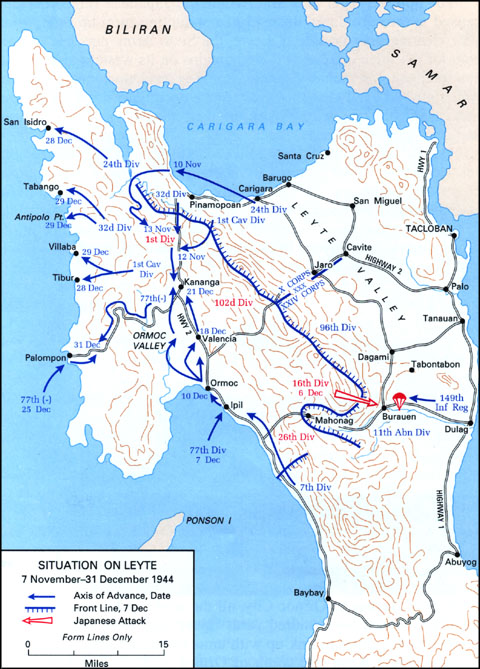
Situation at Leyte, 7 November–31 December 1944

=== Fall of Ormoc ===
Meanwhile, on the western side of Leyte, the US XXIV Corps received reinforcements on 7 December with the landing of the 77th Infantry Division under Maj. Gen. Andrew D. Bruce south of Ormoc City. The 77th Division's 305th and 307th Infantry Regiments came ashore at 0700 unopposed, supported by a company from the 776th Amphibian Tank Battalion. However, Admiral Arthur D. Storable's naval convoy was subjected to kamikaze air attacks, fifty-five aircraft making sixteen raids. Yet, the arrival of the 77th Division proved decisive. This enabled the 7th Division to resume its march north, and Japanese defenders were quickly squeezed between them.

Moving north, the 77th Division faced strong opposition at Camp Downes, a prewar Philippine constabulary post. Supported by the newly arrived 306th Infantry Regiment, plus the 902nd and 305th Field Artillery Battalions, Gen. Bruce's troops pushed through and beyond Camp Downes on 9 Dec, and entered Ormoc City on 10 December. The 7th and 77th Infantry Divisions linked up the next day.

In its final drive, US troops killed some 1,506 Japanese troops and took seven prisoners while sustaining 123 killed, 329 wounded and 13 missing. With Ormoc City captured, the XXIV Corps and X Corps were only 16 mi (26 km) apart. In between at Cogan, the last Japanese salient with its defenses anchored on a concrete blockhouse, north of Ormoc, and held by the 12th Independent Infantry Regiment, resisted the Americans for two days. On 14 December, the 305th Infantry closed on the stronghold, aided by heavy artillery barrages and employing flamethrowers and armored bulldozers. Hand-to-hand combat and the inspiring leadership of Medal of Honor awardee Captain Robert B. Nett cleared the Japanese from the blockhouse area, while the leading Company, E, of the 2nd Battalion, 305th Infantry moved forward through intense fire and killed several Japanese soldiers.

=== Westward march to the coast ===
After breaking out of Ormoc, the 77th Division took Valencia airfield, 7 mi (11 km) north, on 18 December, and continued north to establish contact with X Corps units. That same day, Gen. Sibert ordered the 1st Cavalry Division to complete the drive south. The 12th Cavalry Regiment pushed out of the mountains on a southwest track to Highway 2, then followed fire from the 271st Field Artillery Battalion to clear a 3 mi (4.8 km) stretch of the road. North of Ormoc Valley, the 32nd Division had met determined opposition from the defending Japanese 1st Division along Highway 2, after moving south past Kilay Ridge and entering a heavy rain forest, which limited visibility and concealed the enemy. Using flamethrowers, hand grenades, rifles, and bayonets, troops scratched out daily advances measured in yards, and in five days of hard fighting, the 126th and 127th Infantry Regiments advanced less than 1 mi (1.6 km). Contact between patrols of the 12th Cavalry and the 77th Division's 306th Infantry on 21 December marked the juncture of the US X and XXIV Corps and the closing of the Sixth Army's pincer maneuver against Ormoc Valley.

While the 77th and 32nd Divisions converged on the valley, Maj. Gen. Joseph M. Swing's 11th Airborne Division had moved into the central mountain passes from the east. With blocking positions established south of Leyte Valley on 22–24 November, the 511th Parachute Infantry Regiment pushed farther west into the mountains on the 25 November. After an arduous advance, the 511th reached Mahonag, 10 mi (16 km) west of Burauen, on 6 December, the same day Japanese paratroops landed at the Buri and San Pablo airfields. On 16 December, the 2nd Battalion, 32nd Infantry, made slow but steady progress into the mountains from the Ormoc Bay area to meet the airborne regiment and assist its passage westward. On 23 December, after battling scattered Japanese defenders on ridges and in caves, the 7th Division infantrymen met troops from the 2nd Battalion, 187th Glider Infantry Regiment, which had passed through the 511th, to complete the cross-island move, and basically destroying the Japanese 26th Infantry Division in the process.

Gen. Bruce opened the drive on Palompon by sending the 2nd and 3rd Battalions, 305th Infantry, with armor support, west along the road on the morning of 22 December. The 302nd Engineer Battalion followed, repairing and strengthening bridges for armor, artillery and supply vehicles. Assault units progressed rapidly through sporadic enemy fire until they hit strong positions about 8 mi (13 km) short of Palompon. To restore momentum, Gen. Bruce put the 1st Battalion, 305th Infantry, on Navy landing craft and dispatched it from the port of Ormoc to Palompon. Supported by fire from mortar boats of the 2nd Engineer Special Brigade and from the 155 mm (6.1 in) guns of the 531st Field Artillery Battalion, the infantrymen landed at 07:20 on 25 December and secured the small coastal town within four hours.

Learning of the seizure of the last port open to the Japanese, Gen. MacArthur announced the end of organized resistance on Leyte. As these sweeps continued, he transferred control of operations on Leyte and Samar to the Eighth Army on 26 December. Farther north, other US forces made faster progress against more disorganized and dispirited enemy troops. 1st Cavalry Division troops reached the coast on 28 December as 24th Division units cleared the last enemy positions from the northwest corner of Leyte on the same day and two days later met patrols of the 32nd Division.

== Aftermath ==
The campaign for Leyte was the first operation in the American reconquest of the Philippines, and proved the most decisive. Japanese losses in the campaign were heavy; the army lost four divisions and several combat units, while the navy lost 26 major warships, 46 large transports and hundreds of merchant ships. The campaign also reduced Japanese land-based air capability in the Philippines by more than 50%. Some 250,000 troops still remained on Luzon, but the air and naval support lost during the battle for Leyte narrowed Gen. Yamashita's options that he now had to fight a passive defense of Luzon, the largest and most important island in the Philippines. In effect, once the battle of Leyte was lost, the Japanese gave up on retaining the Philippines for much longer, conceding to the Allies a strategic region from which Japan could be easily cut off from outside resources, and from which assaults on the Japanese home islands could be launched.

== 1998 claims of Japanese intelligence ==
In 1998 it was claimed in Australia (see Royal Commission on Espionage) that Allied estimates of Japanese troop strengths including those on Leyte were given to Tokyo via the Soviet consulate in Harbin, Manchuria as Stalin wanted to delay an American victory over Japan until the Soviet Union could participate. MacArthur's G-2 Willoughby had underestimated the numbers, and the troops were reinforced. The secret "Ultra" estimates were not available to the Soviets, but were given to them by members of Australian Foreign Minister Evatt's staff.

== See also ==
- Bataan death march
- George Benjamin, Jr.
- Richard Ira Bong
- Leonard C. Brostrom
- Elmer E. Fryar
- Leroy Johnson (Medal of Honor)
- Ova A. Kelley
- Thomas McGuire
- William A. McWhorter
- Military history of the Philippines during World War II
- Military history of the United States during World War II
- Harold H. Moon, Jr.
- Charles E. Mower
- Iliff David Richardson
- John F. Thorson
- Dirk J. Vlug
- Francis B. Wai
