= Stuart McWhorter =

Deputy Governor of Tennessee
- Incumbent
- Assumed office October 15, 2025
- Governor: Bill Lee
- Preceded by: Butch Eley

Personal details
- Born: 1967 or 1968 (age 58–59)
- Party: Republican
- Relatives: R. Clayton McWhorter (father)
- Education: Clemson University (BS); University of Alabama, Birmingham (MHA)

Stuart C. McWhorter (born 1967/1968) is an American government official and businessman currently serving as the deputy governor of Tennessee and commissioner of the Tennessee Department of Economic and Community Development (TNECD). He has served as deputy governor since October 2025 and commissioner of the TNECD since July 2022. McWhorter was also commissioner of the Tennessee Department of Finance and Administration (TDFA) from 2019 to 2020.

== Early life and business career ==
McWhorter is the son of businessman R. Clayton McWhorter. He grew up in Atlanta, with his mother. After high school, McWhorter attended Clemson University in South Carolina, where he graduated in 1991 with a Bachelor of Science degree in management. During his time at Clemson, he served as the team's Tiger mascot from 1987 to 1990. After he graduated from Clemson, McWhorter continued his education at the University of Alabama at Birmingham (UAB), where he earned a master's degree in health administration in 1993. He began working as an administrator as a Birmingham hospital after his graduation from UAB.

In 1995, McWhorter began working at OrthoLink Physicians Corp., a physician practice management services company, where he served as vice president of managed care for three years before joining Clayton Associates, a venture capital firm established by his father. He eventually took over running his father's firm. McWhorter later became chief executive officer (CEO) of the Nashville Entrepreneur Center in 2015. He also founded venture firm FCA Venture Partners and chaired the FirstBank Financial Corporation in Nashville.

McWhorter was an original investor in the website 247Sports and acquired The Clemson Insider website in 2021.

== Political career ==
McWhorter served as finance chair for Bill Lee's successful 2018 campaign for Governor of Tennessee. In 2019, he left his role at Clayton Associates to become the commissioner of the Tennessee Department of Finance and Administration (TDFA) under Governor Lee. During his time as TDFA commissioner, McWhorter "led the drafting of two fiscal state budgets" and "co-chaired the Governor's Healthcare Modernization Task Force". He also served as director of the COVID-19 Unified Command, a task force established by Lee that oversaw Tennessee's response to the pandemic. At the end of May 2020, he departed Lee's administration in order to return to the private sector. Two years later, in July 2022, he came back to Lee's administration and was named commissioner of the Tennessee Department of Economic and Community Development (TNECD). In October 2025, McWhorter also added the duty of deputy governor of Tennessee, succeeding Butch Eley in that role.

In November 2026, after Marsha Blackburn won the 2026 gubernatorial election, she named McWhorter as head of her transition team. He was also reported to be on a shortlist of candidates being considered for appointment to the United States Senate to succeed Blackburn.

== Personal life ==
McWhorter is married and has five children with his wife, Leigh Anne. He and his family made a $2.5 million donation to Clemson's softball program in 2021, leading to the team's McWhorter Stadium being named in their honor. He lives in Nashville.
