= Vlug =

Vlug is a surname. Notable people with the surname include:

- Dirk J. Vlug (1916–1996), American Medal of Honor recipient
- Jeffrey Vlug (born 1986), Dutch footballer
