= 126th Infantry Regiment (United States) =

- 126th Infantry Regiment coat of arms
- Active: 1855–present
- Country: USA
- Allegiance: Michigan
- Branch: United States Army
- Role: Light Infantry
- Size: Battalion
- Nickname: Second Michigan (special designation)
- Motto: "Courage Sans Peur" (Courage Without Fear)
- Colors: Blue and Silver
- Engagements: Civil War; Spanish–American War; Pancho Villa Expedition; World War I World War II; Iraq War; War in Afghanistan
- Decorations: Presidential Unit Citation, Valorous Unit Award, Meritorious Unit Commendation

Commanders
- Current commander: LTC Mitch Graham
- Notable commanders: Joseph S. Bradley

Insignia
- Distinctive unit insignia

The 126th Infantry Regiment ("Second Michigan") is a United States military unit of the Michigan Army National Guard. The 126th was originally an infantry regiment, then was converted into an armoured role, and then was converted to a light cavalry reconnaissance unit, with subordinate units stationed in Cadillac, Wyoming, Dowagiac, and Detroit. It was converted back to an infantry unit in 2016.

== Early history ==
The 126th Infantry existed for its first 144 years as an infantry unit. The 126th Infantry dates back as early as 12 July 1855 when the Grand Rapids Light Guard and Grand Rapids Artillery companies were organized. The first officers of the Grand Rapids Light Guard included Wright L. Coffinberry as captain; Frederick W. Worden, E.T. Nelson, and A.L. Gage as lieutenants; Milton S. Littlefield, Benjamin B. Church, S.S. Porter, and G.M. McCray as sergeants. Other charter members of the Light Guard included Edward A. Earle, Joseph C. Herkner, Benjamin Luce, Henry Spring, Miles Adams, E. H. Hunt, Dr. Willard Bliss, Frank Earle, Warren P. Mills, James Sargeant, J.E. Earle, John Grady, C.B. Hinsdill, Charles D. Lyon, George E. Judd, Henry Whipple, Robert M. Collins, F. Shriver, Byron R. Pierce, B. D. Ball, Edwin S. Pierce, John Seymour, Samuel Judd, Thomas Sargeant, G. W. Remington, William Livingston, Henry Ely, and Joseph Houseman. Later that year Ringgold’s Light Artillery was organized, and four years later in 1859, the Grand Rapids Rifles came into existence. These companies along with several others from Ionia formed the 51st Volunteer Uniformed Michigan Militia Regiment prior to the American Civil War.

== American Civil War ==
The four companies formed the core of the 3rd Michigan Volunteer Infantry Regiment that joined the Civil War on 13 June 1861. The regimental commander at the time was Colonel Daniel McConnell. The Third Michigan fought in twelve campaigns before it was mustered out in June 1864. Besides five Grand Rapids companies, the Third included companies from Boston and Lyons in Ionia County, Lansing, Muskegon, and Georgetown.

On 13 June 1861 the Third Regiment marched out of Cantonment Anderson in Grand Rapids, Michigan towards the recently constructed railroad depot near Leonard and Plainfield streets, where it boarded and departed the area for the war. While attached to Richardson’s brigade of Colonel Miles’s Division, the Third participated in its first engagement against Confederate forces just thirty-eight days after being federalized. It began as a part of a reconnaissance in force towards Blackburn’s Ford along Bull Run (the term "run" is southern for creek or small river). On 21 July, the Third marched with Richardson’s brigade back to Blackburn’s ford to keep the rebels occupied while the rest of McDowell’s army hit the Confederate’s left flank. After desultory firing at the ford, Richardson learned of the Federal rout on the right and was recalled to Centreville. What they saw was utter chaos and confusion as the Confederate forces, now reinforced, literally cut through the advancing and then retreating Union forces.

Morale by the close of that first summer was presumably low in the Third Michigan. During the next few months a number of officers including Colonel McConnell resigned and returned home to Grand Rapids. Major Champlin, who had originally organized Ringgold's Light Artillery back in 1855, assumed command of the regiment on 28 October 1861, and under him, the Third went into winter quarters at Alexandria, Virginia. That next March, the Third Michigan was assigned to General Berry’s Brigade of the Third Red Diamond Division and entered the Peninsula campaign. A few months later at Fair Oaks, the regiment’s losses were severe—thirty killed, one hundred and twenty-four wounded, and fifteen missing. Included among the dead was Captain Samuel Judd, and Colonel Champlin had been severely wounded. Several months following Lee's surrender in April 1865, a great homecoming by the citizens of Grand Rapids was held for the returning heroes. On 4 July 1865, tables were set the entire length of the Pearl Street Bridge for a welcome-home celebration.

=== Medal of Honor recipients ===
Two soldiers in the Third earned the Medal of Honor.

- Private Benjamin Morse, Company C, Third Michigan Infantry
- Corporal Walter Mundell, Company E, Fifth Michigan Infantry (This was an old Third Michigan company that transferred in its entirety to the Fifth at the end of the Third’s three-year enlistment period.)

=== After the Civil War ===
In the months and years that followed, veterans' groups were formed under the banner of the Grand Army of the Republic; however, the Old Third Michigan didn't organize an association until 23 February 1871. When they did, they elected Colonel Edwin S. Pierce, president; John H. Sumner, secretary; and Colonel George E. Judd, treasurer.

In Grand Rapids, the earliest of the new, independent companies was the Valley City Zouaves, organized first in 1866 and reorganized on 14 March 1873. However, this company did not remain in existence for long and was never actually mustered into state service.

Several years after the end of the Civil War, the Grand Rapids Guard company was organized by veterans of the Third and other regiments. The company was mustered into state service in 1872 as part of the Michigan State Troops. It was called out to aid authorities during a riot at the Muskegon County jail in 1873 and to quell a disturbance at Greenville during the Flat River labor dispute in 1874. That year the Grand Rapids Guard became Company B 2nd Infantry Regiment when the regiment was organized at Grand Rapids. Over the course of the next 24 years through various reorganizations the 2nd Infantry included companies from Coldwater, Kalamazoo, Flint, Bay City, East Saginaw, Port Huron, Marquette, Niles, Ionia, Manistee, Big Rapids, Three Rivers, and Grand Haven.

The Michigan State Troops were redesignated as the Michigan National Guard on 31 December 1894, in response to a growing use of that designation across the country. It was first applied to the New York state militia in 1824 as a compliment to General Lafayette, who had been visiting the United States at that time. Lafayette had commanded the Garde Nationale in Paris around 1789.

== War with Spain ==
In 1898, the 2nd Infantry was mobilized for the war with Spain as one of five Michigan regiments. It was redesignated the 32nd Volunteer Infantry Regiment and included twelve battalions: four from Grand Rapids, four from Detroit, and one each from Coldwater, Grand Haven, Kalamazoo and Battle Creek. The 32nd rendezvoused at Island Lake and was sent to Tampa, Florida with Colonel William T. McGurrin in command. It was just about to embark for Cuba when hostilities ceased and the 32nd returned home.

Back at home, the regiment resumed its 2nd Infantry designation and moved into a new armory. This was the first time since 1855 that all four Grand Rapids companies were located in one armory. The remaining companies were located at Coldwater, Kalamazoo, Big Rapids, Lansing, Manistee, Muskegon and Battle Creek. Owing to poor showings in annual inspections, the Manistee company was dropped for Grand Haven and a new company was organized at Manistee. The Battle Creek company also was disbanded and Adrian joined the regiment. The Lansing company was eventually redesignated as artillery, and an Ionia company joined the 2nd.

The Clark Building armory in Grand Rapids was thought in its day to be one of the finest armories in the state. Its furnishings and equipment had a value estimated at $11,000. The drill hall was rather large, and the armory included ample equipment rooms, assembly rooms, billiard rooms, reading rooms, officers' rooms, an indoor target range eighty feet in length, a cafe, club rooms, elegantly furnished parlors, and a library.

In 1903, Congress passed the Militia Act of 1903, which had a huge impact on the Second Michigan and all other militia units in the United States. The bill and its amendments in effect served to nationalize the militia and reduce its status as a state volunteer force. Under terms of the act, the organized militia was uniformly redesignated as the National Guard and organized along army lines, with provisions for federal weapons and equipment. Twenty-four training sessions per year plus a summer encampment were now required for all units. Federal instruction and inspection were authorized and provisions made which elevated the status of Guard officers to equality with their federal counterparts.

On 3 September 1912, in response to a request from officials at the state prison in Jackson, the governor directed that Companies C and M, Second Infantry from Kalamazoo, join companies of the First Infantry in aiding civil authorities in quelling the riot and protecting the institution from outside attack or interference with the discipline of the convicts. Within two hours of receiving the order, both companies were ready to leave the armory. The entire regiment saw service in the 1913 copper strike in the Upper Peninsula, serving in copper country from 24 July to the first of November. During the regiment’s stay, there was no loss of life and negligible property damage for any of citizen.

== Mexican Border War ==
On 19 June 1916, the entire Michigan National Guard was called out for service on the Mexican border instigated by raids on American border towns by the Mexican Pancho Villa. The Thirty-second was mustered into federal service on the first of July. The organization of the 2nd included four companies from Grand Rapids, two from Kalamazoo, and one each from Coldwater, Adrian, Ionia, Grand Haven, Muskegon and Big Rapids. This war also became known as the Pancho Villa Expedition.

Shortly thereafter, the regiment departed for El Paso, Texas, arriving at Camp Cotton on 12 July, located a mere three hundred yards from the Mexican border. Upon its arrival, regular army inspectors took note of the excellent condition of the regiment and the short amount of time it took to get settled into camp. The next four weeks were spent in intensive training. During this time, details were organized to guard important points in the vicinity of El Paso. On 15 August, the regiment took over the entire outpost along the Rio Grande and the boundary line in New Mexico. This consisted of a line stretching from Fort Hancock, 50 miles (80 km) southeast of El Paso, to Las Cruces, New Mexico, for a total of 47 miles (76 km) in length. While the Grand Rapids battalion was on the border, construction work on the new Michigan Street armory was completed.

On Saturday, 13 January 1917, the final inspection of the regiment had been conducted. The regiment struck camp on Thursday and returned to Fort Wayne, where it was mustered out of service on 15 February. Under federal laws Congress adopted in June 1916 the regiment reverted to its National Guard status.

== World War I ==
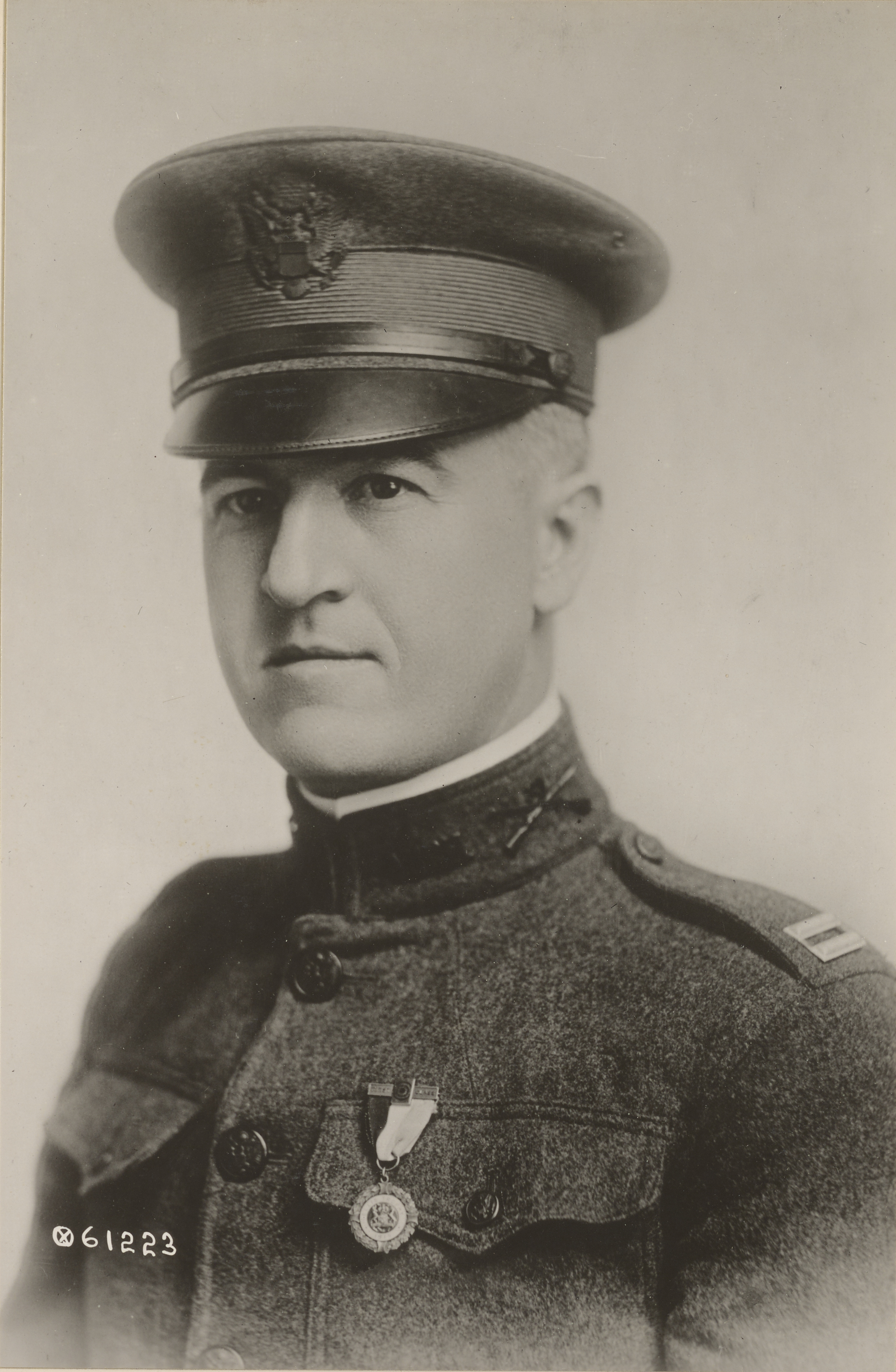
Capt. Frederick W. Beaudry, Co. H, 126th Infantry, killed in action August 1, 1918, during the Aisne-Marne Offensive

The 32nd returned home that spring only to find itself being activated for the World War. In September, it was ordered to Camp MacArthur, Texas, where it underwent another major reorganization to become part of the 32nd Division, which included Michigan and Wisconsin troops.

Under the command of Colonel Joseph Westnedge, the 32nd became the 126th Infantry Regiment. The new regiment included the following companies: A-Coldwater, B-Adrian, C-Kalamazoo, D-Ionia, E-Ann Arbor, F-Jackson, G-Detroit, H-Detroit, I-Big Rapids/Muskegon, K-Grand Rapids, L-Grand Haven/Muskegon, and M-Grand Rapids. In addition, the regimental headquarters, machine gun company, supply company, sanitary detachment and band were all from Grand Rapids.

The regiment left the United States on 19 February 1918 bound for France. When it first arrived it was used for replacements and supply duty. Soon, the regiment, along with the 32nd Division, was sent into battle. When the war was over on 11 November, the 126th had seen service in four major campaigns and earned the French Croix de Guerre. The 126th returned in May 1919 but without its dearly beloved Colonel Westnedge who had died that previous fall from the effects of mustard gas. PFC Joseph William Guyton, the first American killed on German-held territory in WWI, was posthumously awarded the French Croix de guerre.

== Interwar period ==
The 126th Infantry arrived at the port of Boston, Massachusetts, on 14 May 1919 on the troopship USS F. J. Luckenbach and was demobilized 24 May–2 June 1919 at Camp Custer, Michigan. Per the National Defense Act of 1920, the regiment was reconstituted in the National Guard in 1921, assigned to the 32nd Division, and allotted to the state of Michigan. It was reorganized in 1920–21 under the leadership of Colonel Earl R. Stewart and federally recognized on 10 June 1921 with headquarters at Grand Rapids. The regiment was called up to perform riot control during an automobile worker’s strike in Flint, Michigan, 13 January–16 February 1937. It conducted annual summer training most years at Camp Grayling, Michigan, from 1921 to 1939, including joint summer training with the Organized Reserve 337th Infantry, 85th Division, in 1928 and with the 340th Infantry, 86th Division, in 1929. The regiment participated in the 1936 Second Army maneuvers with the 32nd Division in Allegan County, Michigan.

== World War II ==
On 15 October 1940, before the United States involvement in the Second World War, the 126th Infantry was inducted into active federal service and moved to Camp Beauregard, Louisiana, where it arrived 27 October 1940. It was later transferred on 19 February 1941 to Camp Livingston, Louisiana. The makeup of the 126th included the following units:

- Headquarters: Grand Rapids
- Headquarters Company: Grand Rapids
- Anti-Tank Platoon: Grand Rapids
- Service Company, Band: Grand Rapids
- Medical Detachment: Grand Rapids
- 1st Battalion Headquarters and Headquarters Detachment: Adrian
  - Company A: Coldwater
  - Company B: Holland
  - Company C: Kalamazoo
  - Company D: Holland
- 2nd Battalion Headquarters and Headquarters Detachment: Muskegon
  - Company E: Big Rapids
  - Company F: Grand Haven
  - Company G: Muskegon
  - Company H: Ionia
- 3rd Battalion Headquarters and Headquarters Detachment: Grand Rapids
  - Companies I, K, L, M: Grand Rapids

During the summer of 1941, the regiment participated in the Third and Fourth Army maneuvers—nicknamed the Louisiana Maneuvers—which provided the army high command a good look at the preparedness of the regiment. The first test, which was held in the vicinity of Camp Beauregard, was conducted from 16 June through the 27 and included the Thirty-second Division as well as the Thirty-seventh from Ohio. From 16 to 30 August, the maneuvers expanded to include the Thirty-fourth and Thirty-eighth divisions. During September, the largest maneuvers were held with the Seventh Corps of the Second Army, opposing the Fourth, Fifth, and Eighth corps of the Third Army. The Grand Rapids Guard was part of the Fifth Corps. It was the largest maneuver of its kind in the history of the army and included some one hundred thousand men.

=== Redirected to Pacific ===
Initially trained for the war in Europe, they were turned around in late March and told to be in San Francisco in three weeks. On 18 April 1942, the 32nd Division boarded a convoy of seven Matson Line ships, and the 126th boarded the S.S. Lurline, a luxury liner converted to transport duty, and four days later sailed for the South Pacific. The regiment crossed the equator on 30 April, and the International Date Line on 7 May, reaching Adelaide, Australia, seven days later. There, the 126th unloaded and moved to Camp Sandy Creek some 18 miles (29 km) outside the city.

In August 1942, the 126th moved 900 miles (1,400 km) to Brisbane and was billeted at Camp Cable. The camp was named in honor of Corporal Gerald Cable, the first member of the 32nd Division killed by the Japanese during World War II. Cable, a member of Service Company, 126th Infantry, along with approximately twenty other men, were on board a ship transporting trucks and other equipment from Brisbane to Adelaide when a torpedo hit the ship in the stern.

=== Move to New Guinea ===
The 126th was organized into a regimental combat team composed of the entire 126th Infantry Regiment; Company A, 107th Medical Battalion; Company A, 114th Engineer Battalion; 1st Platoon, Company D, 107th Medical Detachment; Section C, 10th Evacuation Hospital; 107th Quartermaster Company; and a number of other support forces. Colonel Lawrence A. Quinn was in command of the combat team. First, Second, and Third battalions were under the command of Lt. Col. Edmund Carrier, Lt. Col. Henry Geerds, and Lt. Col. Clarence Tomlinson, respectively. The regiment was the first U.S. force to be dispatched to Port Moresby in New Guinea in September 1942. Once in Port Moresby the regiment was put to work constructing the American base camp, once again missing out on valuable training.

=== Trek across Owen Stanley Range ===
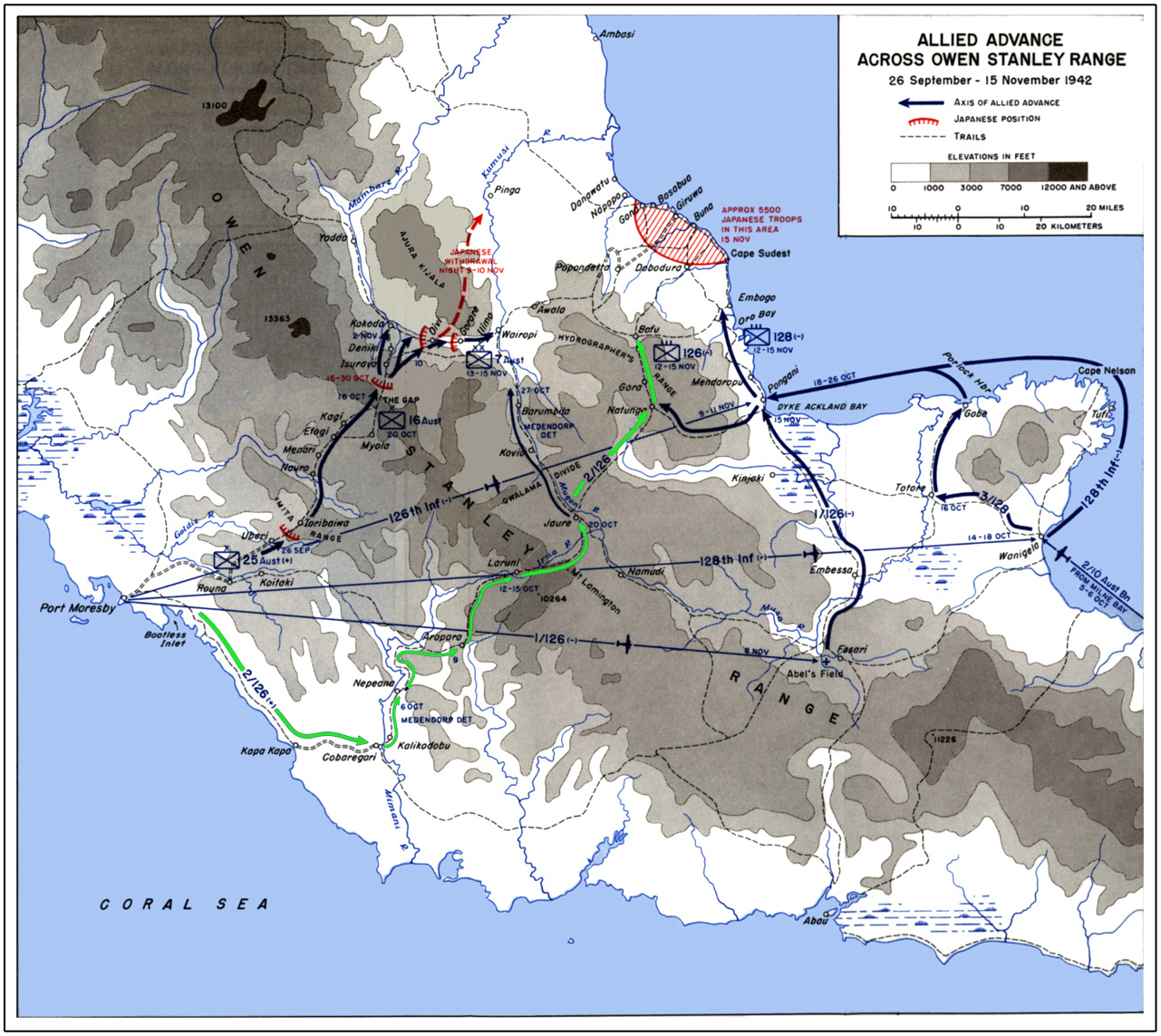
Allied advance over the Owen Stanley Range via the Kapa Kapa Trail 26 September - 15 November 1942

In October 1942 the 2nd Battalion, assisted by several hundred natives carriers, was sent across the Owen Stanley Ranges via the Kapa Kapa Trail toward Jaure, where they were to flank the Japanese retreating towards the coast on the Kokoda Trail. The total distance over the mountains to the Japanese positions was over 130 miles (210 km), and most of the trail had been rarely used.

They were completely unprepared; the battalion suffered greatly from exposure to the elements in the mountains. The troops also suffered from malaria, dengue fever, bush typhus, trenchfoot, and tropical dysentery. The men carried only six days rations, expecting to be resupplied en route.

Some of their rations included including hardtack, rice, and Australian bully beef which had become rancid. Many men got food poisoning. They had leather toilet seats but no machetes, insect repellent, waterproof containers for medicine or personal effects, and it rained heavily every day. It was "one of the most harrowing marches in American military history."

The battalion took 42 days to cross the mountains and reach the coast. They never saw a Japanese soldier during their trek, and the battalion reached the north coast after the Australians who had fought the Japanese down the Kokoda Trail. During their march, the remainder of the regiment was flown across the Owen Stanley Range, arriving before the 2/126th. The battalion earned the nickname "The Ghost Battalion" during the march, referring not only to the ghost-like conditions encountered when they passed 3,080 metres (10,100 ft)-high Mount Obree, which they nicknamed Ghost Mountain, but to their condition upon arrival.

=== Battle of Buna-Gona ===
Lt. Gen. Robert Eichelberger found that when the soldiers of 2/126th arrived at the front they were not ready for combat. Nonetheless, after a week's rest, the men were ordered to the front where they were key players in the extremely difficult Battle of Buna-Gona. The unit was decimated by the battle. The 126th Infantry was the hardest-hit of the three regiments of the 32nd Infantry Division . It had 131 officers and 3,040 enlisted men when it entered combat against the Japanese in mid-November. At the conclusion of the battle on 22 January, the unit had been decimated by disease as well as battle. Only 32 officers and 579 enlisted men were left, less than a full battalion.

=== Refit and retrained in Australia ===
After the 32nd Division wrapped up operations at Buna, beginning on 1 March 1943, the 126/32 was transferred to Brisbane, Australia. The complete move took several weeks; the last units arrived in April. The division then returned to Camp Cable where it had been stationed before it left for New Guinea.

Major General William H. Gill at Camp Carson, Colorado was ordered to Australia to assume command of the division. After a period of rest, the division began training to induct the many replacements into its ranks and help them incorporate the lessons of jungle warfare the division had gained in battle. The troops also received six weeks' amphibious training.

=== Landing at Saidor ===
The 126th RCT/32nd Infantry Division was selected to lead Operation Michaelmas to capture Saidor, bypassing the Japanese garrison at Sio to the east. Transferred from Goodenough Island, troops from the U.S. 6th Army, 126th/32 ID, plus the 120th Field Artillery, arrived on January 2, 1944, aboard LSTs and landing craft. The forces were commanded by General Clarence A. Martin. The landing bypassed the Japanese garrison at Sio to the east. They met little opposition.

By the end of 2 January, over 8,000 U.S. troops were ashore. On the next day the Americans established a defensive perimeter and began to send out patrols.

At Saidor, the U.S. Army used carrier pigeons for the last time in their history to deliver messages from offshore boats to troops ashore, delivering messages before radios were set up. Approximately 200 Japanese defended the Saidor area, but most fled inland and withdrew over inland trails towards Madang.

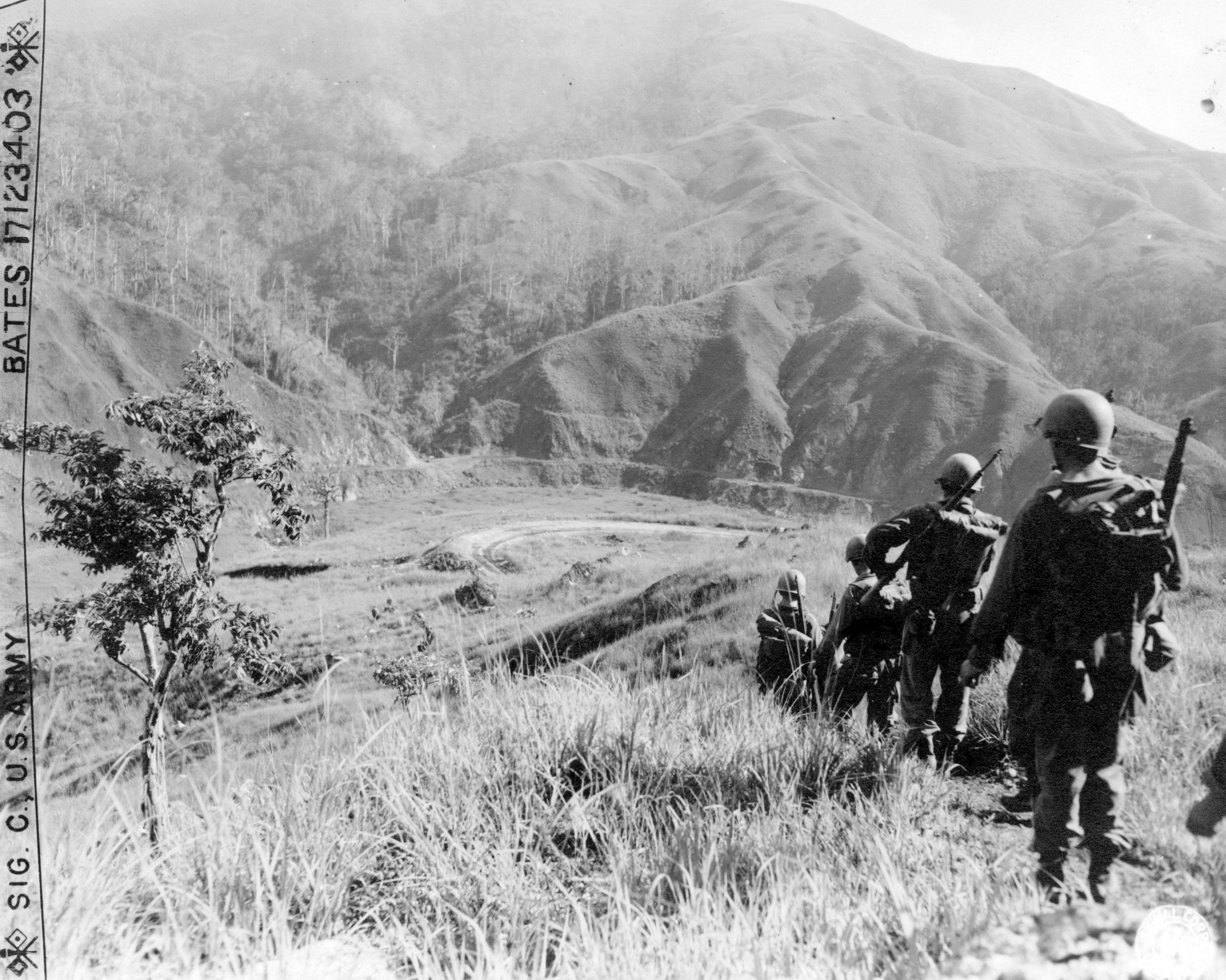
Men of the 126th Infantry going down a hill into Santa Fe, Luzon

=== Other campaigns ===
After taking part in the Western New Guinea campaign, the unit later fought in Leyte and Luzon. The 32nd Division logged a total of 654 days of combat during World War II, more than any other United States Army division. The unit was inactivated in 1946 after occupation duty in Japan.

=== Recognition ===
Three soldiers in the 126th earned the Medal of Honor:

- PFC William A. McWhorter.
- SGT Leroy Johnson.
- PFC Dirk J. Vlug.

== Cold War ==
Following the War, the 126th returned to its home stations, but over the course of the next 45 years it underwent many transformations and reorganizations. It lost its attachment to towns such as Adrian, Coldwater, Muskegon, Ionia, and Kalamazoo. For a time, Greenville, Alma and South Haven were elements of the 126th.

In March 1953, Wisconsin Highway 32, as well as a portion of former U.S. Route 12 in Michigan, was named in honor of the 32nd Infantry Division, and all Highway 32 shields carry the Red Arrow insignia. A memorial plaque describing the division is located at southern end of WI-32 on Sheridan Road in Kenosha County, Wisconsin. Ceremonies were held along the route and included veterans of the Grand Rapids Guard, which had been part of the Thirty-second Division during both world wars. Although US-12 was later moved when Interstate 94 was built, portions of the Red Arrow Highway still exist between Kalamazoo and New Buffalo

A devastating tornado struck the Hudsonville, Standale, Comstock Park, and northern Grand Rapids areas on 3 April 1956. More than eight hundred members of the regiment were called to state duty to protect lives and property.

On 15 March 1959, the regiment reorganized into two Battle Groups, the First and Second Battle Groups 126th Infantry, with both organizations' headquarters located at Grand Rapids. This dramatic reorganization in the U.S. Army was in effect the termination of the regimental system, an old tradition in military forces worldwide. This new "pentomic" system created five such battle groups in the Forty-sixth Division. The 126th Infantry, heroic in two world wars, ceased to exist less than forty-two years after its organization.

Recognizing the problems of the "pentomic" divisional alignment in a nuclear era, the U.S. Army reorganized under the new ROAD (Reorganization Objectives Army Division) concept on 15 March 1963. Both First and Second Battle Groups were carved up to reform First, Second, and Third battalions 126th Infantry along with the new Headquarters and Headquarters Company, Second Brigade, Forty-sixth Infantry Division headquartered in Grand Rapids.

On Palm Sunday, 11 April 1965, a series of tornadoes struck the southern part of the Lower Peninsula. The deadly twisters first struck north of Grand Rapids in the Alpine township area. Companies A and C, Third Battalion, 126th Infantry were called into action almost immediately and joined the Kent County Civil Defense Force, as well as other state, county, and city law enforcement agencies. The two companies managed to secure the affected area, prevent looting, and assisted with other disaster response duties.

The new Grand Valley Armory in Wyoming, Michigan was dedicated on 31 May 1965, providing a permanent home to the Second Brigade Headquarters, along with First and Third battalions 126th Infantry, and the Forty-sixth Infantry Division Band.

On 15 November 1965, the most radical reorganization in the history of the National Guard took place on orders of Secretary of Defense Robert McNamara creating a Selected Reserve Force (SRF or "super-ready force"). The Second Brigade, Forty-sixth Infantry Division, under command of Colonel Robert T. Williams, was designated the headquarters for SRF units in Michigan, with the Third Battalion 126th Infantry designated as West Michigan’s SRF battalion. All Michigan elements of the SRF were additionally assigned to the Thirty-eighth Infantry Division of Indiana, an SRF division in the event of mobilization.

== Maintaining civil order and reorganization ==
The Third Battalion 126th Infantry was ordered to state active duty on 31 August 1966, following four nights of racial violence at Benton Harbor, Michigan. A total force of four hundred officers and men were assembled. The force was reduced the next day to a total of 175, and training was undertaken to prepare for any deployment into the problem area. On Labor Day, the fifth of September, the battalion was stood down as the situation came under control without the use of troops. On 23 July 1967, the Grand Rapids Guard was called to active state duty once again, this time in response to rioting in the city of Detroit where arsonists and sniper fire had caused extensive damage from fires, resulting in deaths to both rioters and civilian authorities.

With the loss of the 46th Infantry Division in 1968, the 126th was scaled down to a single Infantry battalion, and the 1st and 2nd battalions' colors were retired. The reorganization redesignated the Second Brigade as the Forty-sixth Brigade assigned to the Thirty-eighth Infantry "Cyclone" Division, headquartered in Indianapolis. Some elements of the First and Third battalions were reorganized as divisional support elements such as Co. D 113th Engineer Battalion, Co. D (FS) 738th Maintenance Battalion, Second Platoon Thirty-eighth MP Company, Second Truck Platoon Co. B Thirty-eighth Supply and Transportation Battalion, and Brigade Admin Section Thirty-eighth Admin Co.

On 4 April 1968, Martin Luther King Jr., a leader of the Civil Rights Movement, was assassinated. The Michigan National Guard was ordered to state active duty the next day, to prevent possible outbreaks of violence similar to the previous summer (such as those in Detroit, Newark, Tampa, Buffalo, Plainfield). Headquarters Forty-sixth Brigade and Third Battalion, 126th Infantry proceeded to Detroit and established round-the-clock patrols to prevent any incidents. The brigade’s separate units remained at the Grand Valley Armory and were reinforced by units from Muskegon and Greenville in the event of outbreaks in other western state cities. These units were released two days later. The Forty-sixth Brigade and Third Battalion moved to Belle Isle for two days before being released from state duty on the tenth of April and returning to their home stations.

On 13 October 1990, fifty years after being mobilized for World War II, the 126th Infantry Regiment, including veterans of many of the "old 126th" and "Red Arrow" units, paraded through the city of Grand Rapids and were honored by many state and local dignitaries. The occasion marked the anniversary of the mobilization of National Guard troops prior to World War II, and the grand old 126th Infantry’s 135th birthday. On 3 June 1991, the city of Wyoming, under Mayor Harold Voorhees, passed a resolution designating Forty-fourth Street as 126th Infantry Memorial Boulevard. Street signs that included the regimental crest were placed along the Wyoming portion of the street. On 20 August 1992, the Michigan Historical Commission placed the 126th Infantry on the State Register of Historic Sites. A marker was commissioned and dedicated in front of the Grand Valley Armory on 11 November 1992, prior to the start of the traditional Grand Rapids Veterans Day parade. The Grand Rapids Guard, Incorporated, underwrote the $2,200 expense.

During the summer of 1996, The 126th Infantry was mobilized to provide security for the 1996 Summer Olympics in Atlanta, Georgia.

In the spring of 1991, the 126th Infantry learned it might be inactivated along with the rest of the Forty-sixth Infantry Brigade as part of a post–Cold War reorganization plan by the Pentagon. A minor reorganization followed and resulted in bringing Alma back into the battalion as Company A Third Battalion 126th Infantry. Units at Grand Haven and Holland consolidated and were redesignated as Det. 1 Co. B and Company B (-). In the late 1990s, the units at Grand Haven and Holland were disbanded. In 1999, the 3rd Battalion 126th Infantry ended 144 years of Infantry tradition when it was reorganized and redesignated as the 1st Battalion, 126th Armor.

== War on terror ==
Following the attack on the United States on 11 September 2001, elements of the 126th Armor were mobilized stateside under Operation Noble Eagle for Airbase Security Enforcement at both TACOM and Selfridge Air National Guard Base. Later, other members were deployed to Texas and California with the mission of loading and unloading ships in support of the war on terror. In 2004, a small contingent was sent to Afghanistan in support of Operation Enduring Freedom with the task of training Afghan soldiers. On 4 January 2005, a company-sized element of the battalion was mobilized at Fort Dix, New Jersey for (Security Forces) training, and then later deployed to Iraq in support of Operation Iraqi Freedom. This particular unit was stationed in the Green Zone in central Baghdad with the primary mission of providing security for Iraq's top-tier one government personnel, while also having a minor role in conducting route security missions in Western Baghdad. The company returned home to Grand Rapids, Michigan on 26 February 2006.

On 12 August 2005, a permanent memorial to the 126th was dedicated at Camp Grayling, Michigan. In October 2006 the 1–126 Armor transitioned to the 1–126 Cavalry, consisting of scout, infantry, and headquarters troops. In April 2007 the unit was alerted for service in support of Operation Iraqi Freedom. The unit was mobilized to Fort Hood, Texas in January 2008 and deployed to Kuwait and Iraq in April 2008. During their deployment they have served as a Security Force (SECFOR) unit, providing convoy security to distribution operations in Kuwait and Iraq. They returned to Michigan on 12 December 2008.

In early January 2012 they deployed to Afghanistan in support of Operation Enduring Freedom and returned home in late 2012. On 20 May 2012, two vehicles from C-Troop 1–126 hit Improvised Explosive Devices (IED's) while conducting combat and security patrols in the Shah Wali Kot district of Afghanistan. 10 members of the unit received Purple Hearts for their injuries. The unit received the Valorous Unit Award as an attached unit to the 2nd Battalion, 17th Field Artillery Regiment via permanent order 274–04 on 2 October 2013.

In March 2016, the unit began transitioning back to infantry. In January 2017, it joined the 32nd Infantry Brigade Combat Team, as the Army added a third maneuver battalion to its brigade combat teams.
