= Justice McWhorter =

Justice McWhorter may refer to:

- George G. McWhorter (1833–1891), associate justice of the Florida Supreme Court
- Henry C. McWhorter (1836–1913), associate justice of the Supreme Court of Appeals of West Virginia
