= Jim Bryson (politician) =

American politician (born 1961)

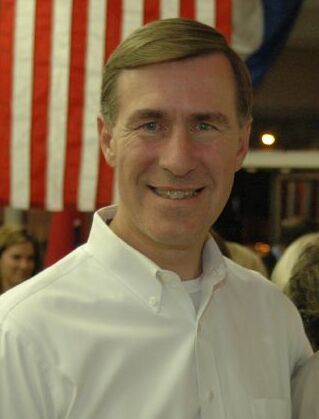
- Bryson in 2006

Commissioner of the Tennessee Department of Finance and Administration
- Incumbent
- Assumed office June 15, 2022
- Governor: Bill Lee
- Succeeded by: Stuart McWhorter

Member of the Tennessee Senate from the 23rd district
- In office January 14, 2003 – January 9, 2007
- Preceded by: Marsha Blackburn
- Succeeded by: Jack Johnson

Personal details
- Born: July 14, 1961 (age 65) Fayetteville, Arkansas, U.S.
- Party: Republican
- Education: Baylor University (BA); Vanderbilt University (MBA)

Jim Bryson (born July 14, 1961) is an American politician who served as a member of the Tennessee Senate for the 23rd district. Bryson was also the 2006 Republican nominee for Governor of Tennessee, losing to incumbent Democrat Phil Bredesen.

In 2019, Bryson became the Deputy Commissioner of the Tennessee Department of Environment and Conservation for Parks and Recreation.

== State senator ==
Bryson was elected to the State Senate in 2002, serving in the 103rd and 104th General Assembly. He served as Secretary of the Government Operations Committee and as a member of the Senate Commerce, Labor and Agriculture Committee, the Senate Education Committee, and the Fiscal Review Committee. He was noted as one of the Assembly's most vocal advocates of Right to Life and anti-gun control views.

== 2006 gubernatorial race ==
On August 3, 2006, Bryson won the nomination to run for governor against incumbent Phil Bredesen. Bryson, upon entering the race immediately assumed the position of front-runner for the Republican nomination, since the other announced contenders were political unknowns and the state party endorsed him before the primary. Bryson won the nomination with a vote total of about half, approximately equal to that of all of his rivals combined.

Since his Senate district is considered to be the most affluent and reliably Republican in Middle Tennessee, with his re-election all but assured, some have questioned why he would give it up. Any Republican candidate would have been a decided underdog in the general election to Bredesen. In the election of November 2006, Republican Jack Johnson was elected to succeed Senator Bryson.

Bryson was overwhelmingly defeated in the November 7 election, taking only 29.7 percent of the vote. He lost all 95 counties in the state, including Williamson County.

== Personal ==
Bryson was born in Fayetteville, Arkansas. He married Carol Ratcliff, from Greeneville, Tennessee, in 1991. They have four children together: Maria, Nadia, Nick, and Alex. Bryson earned his bachelor's degree from Baylor University and his MBA from Vanderbilt University and is the owner of 20/20 Research, Inc, a marketing research firm with offices in Tennessee, North Carolina, and Florida.

Tennessee Senate
| Preceded by Marsha Blackburn | Member of the Tennessee Senate from the 23rd district 2003–2007 | Succeeded by Jack Johnson |
Party political offices
| Preceded by Van Hilleary | Republican nominee for Governor of Tennessee; 2006 | Succeeded by Bill Haslam |
