= Tennessee Department of Finance and Administration =

Government agency in Tennessee, United States

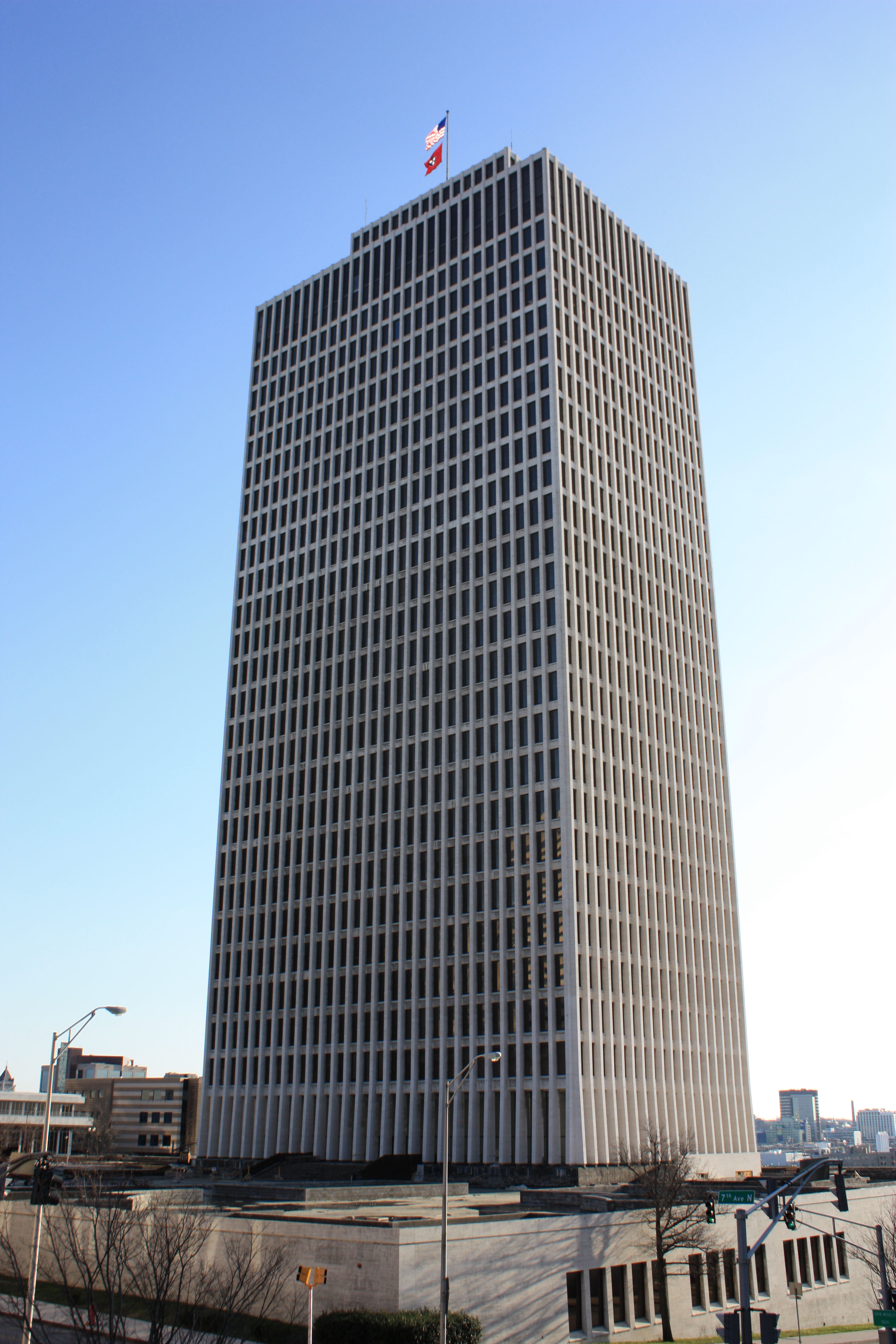
The 21st floor of the Tennessee Tower is where the Department of Finance and Administration's headquarters are located.

The Tennessee Department of Finance and Administration (TDFA) is a state agency of Tennessee. Its headquarters are in the Tennessee Tower in Nashville. Jim Bryson has been commissioner since June 15, 2022.

== Commissioners ==
On June 1, 2013, Larry Martin became the interim Commissioner of the Department. On August 13, 2013, Martin became the new official Commissioner. On November 27, 2018, Governor-elect Bill Lee announced that Stuart McWhorter would become the next Commissioner of Finance and Administration. McWhorter was sworn in on January 19, 2019.

In 2020, Mcwhorter stepped down as Commissioner, to return to the private sector. Later on, he became the commissioner of the Tennessee Department of Economic and Community Development.

On June 15, 2022, former state senator and candidate for governor in 2006, Jim Bryson, became Commissioner.
