= McWhorter School of Pharmacy =

College at Samford University in Alabama, USA

Coordinates: 33°27′52.69″N 86°47′25.34″W

- Type: Private
- Established: 1927
- Parent institution: Samford University
- Location: Birmingham, Alabama
- Campus: Suburban
- Website: Official website

The McWhorter School of Pharmacy is the pharmacy school of Samford University. It was established in 1927, closed in 1929 and reopened in 1932. The school offers a four-year Doctor of Pharmacy (Pharm.D) degree, and is nationally accredited by the ACPE.

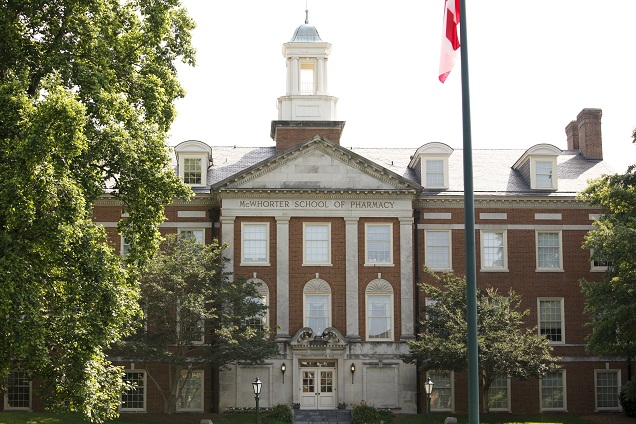
McWhorter-School-of-Pharmacy, located on the campus of Samford University

== History ==
McWhorter was established January 31, 1927 as the Howard College Department of Pharmacy as one of Samford University's ten schools, with a handful of students and a small number of faculty.

The original School of Pharmacy opened in 1927 and closed in 1929 due to national economic difficulty and new accreditation requirements. In 1932, the School of Pharmacy reopened.

In 1995, it was named after R. Clayton McWhorter.
