= 2006 Tennessee gubernatorial election =

- November 7, 2006
- Turnout: 49.97% ▼0.43 pp
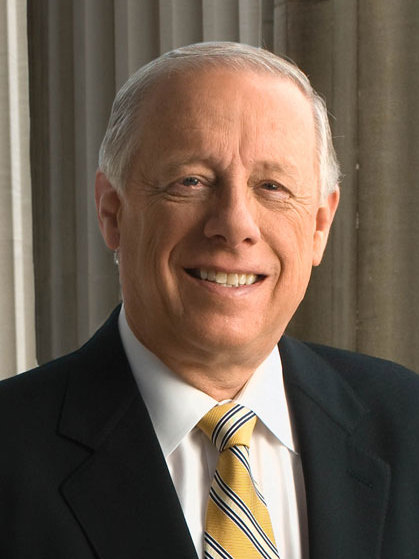

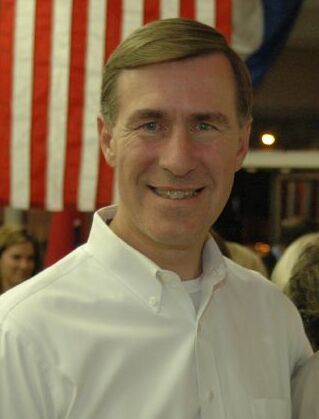
Nominee	Phil Bredesen	Jim Bryson
Party	Democratic	Republican
Popular vote	1,247,491	540,853
Percentage	68.60%	29.74%
- Bredesen: 40–50% 50–60% 60–70% 70–80% 80–90% >90% Bryson: 40–50% 50–60% 60–70% 80–90% Tie: 40–50% No data
Governor before election
Phil Bredesen
Democratic
Elected Governor
Phil Bredesen
Democratic

The 2006 Tennessee gubernatorial election took place on November 7, 2006, to elect the governor of Tennessee, alongside other state and local elections. Incumbent Democratic Governor Phil Bredesen was re-elected to a second term with 68.6% of the vote, defeating his Republican challenger, Jim Bryson. Improving on his performance from 2002, Bredesen also carried every county in the state.

As of 2026, this was the last time a Democrat won a majority of counties in the state, the last time a Democrat won any statewide race in Tennessee, and the most recent statewide election in Tennessee in which 83 of the state's 95 counties voted Democratic. Only Davidson, Hamilton, Haywood, Hardeman, Houston, Jackson, Knox, Lake, Madison, Montgomery, Rutherford, and Shelby counties have voted for a Democratic candidate in a presidential, senatorial, or gubernatorial race since 2006. Eight years after this, Republican governor Bill Haslam would win every county in the state when he won re-election.

== Background ==
Phil Bredesen became governor amid a fiscal crisis, with a predicted state budget shortfall of $800 million. Much of the shortfall was due to TennCare, which was $650 million over budget. Sundquist had hoped to remedy the budget shortfall by implementing an income tax, but this proved wildly unpopular and was never enacted. Bredesen argued that services would have to be cut, saying, "you can't have Massachusetts services and Tennessee taxes." In 2003, he signed a 9% across-the-board spending cut. In 2004, he enacted a series of changes to TennCare, essentially removing 191,000 Medicaid-eligible patients and reducing benefits. By 2006, these changes had reduced the program's cost by more than $500 million. Bredesen used some of the savings to establish a "safety net" for health clinics affected by the cuts. In 2006, he implemented "Cover Tennessee" to cover people with preexisting conditions and the uninsured.

== Democratic primary ==
=== Candidates ===
- Phil Bredesen, incumbent governor of Tennessee
- John Jay Hooker, perennial candidate
- Tim Sevier
- Walt Ward

=== Results ===
Democratic Party primary results
Party	Candidate	Votes	%
Democratic	Phil Bredesen (incumbent)	393,004	88.50%
Democratic	John Jay Hooker	31,933	7.19%
Democratic	Tim Sevier	11,562	2.60%
Democratic	Walt Ward	7,555	1.70%
Total votes		444,054	100.00%

== Republican primary ==
=== Candidates ===
- Mark Albertini
- Wayne Thomas Bailey
- Jim Bryson, state senator
- David M. Farmer
- Joe Kirkpatrick
- Timothy Thomas
- Wayne Young

=== Results ===
County results Bryson: <40%; 40–50%; 50–60%; 60–70%; 70–80%; 80–90%; Farmer: <40%

Republican primary results
Party	Candidate	Votes	%
Republican	Jim Bryson	160,786	50.03%
Republican	David M. Farmer	50,900	15.84%
Republican	Joe Kirkpatrick	34,491	10.73%
Republican	Mark Albertini	29,184	9.08%
Republican	Wayne Thomas Bailey	24,273	7.55%
Republican	Wayne Young	11,997	3.73%
Republican	Timothy Thomas	9,747	3.03%
Total votes		321,378	100.00%

== General election ==
=== Candidates ===
- George Banks (I)
- Phil Bredesen (D)
- Jim Bryson (R)
- David Gatchell (I)
- Marivuana Stout Leinoff (I)
- Charles E. Smith (I)
- Howard W. Switzer (I)
- Carl Two Feathers Whitaker (I)

=== Predictions ===
Source	Ranking	As of
The Cook Political Report	Solid D	November 6, 2006
Sabato's Crystal Ball	Safe D	November 6, 2006
Rothenberg Political Report	Safe D	November 2, 2006
Real Clear Politics	Likely D	November 6, 2006

=== Polling ===
Source	Date	Phil Bredesen (D)	Jim Bryson (R)
Survey USA	October 25, 2006	66%	28%
Survey USA	October 10, 2006	63%	32%
Accuratings	October 24, 2006	67%	33%
The Commercial Appeal	October 3, 2006	63%	22%
Rasmussen	October 3, 2006	63%	28%
Rasmussen	September 7, 2006	58%	31%
Zogby	June 13, 2006	58%	22%

=== Results ===

2006 Tennessee gubernatorial election
Party	Candidate	Votes	%	±%
Democratic	Phil Bredesen (incumbent)	1,247,491	68.60%	+17.95%
Republican	Jim Bryson	540,853	29.74%	−17.85%
Independent	Carl Two Feathers Whitaker	11,374	0.63%	N/A
Independent	George Banks	7,531	0.41%	N/A
Independent	Charles E. Smith	4,083	0.22%	N/A
Independent	Howard W. Switzer	2,711	0.15%	N/A
Independent	David Gatchell	2,385	0.13%	N/A
Independent	Marivuana Stout Leinoff	2,114	0.12%	N/A
Write-in		7	0.00%	N/A
Majority		706,638	38.86%	+35.80%
Turnout		1,818,549		
Democratic hold		Swing		

=== By county ===
By county

County	Phil Bredesen Democratic		Jim Bryson Republican		Other votes
County	%	#	%	#	%
Anderson	72.4%	16,881	25.9%	6,049	1.7%
Bedford	68.2%	7,240	30.3%	3,215	1.5%
Benton	74.8%	4,128	23.1%	1,273	2.1%
Bledsoe	57.8%	2,274	39.6%	1,560	2.6%
Blount	65.4%	23,433	32.9%	11,791	1.7%
Bradley	55.2%	14,492	43.4%	11,401	1.4%
Campbell	67.5%	6,793	30.5%	3,073	1.9%
Cannon	70.4%	2,978	27.6%	1,167	2.0%
Carroll	70.3%	6,379	27.5%	2,493	2.3%
Carter	56.6%	9,211	41.1%	6,686	2.3%
Cheatham	65.3%	7,506	33.3%	3,824	1.5%
Chester	62.6%	2,730	35.5%	1,547	2.0%
Claiborne	62.1%	4,732	35.3%	2,693	2.6%
Clay	69.2%	1,717	27.6%	685	3.2%
Cocke	59.2%	5,741	38.7%	3,752	2.2%
Coffee	68.4%	10,498	29.5%	4,534	2.1%
Crockett	74.0%	3,299	24.4%	1,090	1.6%
Cumberland	61.3%	11,741	37.4%	7,172	1.3%
Davidson	76.0%	132,712	22.3%	38,977	1.7%
Decatur	70.7%	2,791	27.1%	1,068	2.2%
DeKalb	69.8%	3,848	28.3%	1,559	1.9%
Dickson	69.4%	10,016	28.9%	4,164	1.7%
Dyer	69.5%	7,642	28.5%	3,130	2.1%
Fayette	61.8%	7,701	36.9%	4,599	1.3%
Fentress	55.4%	2,859	42.8%	2,207	1.8%
Franklin	71.8%	9,179	26.8%	3,430	1.3%
Gibson	73.6%	11,473	24.9%	3,890	1.5%
Giles	72.0%	6,135	26.3%	2,243	1.7%
Grainger	59.7%	3,289	38.1%	2,100	2.1%
Greene	57.9%	10,669	40.1%	7,376	2.0%
Grundy	70.1%	2,692	26.7%	1,024	3.3%
Hamblen	62.3%	10,377	36.4%	6,057	1.3%
Hamilton	70.3%	75,261	28.5%	30,482	1.3%
Hancock	50.8%	960	46.6%	880	2.6%
Hardeman	75.6%	5,895	22.3%	1,740	2.1%
Hardin	63.6%	4,666	34.3%	2,516	2.1%
Hawkins	60.3%	8,903	37.6%	5,552	2.0%
Haywood	80.0%	4,722	18.5%	1,093	1.5%
Henderson	61.7%	5,293	35.8%	3,072	2.4%
Henry	73.9%	7,289	24.4%	2,402	1.7%
Hickman	70.5%	4,714	27.6%	1,844	1.9%
Houston	77.7%	2,111	20.9%	567	1.4%
Humphreys	76.9%	4,824	21.6%	1,354	1.5%
Jackson	74.0%	2,895	23.6%	924	2.4%
Jefferson	62.5%	8,307	36.0%	4,782	1.5%
Johnson	51.6%	2,491	45.9%	2,214	2.5%
Knox	71.5%	87,537	27.2%	33,266	1.4%
Lake	81.1%	1,252	16.6%	257	2.3%
Lauderdale	75.0%	5,146	22.8%	1,567	2.1%
Lawrence	63.0%	7,843	35.3%	4,399	1.7%
Lewis	63.5%	2,506	32.9%	1,297	3.7%
Lincoln	60.3%	4,890	37.7%	3,059	2.0%
Loudon	66.3%	10,797	32.3%	5,257	1.5%
McMinn	60.3%	8,299	37.7%	5,195	2.0%
McNairy	62.7%	4,855	35.0%	2,708	2.3%
Macon	63.7%	3,507	34.8%	1,917	1.5%
Madison	72.9%	21,889	25.9%	7,771	1.2%
Marion	70.0%	6,162	27.3%	2,407	2.6%
Marshall	72.4%	6,050	26.1%	2,178	1.6%
Maury	69.8%	16,274	29.1%	6,778	1.2%
Meigs	62.6%	2,046	35.4%	1,156	2.0%
Monroe	59.8%	7,484	38.9%	4,876	1.3%
Montgomery	71.0%	25,465	25.6%	9,185	3.3%
Moore	65.1%	1,388	32.8%	700	2.0%
Morgan	68.4%	3,454	29.8%	1,507	1.7%
Obion	76.9%	7,539	20.9%	2,049	2.2%
Overton	73.4%	4,820	25.0%	1,645	1.6%
Perry	71.6%	1,673	25.7%	600	2.7%
Pickett	56.6%	1,205	41.8%	890	1.6%
Polk	62.9%	3,218	34.6%	1,772	2.5%
Putnam	68.9%	13,830	29.3%	5,879	1.8%
Rhea	59.1%	5,004	38.9%	3,297	1.9%
Roane	70.7%	12,389	27.5%	4,807	1.8%
Robertson	67.1%	12,664	31.8%	5,995	1.1%
Rutherford	65.2%	40,034	33.5%	20,535	1.3%
Scott	61.1%	3,230	36.5%	1,931	2.3%
Sequatchie	65.9%	2,761	32.2%	1,351	2.0%
Sevier	57.4%	13,355	38.8%	9,023	3.8%
Shelby	67.4%	210,470	20.7%	64,593	11.9%
Smith	69.4%	4,719	22.6%	1,531	2.9%
Stewart	77.8%	3,314	22.3%	952	3.4%
Sullivan	60.9%	27,024	39.5%	17,479	2.6%
Sumner	62.8%	29,713	33.7%	15,938	2.8%
Tipton	63.2%	10,433	35.5%	5,843	1.3%
Trousdale	78.3%	2,000	21.8%	557	0.0%
Unicoi	61.6%	3,298	39.1%	2,095	1.3%
Union	62.6%	2,743	37.7%	1,653	0.0%
Van Buren	71.7%	1,347	28.3%	533	0.0%
Warren	74.6%	8,324	25.5%	2,848	1.9%
Washington	62.3%	21,092	36.9%	12,360	1.0%
Wayne	55.4%	2,232	45.5%	1,831	1.0%
Weakley	73.5%	7,233	26.6%	2,621	3.3%
White	70.6%	5,231	28.9%	2,140	2.6%
Williamson	58.2%	35,058	42.2%	25,384	1.4%
Wilson	64.5%	23,207	33.3%	11,990	2.2%

==== Counties that flipped from Republican to Democratic ====
- Bledsoe (largest city: Pikeville)
- Claiborne (largest city: Harrogate)
- Hardin (largest city: Savannah)
- Lincoln (largest city: Fayetteville)
- Macon (largest city: Lafayette)
- Pickett (largest city: Byrdstown)
- Rutherford (largest city: Murfreesboro)
- Sumner (largest city: Hendersonville)
- Wilson (largest city: Mt. Juliet)
- Tipton (largest city: Atoka)
- Madison (largest city: Jackson)
- Chester (largest city: Henderson)
- Henderson (largest city: Lexington)
- Wayne (largest city: Waynesboro)
- Williamson (largest city: Franklin)
- Scott (largest city: Oneida)
- Cumberland (largest city: Crossville)
- Meigs (largest city: Decatur)
- Hamilton (largest city: Chattanooga)
- Bradley (largest city: Cleveland)
- McMinn (largest city: Athens)
- Blount (largest city: Maryville)
- Loudon (largest city: Lenoir City)
- Monroe (largest city: Sweetwater)
- Sevier (largest city: Sevierville)
- Jefferson (largest city: Jefferson City)
- Grainer (largest city: Bean Station)
- Hamlben (largest city: Morristown)
- Greene (largest city: Greenville)
- Hancock (largest city: Sneedville)
- Hawkins (largest city: Kingsport)
- Sullivan (largest city: Kingsport)
- Johnson (largest city: Mountain City)
- Washington (largest city: Johnson City)
- Carter (largest city: Elizabethton)
- Unicoi (largest city: Erwin)
- Rhea (largest city: Dayton)
- Fayette (largest town: Oakland)
- Fentress (largest city: Jamestown)
- Lawrence (largest city: Lawrenceburg)
- McNairy (largest city: Selmer)
- Moore (largest city: Lynchburg)
- Union (largest city: Maynardville)
- Weakley (largest city: Martin)

== See also ==
- 2006 United States gubernatorial elections
- 2006 United States Senate election in Tennessee
- 2006 Tennessee elections
