= George G. McWhorter =

American judge

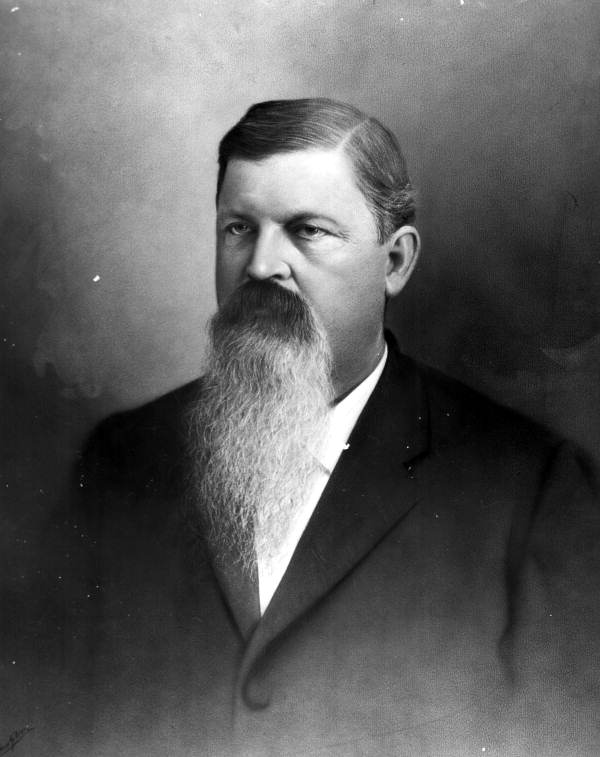
- Born: February 27, 1833; Coosada, Alabama, United States
- Died: May 21, 1891 (aged 58); Santa Rosa County, Florida, United States
- Occupations: lawyer, politician and judge
- Known for: Florida Supreme Court (1885–1887)
- Political party: Democratic
- Spouse: Mary Louise Roche (m. 1856)
- Parents: Alwyn Amzi (father); Sarah Hamlin (mother)

George G. McWhorter (February 27, 1833 – May 21, 1891) was a lawyer and Democratic Party politician who served on the Florida Supreme Court from 1885 to 1887.

McWhorter was born in Coosada, Alabama, in Autauga County, the son of Alwyn Amzi and Sarah Hamlin. He attended college in Alabama and Georgia. He married Mary Louise Roche from Columbia, South Carolina, in 1856, a year before moving to Santa Rosa County in western Florida near Milton. The McWhorters briefly moved to Birmingham, where he practiced law, and returned to Milton in 1859 and was admitted to the Bar. He built a solid reputation as an attorney working for the railroad and local timber companies and arguing cases before the Florida Supreme Court.

Civil War and Reconstruction experiences galvanized McWhorter's political views. He became a leader of the Florida Democratic party and staunchly resisted Reconstruction. In 1876, he was elected to the Florida House of Representatives and became Speaker of the House. He served in the House for two years and left office to campaign around the state for other candidates in the 1880 elections. In 1884, he served as an elector for President Grover Cleveland.

He also supported Edward A. Perry's campaign for governor, and was appointed January 13, 1885, by Governor Perry at a salary of $3,000 per year to replace Chief Justice Randall, who had retired in January 1885. He served on the Bench until July 1, 1887, when he became the chair of the Florida Railroad Commission. He served on the Commission from August 17, 1887, until ill health forced his retirement April 30, 1891. He died at his home in Santa Rosa County, May 21, 1891.
