= Dirk J. Vlug =

United States Army soldier (1916–1996)

- Born: August 20, 1916; Maple Lake, Minnesota
- Died: June 25, 1996 (aged 79); Grand Rapids, Michigan
- Burial place: Greenwood Cemetery, Grand Rapids, Michigan
- Military career
- Allegiance: United States of America
- Branch: United States Army
- Service years: 1941 - 1951
- Rank: Master Sergeant
- Units: 1st Battalion, 126th Infantry Regiment, 32nd Infantry Division
- Conflicts: World War II
- Awards: Medal of Honor

Dirk John Vlug (August 20, 1916 – June 25, 1996) was a United States Army soldier and a recipient of the United States military's highest decoration—the Medal of Honor—for his actions in World War II.

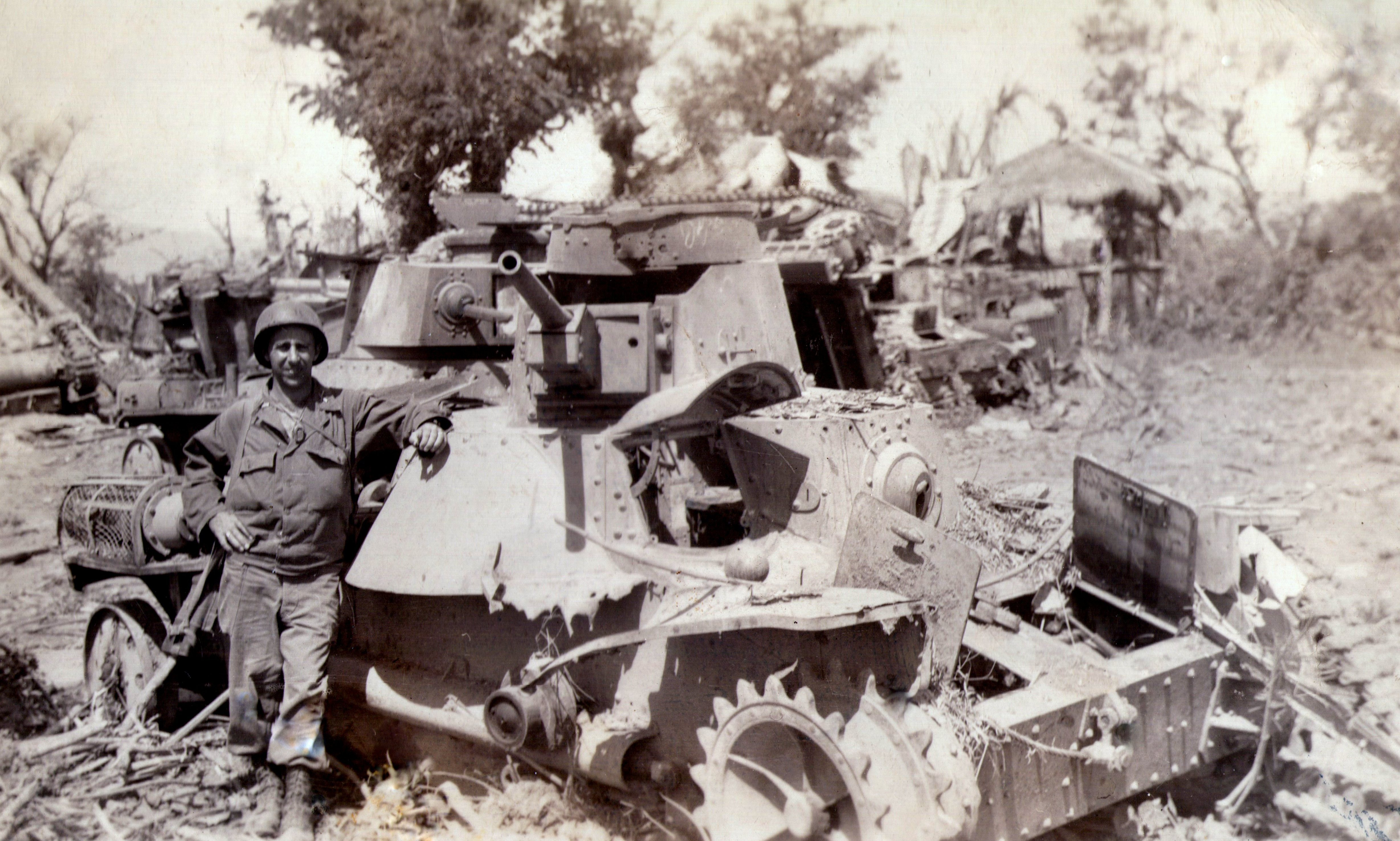
Personal photo taken by Dirk J. Vlug of destroyed Japanese tanks.

Dirk J. Vlug is welcomed home during parade in Grand Rapids, Michigan.

== Biography ==
Vlug joined the Army from Grand Rapids, Michigan in April 1941. On December 15, 1944, while serving as a private first class in the 126th Infantry Regiment, 32nd Infantry Division, near Limon in the Philippine province of Leyte, Vlug single-handedly destroyed five enemy tanks. For his actions, he was awarded the Medal of Honor on June 26, 1946. He left the army and joined the Michigan National Guard in May 1949, retiring with the rank of Master Sergeant in January 1951.

Vlug died at age 79 and was interred in Greenwood Cemetery, Grand Rapids, Michigan.

== See also ==
- List of Medal of Honor recipients
- List of Medal of Honor recipients for World War II
