= R. Clayton McWhorter =

American businessman (1933–2016)

- Born: Ralph Clayton McWhorter; September 27, 1933; Chattanooga, Tennessee
- Died: January 23, 2016 (aged 82); Nashville, Tennessee
- Education: University of Tennessee; Samford University
- Occupation: Businessman

Ralph Clayton McWhorter (September 27, 1933 – January 23, 2016) was an American businessman who was the president and chief executive officer of the Hospital Corporation of America from 1985 to 1987.

== Early life ==
R. Clayton McWhorter was born in 1933. He attended the University of Tennessee from 1951 to 1952, and he received a Bachelor of Science degree in Pharmacy from Samford University in Homewood, Alabama in 1955.

== Career ==
McWhorter worked as an administrator at Sumter Regional Hospital in Americus, Georgia and at West Georgia Medical Center in LaGrange, Georgia. He then worked as an administrator at Palmyra Park Hospital in Albany, Georgia. By 1980, he was executive vice president and, by 1985, he became president and chief operating officer. He then served as president and chief operating officer of the Hospital Corporation of America (NYSE: HCA) from 1985 to September 1987.

McWhorter co-founded HealthTrust in 1987, and served as its chairman and chief executive officer until April 1995. He founded LifeTrust America in 1996, and served as its chairman from October 1996 to November 2004. He served as Chairman of Gordian Health Solutions until its sale. He founded PharmMD in 2008. He also founded Primocare in 2010, where he served as a director. He was the co-founder and chairman of Clayton Associates.

McWhorter served on the board of directors of SunTrust Banks (NYSE: STI) in Nashville, Ingram Industries, StaffMark, Edgewater Technology (Nasdaq: EDGW), and the Corrections Corporation of America (NYSE: CXW). He serves on the advisory board of Harpeth Capital. He has served as chairman of the board of the Metropolitan Nashville Airport Authority.

McWhorter served as president and chairman of the Federation of American Health Systems and a Fellow of the American College of Healthcare Executives. He received the Life Time Achievement Award by Federation of American Health Systems in 1997. He has also served as a director of the Foundation of State Legislatures and as a trustee of the Committee for Economic Development.

== Philanthropy ==
McWhorter received an honorary Doctor of Commerce in 1993. He serves on the advisory board of the McWhorter School of Pharmacy, which is named in his honor, as well as the board of overseers at Samford University. He also serves on the board of trustees of Belmont University in Nashville. At Belmont, he founded the Center for Entrepreneurship in 1996 and later, the Peer Learning Network. In 2010, he donated US$2.7 million to Belmont. Moreover, he served as vice chairman of the board of trustees of the University of Tennessee.

McWhorter has served on the board of trustees of the Middle Tennessee Council Boy Scouts of America, and on the board of United Way of Middle Tennessee for eight years. He started ShoutAmerica in 2008.

== Death and legacy ==
In 1975, The R. Clayton Mcwhorter, a vessel of the Ingram Barge Company was built. It is currently on the Upper Mississippi River.

McWhorter died on January 23, 2016, aged 82.

== Works ==
- Hardy, Owen B.; McWhorter, R. Clayton (1988). Management Dimensions: New Challenges of the Mind. Rockville, Maryland: Aspen. OCLC 755284034.
