= William A. McWhorter =

William Alexander McWhorter
- Born: December 7, 1918; Liberty, South Carolina
- Died: December 5, 1944 (aged 25); Leyte, the Philippines
- Burial place: West View Cemetery, Liberty, South Carolina
- Military career
- Allegiance: United States of America
- Branch: United States Army
- Rank: Private First Class
- Units: 126th Infantry Regiment, 32nd Infantry Division
- Conflicts: World War II
- Awards: Medal of Honor; Purple Heart

William Alexander McWhorter (December 7, 1918 – December 5, 1944) was a United States Army soldier and a recipient of the United States military's highest decoration—the Medal of Honor—for his actions in World War II.

== Biography ==
McWhorter joined the Army from his birthplace of Liberty, South Carolina, and by December 5, 1944, was serving as a private first class in Company M, 126th Infantry Regiment, 32nd Infantry Division. On that day, at Leyte in the Philippines, he smothered the blast of an enemy-thrown explosive with his body, sacrificing himself to protect the man next to him. For this action, he was posthumously awarded the Medal of Honor nine months later, on September 27, 1945.

McWhorter, aged 25 at his death, was buried in West View Cemetery, Liberty, South Carolina.

== Medal of Honor citation ==
Private First Class McWhorter's official Medal of Honor citation reads:

He displayed gallantry and intrepidity at the risk of his life above and beyond the call of duty while engaged in operations against the enemy. Pfc. McWhorter, a machine gunner, was emplaced in a defensive position with 1 assistant when the enemy launched a heavy attack. Manning the gun and opening fire, he killed several members of an advancing demolition squad, when 1 of the enemy succeeded in throwing a fused demolition charge in the entrenchment. Without hesitation and with complete disregard for his own safety, Pfc. McWhorter picked up the improvised grenade and deliberately held it close to his body, bending over and turning away from his companion. The charge exploded, killing him instantly, but leaving his assistant unharmed. Pfc. McWhorter's outstanding heroism and supreme sacrifice in shielding a comrade reflect the highest traditions of the military service.

== Awards and decorations ==

Badge	Combat Infantryman Badge		
1st row	Medal of Honor		Bronze Star Medal
2nd row	Purple Heart	Army Good Conduct Medal	American Campaign Medal
3rd row	Asiatic-Pacific Campaign Medal with 2 Campaign stars	World War II Victory Medal	Philippine Liberation Medal

== See also ==
- List of Medal of Honor recipients
