= 2006 United States House of Representatives elections in Tennessee =

- November 7, 2006

All 9 Tennessee seats to the United States House of Representatives
- Turnout: 49.97% ▼16.35 pp
	Majority party	Minority party
Party	Democratic	Republican
Last election	5	4
Seats won	5	4
Seat change	Steady	Steady
Popular vote	860,861	799,547
Percentage	50.18%	46.61%
Swing	▲3.67%	▼5.71%

Democratic hold
Republican hold
Democratic
40–50%
50–60%
60–70%
70–80%
80–90%
Republican
40–50%
50–60%
60–70%
70–80%
80–90%

The 2006 congressional elections in Tennessee was held on November 7, 2006, to determine who will represent the state of Tennessee in the United States House of Representatives.

Following the 2006 elections, no seats changed hands, leaving the Tennessee delegation at a 5-4 Democratic majority.

== Overview ==
United States House of Representatives elections in Tennessee, 2006
Party	Votes	Percentage	Seats	+/–
Democratic	860,861	50.18%	5	—
Republican	799,547	46.61%	4	—
Independents	55,018	3.21%	0	—
Write-in	6	0.00%	0	—
Totals	1,715,432	100.00%	9	—

Popular vote
Democratic	50.18%
Republican	46.61%
Other	3.21%

House seats
Democratic	55.56%
Republican	44.44%

=== By district ===
District		Incumbent			Results	Candidates
District	2004 CPVI	Representative	Party	First elected	Results	Candidates
Tennessee 1	R+14	Bill Jenkins	Republican	1996	Incumbent retired. New member elected. Republican hold.	▌ ✓ David Davis (Republican) 61.1%; ▌Rick Trent (Democratic) 36.9%; Others: ▌Bob Smith (Green) 0.6%; ▌James Reeves (Independent) 0.6%; ▌Michael Peavler (Independent) 0.5%; ▌Michael Sabri (Independent) 0.2%
Tennessee 2	R+11	Jimmy Duncan	Republican	1998	Incumbent re-elected.	▌ ✓ Jimmy Duncan (Republican) 77.7%; ▌John Greene (Democratic) 22.3%
Tennessee 3	R+8	Zach Wamp	Republican	1994	Incumbent re-elected.	▌ ✓ Zach Wamp (Republican) 65.7%; ▌Brent Benedict (Democratic) 34.3%
Tennessee 4	R+3	Lincoln Davis	Democratic	2002	Incumbent re-elected.	▌ ✓ Lincoln Davis (Democratic) 67.5%; ▌Kenneth Martin (Republican) 32.5%
Tennessee 5	D+6	Jim Cooper	Democratic	1982; 1994 (retired); 2002	Incumbent re-elected.	▌ ✓ Jim Cooper (Democratic) 68.9%; ▌Tom Kovach (Republican) 28.0%; ▌Virginia Welsch (Independent) 2.1%; ▌Scott Knapp (Independent) 1.0%
Tennessee 6	R+4	Bart Gordon	Democratic	1984	Incumbent re-elected.	▌ ✓ Bart Gordon (Democratic) 67.1%; ▌Randy Stamps (Republican) 31.4%; ▌Robert Garrison (Independent) 1.1%; ▌Norman Saliba (Independent) 0.5%
Tennessee 7	R+12	Marsha Blackburn	Republican	2002	Incumbent re-elected.	▌ ✓ Marsha Blackburn (Republican) 66.0%; ▌Bill Morrison (Democratic) 31.8%; Others: ▌Katey Culver (Green) 0.8%; ▌James White (Independent) 0.4%; ▌William Smith (Independent) 0.4%; ▌John L. Rimer (Independent) 0.3%; ▌Gayl Pratt (Independent) 0.3%
Tennessee 8	EVEN	John Tanner	Democratic	1988	Incumbent re-elected.	▌ ✓ John Tanner (Democratic) 73.2%; ▌John Farmer (Republican) 26.8%
Tennessee 9	D+18	Harold Ford Jr.	Democratic	1996	Incumbent retired to run for U.S. Senator. New member elected. Democratic hold.	▌ ✓ Steve Cohen (Democratic) 59.9%; ▌Jake Ford (Independent) 22.2%; ▌Mark White (Republican) 18.0%

== District 1 ==
2006 Tennessee's 1st congressional district election
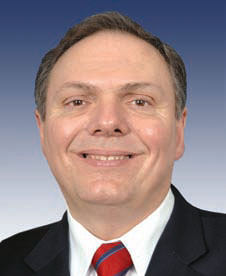

Nominee	David Davis	Rick Trent
Party	Republican	Democratic
Popular vote	108,336	65,538
Percentage	61.11%	36.97%
- County results Davis: 50–60% 60–70% Trent: 40–50%
U.S. Representative before election
Bill Jenkins
Republican
Elected U.S. Representative
David Davis
Republican

Incumbent Republican Congressman Bill Jenkins, approaching his seventieth birthday, declined to seek a sixth term in order to spend more time with his family, creating an open seat. This staunchly conservative district, based in northeastern Tennessee, has been held by Republicans since 1881, one of the longest streaks out of any district nationwide. Republican State Representative David Davis won a narrow victory in the Republican primary and moved on to the general election, where he defeated Democratic candidate Rick Trent, a real estate businessman, and several independent candidates by a solid, but smaller margin than is normally seen in this district.

Notably, Democrat Rick Trent narrowly carried Hancock County.

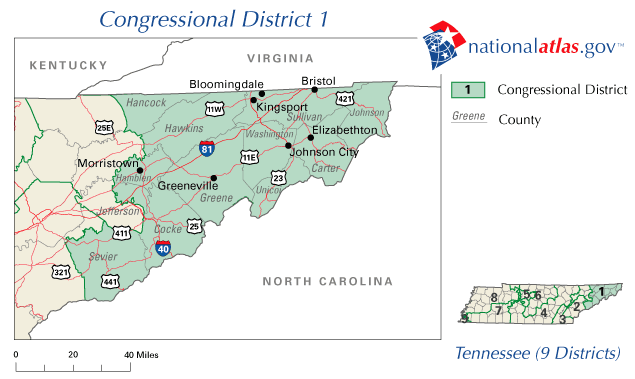

=== Democratic primary ===
- Joel Goodman
- Alan Howell
- Rick Trent, councilman in Morristown
- Dennis Dean Whaley

Democratic primary results
Party	Candidate	Votes	%
Democratic	Rick Trent	6,973	39.8%
Democratic	Alan Howell	4,541	25.9%
Democratic	Joel Goodman	4,105	23.4%
Democratic	Dennis Dean Whaley	1,905	10.9%
Total votes		17,524	100.0%

=== Republican primary ===
David Davis finished first in the strongly contested Republican primary with 22 percent of the vote. The second-place finisher, Richard Venable, received only 573 fewer votes. Tennessee law authorizes a recount in the case of a tie vote, an indication of voter fraud, voting machine malfunctions or tabulation problems, and for "any other instance the court or body with jurisdiction of a contested election finds that a recount is warranted." Venable reportedly had sought a recount because "about seven-tenths of one percent" of the primary votes determined the outcome of the election and because long lines at polling places in Sullivan County had reportedly discouraged voters. The Tennessee Republican Party Primary Board decided not to have a recount, giving the nomination to Davis.

==== Candidates ====
- Peggy Parker Barnett
- Colquitt "C.P." Brackett
- Bill F. Breeding, Jr.
- Vance W. Cheek, Jr.
- Claude Cox
- Douglas Heinsohn
- Richard H. Roberts
- Phil Roe
- David Davis
- John "Jay" Grose
- Dan Smith
- Richard Venable
- Larry Waters

Republican primary results
Party	Candidate	Votes	%
Republican	David Davis	16,583	22.2%
Republican	Richard Venable	16,010	21.4%
Republican	Larry Waters	13,580	18.2%
Republican	Phil Roe	12,864	17.2%
Republican	John "Jay" Grose	7,885	10.6%
Republican	Vance W. Cheek, Jr.	3,334	4.5%
Republican	Peggy Parker Barnett	1,709	2.3%
Republican	Dan Smith	1,087	1.5%
Republican	Bill F. Breeding, Jr.	818	1.1%
Republican	Claude Cox	284	0.4%
Republican	Colquitt "C.P." Brackett	227	0.3%
Republican	Douglas Heinsohn	170	0.2%
Republican	Richard H. Roberts	162	0.2%
Total votes		74,713	100.0%

=== Predictions ===
Source	Ranking	As of
The Cook Political Report	Safe R	November 6, 2006
Rothenberg	Safe R	November 6, 2006
Sabato's Crystal Ball	Safe R	November 6, 2006
Real Clear Politics	Safe R	November 7, 2006
CQ Politics	Safe R	November 7, 2006

Tennessee's 1st congressional district election, 2006
Party	Candidate	Votes	%
Republican	David Davis	108,336	61.11%
Democratic	Rick Trent	65,538	36.97%
Independent	Robert N. Smith	1,024	0.58%
Independent	James W. Reeves	1,003	0.57%
Independent	Michael Peavler	966	0.54%
Independent	Michael Sabri	411	0.23%
Total votes		177,278	100.00%
Republican hold			

== District 2 ==
2006 Tennessee's 2nd congressional district election
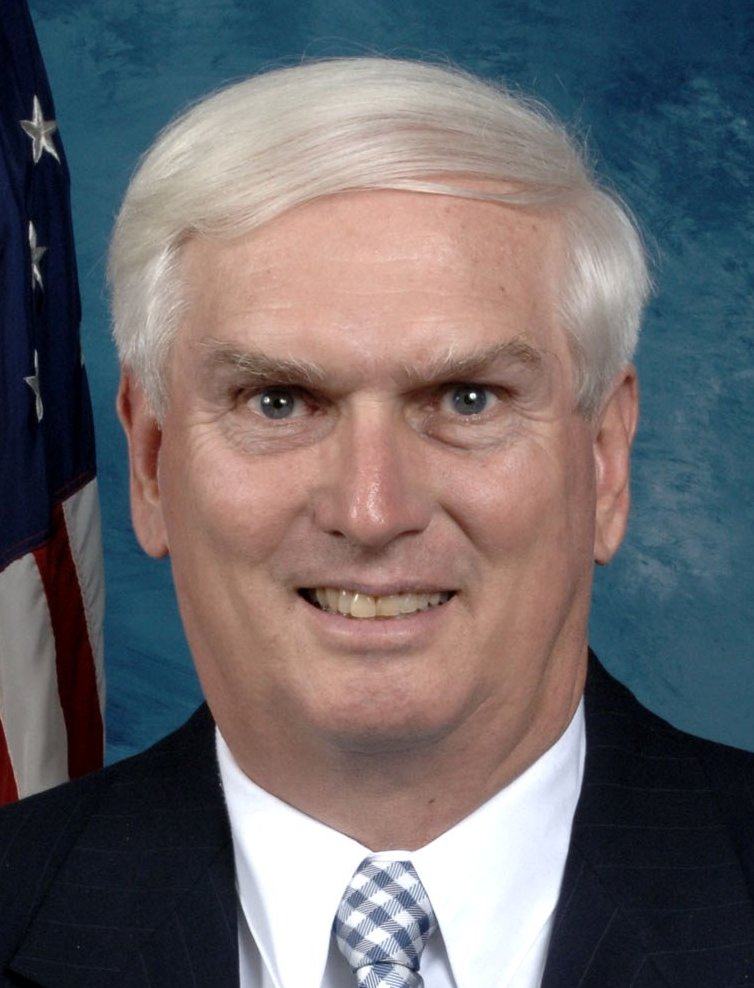

Nominee	Jimmy Duncan	John Greene
Party	Republican	Democratic
Popular vote	157,095	45,025
Percentage	77.72%	22.28%
- County results Duncan: 70–80% 80–90%
U.S. Representative before election
Jimmy Duncan
Republican
Elected U.S. Representative
Jimmy Duncan
Republican

Incumbent Republican Congressman Jimmy Duncan, seeking a tenth term, faced no serious competition from two-time congressional candidate John Greene. This congressional district, based largely in the Knoxville Metropolitan Area, has been continuously held by the Republican Party since 1867 and has a long history of staunch conservatism. Duncan defeated Greene in an overwhelming landslide, as expected, winning another term in Congress.

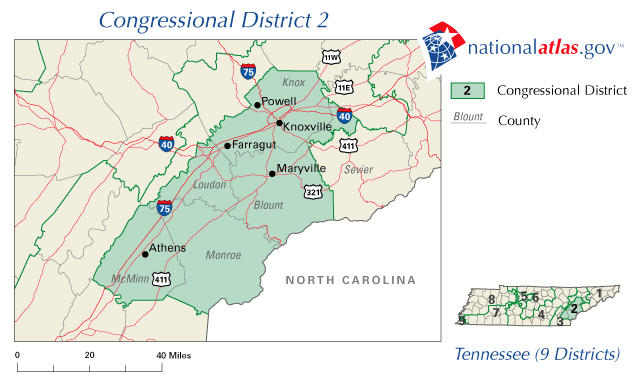

=== Democratic primary ===
- John Greene
- Robert R. Scott

Democratic primary results
Party	Candidate	Votes	%
Democratic	John Greene	9,660	54.5%
Democratic	Robert R. Scott	8,075	45.5%
Total votes		17,735	100.0%

=== Republican primary ===
- John J. Duncan Jr.
- Ralph McGill

Republican primary results
Party	Candidate	Votes	%
Republican	John J. Duncan Jr.	55,295	87.4%
Republican	Ralph McGill	7,994	12.6%
Total votes		63,289	100.0%

=== Predictions ===
Source	Ranking	As of
The Cook Political Report	Safe R	November 6, 2006
Rothenberg	Safe R	November 6, 2006
Sabato's Crystal Ball	Safe R	November 6, 2006
Real Clear Politics	Safe R	November 7, 2006
CQ Politics	Safe R	November 7, 2006

Tennessee's 2nd congressional district election, 2006
Party	Candidate	Votes	%
Republican	Jimmy Duncan (inc.)	157,095	77.72%
Democratic	John Greene	45,025	22.28%
Total votes		202,120	100.00%
Republican hold			

== District 3 ==
2006 Tennessee's 3rd congressional district election
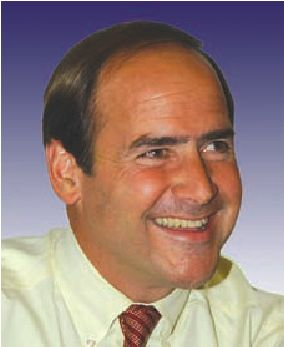

Nominee	Zach Wamp	Brent Benedict
Party	Republican	Democratic
Popular vote	130,791	68,324
Percentage	65.69%	34.31%
- County results Wamp: 60–70% 70–80%
U.S. Representative before election
Zach Wamp
Republican
Elected U.S. Representative
Zach Wamp
Republican

This gerrymandered district, which stretches from the Chattanooga metropolitan area in southern Tennessee to Claiborne County in northern Tennessee, is strongly conservative and had been represented by Republican Congressman Zach Wamp since his initial 1994 election. Seeking a seventh term, Wamp easily dispatched Democratic nominee Brent Benedict to win re-election.

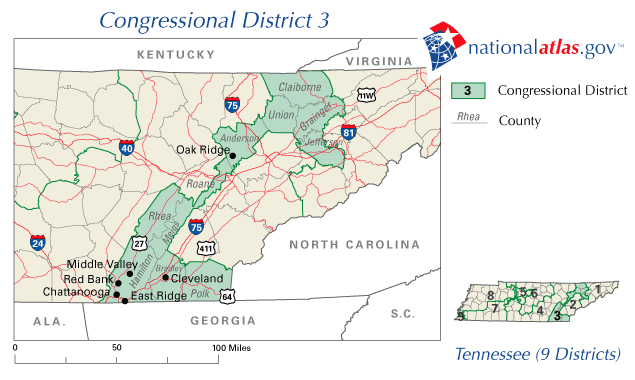

=== Democratic primary ===
- Brent Benedict
- Terry Stulce

Democratic primary results
Party	Candidate	Votes	%
Democratic	Brent Benedict	14,743	51.2%
Democratic	Terry Stulce	14,036	48.8%
Total votes		28,779	100.0%

=== Republican primary ===
- June Griffin
- Charles Howard
- Doug Vandagriff
- Zach Wamp

Republican primary results
Party	Candidate	Votes	%
Republican	Zach Wamp	57,569	87.3%
Republican	June Griffin	3,579	5.4%
Republican	Doug Vandagriff	3,112	4.7%
Republican	Charles Howard	1,702	2.6%
Total votes		65,962	100.0%

=== Predictions ===
Source	Ranking	As of
The Cook Political Report	Safe R	November 6, 2006
Rothenberg	Safe R	November 6, 2006
Sabato's Crystal Ball	Safe R	November 6, 2006
Real Clear Politics	Safe R	November 7, 2006
CQ Politics	Safe R	November 7, 2006

Tennessee's 3rd congressional district election, 2006
Party	Candidate	Votes	%
Republican	Zach Wamp (inc.)	130,791	65.69%
Democratic	Brent Benedict	68,324	34.31%
Total votes		199,115	100.00%
Republican hold			

== District 4 ==
2006 Tennessee's 4th congressional district election
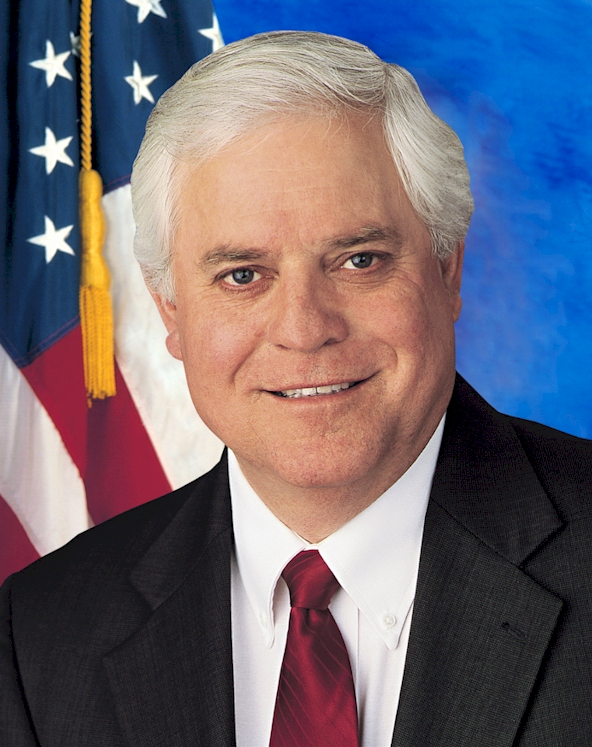

Nominee	Lincoln Davis	Kenneth Martin
Party	Democratic	Republican
Popular vote	123,666	62,449
Percentage	66.45%	33.55%
- County results Davis: 50–60% 60–70% 70–80% Martin: 50–60%
U.S. Representative before election
Lincoln Davis
Democratic
Elected U.S. Representative
Lincoln Davis
Democratic

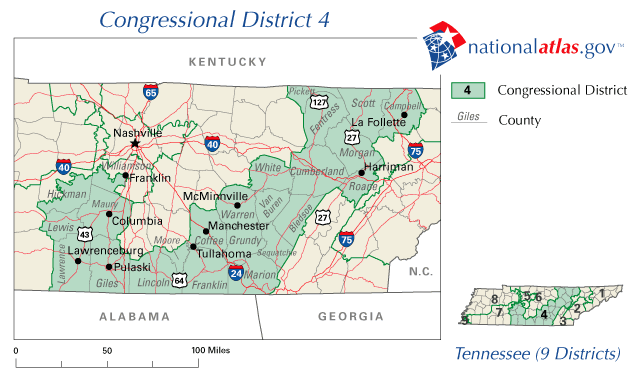

Incumbent Democratic Congressman Lincoln Davis has represented this district since his 2002 election, claiming the seat that Van Hilleary vacated to run for Governor of Tennessee. Though this district has become more conservative in recent years, it has a long history of electing Democratic Congressmen, including Jim Cooper, Al Gore, and Albert Gore, Sr. It stretches from the outer reaches of the Nashville metropolitan area, hugs much of the southern Tennessee border, and shoots upwards to Campbell County in northern Tennessee. Davis ultimately defeated Republican candidate Kenneth Martin in a landslide win to seize a third term in Congress.

=== Democratic primary ===
- Norma Cartwright
- Lincoln Davis
- Harvey Howard

Democratic primary results
Party	Candidate	Votes	%
Democratic	Lincoln Davis	56,618	86.2%
Democratic	Norma Cartwright	6,564	10.0%
Democratic	Harvey Howard	2,511	3.8%
Total votes		65,693	100.0%

=== Republican primary ===
- Kenneth Martin
- Alan Pedigo
- Don Strong

Republican primary results
Party	Candidate	Votes	%
Republican	Kenneth Martin	15,053	41.4%
Republican	Alan Pedigo	11,326	31.1%
Republican	Don Strong	10,017	27.5%
Total votes		36,396	100.0%

=== Predictions ===
Source	Ranking	As of
The Cook Political Report	Safe D	November 6, 2006
Rothenberg	Safe D	November 6, 2006
Sabato's Crystal Ball	Safe D	November 6, 2006
Real Clear Politics	Safe D	November 7, 2006
CQ Politics	Safe D	November 7, 2006

Tennessee's 4th congressional district election, 2006
Party	Candidate	Votes	%
Democratic	Lincoln Davis (inc.)	123,666	66.45%
Republican	Kenneth Martin	62,449	33.55%
Total votes		186,115	100.00%
Democratic hold			

== District 5 ==
2006 Tennessee's 5th congressional district election
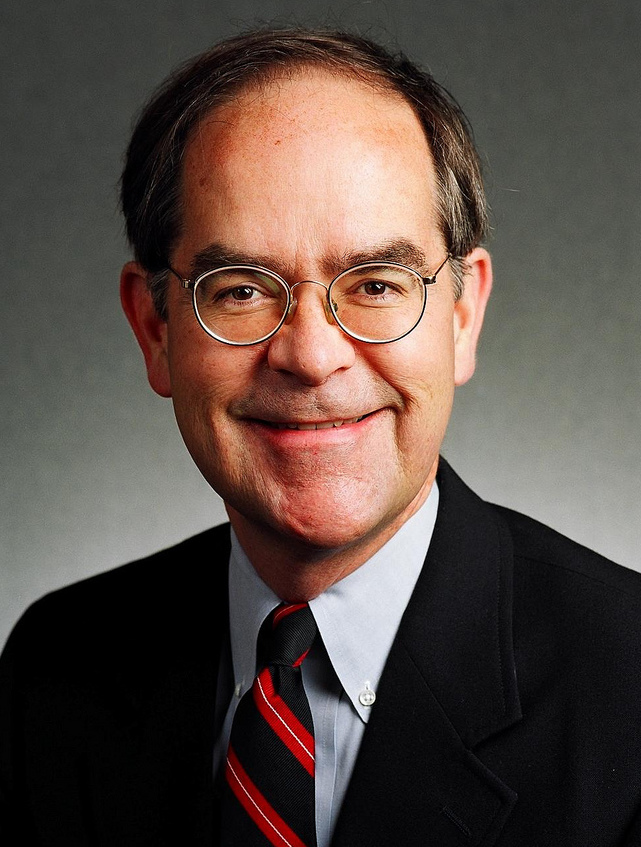

Nominee	Jim Cooper	Thomas F. Kovach
Party	Democratic	Republican
Popular vote	122,919	49,702
Percentage	69.00%	27.90%
- County results Cooper: 50–60% 60–70% 70–80%
U.S. Representative before election
Jim Cooper
Democratic
Elected U.S. Representative
Jim Cooper
Democratic

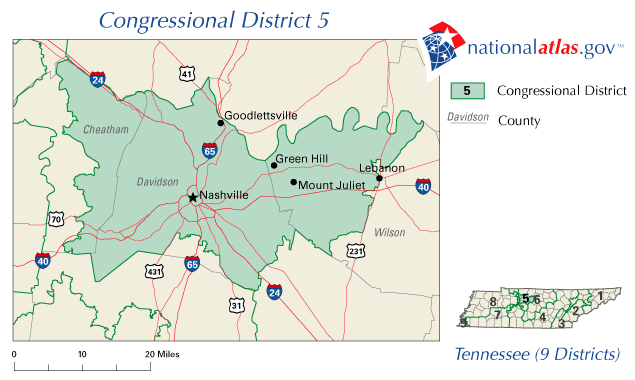

Tennessee’s 5th congressional district was centered on Nashville and included portions of the surrounding area. The district was anchored by the majority of Nashville–Davidson County, making Nashville its largest city and primary population center. In addition to Nashville, the district extended into parts of Cheatham County and Wilson County. This included communities such as Ashland City, Pleasant View, and Pegram in Cheatham County, as well as most of Lebanon, as well as Mount Juliet, and Green Hill in Wilson County.

The district had been represented by Democratic Congressman Jim Cooper since 2002, though he had previously represented an adjacent district from 1983 to 1995. True to the district's liberal tilt, Cooper swamped Republican nominee Thomas Kovach and independent candidate Ginny Welsch to win a third term in Congress.

=== Democratic primary ===
- Jim Cooper
- Jason Pullias

Democratic primary results
Party	Candidate	Votes	%
Democratic	Jim Cooper	38,148	91.6%
Democratic	Jason Pullias	3,518	8.4%
Total votes		41,666	100.0%

=== Republican primary ===
- Thomas F. Kovach

Republican primary results
Party	Candidate	Votes	%
Republican	Thomas F. Kovach	17,113	100.0%
Total votes		17,113	100.0%

=== Predictions ===
Source	Ranking	As of
The Cook Political Report	Safe D	November 6, 2006
Rothenberg	Safe D	November 6, 2006
Sabato's Crystal Ball	Safe D	November 6, 2006
Real Clear Politics	Safe D	November 7, 2006
CQ Politics	Safe D	November 7, 2006

Tennessee's 5th congressional district election, 2006
Party	Candidate	Votes	%
Democratic	Jim Cooper (inc.)	122,919	69.00%
Republican	Thomas F. Kovach	49,702	27.90%
Independent	Ginny Welsch	3,766	2.11%
Independent	Scott Knapp	1,755	0.99%
Total votes		178,142	100.00%
Democratic hold			

== District 6 ==
2006 Tennessee's 6th congressional district election
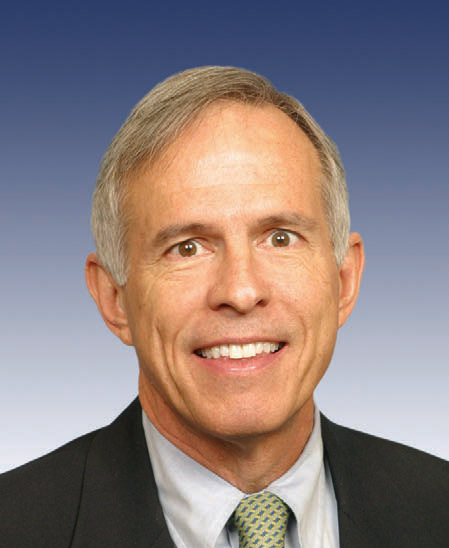

Nominee	Bart Gordon	David R. Davis
Party	Democratic	Republican
Popular vote	129,069	60,392
Percentage	67.09%	31.39%
- County results Gordon: 50–60% 60–70% 70–80% 80–90%
U.S. Representative before election
Bart Gordon
Democratic
Elected U.S. Representative
Bart Gordon
Democratic

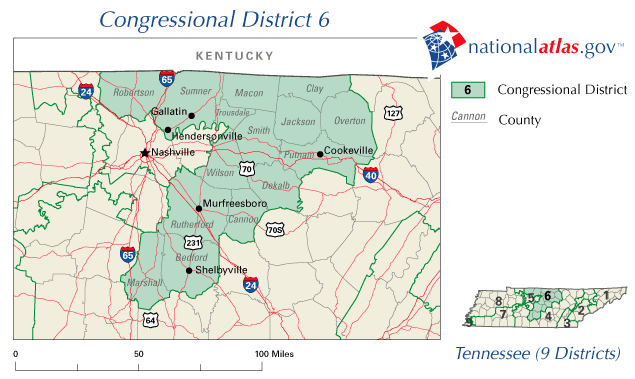

Incumbent Democratic Congressman Bart Gordon, a high-ranking member on the House Science and Technology Committee, sought a twelfth term in this increasingly conservative district based in the eastern suburbs of Nashville. In a testament to Gordon's moderate tenure, his widespread popularity, and the Democratic wave sweeping the country in 2006, Gordon was re-elected again with nearly seventy percent of the vote.

=== Democratic primary ===
- Bart Gordon
- J. Patrick Lyons

Democratic primary results
Party	Candidate	Votes	%
Democratic	Bart Gordon	53,916	92.3%
Democratic	J. Patrick Lyons	4,490	7.7%
Total votes		58,406	100.0%

=== Republican primary ===
- David R. Davis
- Write-in – Steven L. Edmondson

Republican primary results
Party	Candidate	Votes	%
Republican	David R. Davis	27,803	97.5%
Republican	Write-in – Steven L. Edmondson	723	2.5%
Total votes		28,526	100.0%

=== Endorsements ===
Bart Gordon (D)

Individuals

- Wesley Clark, General, 2004 democratic presidential candidate

==== Predictions ====
Source	Ranking	As of
The Cook Political Report	Safe D	November 6, 2006
Rothenberg	Safe D	November 6, 2006
Sabato's Crystal Ball	Safe D	November 6, 2006
Real Clear Politics	Safe D	November 7, 2006
CQ Politics	Safe D	November 7, 2006

Tennessee's 6th congressional district election, 2006
Party	Candidate	Votes	%
Democratic	Bart Gordon (inc.)	129,069	67.09%
Republican	David R. Davis	60,392	31.39%
Independent	Robert L. Garrison	2,035	1.06%
Independent	Norman R. Saliba	884	0.46%
Total votes		192,380	100.00%
Democratic hold			

== District 7 ==
2006 Tennessee's 7th congressional district election
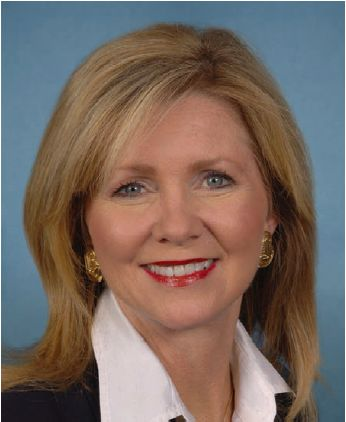

Nominee	Marsha Blackburn	Bill Morrison
Party	Republican	Democratic
Popular vote	152,288	73,369
Percentage	66.05%	31.82%
- County results Blackburn: 40–50% 50–60% 60–70% 70–80% Morrison: 50–60%
U.S. Representative before election
Marsha Blackburn
Republican
Elected U.S. Representative
Marsha Blackburn
Republican

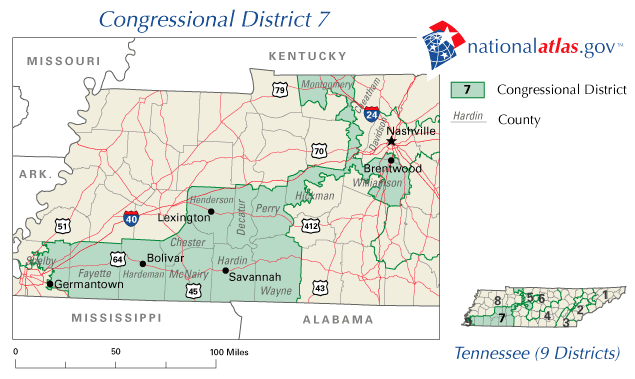

This district, which stretches from the eastern suburbs of Memphis, runs along the southern border of Tennessee, and hugs the western suburbs of Nashville, is the state's wealthiest. Incumbent Republican Congresswoman Marsha Blackburn had represented this district since her election in 2002, replacing Republican Congressman Ed Bryant, who opted to run for Senate. Blackburn was victorious in her bid for a third term, defeating Democratic nominee Bill Morrison and five independents in a landslide.

=== Democratic primary ===
- Randy G. Morris
- Bill Morrison

Democratic primary results
Party	Candidate	Votes	%
Democratic	Bill Morrison	17,080	59.6%
Democratic	Randy G. Morris	11,569	40.4%
Total votes		28,649	100.0%

=== Republican primary ===
- Marsha Blackburn
- Tom Leatherwood

Republican primary results
Party	Candidate	Votes	%
Republican	Marsha Blackburn	63,372	76.9%
Republican	Tom Leatherwood	19,025	23.1%
Total votes		82,397	100.0%

=== Predictions ===
Source	Ranking	As of
The Cook Political Report	Safe R	November 6, 2006
Rothenberg	Safe R	November 6, 2006
Sabato's Crystal Ball	Safe R	November 6, 2006
Real Clear Politics	Safe R	November 7, 2006
CQ Politics	Safe R	November 7, 2006

Tennessee's 7th congressional district election, 2006
Party	Candidate	Votes	%
Republican	Marsha Blackburn (inc.)	152,288	66.05%
Democratic	Bill Morrison	73,369	31.82%
Independent	Kathleen A. Culver	1,806	0.78%
Independent	Mickey White	898	0.39%
Independent	William J. Smith	848	0.37%
Independent	John L. Rimer	710	0.31%
Independent	Gayl G. Pratt	663	0.29%
Total votes		230,582	100.00%
Republican hold			

== District 8 ==
2006 Tennessee's 8th congressional district election
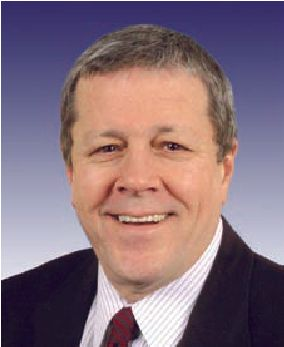

Nominee	John Tanner	John Farmer
Party	Democratic	Republican
Popular vote	129,610	47,492
Percentage	73.18%	26.82%
- County results Tanner: 50–60% 60–70% 70–80% 80–90%
U.S. Representative before election
John Tanner
Democratic
Elected U.S. Representative
John Tanner
Democratic

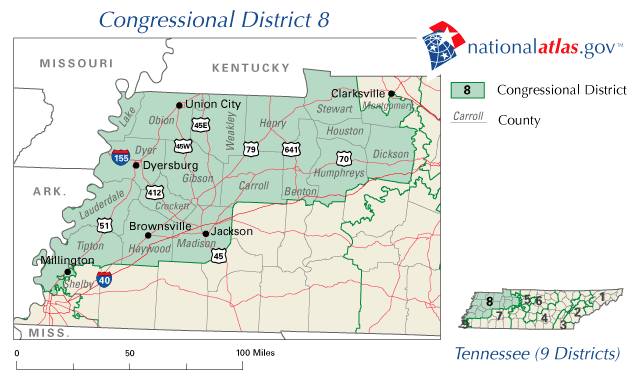

This Republican-leaning district, rooted in the northwestern portion of the state, had been represented by moderate Democratic Congressman John Tanner since 1989. Tanner ran for re-election to a ninth term, and easily defeated Republican candidate John Farmer, carrying every county.

=== Democratic primary ===
- John Tanner

Democratic primary results
Party	Candidate	Votes	%
Democratic	John Tanner	61,764	100.0%
Total votes		61,764	100.0%

=== Republican primary ===
White supremacist and segregationist James L. Heart tried to run again, but Republican state leadership successfully petitioned to have him removed from the ballot on the grounds that he was not a bona fide member of the party. Hart's attorney in the matter was Richard Barrett, the Mississippi white nationalist leader.

==== Candidates ====
- Rory B. Bricco
- John Farmer

Republican primary results
Party	Candidate	Votes	%
Republican	John Farmer	24,753	78.8%
Republican	Rory B. Bricco	6,661	21.2%
Total votes		31,414	100.0%

=== Predictions ===
Source	Ranking	As of
The Cook Political Report	Safe D	November 6, 2006
Rothenberg	Safe D	November 6, 2006
Sabato's Crystal Ball	Safe D	November 6, 2006
Real Clear Politics	Safe D	November 7, 2006
CQ Politics	Safe D	November 7, 2006

Tennessee's 8th congressional district election, 2006
Party	Candidate	Votes	%
Democratic	John S. Tanner (inc.)	129,610	73.18%
Republican	John Farmer	47,492	26.82%
Write-ins		6	0.00%
Total votes		178,142	100.00%
Democratic hold			

== District 9 ==
2006 Tennessee's 9th congressional district election
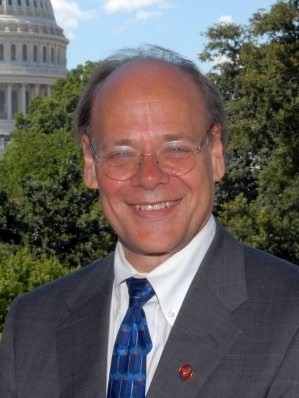

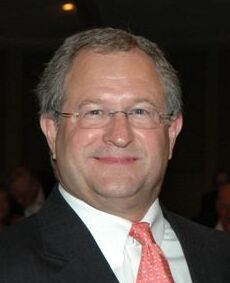
Nominee	Steve Cohen	Jake Ford	Mark White
Party	Democratic	Independent	Republican
Popular vote	103,341	38,243	31,002
Percentage	59.88%	22.16%	17.96%
- County results Cohen: 50–60%
U.S. Representative before election
Harold Ford Jr.
Democratic
Elected U.S. Representative
Steve Cohen
Democratic

This district, based exclusively within the city of Memphis, has the distinction of being the state's most liberal district, the only district contained within one county, and Tennessee's only African-American majority district. Incumbent Democratic Congressman Harold Ford, Jr. opted to run for Senate rather than seeking a sixth term, creating an open seat. Democratic State Senator Steve Cohen won the Democratic primary to replace Ford with a slight plurality, which is tantamount to election in this district. Cohen faced Republican nominee Mark White and Jake Ford, the younger brother of Harold Ford, Jr. Cohen defeated both opponents by a solid margin, and held the distinction of being white and representing a solidly African-American district, a rarity.

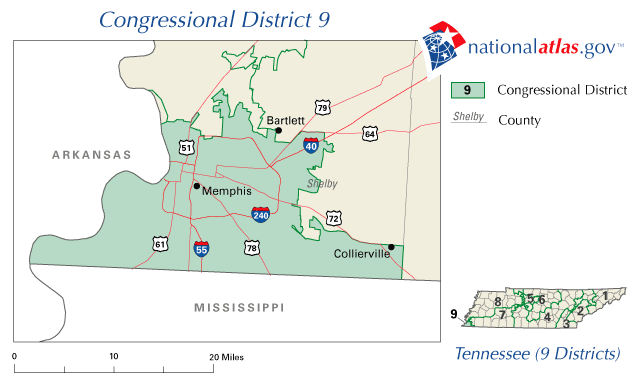

=== Democratic primary ===
- Jesse Blumenfeld
- Julian T Bolton
- Steve Cohen
- Joseph S. Ford Jr
- Ruben M Fort
- Marvell R Mitchell
- Tyson Pratcher
- Ron Redwing
- Lee Harris
- Joseph B. Kyles
- Ed Stanton
- Nikki Tinker
- Joe Towns, Jr.
- Ralph White
- Bill Whitman

Democratic primary results
Party	Candidate	Votes	%
Democratic	Steve Cohen	23,629	30.9%
Democratic	Nikki Tinker	19,164	25.1%
Democratic	Joseph S. Ford Jr.	9,334	12.2%
Democratic	Julian Bolton	8,055	10.6%
Democratic	Ed Stanton	6,927	9.1%
Democratic	Ron Redwing	2,169	2.8%
Democratic	Marvell Mitchell	1,804	2.4%
Democratic	Ralph White	1,700	2.2%
Democratic	Joseph Kyles	1,336	1.8%
Democratic	Scattered	2,241	2.9%
Total votes		76,359	100.0%

=== Republican primary ===
- Derrick Bennett
- Rudolph Daniels
- Tom Guleff
- Cecil Hale
- Mark White

Republican primary results
Party	Candidate	Votes	%
Republican	Mark White	12,132	62.77%
Republican	Tom Guleff	2,949	15.26%
Republican	Derrick Bennett	1,910	9.88%
Republican	Rudolph Daniels	770	3.98%
Republican	Cecil Hale	1,567	8.11%
Total votes		19,328	100.0

=== Endorsements ===
Steve Cohen (D)

Local officials

- W. W. Herenton, mayor of Memphis
- A C Wharton, mayor of Shelby County
Jake Ford (I)

Federal officials

- Harold Ford Sr., former U.S. Representative from TN-09

==== Predictions ====
Source	Ranking	As of
The Cook Political Report	Safe D	November 6, 2006
Rothenberg	Safe D	November 6, 2006
Sabato's Crystal Ball	Safe D	November 6, 2006
Real Clear Politics	Safe D	November 7, 2006
CQ Politics	Safe D	November 7, 2006

=== Results ===
Tennessee's 9th congressional district election, 2006
Party	Candidate	Votes	%
Democratic	Steve Cohen	103,341	59.88%
Independent	Jake Ford	38,243	22.16%
Republican	Mark White	31,002	17.96%
Total votes		172,586	100.00%
Democratic hold			

== See also ==
- 2006 United States Senate election in Tennessee
- 2006 Tennessee gubernatorial election
- 2006 Tennessee elections
- 2006 United States elections
