= Akard =

Akard is a family name. People with the surname Akard include:

- Craft Akard (1917–2015), American politician
- Stephen Akard (born 1964), American diplomat and government official

== See also ==
- Akard station, a DART Light Rail station in Dallas, Texas
