= Jessica Means =

American politician (born 1984)

Member-elect of the Tennessee House of Representatives from the 1st district
- Assuming office January 12, 2027
- Succeeding: John Crawford

Personal details
- Born: October 3, 1984 (age 42)
- Party: Republican
- Children: 6
- Education: Northeast State Community College (AS); East Tennessee State University (BS)
- Website: House website

Jessica Means (born October 3, 1984) is an American politician. A member of the Republican Party, she is the member-elect for the 1st district of the Tennessee House of Representatives.

== Early life and education ==
Jessica Means was born on October 3, 1984. She graduated from Sullivan County High School. She later attended Northeast State Community College in Blountville, Tennessee, where she received her AS, and East Tennessee State University in Johnson City, where she received her BS.

She previously served as a Sullivan County Commissioner.

== Tennessee House of Representatives ==
In 2026, Means ran for the 1st district of the Tennessee House of Representatives, encompassing parts of Sullivan County. She defeated incumbent representative John Crawford in the Republican primary, then won the general election.

== Personal life ==
Means is married. She has six children and two grandchildren and is a homeschooling parent. She lives in Kingsport and attends Arcadia Presbyterian Church.
