= 1996 United States House of Representatives elections in Tennessee =

- November 5, 1996

All 9 Tennessee seats to the United States House of Representatives
- Turnout: 62.77% ▲6.15 pp
	Majority party	Minority party
Party	Republican	Democratic
Last election	5	4
Seats won	5	4
Seat change	Steady	Steady
Popular vote	878,640	847,370
Percentage	49.80%	48.03%
Swing	▼4.97%	▲4.65%

Republican hold
Democratic hold
Republican
40–50%
50–60%
60–70%
70–80%
Democratic
40–50%
50–60%
60–70%
70–80%
80–90%

The 1996 congressional elections in Tennessee was held on November 5, 1996, to determine who will represent the state of Tennessee in the United States House of Representatives.

Following the 1996 elections, no seats changed hands, leaving the Tennessee delegation at a 5-4 Republican majority.

== Overview ==
United States House of Representatives elections in Tennessee, 1996
Party	Votes	Percentage	Seats	+/–
Republican	878,640	49.80%	5	—
Democratic	847,370	48.03%	4	—
Independents	37,748	2.14%	0	—
Write-ins	439	0.02%	0	—
Totals	1,764,197	100.00%	9	—

Popular vote
Republican	49.80%
Democratic	48.03%
Other	2.16%

House seats
Republican	55.56%
Democratic	44.44%

=== By district ===
District	Incumbent			This race	
District	Representative	Party	First elected	Results	Candidates
Tennessee 1	Jimmy Quillen	Republican	1962	Incumbent retired. Republican hold.	▌ ✓ Bill Jenkins (Republican) 64.76%; ▌Kay Smith (Democratic) 32.28%; ▌Dave Davis (Independent) 1.07%; Others: ▌James B. Taylor (Independent) 0.60%; ▌Bill Bull Durham (Independent) 0.49%; ▌John Curtis (Independent) 0.34%; ▌Mike Fugate (Independent) 0.24%; ▌Paul Schmidt (Independent) 0.20%
Tennessee 2	Jimmy Duncan	Republican	1988	Incumbent re-elected.	▌ ✓ Jimmy Duncan (Republican) 70.68%; ▌Stephen Smith (Democratic) 28.57%; Others: ▌Chris Dimit (Independent) 0.61%; ▌George Njezic (Independent) 0.14%
Tennessee 3	Zach Wamp	Republican	1994	Incumbent re-elected.	▌ ✓ Zach Wamp (Republican) 56.30%; ▌Chuck Jolly (Democratic) 42.55%; Others: ▌William Cole (Independent) 0.50%; ▌Walt Ward (Independent) 0.36%; ▌Thomas Morrell (Independent) 0.15%; ▌Dick Sims (Independent) 0.14%
Tennessee 4	Van Hilleary	Republican	1994	Incumbent re-elected.	▌ ✓ Van Hilleary (Republican) 57.90%; ▌Mark Stewart (Democratic) 41.18%; ▌Patrick Lyons (Independent) 0.60%; ▌Preston Spaulding (Independent) 0.32%
Tennessee 5	Bob Clement	Democratic	1988	Incumbent re-elected.	▌ ✓ Bob Clement (Democratic) 72.38%; ▌Steven Edmondson (Republican) 23.84%; ▌Mike Childers (Independent) 3.78%
Tennessee 6	Bart Gordon	Democratic	1984	Incumbent re-elected.	▌ ✓ Bart Gordon (Democratic) 54.42%; ▌Steve Gill (Republican) 41.57%; ▌Jim Coffer (Independent) 4.01%
Tennessee 7	Ed Bryant	Republican	1994	Incumbent re-elected.	▌ ✓ Ed Bryant (Republican) 65.42%; ▌Don Trotter (Democratic) 33.30%; ▌Steven Romer (Independent) 1.28%
Tennessee 8	John S. Tanner	Democratic	1988	Incumbent re-elected.	▌ ✓ John S. Tanner (Democratic) 67.26%; ▌Tom Watson (Republican) 29.92%; ▌Donna Malone (Independent) 2.62%
Tennessee 9	Harold Ford Sr.	Democratic	1974	Incumbent retired. Democratic hold.	▌ ✓ Harold Ford Jr. (Democratic) 61.10%; ▌Rod DeBerry (Republican) 37.26%; ▌Silky Sullivan (Independent) 0.50%

== District 1 ==
Tennessee's 1st congressional district election, 1996
Party	Candidate	Votes	%
Republican	Bill Jenkins	117,676	64.76%
Democratic	Kay Smith	58,657	32.28%
Independent	Dave Davis	1,947	1.07%
Independent	James B. Taylor	1,089	0.60%
Independent	Bill Bull Durham	885	0.49%
Independent	John Curtis	621	0.34%
Independent	Mike Fugate	440	0.24%
Independent	Paul Schmidt	367	0.20%
Write-In	Write-ins	26	0.01%
Total votes		181,708	100.00%
Republican hold			

== District 2 ==
Tennessee's 2nd congressional district election, 1996
Party	Candidate	Votes	%
Republican	Jimmy Duncan (inc.)	150,953	70.68%
Democratic	Stephen Smith	61,020	28.57%
Independent	Chris Dimit	1,306	0.61%
Independent	George Njezic	289	0.14%
Write-In	Write-ins	6	0.00%
Total votes		213,574	100.00%
Republican hold			

== District 3 ==
Tennessee's 3rd congressional district election, 1996
Party	Candidate	Votes	%
Republican	Zach Wamp (inc.)	113,408	56.30%
Democratic	Chuck Jolly	85,714	42.55%
Independent	William Cole	1,002	0.50%
Independent	Walt Ward	718	0.36%
Independent	Thomas Morrell	304	0.15%
Independent	Dick Sims	294	0.14%
Write-In	Write-ins	4	0.00%
Total votes		201,444	100.00%
Republican hold			

== District 4 ==
Tennessee's 4th congressional district election, 1996
Party	Candidate	Votes	%
Republican	Van Hilleary (inc.)	103,091	57.90%
Democratic	Mark Stewart	73,331	41.18%
Independent	J. Patrick Lyons	1,075	0.60%
Independent	Preston Spaulding	561	0.32%
Write-In	Write-ins	5	0.00%
Total votes		178,063	100.00%
Republican hold			

== District 5 ==
Tennessee's 5th congressional district election, 1996
Party	Candidate	Votes	%
Democratic	Bob Clement (inc.)	140,264	72.38%
Republican	Steven Edmondson	46,201	23.84%
Independent	Mike Childers	7,318	3.78%
Total votes		193,783	100.00%
Democratic hold			

== District 6 ==
Tennessee's 6th congressional district election, 1996
Party	Candidate	Votes	%
Democratic	Bart Gordon (inc.)	123,846	54.42%
Republican	Steve Gill	94,599	41.57%
Independent	Jim Coffer	9,125	4.01%
Write-In	Write-ins	1	0.00%
Total votes		227,571	100.00%
Democratic hold			

== District 7 ==
Tennessee's 7th congressional district election, 1996
Party	Candidate	Votes	%
Republican	Ed Bryant (inc.)	126,737	65.42%
Democratic	Don Trotter	64,512	33.30%
Independent	Steven Romer	2,483	1.28%
Write-In	Write-ins	10	0.01%
Total votes		193,742	100.00%
Republican hold			

== District 8 ==
Tennessee's 8th congressional district election, 1996
Party	Candidate	Votes	%
Democratic	John Tanner (inc.)	123,681	67.26%
Republican	Tom Watson	55,024	29.92%
Independent	Donna Malone	4,816	2.62%
Write-In	Write-ins	377	0.21%
Total votes		183,898	100.00%
Democratic hold			

== District 9 ==
Tennessee's 9th congressional district election, 1996
Party	Candidate	Votes	%
Democratic	Harold Ford Jr.	116,345	61.10%
Republican	Rod DeBerry	70,951	37.26%
Independent	Silky Sullivan	957	0.50%
Independent	Mary Taylor	498	0.26%
Independent	Anthony Burton	424	0.22%
Independent	Greg Voehringer	327	0.17%
Independent	Tom Jeannette	222	0.12%
Independent	Del Gill	199	0.10%
Independent	Bill Taylor	179	0.09%
Independent	Johnny Kelly	156	0.08%
Independent	Don Fox	146	0.08%
Write-In	Write-ins	10	0.01%
Total votes		190,414	100.00%
Democratic hold			

== See also ==
- 1996 United States presidential election in Tennessee
- 1996 United States Senate election in Tennessee
- 1996 United States elections
