= Gerald Sensabaugh =

American football player (born 1983)

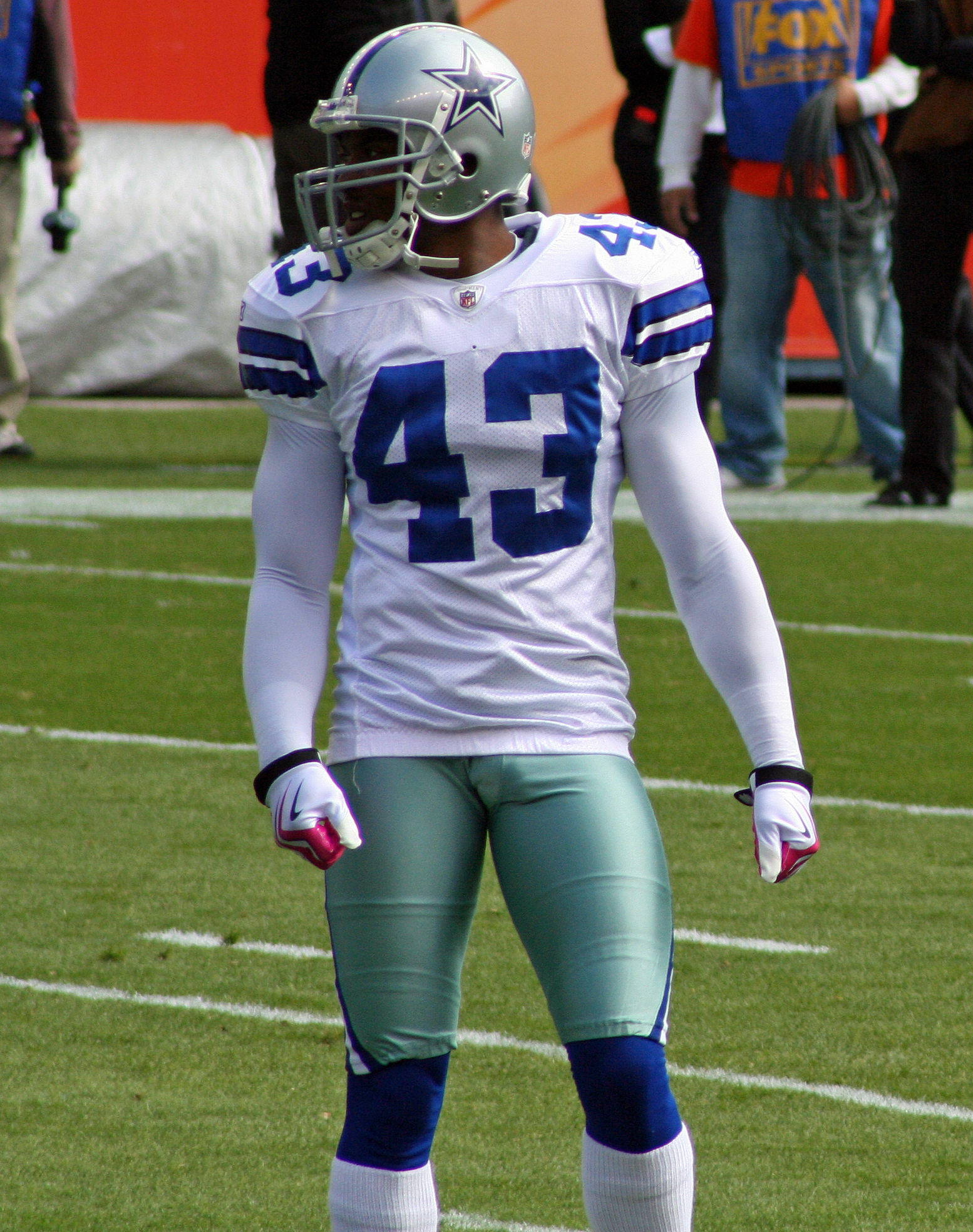
- Sensabaugh with the Dallas Cowboys in 2009

No. 43
- Position: Safety

Personal information
- Born: June 13, 1983 (age 43); Kingsport, Tennessee, U.S.
- Listed height: 6 ft 1 in (1.85 m)
- Listed weight: 212 lb (96 kg)

Career information
- High school: Dobyns-Bennett (Kingsport)
- College: East Tennessee; North Carolina
- NFL draft: 2005: 5th round, 157th overall pick

Career history
- Jacksonville Jaguars (2005–2008); Dallas Cowboys (2009–2012)

Awards and highlights
- Third-team I-AA All-American (2003); 2× All-SoCon (2002, 2003)

Career NFL statistics
- Games played: 112
- Total tackles: 411
- Sacks: 2
- Forced fumbles: 4
- Fumble recoveries: 5
- Interceptions: 14
- Stats at Pro Football Reference

Gerald Lind Sensabaugh Jr. (born June 13, 1983) is an American former professional football player who was a safety in the National Football League (NFL). He played college football for the North Carolina Tar Heels and East Tennessee State Buccaneers. Sensabaugh was selected by the Jacksonville Jaguars in the fifth round of the 2005 NFL draft. He also played for the Dallas Cowboys.

== Early life ==
Sensabaugh attended Dobyns-Bennett High School, where he contributed to the Indians reaching 2 Class 5A Semifinals. As a junior, he was a two-way player, making 10 receptions for 166 yards and one touchdown. As a senior, he tallied 42 receptions for 420 yards and 7 touchdowns. He received All-Big Nine and All-Big East Conference honors at defensive back.

In track, he won the long jump state championship in 2000, with a leap of 7.25 meters. He was also the runner-up in the triple jump, with a leap of 14.05 meters.

== College career ==
Sensabaugh accepted a football scholarship from East Tennessee State University. As a true freshman, he started eleven games at safety, registering 53 tackles (4 for loss), 3 sacks, 2 interceptions, 3 passes defensed and one forced fumble. He had 11 tackles and 2 sacks against Charleston Southern University. He made 8 solo tackles against Georgia Southern University.

As a sophomore, he appeared in 11 games, starting 9 at strong safety. He missed one contest with a broken thumb. He totaled 56 tackles (fifth on the team), 4 tackles for loss, one interception, 3 passes defensed, 2 forced fumbles, 4 fumble recoveries (second in the conference) and 2 blocked kicks. He returned a fumble for a 20-yard touchdown against Wofford College. He returned an interception for a 32-yard touchdown against Western Carolina University.

As a junior, he started at strong safety. He posted 74 tackles (fourth on the team), 2 sacks, 2 tackles for loss, 8 passes defensed, 3 forced fumbles, one fumble recovery for a touchdown and 5 blocked punts (school and conference record). He tied an NCAA single-game record after blocking 3 punts against Georgia Southern University. His blocked kicks led to 15 of his team's 22 total points.

Finished fourth on the team with 74 tackles, had two tackles for losses, two sacks, three forced fumbles, one fumble recovery • Broke up eight passes and had a team-high five blocked kicks • Tied an NCAA record with three blocked punts against Georgia Southern.

As a senior in 2004, he transferred to the University of North Carolina, when East Tennessee State University disbanded its football program. He started at strong safety, registering 78 tackles (led the team), 3 sacks, 6.5 tackles for loss, one interception and 5 passes defensed.

== Professional career ==
=== Pre-draft ===
Pre-draft measurables
Height	Weight	Arm length	Hand span	40-yard dash	10-yard split	20-yard split	20-yard shuttle	Three-cone drill	Vertical jump	Broad jump	Bench press
6 ft 0 1/2 in (1.84 m)	214 lb (97 kg)	32 in (0.81 m)	9 1/4 in (0.23 m)	4.50 s	1.56 s	2.62 s	3.98 s	6.80 s	46 in (1.17 m)	11 ft 1 in (3.38 m)	17 reps
All values from NFL Combine/North Carolina's Pro Day

At the 2005 NFL Scouting Combine, Sensabaugh recorded a best ever in the vertical jump with a 46.0 (inches) vertical.

=== Jacksonville Jaguars ===
Sensabaugh was selected by the Jacksonville Jaguars in the fifth round (157th overall) of the 2005 NFL draft. He was a backup until passing Deke Cooper on the depth chart and starting at strong safety the last 3 contests (including the playoffs). He had 31 defensive tackles and 6 special teams tackles (tied for seventh on the team).

In 2006, he suffered an ankle injury in training camp that forced to miss all of the preseason. He made his first start of the season as team opened up in the nickel defense in the seventh game against the Philadelphia Eagles. He made six starts at strong safety after Donovin Darius was placed on the injured reserve list on November 22. He posted 47 tackles, 2 interceptions (tied for second on the team), one fumble recovery, 11 special teams tackles (tied for third on the team) and one blocked punt.

In 2007, he opened the season as the starter at free safety. He was the starter at strong safety in the second game against the Atlanta Falcons, until suffering a shoulder injury in the first quarter. He played in only 2 games after being placed on the injured reserve list on September 19. He had 8 tackles and one forced fumble. He was replaced with Sammy Knight.

In 2008, he started 13 games (10 at strong safety and 3 at free safety). He made 82 tackles (fifth on the team), 4 interceptions (tied for first on the team), 4 passes defensed, 2 quarterback hurries, 6 special teams tackles (sixth on the team) and a blocked kick.

Sensabaugh was arrested three times while a member of the Jaguars and wasn't re-signed after his rookie contract expired.

=== Dallas Cowboys ===
Based on the recommendation of assistant coach Dave Campo, on March 10, 2009, the Dallas Cowboys signed him to a one-year contract to replace Roy Williams at strong safety. He started 15 games at strong safety, posting 81 tackles (sixth on the team), one interception, 10 passes defensed, 5 special teams tackles and one blocked kick.

In 2010, he appeared in 16 games with 14 starts at strong safety. He recorded 86 tackles (fifth on the team), 2 sacks (tied for fifth on the team), 5 interceptions (tied for the team lead), 9 passes defensed (tied for third on the team) and 4 special teams tackles.

In 2011, he started 16 games at free safety. He finished with 77 tackles (third on the team), 2 interceptions, 4 passes defensed, 2 forced fumbles, 2 fumble recoveries, 4 special teams tackles and one blocked kick. Sensabaugh had signed one-year contracts until December 9, when he received a 5-year contract extension from the Cowboys after years of showing the versatility to play both safety positions and special teams.

In 2012, he started 15 games at free safety. He registered 62 tackles (ninth on the team), 6 passes defensed (tied for third on the team), one forced fumble, 5 special teams tackles and it was the first year as a Cowboy that he didn't register an interception.

On March 4, 2013, Sensabaugh was released from the Cowboys in an effort to save cap space. On May 9, 2013, he signed a one-day deal in order to allow him to retire a Dallas Cowboy. He became a starter upon being signed, missing only two games in his Cowboys career. Each season he dealt with the uncertainty of who would start alongside him at the other safety position, having to play with different teammates including Ken Hamlin, Alan Ball, Abram Elam, Barry Church, Danny McCray and Eric Frampton.

== NFL career statistics ==
Year	Team	GP	Tackles				Fumbles			Interceptions					
Year	Team	GP	Cmb	Solo	Ast	Sck	FF	FR	Yds	Int	Yds	Avg	Lng	TD	PD
2005	JAX	16	24	19	5	0.0	0	1	0	0	0	0	0	0	1
2006	JAX	16	44	37	7	0.0	1	1	0	2	8	4	8	0	4
2007	JAX	2	3	3	0	0.0	0	1	0	0	0	0	0	0	0
2008	JAX	16	70	59	11	0.0	0	0	0	4	38	10	23	0	8
2009	DAL	15	66	47	19	0.0	0	0	0	1	0	0	0	0	8
2010	DAL	16	71	59	12	2.0	0	0	0	5	26	5	10	0	10
2011	DAL	16	75	61	14	0.0	2	2	0	2	11	6	11	0	3
2012	DAL	15	58	42	16	0.0	1	0	0	0	0	0	0	0	3
Total		112	411	327	84	2.0	4	5	0	14	83	6	23	0	37

== Personal life ==
Sensabaugh 's cousin, Coty Sensabaugh, also played in the National Football League. In 2014, he started fishing in the Bassmaster Open Series with Team Leiand and attempted to qualify for the Elite Series.

In 2017, he coached football in David Crockett High School. In October, he was placed on administrative leave, due to an investigation into alleged misconduct. Sensabaugh opted to file a lawsuit against the county for false allegations.

=== Political life ===
In 2018, he ran for Mayor of Sullivan County, Tennessee as an independent where he lost to incumbent Richard Venable 17,307 - 7,507 votes. He also ran for an alderman of Kingsport, Tennessee position in 2021, but placed 8th with only 936 votes.

=== Electoral history ===
2018 Sullivan County Mayor Election
Party	Candidate	Votes	%
Republican	Richard Venable (incumbent)	17,316	69.7
Independent	Gerald Sensebaugh	7,514	30.3
Total votes		24,830	100

2021 Alderman Election
Party	Candidate	Votes	%
Nonpartisan	Paul W. Montgomery	2,918	19.6
Nonpartisan	Collete George (incumbent)	2,264	15.2
Nonpartisan	Betsy M Cooper (incumbent)	2,249	15.1
Nonpartisan	Bob Harshbarger	1,924	12.9
Nonpartisan	Joe Carr	1,674	11.3
Nonpartisan	Sara Buchanan	1,525	10.3
Nonpartisan	Wesley Combs	1,000	6.7
Nonpartisan	Gerald Sensabaugh	936	6.3
Nonpartisan	J.S. Moore	361	2.4
Total votes		14,869	100
