= Jane Myron =

American politician and restaurateur (1950–2020)

Mayor of Johnson City
- In office 2009–2011
- Preceded by: Phil Roe
- Succeeded by: Ralph Van Brocklin

Vice-Mayor of Johnson City
- In office 2007–2009

Personal details
- Born: September 13, 1950 Nashville, Tennessee, U.S.
- Died: March 10, 2020 (aged 69) Franklin, Tennessee, U.S.
- Education: University of Tennessee

Jane Myron was an American politician and restaurateur who served as mayor of Johnson City, Tennessee, from 2009 to 2011.

== Early life and education ==
Myron was born on September 13, 1950, in Nashville, Tennessee. She earned a Bachelor of Arts degree in Home Economics from University of Tennessee and was a member of St. Mary's Catholic Church.

== Career ==
A small business-owner, Myron was the owner of Jane's Lunchbox, a luncheonette specializing in health-conscious traditional Appalachian home-style cuisine.

Myron became Mayor of Johnson City when incumbent, Phil Roe, resigned after winning a seat in the United States House of Representatives. Prior to becoming mayor, Myron had been serving as Vice Mayor from 2007 to 2009. On January 29, 2009, she announced her candidacy for re-election to a four-year term as City Commissioner.

Myron's commission term expired in May 2013. She was succeeded as Mayor by Ralph Van Brocklin.

== Death ==
Myron died on March 10, 2020, in Franklin, Tennessee, at the age of 69.
