= Steve Godsey =

American politician (born 1955)

Mayor of Sullivan County
- In office September 18, 2006 – August 30, 2014
- Preceded by: Richard Venable
- Succeeded by: Richard Venable

Member of the Tennessee House of Representatives from the 1st district
- In office January 14, 1997 – January 11, 2005
- Preceded by: Ron Ramsey
- Succeeded by: Jon Lundberg

Personal details
- Born: June 25, 1955 (age 71)
- Party: Republican
- Spouse: Julie
- Children: 2
- Education: Bristol College
- Occupation: Politician, businessman

Steve Godsey (born June 25, 1955) was the County Mayor of Sullivan County, Tennessee from 2006 until 2014 when Richard Venable was elected. He was also a former member of the Tennessee House of Representatives.

== Early career ==
Godsey attended Tennessee High School in Bristol, Tennessee, followed by Bristol College (now defunct), Appalachian Flight School (defunct), Dana Automotive Technology School, and Cooper Automotive Sales and Mark School. He worked for many years as a small business owner selling used cars.

== State representative ==
A Republican, Godsey represented the 1st District, which encompasses part of Sullivan County, in the Tennessee House of Representatives in the 100th through 104th Tennessee General Assemblies. While in the Tennessee General Assembly, Godsey was at various times a member of the Education Committee, the Transportation Committee, the Commerce Committee, the K-12 Subcommittee, and the Small Business Subcommittee.

== County mayor ==
Godsey was elected to a four-year term as county mayor of Sullivan County in 2006 and won re-election to a second term in 2010. The county mayor is the chief administrative officer for the county. Sullivan County elects its mayors on a partisan basis. As of 2010, the mayor's salary was $101,024. He was defeated by Richard Venable in the 2014 election.

In 2013, to mark the National Day of Prayer, Godsey delivered a speech at the Sullivan County Courthouse in which he railed against Barack Obama, asserting that the president was "embarrassing us" with a "disgraceful" telephone call to National Basketball Association player Jason Collins, who had recently come out as gay.
