= Phil Roe (politician) =

American politician (born 1945)

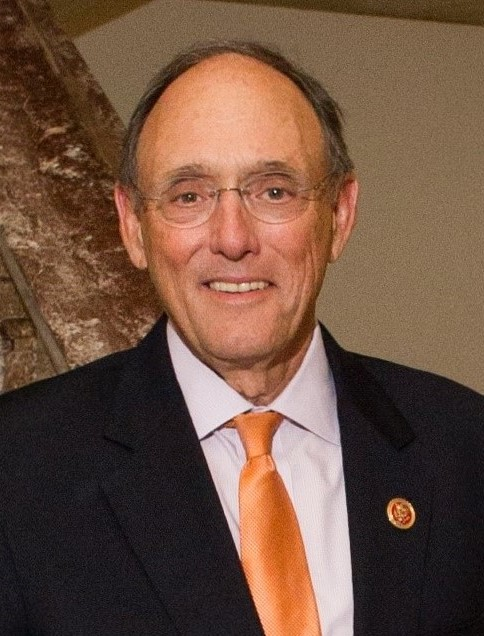
- Official portrait, 2016

Ranking Member of the House Veterans' Affairs Committee
- In office January 3, 2019 – January 3, 2021
- Preceded by: Tim Walz
- Succeeded by: Mike Bost

Chair of the House Veterans' Affairs Committee
- In office January 3, 2017 – January 3, 2019
- Preceded by: Jeff Miller
- Succeeded by: Mark Takano

Member of the U.S. House of Representatives from Tennessee's 1st district
- In office January 3, 2009 – January 3, 2021
- Preceded by: David Davis
- Succeeded by: Diana Harshbarger

Mayor of Johnson City
- In office 2007–2009
- Preceded by: Steve Darden
- Succeeded by: Jane Myron

Personal details
- Born: David Phillip Roe; July 21, 1945 (age 81) Clarksville, Tennessee, U.S.
- Party: Republican
- Spouses: Pam Alford (m. 1995; died 2015); Clarinda Jeanes (m. 2017)
- Children: 3
- Education: Austin Peay State University (BS); University of Tennessee (MD)

Military service
- Branch: United States Army
- Years of service: 1972–1974
- Rank: Major
- Unit: Army Medical Corps
- Roe's voice Roe on the Veterans Appeals Improvement and Modernization Act of 2017. Recorded May 23, 2017

David Phillip Roe (born July 21, 1945) is an American politician and physician who was the U.S. representative for Tennessee's 1st congressional district, serving from 2009 to 2021. He is a member of the Republican Party. From 2017 to 2019, Roe was chairman of the House Committee on Veterans Affairs.

Roe announced in January 2020 that he would not run for re-election in 2020.

== Early life and education ==
Roe was born on July 21, 1945, in Clarksville, Tennessee. He graduated from Austin Peay State University in 1967 and earned his Medical Degree from the University of Tennessee College of Medicine in 1972.

== Medical career ==
After graduating from medical school, Roe served as a United States Army Medical Corps officer attached to the 2nd Infantry Division at Camp Casey, South Korea. Honorably discharged as a major in 1974, He then went into OB/GYN practice in Johnson City, retiring after 31 years, including his work as a physician at State of Franklin Healthcare Associates (SOFHA). SOFHA was founded in 1997. Roe delivered close to 5,000 babies throughout those 31 years.

== Political career ==
Roe was first elected to the Johnson City Commission in 2003, serving as vice mayor of Johnson City from 2003–2007 (preceded by C. H. Charlton and succeeded by Jane Myron) and then as mayor from 2007 to 2009.

== U.S. House of Representatives ==
=== Elections ===
2008

2008 Republican primary results Roe: 50–60%; Davis: 50–60%; 60–70%

Roe defeated incumbent congressman David Davis in the 2008 primary by 500 votes. Davis blamed his loss on votes from Democrats who crossed over to vote for Roe in the open primary. Roe had previously run for the seat in 2006 when 10-year incumbent Bill Jenkins announced his retirement, but lost to Davis in that year's primary.

Roe defeated Democratic nominee Rob Russell, director of the Writing and Communication Center at East Tennessee State University, in the November general election with 72 percent of the vote. However, it was widely presumed that Roe had clinched a seat in Congress with his victory in the primary. The 1st, anchored in the Tri-Cities region, is one of the few ancestrally Republican districts in the South; the GOP has held it continuously since 1881, and for all but four years since 1859.

Shortly after his successful bid to represent the 1st District, Roe was interviewed by "Believe It, Achieve It," a DC-based radio program aimed at promoting youth interest in politics. The interview featured Roe conversing with a robot on topics ranging from health and fitness to the death of Michael Jackson.

2010

Roe won re-election in 2010 with 80.8% of the vote against Democratic nominee Michael Clark.

=== Tenure ===
The 1st is known for giving its congressmen very long tenures in Washington; Roe was only the eighth person to hold the seat in 88 years.

Roe hired Andrew Duke, a former chief of staff for North Carolina Republican congressman Robin Hayes, as his chief of staff. According to National Journal’s 2009 Vote Ratings, he was ranked as the 101st conservative in the House.

On February 5, 2013, Roe introduced the National Desert Storm and Desert Shield War Memorial Act (H.R. 503; 113th Congress) into the House. The bill would authorize the National Desert Storm Memorial Association to establish a memorial to honor members of the armed forces who participated in Operation Desert Storm or Operation Desert Shield. Roe said "I believe we should honor the commitment of every man and woman that honorably serves this country, and I am proud to see this bill move forward."

During June 2013, WJHL-TV in Johnson City reported that Roe had written a letter to the federal court in Greeneville on the behalf of Dr. William Kincaid, who had pleaded guilty to one count of receiving in interstate commerce a misbranded drug. Federal prosecutors under the Independent Payment Advisory Board argued that Dr. Kincaid's driving forces for breaking the law were "money and greed" and because that decision by Kincaid created a "substantial risk of harm to patients," prosecutors also said Kincaid should spend the maximum three years behind bars for fraudulently obtaining federal reimbursement as a healthcare provider.

Roe had initially promised to serve only five terms (10 years) in Congress. However, on February 6, 2018; he announced he would run for a sixth term, saying that he needed to continue the work begun when he became chairman of the House Veterans Affairs Committee.

=== Committee assignments ===
- Committee on Veterans' Affairs (Ranking member)
- Committee on Education and the Workforce
  - Subcommittee on Early Childhood, Elementary and Secondary Education
  - Subcommittee on Health, Employment, Labor, and Pensions

=== Caucus memberships ===
- United States Congressional International Conservation Caucus
- Physician's Caucus
- Republican Study Committee
- Sportsmen's Caucus
- Tea Party Caucus
- Congressional Arts Caucus
- Academic Medicine Caucus

== Personal life ==
Roe resides in Jonesborough with his wife Clarinda, who is the sister of Congressman Mike Kelly’s wife.

== Honors ==
- American Legion Distinguished Service Medal, August 30, 2022

== See also ==
- List of members of the American Legion
- Physicians in US Congress
- List of mayors of Johnson City, Tennessee

Political offices
Preceded by Steve Darden	Mayor of Johnson City; 2007–2009	Succeeded by Jane Myron
U.S. House of Representatives
Preceded by David Davis	Member of the U.S. House of Representatives from Tennessee's 1st congressional district 2009–2021	Succeeded by Diana Harshbarger
Preceded by Jeff Miller	Chair of the House Veterans' Affairs Committee; 2017–2019	Succeeded by Mark Takano
Preceded by Tim Walz	Ranking Member of the House Veterans' Affairs Committee; 2019–2021	Succeeded by Mike Bost
U.S. order of precedence (ceremonial)
Preceded by David Cicilline as Former U.S. Representative	Order of precedence of the United States as Former U.S. Representative	Succeeded by Dennis Eckart as Former U.S. Representative
