= Bristol University (Tennessee) =

Bristol University, previously Bristol College, was a proprietary higher education institution in Bristol, Tennessee, that closed in 1994.

The school specialized in business education. As of 1989, it operated in both Bristol and Knoxville, Tennessee and enrolled a total of approximately 350 students in the two locations. It also operated in Indianapolis, Indiana, from 1991 to 1994. There was also a satellite campus located in Johnson City, Tennessee.

== History ==
The institution was started in 1895.

Jack O. Anderson became president of Bristol College in 1969 and remained on its board until 1988.

Ron Cosby, president and owner of the for-profit institution known in 1988 as Bristol University, had planned to register it as a non-profit. A year later, however, Cosby sold the school (which carried a debt of $87,000) to Craven Sumerell of South Carolina. The purchase price was reportedly $73,000.

By this time, Sumerell had already been plagued with complications and litigation associated with operating a management program and a small college. Going by Dr. Craven Sumerell, he acquired his doctorate from Columbia Pacific University (a correspondence school in California that had no accreditation). In 1979, Sumerell entered a contract with Limestone College to operate an off-campus management program. In May 1988, that contract was not renewed, and Limestone sued Sumerell for violating that contract, which required Sumerell to "deposit tuition in Gaffney banks...[and] pay the college twenty percent of all tuition and supply financial reports to the college." Limestone College was awarded $350,000.

The same year Sumerell left Limestone, he founded and operated American Management College in Spartanburg, South Carolina, which closed in February 1989 when it failed to meet licensing requirements of the South Carolina Commission on Higher Education. According to The Gaffney Ledger, "the commission cited numerous deficiencies in the college's operations, including no standardized exams, no core of fulltime faculty and inflated grades for students." American Management College's records were transferred to Bristol University.

In May 1994, after multiple litigations and an investigation by the Tennessee Higher Education Commission, Bristol University closed. Craven Sumerell and his wife filed for bankruptcy in 1995.

== Legacy ==
Students who attended the Bristol University location in Indianapolis, Indiana, can obtain transcripts and degree information from the Indiana Commission on Proprietary Education.

== Sports ==
Bristol University Men's Baseball team won the 1989 and 1990 National Small College Athletic Association (NSCAA) Championships in McPherson, Kansas with Gerald Opp as head coach and went on to win the 1993 and 1994 NSCAA National Championships in Tyler, Texas with Gil Payne as head coach. At times during its history, Bristol College fielded a men's basketball team. In the 1985-86 season the team compiled a record of 30 wins and 13 losses and was the National Little College National Association National Champion, the team was coached by Brien "Briefcase" Crowder

== Notable alumni ==
Notable people who attended Bristol College or University include

- Steve Godsey.
- Tim Stacy.
