= John Crawford (Tennessee politician) =

American politician (born 1967)

Member of the Tennessee House of Representatives from the 1st district
- Incumbent
- Assumed office January 10, 2017
- Preceded by: Jon Lundberg
- Succeeded by: Jessica Means (elect)

Personal details
- Born: November 29, 1967 (age 58)
- Party: Republican
- Spouse: LeAnn Crawford
- Children: 1
- Education: East Tennessee State University
- Website: House website

John Crawford (born November 29, 1967) is an American politician. A member of the Republican Party, he has represents District 1 in the Tennessee House of Representatives since 2017.

== Tenure ==
In 2023, the Tennessee House voted on motions to remove three sitting Democratic representatives — Gloria Johnson, Justin Jones, and Justin J. Pearson — for disrupting proceedings with a protest as citizens were at the capitol voicing their outrage over a mass shooting at a Nashville school that left six dead.

Crawford voted in favor of all three resolutions: HR 63, to remove Pearson; HR 64, to remove Johnson; and HR 65, to remove Jones. Pearson and Jones were expelled, while Johnson was not.

== Personal information ==
John Crawford was born on November 29, 1967. Crawford married his wife LeAnn and he has one daughter with her which her name is Jessica. They are Baptists. Crawford attended Kingsport Christian School and studied Business and Psychology at East Tennessee State University. Crawford is also the CFO of Able Printers, a commercial printing company.
