= Richard Venable =

American politician from Tennessee (born 1944)

Mayor of Sullivan County
- Incumbent
- Assumed office August 30, 2014
- Preceded by: Steve Godsey

Member of the Tennessee House of Representatives from the 3rd district
- In office January 8, 1991 – January 7, 1997
- Preceded by: Ralph Yelton
- Succeeded by: Jason Mumpower

Personal details
- Born: October 2, 1944 (age 81)
- Party: Republican

Richard Venable (born October 2, 1944) is an American politician. He is county mayor of Sullivan County, Tennessee and is a former member of the Tennessee House of Representatives. While county mayor, he is chairman of the Sullivan County Board of Commissioners commonly called the County Commission. He lost his Republican Party nomination bid in first congressional district race to replace the retiring Bill Jenkins to David Davis.
