= Craft Akard =

American politician (1917–2015)

J. Craft Akard

Member of the Tennessee House of Representatives from the 1st district
- In office 1981–1982
- Preceded by: Clarence Blackburn Jr.
- Succeeded by: Dana E. Moore

Personal details
- Born: January 17, 1917 Blountville, Tennessee, U.S.
- Died: March 27, 2015 (aged 98) Bristol, Tennessee, U.S.
- Spouse: Margaret Akard
- Children: 2
- Occupation: educator, baseball player

James Craft "Lefty" Akard (January 17, 1917 – March 27, 2015) was an American politician in the state of Tennessee. Akard served in the Tennessee House of Representatives from 1981 to 1982. He was a former educator, having served as Superintendent of Sullivan County Schools from 1948 to 1971, and as Field Representative for the Tennessee Board of Education from 1971 to 1979. He was elected to the Tennessee House of Representatives in 1981 as a Democrat, representing the 1st district, encompassing Sullivan County. He did not run for reelection upon the expiration of his term, stating, "to be perfectly honest, I don't believe I can be an effective legislator because the role is not in keeping with my background and temperament".

He graduated from Emory & Henry College in 1938, where he played baseball and basketball. He later played professional baseball for the Johnson City Soldiers, Bristol Twins, Kingsport Cherokees and Newport Canners of the Appalachian League, with his career lasting from 1938 to 1945. He and his wife Margaret had two children. He died in 2015.
