= David Davis (Tennessee politician) =

American politician (born 1959)

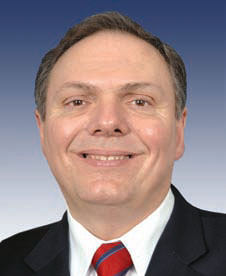

Member of the U.S. House of Representatives from Tennessee's 1st district
- In office January 3, 2007 – January 3, 2009
- Preceded by: Bill Jenkins
- Succeeded by: Phil Roe

Member of the Tennessee House of Representatives from the 6th district
- In office 1999–2007
- Preceded by: Bobby Hicks
- Succeeded by: Dale Ford

Personal details
- Born: David Lee Davis; November 6, 1959 (age 67) Unicoi, Tennessee, U.S.
- Party: Republican
- Spouse: Joyce Davis
- Children: 2
- Education: Independence University; Milligan College (BS)

David Lee Davis (born November 6, 1959) is an American Republican politician from Tennessee and one-term member (2007–2009) of the United States House of Representatives and Tennessee House of Representatives. He represented Tennessee's 1st congressional district, located in the northeastern portion of the state and centered on the Tri-Cities area, but was narrowly defeated in the 2008 primary by Johnson City Mayor Phil Roe.

== Early career ==
David Davis obtained a 13-week certification in respiratory therapy from East Tennessee State University in 1979 and received a correspondence A.A.S. in respiratory therapy from California College in 1983. In 1991, he received a B.S. in Organizational Management from Milligan College. He is currently president of Shared Health Services, Inc. and the former president of Advanced Home Health Care, Inc.

== Tennessee House of Representatives ==
In 1998, Davis was elected to the 101st General Assembly representing the 6th district in the Tennessee House of Representatives, which comprises parts of Sullivan, Washington and Hawkins counties. Davis was a member of the Transportation Committee, the Government Operations Committee, and the Public Safety and Rural Roads Subcommittee while serving with the Tennessee General Assembly. Davis was unopposed in his initial election and was reelected three more times with no major-party opposition.

Davis was also a delegate to the White House Conference on Small Business.

While in the state house, Davis voted aye twice in transportation committee to allow illegal immigrants to apply for Tennessee driver licenses (2001 H.B. 983) and also filed legislation on February 3, 2005 (2005 H.B 714) for changing county wheel tax legislation that (if enacted) would have taken away the ability of Tennessee citizens to vote aye or nay on local wheel tax referendum questions and give Tennessee county commissioners the sole authority to enact wheel taxes with a simple majority vote.

== U.S. House of Representatives ==
=== Elections ===
2006

In 2006, Davis gave up his seat in the state house to run for the 1st Congressional District. That district's five-term incumbent, fellow Republican Bill Jenkins, had recently announced his retirement. In May, Davis appointed then Leitner Pharmaceuticals lobbyist (and former King Pharmaceuticals lobbyist) James "Jim" L. Holcomb, who was also the treasurer of the Tennessee Conservative PAC, as his campaign co-chairman.

Davis finished first in the strongly contested Republican primary with 22 percent of the vote. The second-place finisher, Richard Venable, received only 573 fewer votes. Tennessee law authorizes a recount in the case of a tie vote, an indication of voter fraud, voting machine malfunctions or tabulation problems, and for "any other instance the court or body with jurisdiction of a contested election finds that a recount is warranted." Venable reportedly had sought a recount because "about seven-tenths of one percent" of the primary votes determined the outcome of the election and because long lines at polling places in Sullivan County had reportedly discouraged voters. The Tennessee Republican Party Primary Board decided not to have a recount, giving the nomination to Davis.

In the November general election, Davis defeated his Democratic opponent, Morristown City Councilman Rick Trent with 61% of the vote. It was generally believed, however, that Davis had assured himself of a seat in Congress with his primary victory. The 1st district is one of the most Republican-leaning districts in the nation; Republicans have held it continuously since 1881, and for all but four years since 1859.

2008

2008 Republican primary results Roe: 50–60%; Davis: 50–60%; 60–70%

In 2008, Davis sought reelection to a second term. However, he lost the Republican primary, held on August 7, 2008, to Johnson City Mayor Phil Roe. Davis lost by 500 votes, or less than one percent. During the campaign, Roe attacked Davis as an ineffective politician who had sold out to special interests and accepted contributions from oil companies during a summer of record gasoline prices.

It was the first time since 1966 that an incumbent Tennessee congressman had lost a primary. It was also the first time since 1950 that an incumbent congressman lost a primary in the 1st District. Davis claimed Democratic voters, knowing they had no realistic chance of defeating him in November, contributed to his primary loss by crossing over to vote for Roe in the Republican primary. He believed he was the winner among voters who identify as Republicans. Tennessee has an open primary system.

=== Tenure ===
While Davis filed two bills within the U.S. House of Representatives as the original sponsor (one Davis bill was to create a federal "American Eagle Day"), he signed on as cosponsor to other pending legislation including H.R.621, a House resolution that sought to "...amend part B of title XVIII of the Social Security Act to restore the Medicare treatment of ownership of oxygen equipment to that in effect before enactment of the Deficit Reduction Act of 2005."

In 2007, Davis also cosponsored H.R.1398 to amend the Comprehensive Environmental Response, Compensation, and Liability Act of 1980 by providing that manure shall not be considered to be a hazardous substance, pollutant, or contaminant. H.R. 1398 was referred to the Subcommittee on Water Resources and Environment where it died.

During November 2007, Davis was quoted by the Mountain Press of Sevierville, Tennessee as favoring amnesty for illegal immigrants within the United States with his reported statement that "Most people in East Tennessee will welcome people with open arms if they come here legally," Davis said. "Illegal is illegal, though. I don't think the answer is deporting 12 million people, though."

In 2008, Davis was ranked very near the bottom (430th out of 435) of Knowlegis' power rankings for members of the House of Representatives, as reported by Congress.org.

=== Political positions ===
Davis was one of the most conservative members of the Tennessee House, and was no less conservative in Congress. He is particularly known for his strongly conservative stands on social issues.

In 2007, he garnered a perfect 100% score on the American Conservative Union’s 2007 Ratings of Congress.

== See also ==
- USA Congressional staff edits to Wikipedia

U.S. House of Representatives
Preceded by Bill Jenkins	Member of the U.S. House of Representatives from Tennessee's 1st congressional district 2007–2009	Succeeded by Phil Roe
U.S. order of precedence (ceremonial)
Preceded by Mike Ward as Former U.S. Representative	Order of precedence of the United States as Former U.S. Representative	Succeeded by Charlie Luken as Former U.S. Representative
