= Tennessee House of Representatives 1st district =

State legislative district in Tennessee

Tennessee's 1st State House of Representatives district
- Map of Tennessee House districts, with the 1st District shaded in red
Representative
John Crawford; R–Kingsport
- Demographics: 91% White; 2% Black; 2% Hispanic; 1% Asian; 1% Other
- Population (2024): 67,414

The Tennessee House of Representatives 1st district is one of 99 legislative districts included in the lower house of the Tennessee General Assembly. The district is located in Sullivan County, covering parts of the cities of Kingsport and Bristol. The district has been represented by John Crawford, since 2017.

== Demographics ==
According to the 2024 American Community Survey, District 60 had a population of approximately 67,414.

- 91% of the district is White
- 2.4% of the district is African American
- 2.6% of the district is Hispanic
- 0.6% of the district is Asian
- 0.3% of the district is Other
- 3.1% of district is another race or 2 or more races.

Detailed demographic information on the district is also available through Statistical Atlas.

== List of representatives ==
Representatives	Party	Years of Service	General Assembly	Residence
John M. Fleming	Democratic	1977-1979	88th	Bristol
Clarence Blackburn Jr.	Democratic	1979-1983	89th-91st	Blountville
Craft Akard	Democratic	1981-1983	92nd	Bristol
Dana E. Moore	Democratic	1983-1987	93rd-94th	Bristol
Jim Holcomb	Republican	1987-1993	95th-97th	Bluff City
Ron Ramsey	Republican	1993-1997	98th-99th	Blountville
Steve Godsey	Republican	1997-2005	100th-103rd	Blountville
Vacant
Jon Lundberg	Republican	2007-2017	105th-109th	Bristol
John Crawford	Republican	2017–present	110th-114th	Kingsport
