= Bart Gordon =

American politician (born 1949)

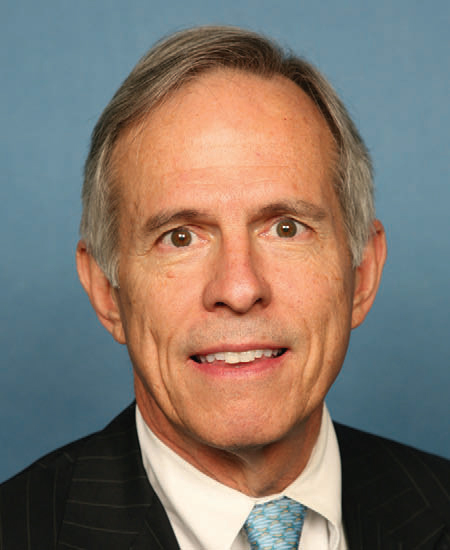

Chair of the House Science Committee
- In office January 4, 2007 – January 3, 2011
- Preceded by: Sherwood Boehlert
- Succeeded by: Ralph Hall

Ranking Member of the House Science Committee
- In office January 3, 2003 – January 4, 2007
- Preceded by: Ralph Hall
- Succeeded by: Ralph Hall

Member of the U.S. House of Representatives from Tennessee's 6th district
- In office January 3, 1985 – January 3, 2011
- Preceded by: Al Gore
- Succeeded by: Diane Black

Personal details
- Born: Barton Jennings Gordon; January 24, 1949 (age 77) Murfreesboro, Tennessee, U.S.
- Party: Democratic
- Spouse: Leslie
- Education: Middle Tennessee State University (BS); University of Tennessee, Knoxville (JD)

Military service
- Allegiance: United States
- Branch/service: United States Army
- Years of service: 1971–1972
- Gordon's voice Gordon supporting the Radioactive Import Deterrence Act. Recorded December 2, 2009

Barton Jennings Gordon (born January 24, 1949) is an American politician and former U.S. representative for Tennessee's 6th congressional district, serving from 1985 until 2011. The district includes several rural areas and fast-growing suburbs east of Nashville. He was Chairman of the House Committee on Science and Technology from 2007 until 2011. He is a member of the Democratic Party. He announced on December 14, 2009, that he would not seek re-election in 2010.

== Early life, education, and early political career ==
Gordon was born in Murfreesboro, Tennessee, where he has lived all of his life. His father and grandfathers were farmers, and his mother was a teacher in the Rutherford County schools. He served in the United States Army Reserve in 1971 and 1972. He graduated cum laude from Middle Tennessee State University in 1971, where he was student body president, and earned a J.D. degree from the University of Tennessee College of Law in 1973. He is a member of the Kappa Alpha Order. He then entered private practice in Murfreesboro.

Active in Democratic politics early on, he was briefly executive director of the Tennessee Democratic Party in 1979 and state party chairman from 1981 to 1983.

== U.S. House of Representatives ==
=== Elections ===
When 6th District Congressman Al Gore announced in 1983 that he would run for the United States Senate in 1984, Gordon stepped down as state party chairman to run for the seat. He initially faced a hard-fought race against the brother of the publisher of Nashville's former conservative newspaper, the Nashville Banner. However, he won handily in November 1984, riding Gore's coattails in the midst of Ronald Reagan's landslide victory in that year's presidential election. Gordon is regarded as a moderate. He has favored the repeal of the inheritance tax and the "marriage tax penalty".

Gordon was re-elected by huge margins until 1994, when his Republican opponent was attorney Steve Gill, a former basketball player at the University of Tennessee who is now a radio talk show host. Gordon only won by one percentage point, but managed to defeat Gill more handily in 1996. Gordon was re-elected in 1998 and 2000 by margins similar to those he scored in the 1980s and early 1990s. He faced no significant opposition in 2002, 2004 and 2006 and was unopposed in 2008. This is largely because the 2002 reapportionment by the Democratic-controlled Tennessee General Assembly removed Williamson County, a wealthy and heavily Republican suburban area south of Nashville, from the 6th District and added it to the already heavily Republican 7th District. From 2003 to 2019, that district was held by Marsha Blackburn, a Williamson County resident who was Gordon's opponent in 1992–the first time since his initial run for the seat that he faced a reasonably well-financed Republican challenger.

Even as Gordon continued to win reelection, the 6th began trending heavily Republican at the local level in the 1990s and 2000s. For instance, even with Gore atop the ticket as Bill Clinton's running mate in 1996 and as presidential candidate in 2000, the Republican nominee for president carried the district in both elections. In addition to Nashville's suburbs bleeding into the district, the more rural areas began shedding their "Yellow Dog Democratic" roots. The Republican trend in the district really manifested itself after Gordon's retirement; his replacement as Democratic candidate, Brett Carter, only tallied 29.3 percent of the vote, barely half that of Republican State Senator Diane Black. No Democrat crossed the 30 percent mark in the district since Gordon's retirement until the 2022 reappointment by the Republican-controlled General Assembly, which added parts of Davidson County in the district.

=== Tenure ===
During his tenure in Congress, Gordon "helped pass the COMPETES Act and the 2007 Energy Bill."

In December 2008, Gordon came under fire from Tennessee conservatives for failing to vote on the auto bailout, stating that his failure to vote was due to a "technical glitch" in the voting system. In March 2010, Gordon announced that he would vote in favor of the Senate Health Care bill.

Gordon has been the fastest runner of foot races in Congress for 20 years. Most recently, he defeated Congressman Aaron Schock, 33 years his younger at the Capital Challenge Charity Race.

Gordon voted against the Affordable Health Care for America Act in November 2009 but voted for both the Patient Protection and Affordable Care Act and the Health Care and Education Reconciliation Act of 2010 in March 2010.

In April 2009, Gordon voted against the Matthew Shepard and James Byrd, Jr. Hate Crimes Prevention Act.

=== Committee assignments ===
- Committee on Energy and Commerce (1995–2011)
- Committee on Science and Technology (1985–1987; 1997–2011) (Ranking Member, 2003–2007; Chairman, 2007–2011)
- Committee on the Budget (1993–1995)
- Committee on Rules (1987–1995)
- Committee on Banking, Finance, and Urban Affairs (1985–1987)
- Permanent Select Committee on Aging (1985–1987)
  - Source: Rep. Gordon's Previous Committee Assignments
  - Source: Rep. Gordon's Committees and Subcommittees

== Post-congressional career ==
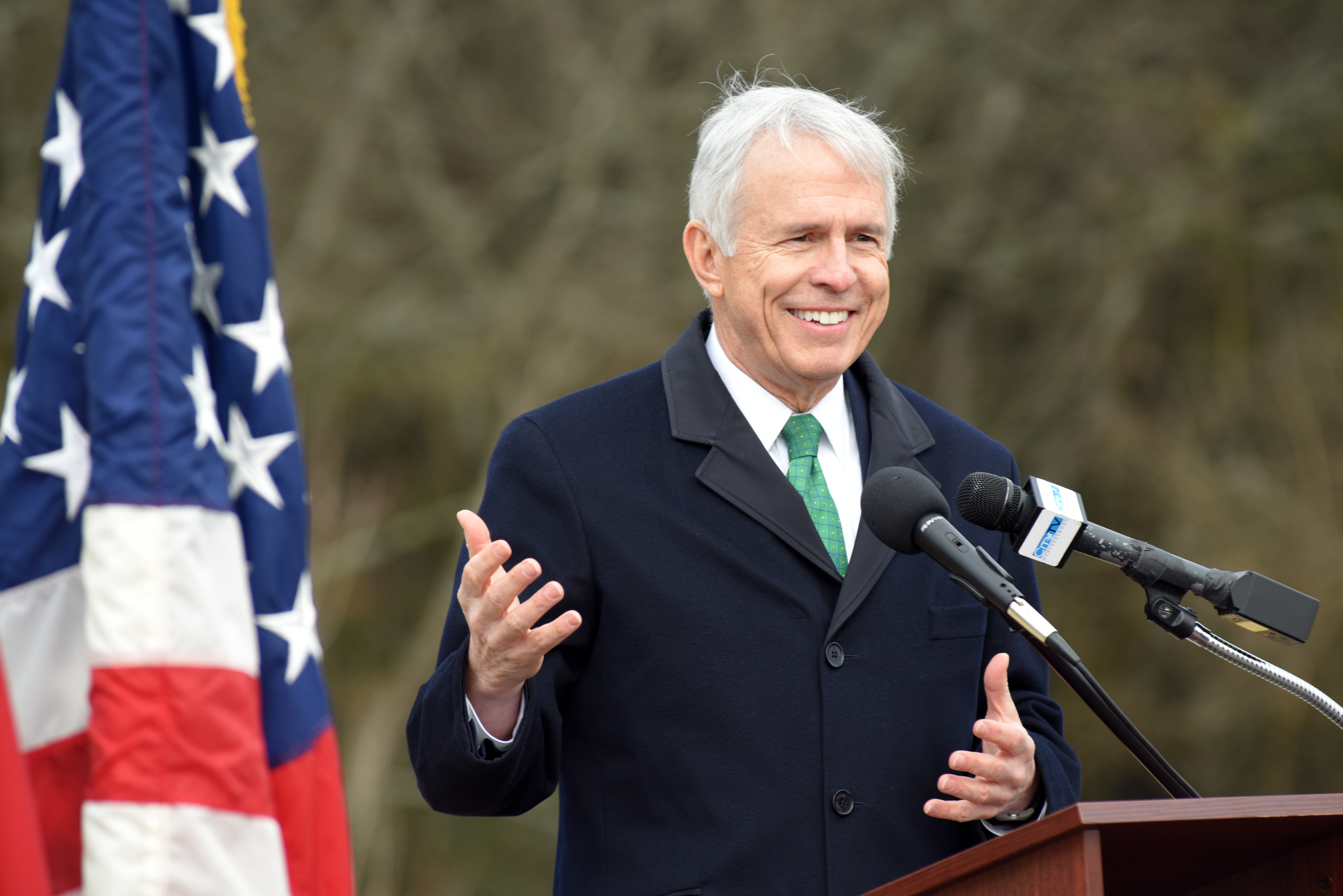
Gordon speaking in 2016

Gordon is currently a partner in the global law firm K&L Gates and is a distinguished fellow at the Council on Competitiveness. He was appointed by President Obama to the U.S. Antarctic Program Blue Ribbon Panel, the panel traveled to the Antarctic in December 2011 and put out the report “More and Better Science in Antarctica Through Increased Logistical Effectiveness” in July 2012. He is a member of the Brookings Leadership Advisory Board and is a project member for the American Academy of Arts and Sciences' New Models for U.S. Science and Technology Policy. He is a board member of the U.S Association of Former Members of Congress, and the Middle Tennessee State University Foundation and he is on the Board of Counselors for the Center for the Study of the Presidency and Congress. He also is a member of the ReFormers Caucus of Issue One.

In 2012 Gordon was bestowed the insignia of Officer in the French Legion of Honor. He delivered the commencement keynote address and was awarded an honorary doctorate from Rensselaer Polytechnic Institute in May 2012. In May 2013, he received the first honorary doctorate given by his alma mater Middle Tennessee State University.

U.S. House of Representatives
Preceded by Al Gore	Member of the U.S. House of Representatives from Tennessee's 6th congressional district 1985–2011	Succeeded by Diane Black
Preceded by Ralph Hall	Ranking Member of the House Science Committee; 2003–2007	Succeeded by Ralph Hall
Preceded by Sherwood Boehlert	Chair of the House Science Committee; 2007–2011	Succeeded by Ralph Hall
U.S. order of precedence (ceremonial)
Preceded by Bob Goodlatte as Former U.S. Representative	Order of precedence of the United States as Former U.S. Representative	Succeeded by Steve Chabot as Former U.S. Representative
