= Bill Jenkins (politician) =

American politician (born 1936)

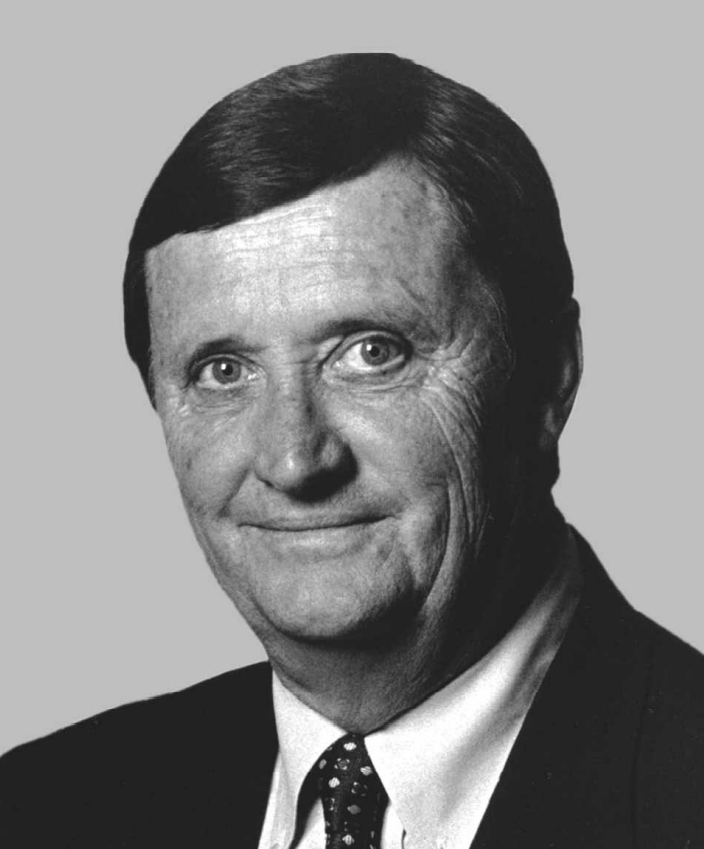
- Official portrait, 1997

Member of the U.S. House of Representatives from Tennessee's 1st district
- In office January 3, 1997 – January 3, 2007
- Preceded by: Jimmy Quillen
- Succeeded by: David Davis

Speaker of the Tennessee House of Representatives
- In office January 1969 – May 1970
- Preceded by: James H. Cummings
- Succeeded by: James McKinney

Member of the Tennessee House of Representatives
- In office January 1963 – May 1970
- Preceded by: Hugh Moles
- Succeeded by: Bruce Hurley

Personal details
- Born: William Lewis Jenkins; November 29, 1936 (age 89) Detroit, Michigan, U.S.
- Party: Republican
- Spouse: Kathryn Jenkins
- Education: Tennessee Technological University (BBA); University of Tennessee (JD)

William Lewis Jenkins (born November 29, 1936) is an American politician from the state of Tennessee. He represented the state's 1st congressional district, centered on the Tri-Cities (map), from 1997 until his successor was sworn in on January 3, 2007.

== Background and education ==
Jenkins was born in Detroit, Michigan, to parents from Rogersville, Tennessee. He is a seventh-generation Tennessean. He served in the United States Army from 1959 to 1960, and graduated from Tennessee Tech and the University of Tennessee College of Law.

== Political career ==
Jenkins was elected to the Tennessee General Assembly as a Republican in 1962 and he served as Speaker of the House from 1969 to 1971—the first Republican to hold that position since a few years after Reconstruction, and the last one until Kent Williams in 2009. He unsuccessfully sought the Republican nomination for Governor of Tennessee in 1970, was a Commissioner of the Tennessee Department of Conservation, serving in the Cabinet of Winfield Dunn, and according to his website biography, he was a senior policy advisor on energy and legislative issues for Governor Lamar Alexander.

Jenkins was the only Republican to serve as Speaker of the Tennessee House in the 20th century. He was also one of the youngest persons to ever hold the office.

Jenkins served on the board of directors of the Tennessee Valley Authority from 1971 to 1978, and he was a circuit court judge for Tennessee's Third Judicial District from 1990 to 1996.

== Running for Congress ==
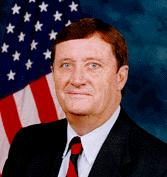
Jenkins' official congressional portrait

On May 10, 1996, he resigned his judgeship to run for the House of Representatives from the First Congressional District after 17-term incumbent Jimmy Quillen announced his retirement.

The 12-way primary election was watched very closely in Tennessee Republican circles, as the district is so heavily Republican that whoever won the primary was all but assured of being the district's next congressman. The First District has been in Republican hands for all but four years since 1859.

Although Jenkins did not secure Quillen's endorsement for the primary, he narrowly won with 18% of the vote and breezed to election in November.

== Reelection and legislation ==
He was reelected four times without serious opposition, and ran unopposed in 2000 and 2002. He won a fifth term in 2004 with 74% of the vote.

Jenkins kept a relatively low profile in Congress in contrast to Quillen and B. Carroll Reece, who between them represented the 1st District for all but seven of the 76 years before Jenkins won the seat. His voting record was reliably conservative.

== Best bass fisherman in Congress ==
As seen on ESPN: "After the final cast was made, however, bragging rights for the title of "best bass fishermen in Congress" went to U.S. Representative Bill Jenkins (R-TN), who teamed up with BASS Elite Series pro Dave Wolak and Toyota's Charlie Ing to finish with five bass weighing 18 pounds, 9 ounces.

Fittingly, the 70-year-old legislator from Tennessee also posted the largest fish of the event, a 4 ½-pound largemouth that he caught in Mattawoman Creek, a tributary of the Potomac River in Maryland."

== Retirement ==
On February 15, 2006, Jenkins announced that he would not run for a sixth term. He said that he wanted to spend more time with his family since he turned 70 that November.

== See also ==
- List of members of the 108th United States Congress
- Rogersville, Tennessee

== Electoral history ==
Tennessee's 1st congressional district: Results 1996–2004
Year	Democrat	Votes	Pct	Republican	Votes	Pct		Independent	Votes	Pct	Independent	Votes	Pct	
1996	Kay C. Smith	58,657	32%	William L. Jenkins	117,676	65%		Dave Davis	1,947	1%	James B. Taylor	1,089	1%	*
1998	Kay C. White	30,710	31%	William L. Jenkins	68,904	69%	*							
2000	(no candidate)			William L. Jenkins	157,828	100%	*							
2002	(no candidate)			William L. Jenkins	127,300	99%		Write-ins	1,586	1%				
2004	Graham Leonard	56,361	24%	William L. Jenkins	172,543	74%		Ralph J. Ball	3,061	1%	Michael Peavler	1,595	1%	

Write-in and minor candidate notes: In 1996, Bill Bull Durham received 885 votes; John Curtis received 621 votes; Mike Fugate received 440 votes; Paul Schmidt received 367 votes; and write-ins received 26 votes. In 1998, write-ins received 75 votes. In 2000, write-ins received 20 votes.

Political offices
Preceded by James H. Cummings	Speaker of the Tennessee House of Representatives; 1969–1970	Succeeded by James McKinney
U.S. House of Representatives
Preceded by Jimmy Quillen	Member of the U.S. House of Representatives from Tennessee's 1st congressional district 1997–2007	Succeeded by David Davis
U.S. order of precedence (ceremonial)
Preceded by Harold Ford Jr. as Former U.S. Representative	Order of precedence of the United States as Former U.S. Representative	Succeeded by Ed Feighan as Former U.S. Representative
