= 2012 United States House of Representatives elections in Tennessee =

- November 6, 2012

All 9 Tennessee seats to the United States House of Representatives
- Turnout: 61.86% ▲20.54 pp
	Majority party	Minority party
Party	Republican	Democratic
Last election	7	2
Seats won	7	2
Seat change	Steady	Steady
Popular vote	1,369,562	796,513
Percentage	59.97%	34.88%
Swing	▼1.29%	▲0.15%

Republican
40–50%
50–60%
60–70%
70–80%
80–90%
Democratic
40–50%
50–60%
60–70%
70–80%

The 2012 United States House of Representatives elections in Tennessee was held on Tuesday, November 6, 2012, to elect the nine U.S. representatives from the state of Tennessee, one from each of the state's nine congressional districts. The elections coincided with the elections of other federal and state offices, including a quadrennial presidential election and an election to the U.S. Senate. Primary elections were held on August 2, 2012.

These elections were the first under Tennessee's new congressional map after redistricting was completed by the state government. Following the 2012 elections, no seats changed hands, leaving the Tennessee delegation at a 7-2 Republican majority.

== Redistricting ==
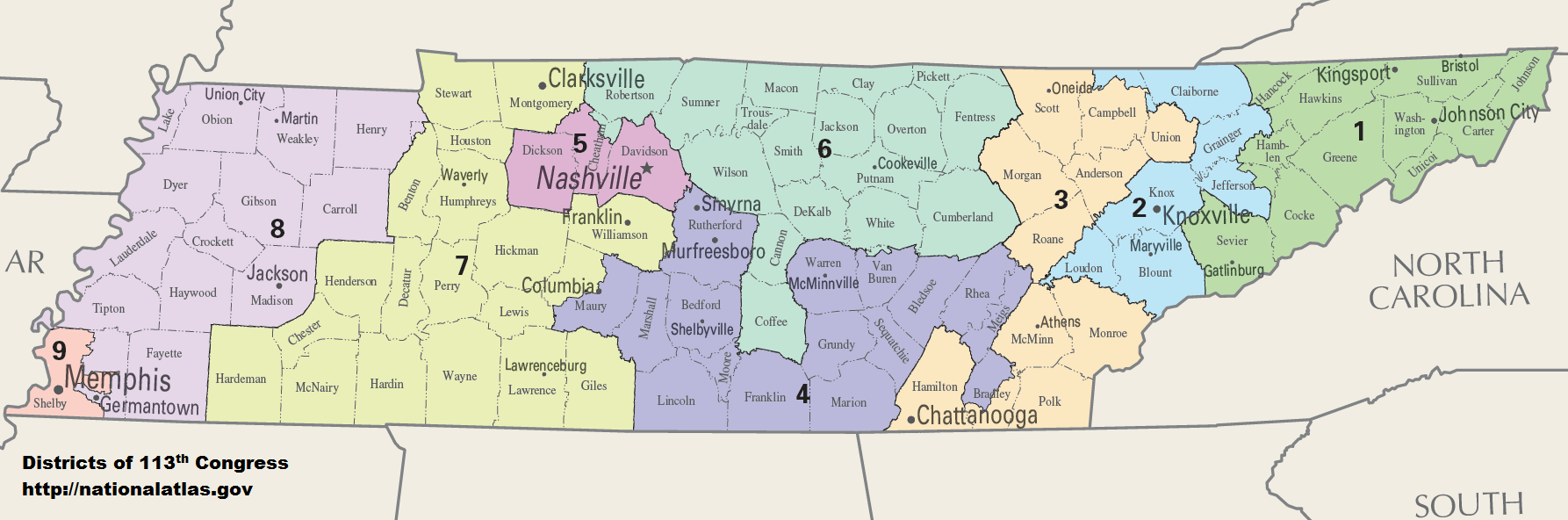
Tennessee's congressional districts, 2013-2023

Following the 2010 United States census, the Tennessee General Assembly, now controlled by the Republican Party for the first time since Reconstruction, and Republican Governor Bill Haslam enacted new congressional district boundaries in early 2012. The legislature passed the congressional redistricting plan on January 13, 2012, and it was signed into law on January 26, 2012.

Under the 2012 plan, Republicans solidified their electoral advantage by shaping districts to concentrate Democratic voters into just two districts, effectively preserving a 7–2 Republican majority in the U.S. House delegation. Observers noted that the new map cemented GOP dominance and made several Republican seats safer by altering district boundaries to favor Republican performance.

== Overview ==
United States House of Representatives elections in Tennessee, 2012
Party	Votes	Percentage	Seats Before	Seats After	+/–
Republican	1,369,562	59.97%	7	7	Steady
Democratic	796,513	34.88%	2	2	Steady
Independent/Green	117,098	5.13%	0	0	0
Write-in	554	0.02%	0	0	0
Totals	2,283,727	100.00%	9	9	—

Popular vote
Republican	59.97%
Democratic	34.88%
Other	5.15%

House seats
Republican	77.78%
Democratic	22.22%

=== By district ===
District	Incumbent	Party	First elected	Result	Candidates
Tennessee 1	Phil Roe	Republican	2008	Incumbent re-elected.	✓ Phil Roe (Republican) 76.1%; Alan Woodruff (Democratic) 19.9%; Karen Brackett (Independent) 2.0%
Tennessee 2	Jimmy Duncan	Republican	1988 (Special)	Incumbent re-elected.	✓ Jimmy Duncan (Republican) 74.5%; Troy Goodale (Democratic) 20.5%; Greg Samples (Independent) 1.7%; Paul Coker (Independent); Brandon Stewart (Independent)
Tennessee 3	Chuck Fleischmann	Republican	2010	Incumbent re-elected.	✓ Chuck Fleischmann (Republican) 61.5%; Mary Headrick (Democratic) 35.5%; Matthew Deniston (Independent) 3.1%
Tennessee 4	Scott DesJarlais	Republican	2010	Incumbent re-elected.	✓ Scott DesJarlais (Republican) 55.8%; Eric Stewart (Democratic) 44.2%
Tennessee 5	Jim Cooper	Democratic	1982; 1994 (retired); 2002	Incumbent re-elected.	✓ Jim Cooper (Democratic) 65.2%; Brad Staats (Republican) 32.8%; John Miglietta (Green) 2.0%
Tennessee 6	Diane Black	Republican	2010	Incumbent re-elected.	✓ Diane Black (Republican) 76.6%; Robert Beasley (Independent) 14.4%; Pat Riley (Green) 9.0%
Tennessee 7	Marsha Blackburn	Republican	2002	Incumbent re-elected.	✓ Marsha Blackburn (Republican) 71.0%; Credo Amouzouvik (Democratic) 24.0%; Howard Switzer (Green) 1.8%; Jack Arnold (Independent) 1.7%; William Akin (Independent) 1.1%; Lenny Ladner (Independent) 0.5%
Tennessee 8	Stephen Fincher	Republican	2010	Incumbent re-elected.	✓ Stephen Fincher (Republican) 68.3%; Timothy Dixon (Democratic) 28.4%; James Hart (Independent) 2.2%; Mark Rawles (Independent) 1.0%
Tennessee 9	Steve Cohen	Democratic	2006	Incumbent re-elected.	✓ Steve Cohen (Democratic) 75.1%; George Flinn (Republican) 23.8%; Brian Saulsberry (Independent) 0.6%; Gregory Joiner (Independent) 0.5%

== District 1 ==
2012 Tennessee's 1st congressional district election
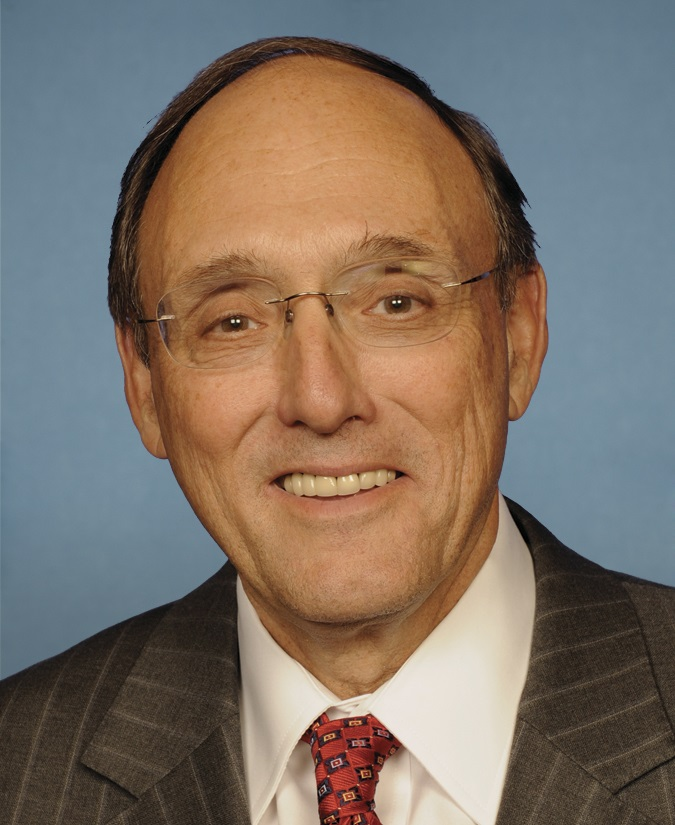

Nominee	Phil Roe	Alan Woodruff
Party	Republican	Democratic
Popular vote	182,252	47,663
Percentage	76.0%	19.9%
- County results Roe: 70–80% 80–90%
U.S. Representative before election
Phil Roe
Republican
Elected U.S. Representative
Phil Roe
Republican

The redrawn 1st district will represent Carter, Cocke, Greene, Hamblen, Hancock, Hawkins, Johnson, Sevier, Sullivan, Unicoi, and Washington counties, and parts of Jefferson County. The most populous city in the district is Johnson City, and the district will continue to be anchored by the Tri-Cities area. Republican Phil Roe, who had represented the 1st district since 2009, ran for re-election.

=== Republican primary ===
==== Candidates ====
===== Nominee =====
- Phil Roe, incumbent U.S. Representative

==== Primary results ====
Republican primary results
Party	Candidate	Votes	%
Republican	Phil Roe (incumbent)	53,490	100.0
Total votes		53,490	100.0

=== Democratic primary ===
==== Candidates ====
===== Nominee =====
- Alan Woodruff, attorney

==== Primary results ====
Democratic primary results
Party	Candidate	Votes	%
Democratic	Alan Woodruff	5,687	100.0
Total votes		5,687	100.0

=== General election ===
==== Endorsements ====
Phil Roe (R)

Labor unions

- National Association of Letter Carriers

==== Predictions ====
Source	Ranking	As of
The Cook Political Report	Safe R	November 5, 2012
Rothenberg	Safe R	November 2, 2012
Roll Call	Safe R	November 4, 2012
Sabato's Crystal Ball	Safe R	November 5, 2012
NY Times	Safe R	November 4, 2012
RCP	Safe R	November 4, 2012
The Hill	Safe R	November 4, 2012

==== Results ====
Tennessee's 1st congressional district, 2012
Party	Candidate	Votes	%
Republican	Phil Roe (Incumbent)	182,252	76.0
Democratic	Alan Woodruff	47,663	19.9
Independent	Karen Brackett	4,837	2.0
Green	Robert N. Smith	2,872	1.2
Independent	Michael Salyer	2,048	0.9
Total votes		239,672	100.0
Republican hold			

== District 2 ==
2012 Tennessee's 2nd congressional district election
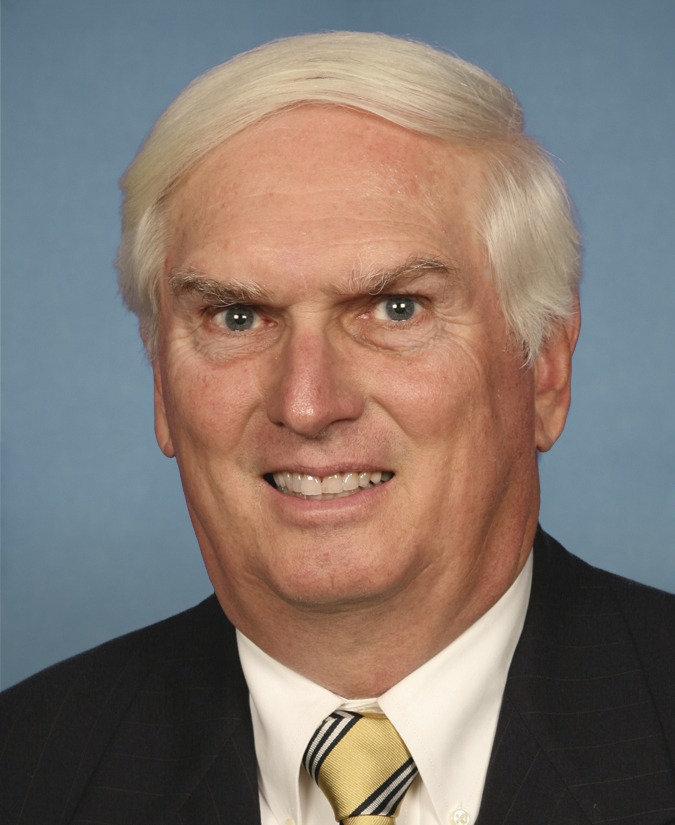

Nominee	Jimmy Duncan	Troy Goodale
Party	Republican	Democratic
Popular vote	196,894	54,522
Percentage	74.4%	20.6%
- County results Duncan: 60–70% 70–80% 80–90%
U.S. Representative before election
John J. Duncan, Jr.
Republican
Elected U.S. Representative
John J. Duncan, Jr.
Republican

The redrawn 2nd district will represent Blount, Claiborne, Grainger, Knox, and Loudon counties, and parts of Campbell and Jefferson counties. The most populous city in the district is Knoxville; as before, the district is largely coextensive with that city's metropolitan area. Republican Jimmy Duncan who had represented the 2nd district since 1988 ran for re-election.

=== Republican primary ===
==== Candidates ====
===== Nominee =====
- Jimmy Duncan, incumbent U.S. Representative

===== Eliminated in primary =====
- Nick Ciparro, musician and full-time student
- Joseph Leinweber Jr., U.S. Air Force

==== Primary results ====
Republican primary results
Party	Candidate	Votes	%
Republican	John J. Duncan, Jr. (incumbent)	36,335	83.4
Republican	Joseph Leinweber, Jr.	3,919	9.0
Republican	Nick Ciparro	3,317	7.6
Total votes		43,571	100.0

=== Democratic primary ===
==== Candidates ====
===== Nominee =====
- Troy Goodale, professor of Political Science at Tusculum College

==== Primary results ====
Democratic primary results
Party	Candidate	Votes	%
Democratic	Troy Goodale	5,617	100.0
Total votes		5,617	100.0

=== General election ===
==== Predictions ====
Source	Ranking	As of
The Cook Political Report	Safe R	November 5, 2012
Rothenberg	Safe R	November 2, 2012
Roll Call	Safe R	November 4, 2012
Sabato's Crystal Ball	Safe R	November 5, 2012
NY Times	Safe R	November 4, 2012
RCP	Safe R	November 4, 2012
The Hill	Safe R	November 4, 2012

==== Results ====
Tennessee's 2nd congressional district, 2012
Party	Candidate	Votes	%
Republican	Jimmy Duncan (Incumbent)	196,894	74.4
Democratic	Troy Goodale	54,522	20.6
Green	Norris Dryer	5,733	2.2
Independent	Greg Samples	4,382	1.7
Independent	Brandon Stewart	2,974	1.1
Total votes		264,505	100
Republican hold			

== District 3 ==
2012 Tennessee's 3rd congressional district election
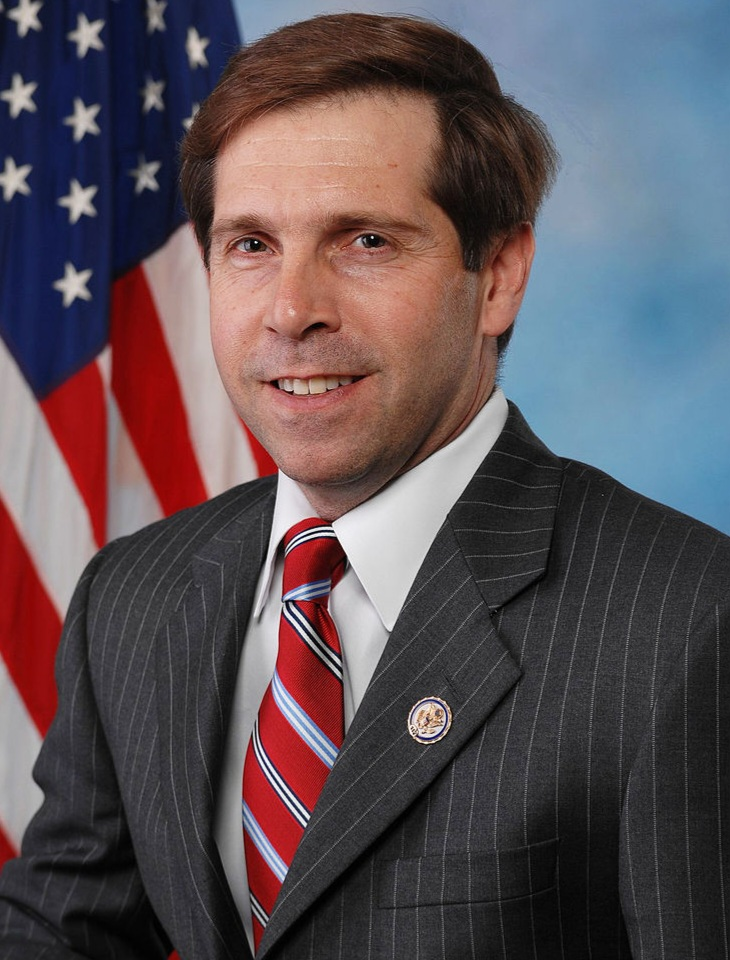

Nominee	Chuck Fleischmann	Mary Headrick
Party	Republican	Democratic
Popular vote	157,830	91,094
Percentage	61.5%	35.4%
- County results Fleischmann: 50–60% 60–70% 70–80%
U.S. Representative before election
Chuck Fleischmann
Republican
Elected U.S. Representative
Chuck Fleischmann
Republican

The redrawn 3rd district will represent Anderson, Hamilton, McMinn, Monroe, Morgan, Polk, Roane, Scott, and Union counties, and parts of Bradley and Campbell counties. The most populous city in the district is Chattanooga. Republican Chuck Fleischmann, who had represented the 3rd district since January 2011, ran for re-election.

=== Republican primary ===
==== Candidates ====
===== Nominee =====
- Chuck Fleischmann, incumbent U.S. Representative

===== Eliminated in primary =====
- Ron Bhalla, businessman
- Scottie Mayfield, president of Mayfield Dairy
- Weston Wamp, founder of a public relations firm and son of former U.S. Representative Zach Wamp

===== Withdrawn =====
- Jean Howard-Hill, former professor at the University of Tennessee at Chattanooga and candidate for this seat in 2008 and 2010

===== Declined =====
- J.B. Bennett, attorney
- Savas Kyriakidis, businessman, Command Judge in the U.S. Army and independent candidate for this seat in 2010
- Robin Smith, health care consultant and former chair of the Tennessee Republican Party and candidate for this seat in 2010
- Tres Wittum, a policy and research analyst for state senator Bo Watson

==== Primary results ====
Republican primary results
Party	Candidate	Votes	%
Republican	Chuck Fleischmann (incumbent)	29,947	39.1
Republican	Scottie Mayfield	23,779	31.0
Republican	Weston Wamp	21,997	28.7
Republican	Ron Bhalla	926	1.2
Total votes		76,649	100.0

=== Democratic primary ===
==== Candidates ====
===== Nominee =====
- Mary Headrick, emergency room and acute care physician

===== Eliminated in primary =====
- Bill Taylor, businessman,

===== Declined =====
- Brenda Freeman Short, candidate for this seat in 2010

==== Primary results ====
Democratic primary results
Party	Candidate	Votes	%
Democratic	Mary Headrick	14,915	67.0
Democratic	Bill Taylor	7,343	33.0
Total votes		22,258	100.0

=== Independents ===
==== Candidates ====
- Matthew Deniston, Army Veteran and former Ranger

===== Withdrawn =====
- Topher Kersting, web designer

===== Declined =====
- Savas Kyriakidis, businessman, Command Judge in the U.S. Army and independent candidate for this seat in 2010

=== General election ===
==== Endorsements ====
Chuck Fleischmann (R)

Organizations

- American Conservative Union

==== Predictions ====
Source	Ranking	As of
The Cook Political Report	Safe R	November 5, 2012
Rothenberg	Safe R	November 2, 2012
Roll Call	Safe R	November 4, 2012
Sabato's Crystal Ball	Safe R	November 5, 2012
NY Times	Safe R	November 4, 2012
RCP	Safe R	November 4, 2012
The Hill	Safe R	November 4, 2012

==== Results ====
Tennessee's 3rd congressional district, 2012
Party	Candidate	Votes	%
Republican	Chuck Fleischmann (Incumbent)	157,830	61.5
Democratic	Mary Headrick	91,094	35.4
Independent	Matthew Deniston	7,905	3.1
Total votes		256,829	100
Republican hold			

== District 4 ==
2012 Tennessee's 4th congressional district election
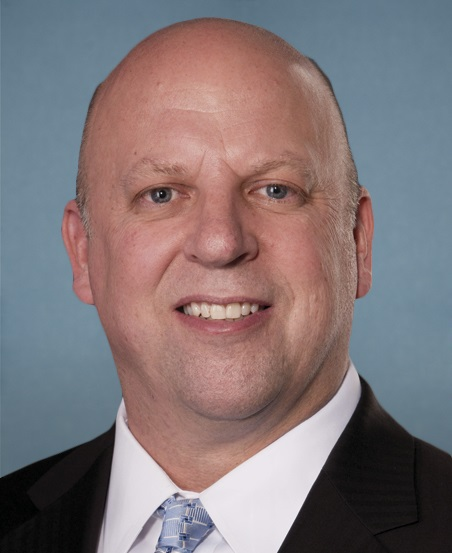

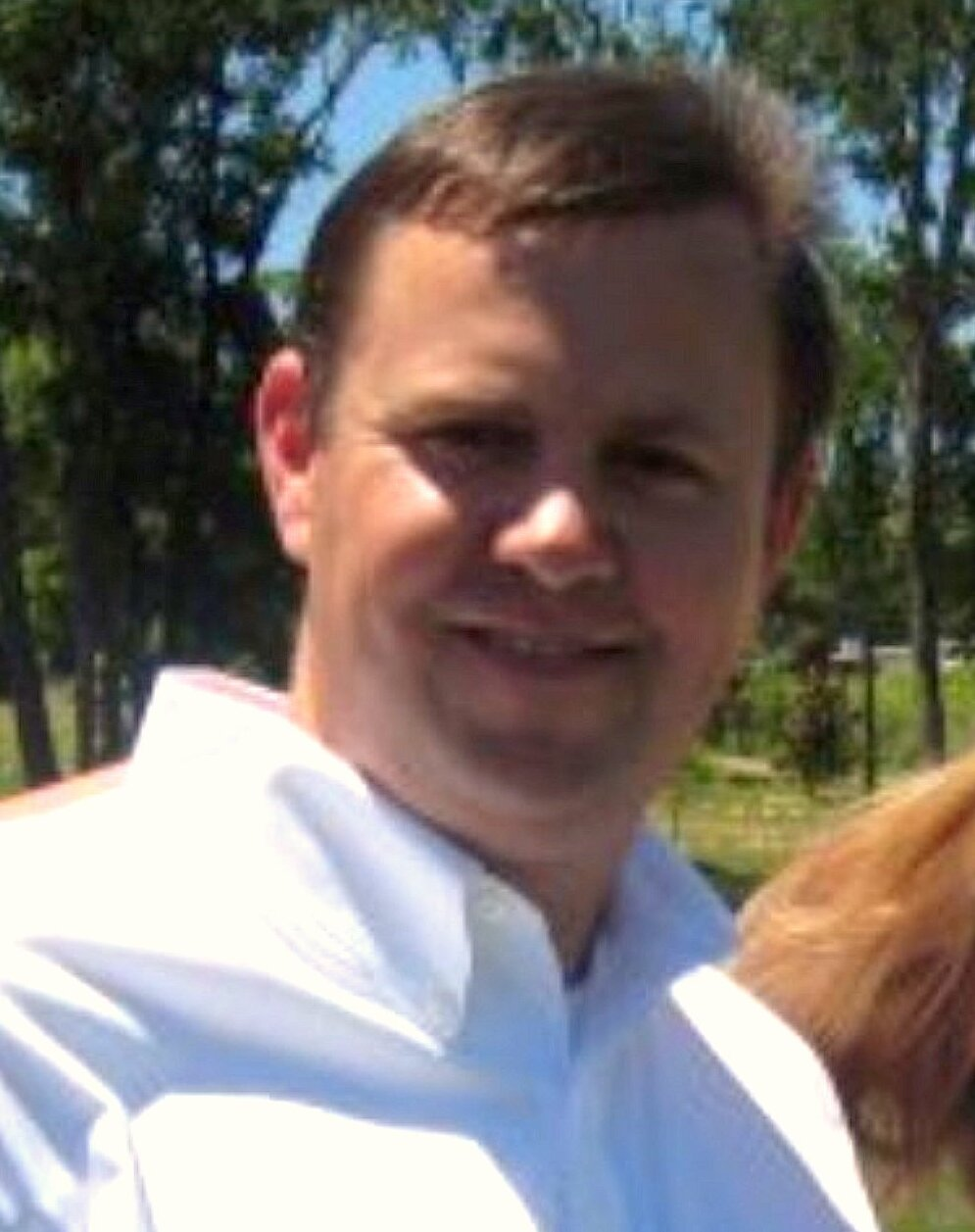
Nominee	Scott DesJarlais	Eric Stewart
Party	Republican	Democratic
Popular vote	128,568	102,022
Percentage	55.76%	44.24%
- County results DesJarlais: 50–60% 60–70% Stewart 50–60%
U.S. Representative before election
Scott DesJarlais
Republican
Elected U.S. Representative
Scott DesJarlais
Republican

The redrawn 4th district represented Bedford, Bledsoe, Franklin, Grundy, Lincoln, Marion, Marshall, Meigs, Moore, Rhea, Rutherford, Sequatchie, and Warren counties, and parts of Bradley, Maury, and Van Buren counties. The most populous city in the district was Murfreesboro, which had previously anchored the 6th District.

Republican Scott DesJarlais who had represented the 4th district since January 2011. He ran for re-election and won.

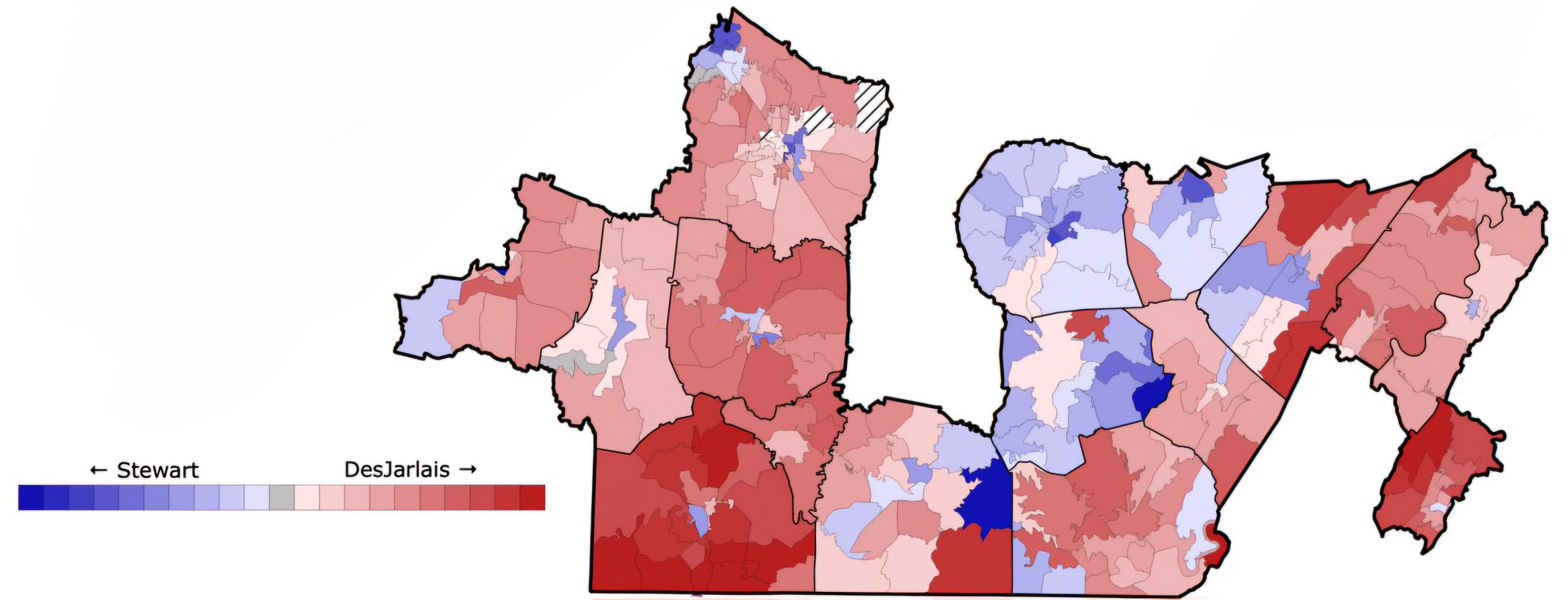
Results by precinct

=== Republican primary ===
State senator Bill Ketron, a Murfreesboro resident, had been rumored to be considering a run for the 4th; he was chairman of the redistricting committee and reportedly drew Murfreesboro into the district to facilitate a run. However, on January 22, 2012, he announced he would not run.

==== Candidates ====
===== Nominee =====
- Scott DesJarlais, incumbent U.S. Representative

===== Eliminated in primary =====
- Shannon Kelley, pilot

===== Declined =====
- Bill Ketron, state senator
- Jim Tracy, state senator

==== Primary results ====
DesJarlais won the Republican Party primary on August 2, 2012.

Republican primary results
Party	Candidate	Votes	%
Republican	Scott DesJarlais (Incumbent)	36,088	76.76%
Republican	Shannon Kelley	10,927	23.24%
Total votes		47,015	100.00%

=== Democratic primary ===
State senator Eric Stewart announced that he would seek the Democratic nomination to challenge DesJarlais in late 2011. The Democratic Congressional Campaign Committee made his candidacy their top priority in the South in early 2012. Stewart won the Democratic party endorsement.

==== Candidates ====
===== Nominee =====
- Eric Stewart, state senator

==== Primary results ====
Democratic primary results
Party	Candidate	Votes	%
Democratic	Eric Stewart	17,378	100.00%
Total votes		17,378	100.00%

=== General election ===
==== Campaign ====
The general election was characterized by a series of controversies involving the incumbent. Stewart agreed to three debates, but DesJarlais told the media that he would not participate. The incumbent was "open to revisiting the question later in the campaign", accusing Stewart of "lack of clarity on the issues" as a reason to avoid debating him. Stewart responded that DesJarlais was avoiding the voters. The local media were critical of the congressman's stance on the debate issue: the Chattanoogan asked, "Why Won't Desjarlais Debate?" and the Times Free Press called it "No good reason to avoid debates".

In October 2012, DesJarlais silenced two Democratic representatives on the floor of Congress. DesJarlais was Speaker of the House pro tempore, in a pro forma session to prevent "President Barack Obama from making recess appointments without congressional consent". Stewart accused DesJarlais of neglecting the district's farmers by not passing the Farm Bill.

The media reported in mid-October 2012 on DesJarlais divorce of his first wife, Susan, from 2001. During their divorce proceedings, Susan DesJarlais alleged that her ex-husband engaged in "violent and threatening behavior". Court filings revealed that he had an affair with a female patient, and pressured her to have an abortion after she became pregnant. In response to the news, Stewart called him a "pro-life hypocrite", contending that "DesJarlais can't be trusted". The DesJarlais campaign did not challenge the truth of the allegations, but replied that "This is old news...." Stewart parried in a news conference that:

Congressman DesJarlais has ... continued to hold himself out to the public as someone who is pro-life and pro-family, and today doesn't deny that as a medical doctor he had an affair with a patient, got that patient pregnant and then begged and pleaded with her to terminate the pregnancy.

— Eric Stewart

After all that, DesJarlais "lashed out at Stewart", stating "there was no pregnancy, and no abortion", blaming his opponents and ex-wife for "dredging up details from his past".

After the primary elections, the race had been rated "Likely GOP" by RealClearPolitics. By July 13 FEC filings, DesJarlais had raised twice as much as Stewart, and had "$591,976 in the bank to Stewart's $152,712". Stewart's aim was to "blanket" the local airways with ads attacking his opponent's vote in favor of Paul Ryan's budget, while the incumbent would tie him to President Barack Obama, who is unpopular in the district. As of October 7, The Tennessean noted that comparing "money and recent history, DesJarlais has the advantage", due to incumbency, raising twice the funds as Stewart, and the GOP tilt of the district; however, "DesJarlais' edge is not as large as the ones held by his Republican peers in Tennessee, ... DesJarlais entered the election with low name recognition, and he cannot count on the wave of conservative voters that swept Republican candidates into Congress two years ago." Both candidates were running as "outsiders".

As of October 12, the Romney/Ryan campaign had removed DesJarlais's endorsement from their website as reported by the Associated Press. Local political analyst Pat Nolan said that, as of October 10, this probably would be in the news for only a few days, "but it may take longer than that for it to really sink in and for people to understand it". When it breaks and how much money they have to get their messages across are "key" for them. By October 14, it had become the "State's most contentious U.S. House battle [that] has everyone talking". As of October 13, analysts stated that Stewart still had an uphill battle finding enough voters to back him.

On the eve of the election, November 5, the Associated Press called for Tennessee's 11 electoral votes to go to "Romney with ease." It also predicted an easy re-election for Senator Bob Corker. However, it noted "Tougher times for GOP Rep. Scott DesJarlais after revelations he once discussed abortion with mistress."

==== Endorsements ====
Eric Stewart (D)

Statewide officials

- Phil Bredesen, former Governor of Tennessee

Labor unions

- International Brotherhood of Boilermakers

Organizations

- Democratic Congressional Campaign Committee "Red to Blue" Program

==== Polling ====
Poll source	Date(s) administered	Sample size	Margin of error	Scott DesJarlais (R)	Eric Stewart (D)	Undecided
Public Opinion Strategies (R-DesJarlais)	October 22–23, 2012	400	± 4.9%	49%	36%	15%
Myers Research/Strategic Services (D-Stewart)	October 14–15, 2012	400	± 4.9%	49%	44%	7%

==== Predictions ====
Source	Ranking	As of
The Cook Political Report	Tossup	November 5, 2012
Rothenberg	Tilts R	November 2, 2012
Roll Call	Lean R	November 4, 2012
Sabato's Crystal Ball	Likely R	November 5, 2012
NY Times	Safe R	November 4, 2012
RCP	Lean R	November 4, 2012
The Hill	Lean R	November 4, 2012

==== Results ====
DesJarlais won the election.

Tennessee's 4th congressional district, 2012
Party	Candidate	Votes	%
Republican	Scott DesJarlais (Incumbent)	128,568	55.76%
Democratic	Eric Stewart	102,022	44.24%
Total votes		230,590	100.00%
Republican hold			

==== Aftermath ====
DailyKos noted that the race was one of the "few outliers" in 2012: "No Democratic challenger did quite so well in quite so red a district." Using regression analysis, Stewart's 44.24% tally was the second best of all Democratic candidates, compared to the 30.92% predicted share he would have gotten, all things being equal.

=== External links ===
- Map of new District 4 on Govtrack.com

== District 5 ==
2012 Tennessee's 5th congressional district election
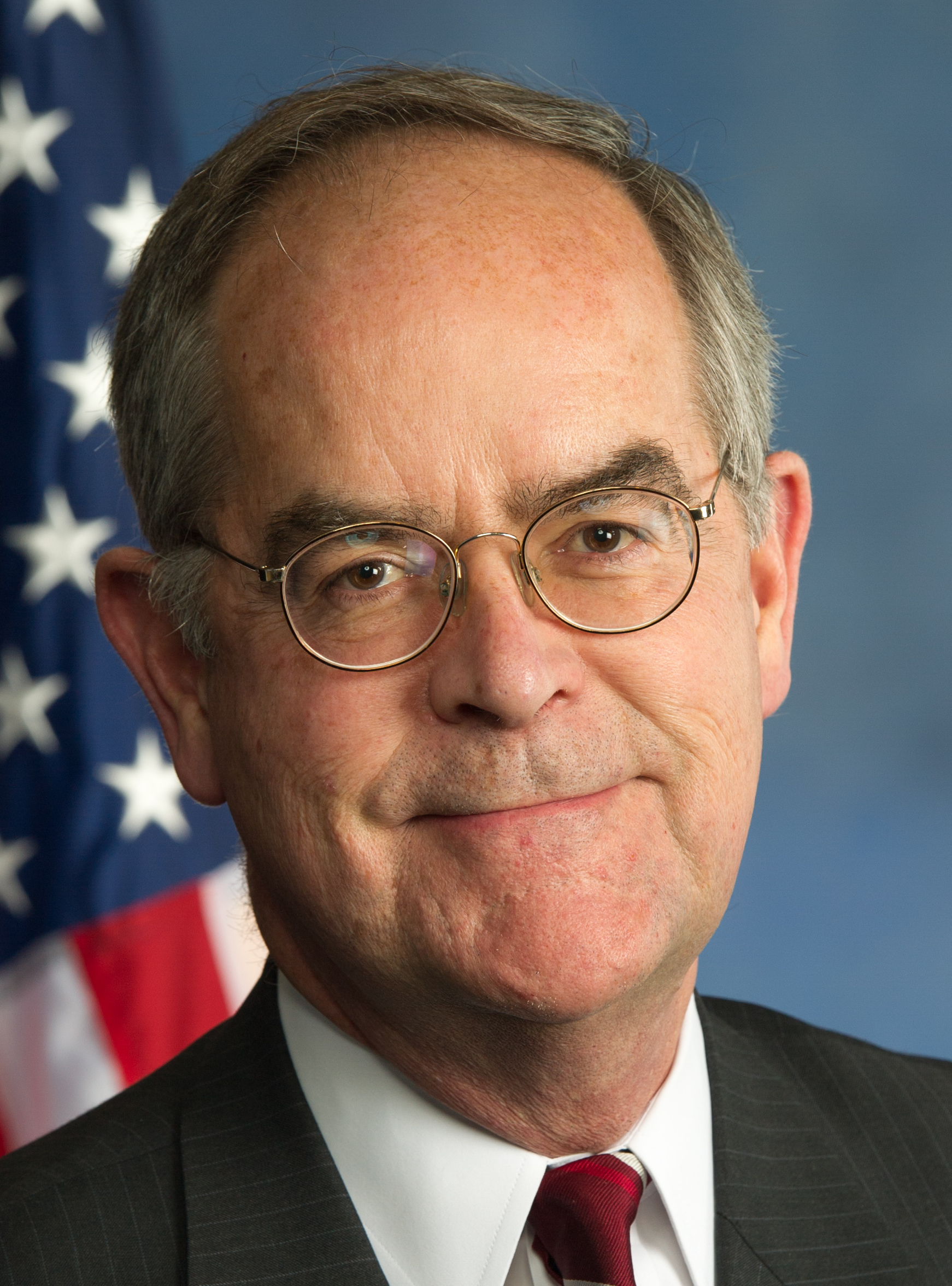

Nominee	Jim Cooper	Brad Staats
Party	Democratic	Republican
Popular vote	171,621	86,240
Percentage	65.2%	32.8%
- County results Cooper: 40–50% 60–70% Staats: 50–60%
U.S. Representative before election
Jim Cooper
Democratic
Elected U.S. Representative
Jim Cooper
Democratic

The redrawn 5th district will represent Davidson and Dickson counties, and most of Cheatham County. It is based around Nashville, all of which was restored to the district. Previously, a sliver of southwestern Nashville had been in the 7th District. Democrat Jim Cooper had represented the 5th district since 2003, and previously represented the 4th district from 1983 until 1995.

=== Democratic primary ===
==== Candidates ====
===== Nominee =====
- Jim Cooper, incumbent U.S. Representative

==== Primary results ====
Democratic primary results
Party	Candidate	Votes	%
Democratic	Jim Cooper (Incumbent)	28,110	100.0
Total votes		28,110	100.0

=== Republican primary ===
==== Candidates ====
===== Nominee =====
- Brad Staats, businessman and performing artist

===== Eliminated in primary =====
- Justin Jones
- Bob Ries, business owner
- John Smith, deputy sheriff
- Tracey Tarum, avionics technician

===== Declined =====
- Beth Harwell, speaker of the Tennessee House of Representatives

==== Primary results ====
Republican primary results
Party	Candidate	Votes	%
Republican	Brad Staats	5,462	26.4
Republican	Bob Ries	5,422	26.2
Republican	John Smith	4,200	20.3
Republican	Justin Jones	3,381	16.4
Republican	Tracey Tarum	2,212	10.7
Total votes		20,677	100.0

=== General election ===
==== Endorsements ====
Jim Cooper (D)

Labor unions

- International Brotherhood of Boilermakers
- National Association of Letter Carriers

Organizations

- Blue Dog Coalition

==== Predictions ====
Source	Ranking	As of
The Cook Political Report	Safe D	November 5, 2012
Rothenberg	Safe D	November 2, 2012
Roll Call	Safe D	November 4, 2012
Sabato's Crystal Ball	Safe D	November 5, 2012
NY Times	Safe D	November 4, 2012
RCP	Safe D	November 4, 2012
The Hill	Safe D	November 4, 2012

==== Results ====
Tennessee's 5th congressional district, 2012
Party	Candidate	Votes	%
Democratic	Jim Cooper (Incumbent)	171,621	65.2
Republican	Brad Staats	86,240	32.8
Green	John Miglietta	5,222	2.0
Total votes		263,083	100
Democratic hold			

== District 6 ==
2012 Tennessee's 6th congressional district election
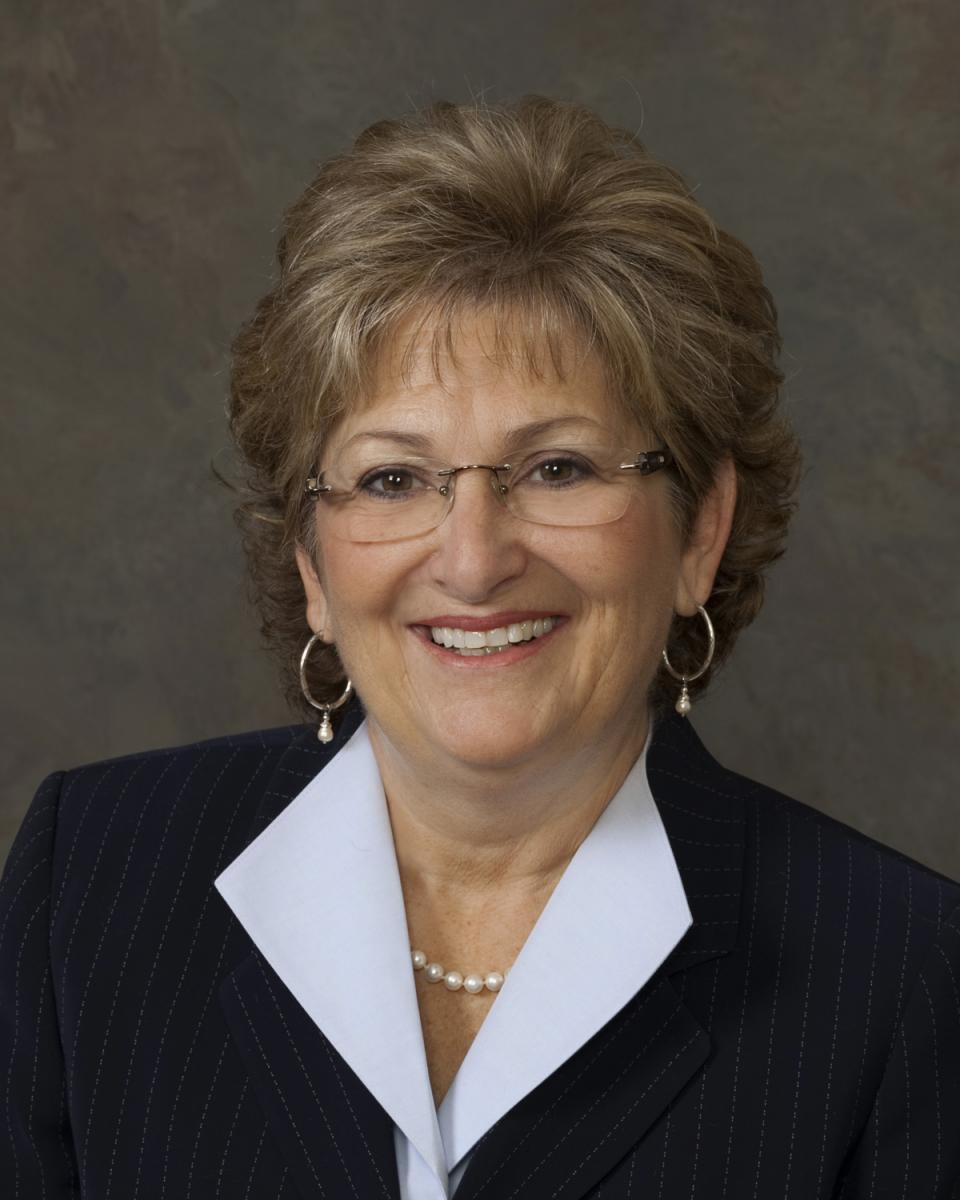

Nominee	Diane Black	Scott Beasley	Pat Riley
Party	Republican	Independent	Green
Popular vote	184,383	34,766	21,633
Percentage	76.4%	14.4%	9.0%
- County results Black: 60–70% 70–80% 80–90%
U.S. Representative before election
Diane Black
Republican
Elected U.S. Representative
Diane Black
Republican

The redrawn 6th district will represent Cannon, Clay, Coffee, Cumberland, DeKalb, Fentress, Jackson, Macon, Overton, Pickett, Putnam, Robertson, Smith, Sumner, Trousdale, White, and Wilson counties, and small northern parts of Cheatham and Van Buren counties. The most populous city in the district is Cookeville. Republican Diane Black who had represented the 6th district since January 2011 ran for re-election.

=== Republican primary ===
==== Candidates ====
===== Nominee =====
- Diane Black, incumbent U.S. Representative

===== Eliminated in primary =====
- Lou Ann Zelenik, business owner and candidate for this seat in 2010

==== Primary results ====
Republican primary results
Party	Candidate	Votes	%
Republican	Diane Black (Incumbent)	44,949	69.4
Republican	Lou Ann Zelenik	19,836	30.6
Total votes		64,785	100.0

=== General election ===
==== Endorsements ====
Diane Black (R)

Organizations

- Maggie's List
- Susan B. Anthony List

==== Predictions ====
Source	Ranking	As of
The Cook Political Report	Safe R	November 5, 2012
Rothenberg	Safe R	November 2, 2012
Roll Call	Safe R	November 4, 2012
Sabato's Crystal Ball	Safe R	November 5, 2012
NY Times	Safe R	November 4, 2012
RCP	Safe R	November 4, 2012
The Hill	Safe R	November 4, 2012

==== Results ====
Tennessee's 6th congressional district, 2012
Party	Candidate	Votes	%
Republican	Diane Black (Incumbent)	184,383	76.4
Independent	Scott Beasley	34,766	14.4
Green	Pat Riley	21,633	9.0
Total votes		241,241	100.0
Republican hold			

== District 7 ==
2012 Tennessee's 7th congressional district election
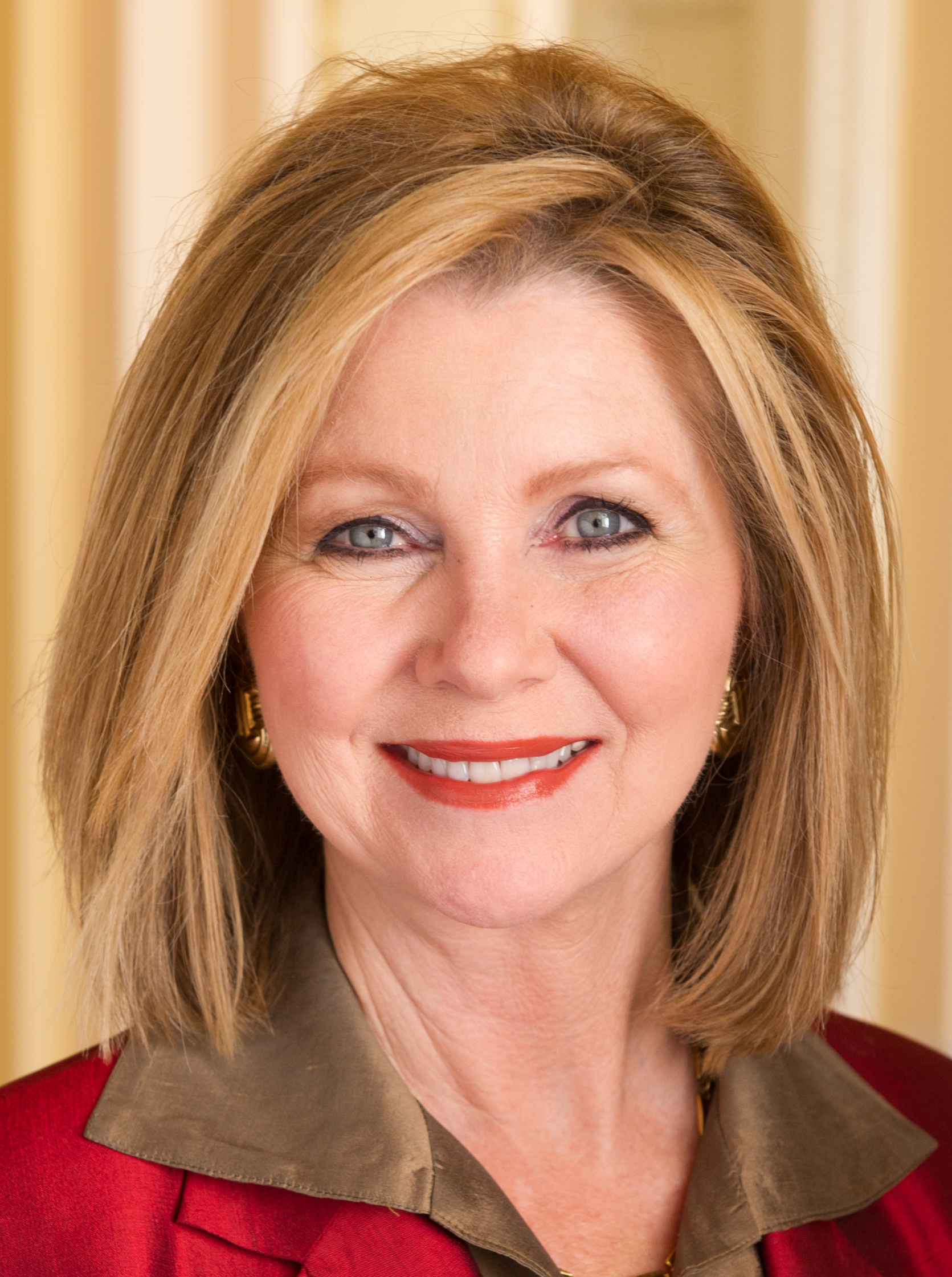

Nominee	Marsha Blackburn	Credo Amouzouvik
Party	Republican	Democratic
Popular vote	182,730	61,679
Percentage	71.0%	24.0%
- County results Blackburn: 50–60% 60–70% 70–80% 80–90%
U.S. Representative before election
Marsha Blackburn
Republican
Elected U.S. Representative
Marsha Blackburn
Republican

The redrawn 7th district will represent Chester, Decatur, Giles, Hardeman, Hardin, Henderson, Hickman, Houston, Humphreys, Lawrence, Lewis, McNairy, Montgomery, Perry, Stewart, Wayne, and Williamson counties, and parts of Benton and Maury counties. The most populous city in the district is Clarksville. It is significantly more compact than its predecessor, which stretched for 200 miles from east to west but was only two miles wide in some areas of the eastern portion. Republican Marsha Blackburn who had represented the 7th district since 2003 ran for re-election.

=== Republican primary ===
==== Candidates ====
===== Nominee =====
- Marsha Blackburn, incumbent U.S. Representative

==== Primary results ====
Republican primary results
Party	Candidate	Votes	%
Republican	Marsha Blackburn (Incumbent)	41,524	100.0
Total votes		41,524	100.0

=== Democratic primary ===
==== Candidates ====
===== Nominee =====
- Credo Amouzouvik, founder and CEO of the Homeffa Foundation(a humanitarian organization for Togo)

===== Withdrawn =====
- Chris Martin

==== Primary results ====
Democratic primary results
Party	Candidate	Votes	%
Democratic	Credo Amouzouvik	10,436	100.0
Total votes		10,436	100.0

=== General election ===
==== Endorsements ====
Marsha Blackburn (R)

Organizations

- Susan B. Anthony List

==== Predictions ====
Source	Ranking	As of
The Cook Political Report	Safe R	November 5, 2012
Rothenberg	Safe R	November 2, 2012
Roll Call	Safe R	November 4, 2012
Sabato's Crystal Ball	Safe R	November 5, 2012
NY Times	Safe R	November 4, 2012
RCP	Safe R	November 4, 2012
The Hill	Safe R	November 4, 2012

==== Results ====
Tennessee's 7th congressional district, 2012
Party	Candidate	Votes	%
Republican	Marsha Blackburn (Incumbent)	182,730	71.0
Democratic	Credo Amouzouvik	61,679	24.0
Green	Howard Switzer	4,640	1.8
Independent	Jack Arnold	4,256	1.7
Independent	William Akin	2,740	1.1
Independent	Lenny Ladner	1,261	0.5
Total votes		257,306	100
Republican hold			

== District 8 ==
2012 Tennessee's 8th congressional district election
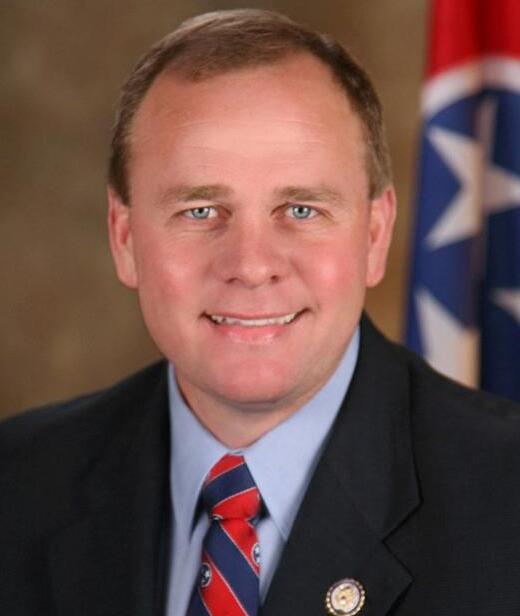

Nominee	Stephen Fincher	Timothy Dixon
Party	Republican	Democratic
Popular vote	190,923	79,490
Percentage	68.3%	28.4%
- County results Fincher: 50–60% 60–70% 70–80% Dixon 50–60%
U.S. Representative before election
Stephen Fincher
Republican
Elected U.S. Representative
Stephen Fincher
Republican

The redrawn 8th district will represent Carroll, Crockett, Dyer, Fayette, Gibson, Haywood, Henry, Lake, Lauderdale, Madison, Obion, Tipton, and Weakley counties, and parts of Benton and Shelby counties. The most populous city in the district is Jackson. The new district is significantly more Republican than its predecessor; the legislature pushed it further into the heavily Republican Memphis suburbs. Republican Stephen Fincher, who had represented the 8th district since January 2011, ran for re-election.

=== Republican primary ===
==== Candidates ====
===== Nominee =====
- Stephen Fincher, incumbent U.S. Representative

===== Eliminated in primary =====
- Annette Justice

==== Primary results ====
Republican primary results
Party	Candidate	Votes	%
Republican	Stephen Fincher (Incumbent)	60,355	86.7
Republican	Annette Justice	9,288	13.3
Total votes		69,643	100.0

=== Democratic primary ===
==== Candidates ====
===== Nominee =====
- Timothy Dixon, auto industry manager

===== Eliminated in primary =====
- John Bradley
- Christa Stoscheck

===== Declined =====
- Roy Herron, state senator and nominee for this seat in 2010

==== Primary results ====
Democratic primary results
Party	Candidate	Votes	%
Democratic	Timothy Dixon	6,951	37.9
Democratic	John Bradley	6,771	36.9
Democratic	Christa Stoscheck	4,621	25.2
Total votes		18,343	100.0

=== General election ===
==== Predictions ====
Source	Ranking	As of
The Cook Political Report	Safe R	November 5, 2012
Rothenberg	Safe R	November 2, 2012
Roll Call	Safe R	November 4, 2012
Sabato's Crystal Ball	Safe R	November 5, 2012
NY Times	Safe R	November 4, 2012
RCP	Safe R	November 4, 2012
The Hill	Safe R	November 4, 2012

==== Results ====
Tennessee's 8th congressional district, 2012
Party	Candidate	Votes	%
Republican	Stephen Fincher (Incumbent)	190,923	68.3
Democratic	Timothy Dixon	79,490	28.4
Independent	James L. Hart	6,139	2.2
Independent	Mark Rawles	2,870	1.1
Total votes		279,422	100
Republican hold			

==== By county ====
County	Stephen Fincher Republican		Timothy Dixon Democratic		Other votes	
County	%	#	%	#	%	#
Benton	56.25%	18	37.50%	12	6.25%	2
Carroll	68.07%	6,888	28.32%	2,866	3.61%	365
Crockett	77.95%	3,981	19.82%	1,012	2.23%	114
Dyer	75.41%	9,545	21.69%	2,746	2.90%	367
Fayette	68.42%	11,344	28.46%	4,719	3.12%	517
Gibson	70.21%	12,121	26.48	4,572	3.30%	570
Haywood	45.72%	3,229	50.90%	3,595	3.38%	239
Henry	61.44%	6,874	29.51%	3,311	8.97%	1,004
Lake	56.77%	1,056	38.98%	725	4.25%	79
Lauderdale	61.72%	4,730	35.53%	2,723	2.75%	211
Madison	57.02%	21,644	39.49%	15,002	3.49%	1,326
Obion	68.48%	7,794	27.87%	3,172	3.65%	416
Shelby	72.81%	78,491	24.71%	26,634	2.49%	2,681
Tipton	72.52%	15,206	24.06%	5,044	3.42%	718
Weakley	68.00%	7,982	28.60%	3,357	3.41%	400

== District 9 ==
2012 Tennessee's 9th congressional district election
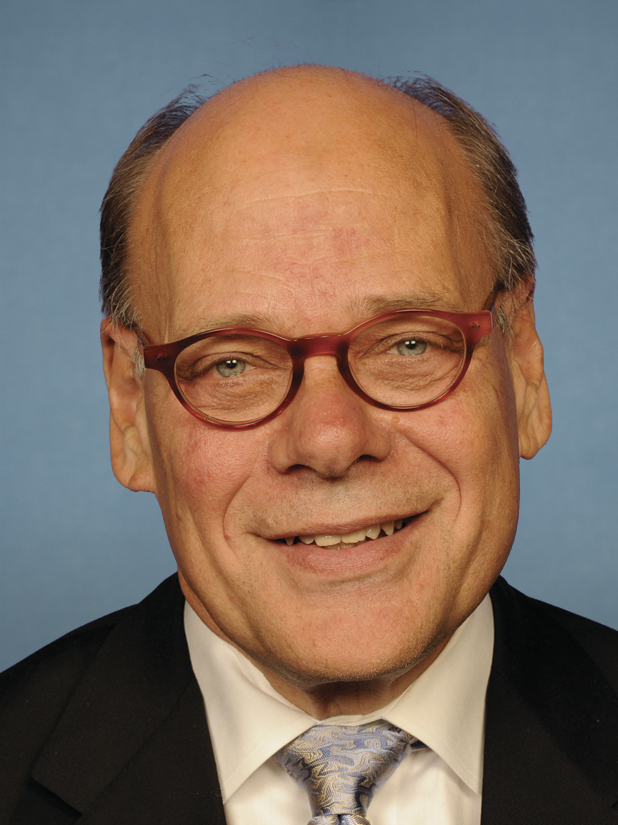

Nominee	Steve Cohen	George Flinn Jr.
Party	Democratic	Republican
Popular vote	188,422	59,742
Percentage	75.1%	23.8%
- County result Cohen: 70–80%
U.S. Representative before election
Steve Cohen
Democratic
Elected U.S. Representative
Steve Cohen
Democratic

The redrawn 9th district will represent most of Shelby County, and is based around Memphis. Democrat Steve Cohen, who had represented the 9th district since 2007, ran for re-election.

=== Democratic primary ===
==== Candidates ====
===== Nominee =====
- Steve Cohen, incumbent U.S. Representative

===== Eliminated in primary =====
- Tomeka Hart, Memphis City Schools board member

===== Withdrawn =====
- Thomas Long, Memphis City Court Clerk

==== Primary results ====
Democratic primary results
Party	Candidate	Votes	%
Democratic	Steve Cohen (Incumbent)	49,585	89.3
Democratic	Tomeka Hart	5,944	10.7
Total votes		55,529	100.0

=== Republican primary ===
==== Candidates ====
===== Nominee =====
- George Flinn, radiologist, radio magnate and candidate for the 8th district in 2010

===== Eliminated in primary =====
- Charlotte Bergmann, business manager and nominee for this seat in 2010
- Ernest Lunati
- Rollin Stooksberry

==== Primary results ====
Republican primary results
Party	Candidate	Votes	%
Republican	George Flinn	11,748	63.9
Republican	Charlotte Bergmann	4,398	23.9
Republican	Rollin Stooksberry	1,858	10.1
Republican	Ernest Lunati	368	2.0
Total votes		18,372	100.0

=== General election ===
==== Endorsements ====
Steve Cohen (D)

Labor unions

- International Brotherhood of Boilermakers
- National Association of Letter Carriers

==== Predictions ====
Source	Ranking	As of
The Cook Political Report	Safe D	November 5, 2012
Rothenberg	Safe D	November 2, 2012
Roll Call	Safe D	November 4, 2012
Sabato's Crystal Ball	Safe D	November 5, 2012
NY Times	Safe D	November 4, 2012
RCP	Safe D	November 4, 2012
The Hill	Safe D	November 4, 2012

==== Results ====
Tennessee's 9th congressional district, 2012
Party	Candidate	Votes	%
Democratic	Steve Cohen (Incumbent)	188,422	75.1
Republican	George Flinn Jr.	59,742	23.8
Independent	Gregory Joiner	1,372	0.5
Independent	Brian Saulsberry	1,448	0.6
Total votes		250,984	100
Democratic hold			

== See also ==
- 2012 Tennessee elections
- 2012 United States elections

Official campaign websites
- District 1
  - Phil Roe campaign website
  - Alan Woodruff campaign website
- District 3
  - Ron Bhalla campaign website
  - Chuck Fleischmann campaign website
  - Mary Headrick campaign website
  - Jean Howard-Hill campaign website
  - Scottie Mayfield campaign website
  - Bill Taylor campaign website
  - Weston Wamp campaign website
- District 4
  - Scott DesJarlais campaign website
  - Eric Stewart campaign website
- District 7
  - Credo Amouzouvik campaign website
  - Howard Switzer campaign website
- District 8
  - Stephen Fincher campaign website
- District 9
  - Charlotte Bergmann campaign website
  - Steve Cohen campaign website
  - George Flinn campaign website
