= 2012 Tennessee elections =

Tennessee state elections in 2012 were held on Tuesday, November 6, 2012. Primary elections for the United States Senate, United States House of Representatives, Tennessee Senate, and Tennessee House of Representatives, as well as various judicial retention elections, were held on August 2, 2012.

== Presidential election ==
=== President of the United States ===
Final results by county: Romney: 50–60%; 60–70%; 70–80%; Obama: 50–60%; 60–70%

In 2012, Tennessee was a stronghold for the Republican Party, and was considered a reliable "red state." Tennessee had 11 electoral votes in the Electoral College at the time. In the general election, Republican candidate Mitt Romney won the state with 59.42% of the vote to Incumbent Democratic President Obama's 39.04%.

The presidential primaries were held on March 6, 2012. Rick Santorum won Tennessee's Republican primary over former governor Mitt Romney of Massachusetts. Incumbent President Barack Obama won the Democratic primary, running unopposed.

=== Results ===
2012 United States presidential election in Tennessee
Party	Candidate	Running mate	Votes	Percentage	Electoral votes
Republican	Mitt Romney	Paul Ryan	1,462,330	59.42%	11
Democratic	Barack Obama	Joe Biden	960,709	39.04%	0
Libertarian	Gary Johnson	Jim Gray	18,623	0.67%	0
Green	Jill Stein	Cheri Honkala	6,515	0.26%	0
Constitution	Virgil Goode	Jim Clymer	6,022	0.24%	0
Justice	Rocky Anderson	Luis J. Rodriguez	2,639	0.11%	0
American Third Position	Merlin Miller	Virginia D. Abernethy	1,739	0.07%	0
Totals			2,458,577	100.00%	11

=== March 6, 2012, Primary Results ===
2012 Tennessee Democratic presidential primary
- March 6, 2012

82 pledged delegates to the 2012 Democratic National Convention

Candidate	Barack Obama	Uncommitted
Home state	Illinois	N/A
Delegate count	82	0
Popular vote	80,357	10,497
Percentage	88.48%	11.51%
- Primary results by county Obama: 60–65% 65–70% 70–75% 75–80% 80–85% 85–90% 90–95% 95–100%

2012 Tennessee Democratic presidential primary
Candidate	Votes	%	Delegates
Barack Obama (incumbent)	80,705	88.48%	82
Uncommitted	10,497	11.51%	
John Wolfe Jr. (write-in)	7	0.01%	
Total	91,209	100%	82

2012 Tennessee Republican presidential primary
- March 6, 2012

58 Republican National Convention delegates
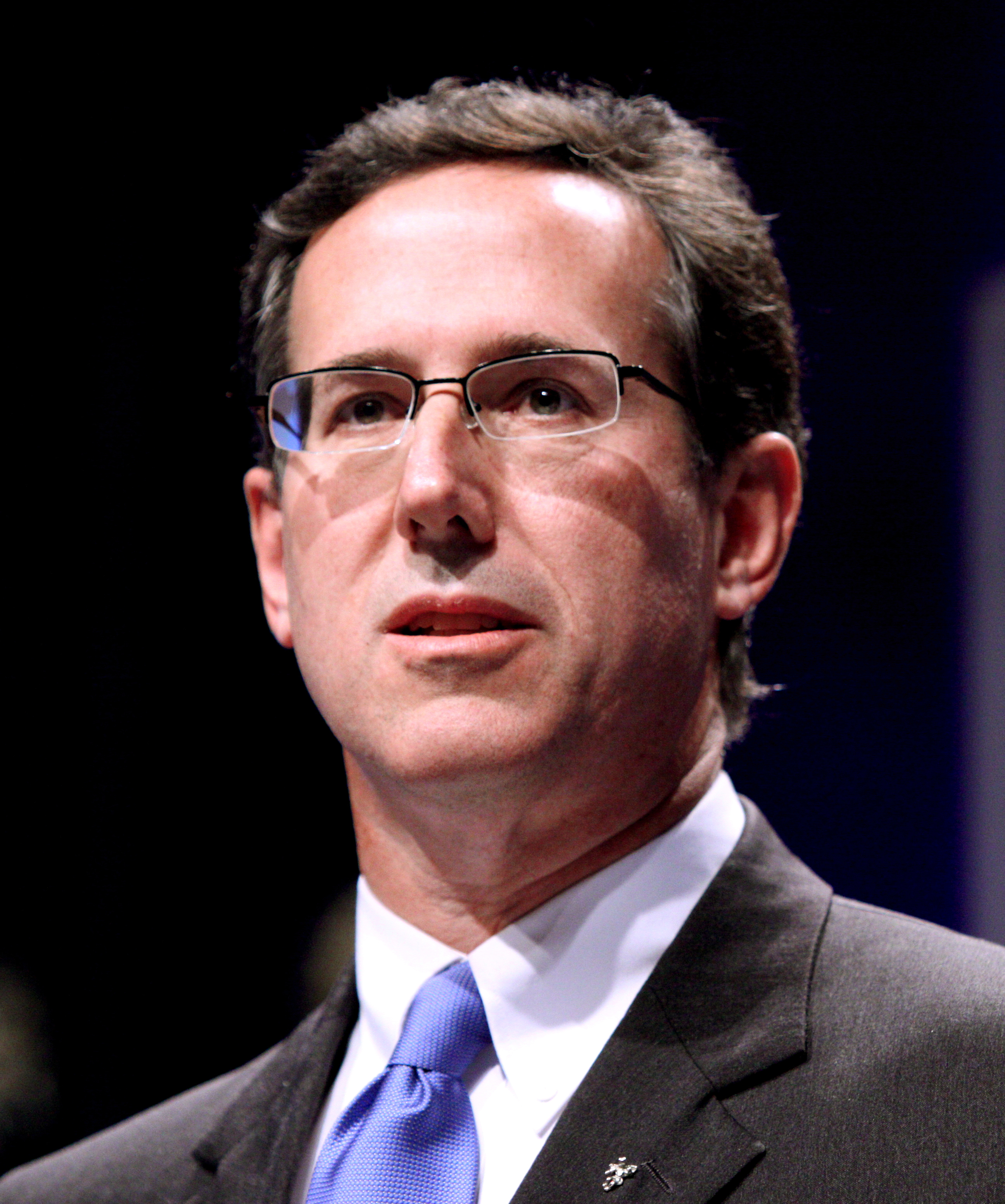

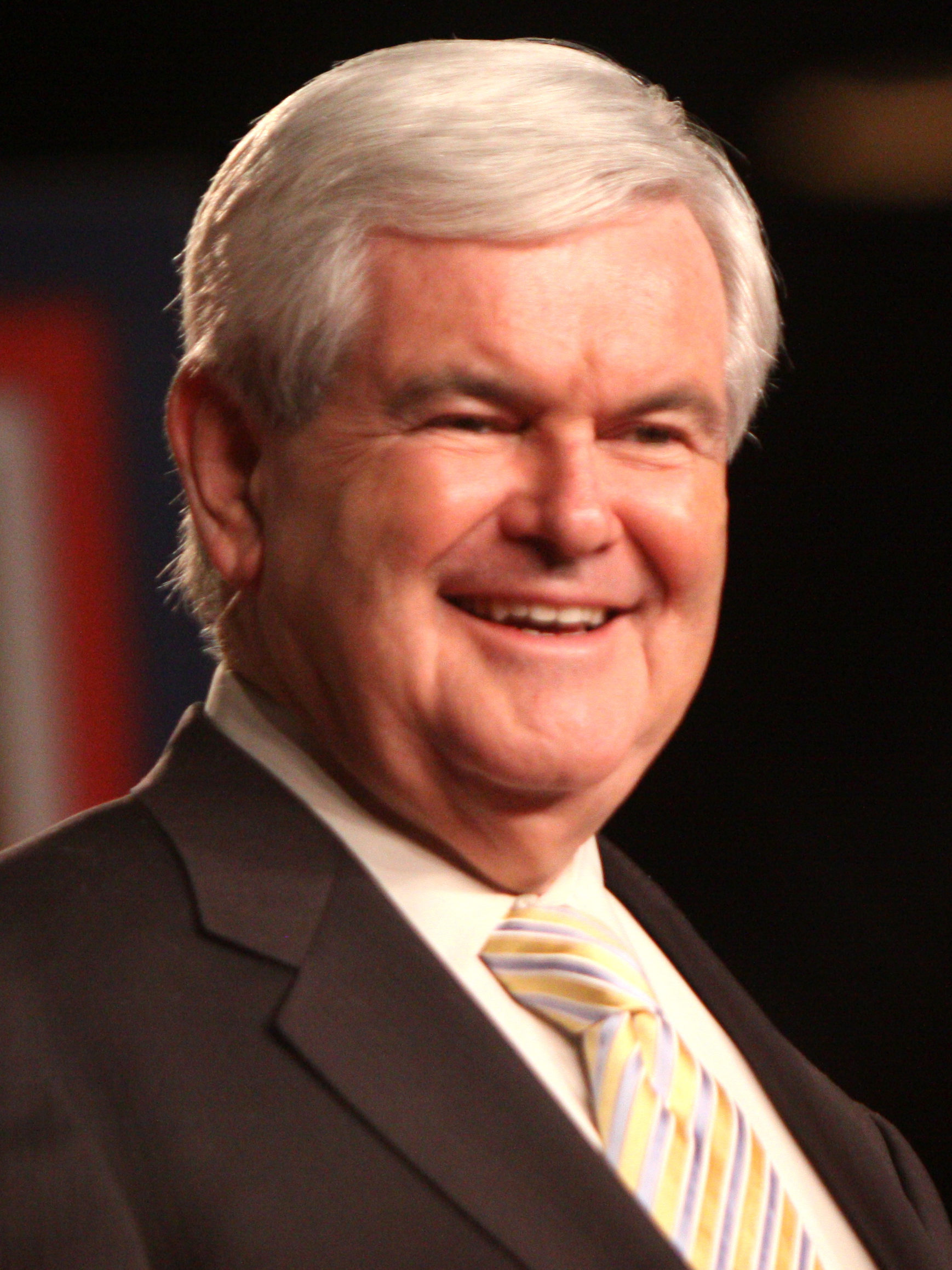

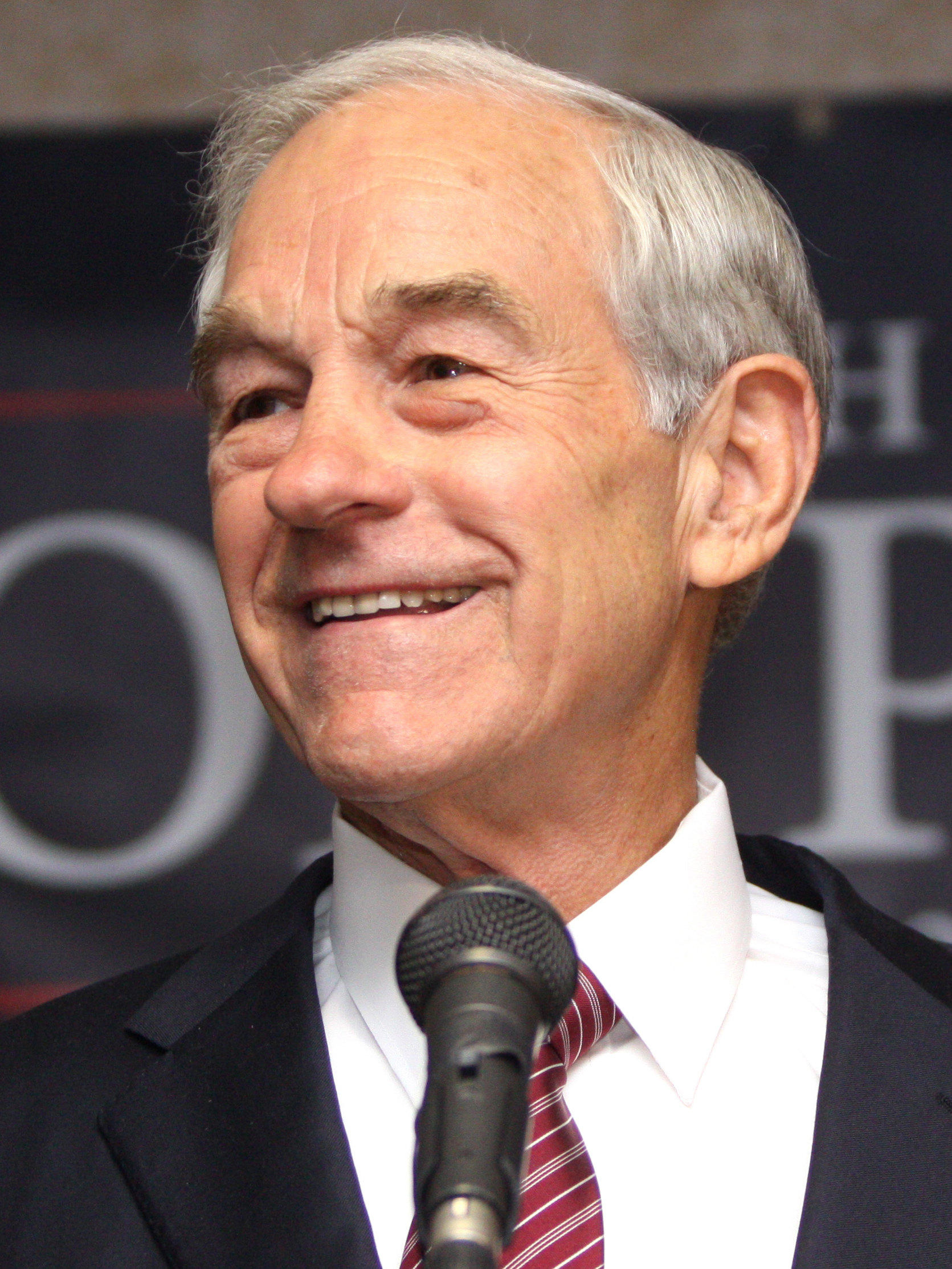
Candidate	Rick Santorum	Mitt Romney
Home state	Pennsylvania	Massachusetts
Delegate count	29	14
Popular vote	205,809	155,630
Percentage	37.11%	28.06%
Candidate	Newt Gingrich	Ron Paul
Home state	Georgia	Texas
Delegate count	9	0
Popular vote	132,889	50,156
Percentage	23.96%	9.04%

Santorum
Romney
Gingrich
Santorum 30 – 40% 40 – 50% 50 – 60%	Romney 30 – 40%	Gingrich 30 – 40%

2012 Tennessee Republican presidential primary
Candidate	Votes	Percentage	Projected delegate count		
Candidate	Votes	Percentage	NYT	CNN	FOX
Rick Santorum	205,809	37.11%	29	27	26
Mitt Romney	155,630	28.06%	14	15	12
Newt Gingrich	132,889	23.96%	9	8	9
Ron Paul	50,156	9.04%	0	0	0
Rick Perry (withdrawn)	1,966	0.35%	0	0	0
Michele Bachmann (withdrawn)	1,895	0.34%	0	0	0
Jon Huntsman (withdrawn)	1,239	0.22%	0	0	0
Buddy Roemer (withdrawn)	881	0.16%	0	0	0
Gary Johnson (withdrawn)	572	0.10%	0	0	0
Uncommitted	3,536	0.64%	0	0	0
Unprojected delegates:			6	8	9
Total:	554,573	100.00%	58	58	58

== United States Congress ==
=== Senate ===
Final results by county: Corker: 40–50%; 50–60%; 60–70%; 70–80%; 80–90%; Clayton: 50–60%

Incumbent Republican U.S. Senator Bob Corker won a second term in a landslide, carrying all but two counties in the state.

=== Results ===
United States Senate election in Tennessee, 2012
Party	Candidate	Votes	%	±%
Republican	Bob Corker (incumbent)	1,506,443	64.89%	+14.18%
Democratic	Mark Clayton	705,882	30.41%	−17.59%
Green	Martin Pleasant	38,472	1.66%	+1.52%
Independent	Shaun Crowell	20,936	0.90%	N/A
Constitution	Kermit Steck	18,620	0.80%	N/A
Independent	James Higdon	8,085	0.35%	N/A
Independent	Michael Joseph Long	8,080	0.35%	N/A
Independent	Troy Stephen Scoggin	7,148	0.31%	N/A
Independent	David Gatchell	6,523	0.28%	N/A
n/a	Write-ins	1,288	0.05%	N/A
Total votes		2,321,477	100.00%	N/A
Republican hold				

August 2, 2012, Primary Results

Results by county: Mark Clayton Gary G. Davis Park Overall David Hancock

Democratic primary results
Party	Candidate	Votes	%
Democratic	Mark E. Clayton	48,126	29.99%
Democratic	Gary Gene Davis	24,789	15.45%
Democratic	Park Overall	24,263	15.12%
Democratic	Larry Crim	17,383	10.83%
Democratic	Benjamin Roberts	16,369	10.20%
Democratic	David Hancock	16,167	10.08
Democratic	Thomas Owens	13,366	8.33
Total votes		160,463	100.00

Tennessee Republican primary
Party	Candidate	Votes	%
Republican	Bob Corker (Incumbent)	389,483	85.25%
Republican	Zach Poskevich	28,299	6.19%
Republican	Fred Anderson	15,942	3.49%
Republican	Mark Twain Clemens	11,788	2.58%
Republican	Brenda Lenard	11,378	2.49%
Total votes		456,890	100.00%

=== House of Representatives ===
District results: Republican: 50–60%; 60–70%; 70–80%; Democratic: 60–70%; 70–80%

Tennessee elected nine U.S. representatives, each representing one of Tennessee's nine congressional districts.

=== Results ===
District	Incumbent	Party	First elected	Result	Candidates
Tennessee 1	Phil Roe	Republican	2008	Incumbent re-elected.	✓ Phil Roe (Republican) 76.1%; Alan Woodruff (Democratic) 19.9%; Karen Brackett (Independent) 2.0%
Tennessee 2	Jimmy Duncan	Republican	1988 (Special)	Incumbent re-elected.	✓ Jimmy Duncan (Republican) 74.5%; Troy Goodale (Democratic) 20.5%; Greg Samples (Independent) 1.7%; Paul Coker (Independent); Brandon Stewart (Independent)
Tennessee 3	Chuck Fleischmann	Republican	2010	Incumbent re-elected.	✓ Chuck Fleischmann (Republican) 61.5%; Mary Headrick (Democratic) 35.5%; Matthew Deniston (Independent) 3.1%
Tennessee 4	Scott DesJarlais	Republican	2010	Incumbent re-elected.	✓ Scott DesJarlais (Republican) 55.8%; Eric Stewart (Democratic) 44.2%
Tennessee 5	Jim Cooper	Democratic	1982; 1994 (retired); 2002	Incumbent re-elected.	✓ Jim Cooper (Democratic) 65.2%; Brad Staats (Republican) 32.8%; John Miglietta (Green) 2.0%
Tennessee 6	Diane Black	Republican	2010	Incumbent re-elected.	✓ Diane Black (Republican) 76.6%; Robert Beasley (Independent) 14.4%; Pat Riley (Green) 9.0%
Tennessee 7	Marsha Blackburn	Republican	2002	Incumbent re-elected.	✓ Marsha Blackburn (Republican) 71.0%; Credo Amouzouvik (Democratic) 24.0%; Howard Switzer (Green) 1.8%; Jack Arnold (Independent) 1.7%; William Akin (Independent) 1.1%; Lenny Ladner (Independent) 0.5%
Tennessee 8	Stephen Fincher	Republican	2010	Incumbent re-elected.	✓ Stephen Fincher (Republican) 68.3%; Timothy Dixon (Democratic) 28.4%; James Hart (Independent) 2.2%; Mark Rawles (Independent) 1.0%
Tennessee 9	Steve Cohen	Democratic	2006	Incumbent re-elected.	✓ Steve Cohen (Democratic) 75.1%; George Flinn (Republican) 23.8%; Brian Saulsberry (Independent) 0.6%; Gregory Joiner (Independent) 0.5%

Popular vote
Republican	60.55%
Democratic	35.21%
Other	4.24%

House seats
Republican	77.78%
Democratic	22.22%

== State legislature ==
=== State Senate ===
Results by senate districts

Winners:

Republican hold
Democratic hold
Republican gain
No election

Elections for 16 of the 33 seats in Tennessee's State Senate were held on November 6, 2012.

After this election, Republicans had 26 seats while Democrats had 7 seats, with Republicans gaining six seats.

=== State House of Representatives ===
Results by State House districts

Winners:

Republican hold
Democratic hold
Independent Republican hold
Republican gain
Democratic gain

The election of all 99 seats in the Tennessee House of Representatives occurred on November 6, 2012.

Republicans won 71 seats, while Democrats won 27 seats, and Independents won 1 seat. Republicans gained seven seats during this election.

== See also ==
- Elections in Tennessee
- Political party strength in Tennessee
- Tennessee Democratic Party
- Tennessee Republican Party
- Government of Tennessee
- 2012 United States elections
