= 2012 Tennessee Democratic presidential primary =

- March 6, 2012

82 pledged delegates to the 2012 Democratic National Convention

Candidate	Barack Obama	Uncommitted
Home state	Illinois	N/A
Delegate count	82	0
Popular vote	80,357	10,497
Percentage	88.48%	11.51%
- County results Obama: 60–65% 65–70% 70–75% 75–80% 80–85% 85–90% 90–95% 95–100%

The 2012 Tennessee Democratic presidential primary took place on Tuesday, March 6, 2012, as part of Super Tuesday along with other primaries and caucuses. Tennessee's 82 pledged delegates to the Democratic National Convention were allocated based on the results of the primary.

Incumbent President Barack Obama won the primary in a landslide, facing no major opposition to his candidacy.

== Procedure ==
Pledged national convention delegates
Type	Del.
CD 1	5
CD 2	6
CD 3	5
CD 4	5
CD 5	7
CD 6	6
CD 7	6
CD 8	6
CD 9	7
PLEO	11
At-large	18
Total pledged delegates	82

Tennessee was allocated 91 delegates to the Democratic National Convention: 82 were allocated based on the results of the primary, with the other nine being unpledged superdelegates.

In order to qualify for delegates, a candidate had to receive at least 15% of the vote statewide or in at least one congressional district. 53 of Tennessee's delegates were allotted among the state's nine congressional districts. The remaining 29 delegates were allocated based on the statewide popular vote, consisting of 18 at-large delegates and 11 pledged PLEOs (party leaders and elected officials).

== Results ==
Barack Obama won the primary with over 88% of the vote and received all of the state's delegates. 11.5% of votes were cast for uncommitted delegates, while John Wolfe Jr., who had qualified as a write-in candidate, received seven votes.

2012 Tennessee Democratic presidential primary
Candidate	Votes	%	Delegates
Barack Obama (incumbent)	80,705	88.48%	82
Uncommitted	10,497	11.51%	
John Wolfe Jr. (write-in)	7	0.01%	
Total	91,209	100.00%	82

=== Results by county ===
2012 Tennessee Democratic presidential primary (results per county)
County	Barack Obama		Uncommitted		John Wolfe Jr.		Total votes cast
County	Votes	%	Votes	%	Votes	%	Total votes cast
Anderson	887	84.64%	159	15.17%	2	0.19%	1,048
Bedford	254	77.68%	73	22.32%	0	0.00%	327
Benton	524	71.10%	213	28.90%	0	0.00%	737
Bledsoe	348	77.33%	102	22.67%	0	0.00%	450
Blount	402	87.77%	56	12.23%	0	0.00%	458
Bradley	415	83.17%	84	16.83%	0	0.00%	499
Campbell	316	79.00%	84	21.00%	0	0.00%	400
Cannon	116	78.38%	32	21.62%	0	0.00%	148
Carroll	238	86.23%	38	13.77%	0	0.00%	276
Carter	143	85.12%	25	14.88%	0	0.00%	168
Cheatham	214	88.07%	29	11.93%	0	0.00%	243
Chester	72	83.72%	14	16.28%	0	0.00%	86
Claiborne	117	84.17%	22	15.83%	0	0.00%	139
Clay	60	90.91%	6	9.09%	0	0.00%	66
Cocke	75	89.29%	9	10.71%	0	0.00%	84
Coffee	430	80.37%	105	19.63%	0	0.00%	535
Crockett	328	65.86%	170	34.14%	0	0.00%	498
Cumberland	593	81.79%	132	18.21%	0	0.00%	725
Davidson	15,452	94.28%	937	5.72%	0	0.00%	16,389
Decatur	102	83.61%	20	16.39%	0	0.00%	122
Dekalb	580	73.23%	212	26.77%	0	0.00%	792
Dickson	374	88.84%	47	11.16%	0	0.00%	421
Dyer	202	85.23%	35	14.77%	0	0.00%	237
Fayette	347	95.86%	15	4.14%	0	0.00%	362
Fentress	165	90.16%	18	9.84%	0	0.00%	183
Franklin	838	78.83%	225	21.17%	0	0.00%	1,063
Gibson	598	86.67%	92	13.33%	0	0.00%	690
Giles	220	87.30%	32	12.70%	0	0.00%	252
Grainger	81	81.82%	18	18.18%	0	0.00%	99
Greene	257	87.41%	37	12.59%	0	0.00%	294
Grundy	235	77.30%	69	22.70%	0	0.00%	304
Hamblen	204	92.73%	16	7.27%	0	0.00%	220
Hamilton	4,956	95.81%	214	4.14%	3	0.06%	5,173
Hancock	22	100.00%	0	0.00%	0	0.00%	22
Hardeman	968	78.32%	268	21.68%	0	0.00%	1,236
Hardin	106	82.17%	23	17.83%	0	0.00%	129
Hawkins	304	79.58%	78	20.42%	0	0.00%	382
Haywood	473	97.73%	11	2.27%	0	0.00%	484
Henderson	50	80.65%	12	19.35%	0	0.00%	62
Henry	797	65.70%	416	34.30%	0	0.00%	1,213
Hickman	153	84.07%	29	15.93%	0	0.00%	182
Houston	115	91.27%	11	8.73%	0	0.00%	126
Humphreys	258	89.58%	30	10.42%	0	0.00%	288
Jackson	172	82.30%	37	17.70%	0	0.00%	209
Jefferson	171	88.60%	22	11.40%	0	0.00%	193
Johnson	90	88.24%	12	11.76%	0	0.00%	102
Knox	2,464	91.23%	237	8.77%	0	0.00%	2,701
Lake	70	87.50%	10	12.50%	0	0.00%	80
Lauderdale	210	87.50%	30	12.50%	0	0.00%	240
Lawrence	191	80.93%	45	19.07%	0	0.00%	236
Lewis	76	79.17%	20	20.83%	0	0.00%	96
Lincoln	212	85.83%	35	14.17%	0	0.00%	247
Loudon	285	91.35%	27	8.65%	0	0.00%	312
Macon	95	85.59%	16	14.41%	0	0.00%	111
Madison	723	94.39%	43	5.61%	0	0.00%	766
Marion	1,337	63.46%	768	36.45%	2	0.09%	2,107
Marshall	193	85.78%	32	14.22%	0	0.00%	225
Maury	1,801	86.50%	281	13.50%	0	0.00%	2,082
McMinn	265	86.32%	42	13.68%	0	0.00%	307
Mcnairy	173	83.57%	34	16.43%	0	0.00%	207
Meigs	182	85.85%	30	14.15%	0	0.00%	212
Monroe	207	91.59%	19	8.41%	0	0.00%	226
Montgomery	1,326	91.13%	129	8.87%	0	0.00%	1,455
Moore	34	85.00%	6	15.00%	0	0.00%	40
Morgan	76	79.17%	20	20.83%	0	0.00%	96
Obion	169	78.24%	47	21.76%	0	0.00%	216
Overton	844	75.76%	270	24.24%	0	0.00%	1,114
Perry	61	87.14%	9	12.86%	0	0.00%	70
Pickett	23	95.83%	1	4.17%	0	0.00%	24
Polk	711	70.33%	300	29.67%	0	0.00%	1,011
Putnam	1,119	68.02%	526	31.98%	0	0.00%	1,645
Rhea	288	77.21%	85	22.79%	0	0.00%	373
Roane	335	82.51%	71	17.49%	0	0.00%	406
Robertson	356	84.36%	66	15.64%	0	0.00%	422
Rutherford	1,753	87.61%	248	12.39%	0	0.00%	2,001
Scott	302	83.43%	60	16.57%	0	0.00%	362
Sequatchie	141	81.03%	33	18.97%	0	0.00%	174
Sevier	354	81.94%	78	18.06%	0	0.00%	432
Shelby	22,827	98.23%	412	1.77%	0	0.00%	23,239
Smith	176	85.44%	30	14.56%	0	0.00%	206
Stewart	290	89.23%	35	10.77%	0	0.00%	325
Sullivan	442	86.33%	70	13.67%	0	0.00%	512
Sumner	1,665	86.36%	263	13.64%	0	0.00%	1,928
Tipton	237	87.78%	33	12.22%	0	0.00%	270
Trousdale	140	93.33%	10	6.67%	0	0.00%	150
Unicoi	52	77.61%	15	22.39%	0	0.00%	67
Union	66	69.47%	29	30.53%	0	0.00%	95
Van Buren	346	71.93%	135	28.07%	0	0.00%	481
Warren	2,116	64.45%	1,167	35.55%	0	0.00%	3,283
Washington	380	85.97%	62	14.03%	0	0.00%	442
Wayne	65	89.04%	8	10.96%	0	0.00%	73
Weakley	252	75.68%	81	24.32%	0	0.00%	333
White	199	75.67%	64	24.33%	0	0.00%	263
Williamson	559	90.45%	59	9.55%	0	0.00%	618
Wilson	695	85.59%	117	14.41%	0	0.00%	812
Total	80,705	88.48%	10,497	11.51%	7	0.01%	91,209

== See also ==
- 2012 Tennessee Republican presidential primary
- 2012 Democratic Party presidential primaries
- 2012 United States presidential election in Tennessee
- 2012 Tennessee elections
