= 2010 United States House of Representatives elections in Tennessee =

- November 2, 2010

All 9 Tennessee seats to the United States House of Representatives
- Turnout: 41.32% ▼25.02 pp
	Majority party	Minority party
Party	Republican	Democratic
Last election	4	5
Seats won	7	2
Seat change	▲3	▼3
Popular vote	955,078	541,527
Percentage	61.26%	34.73%
Swing	▲18.83%	▼17.24%

Republican hold Republican gain
Democratic hold
Republican
40–50%
50–60%
60–70%
70–80%
80–90%
Democratic
40–50%
50–60%
70–80%

The 2010 United States House of Representatives elections in Tennessee was held on November 2, 2010, to elect the nine U.S. representatives from the state of Tennessee, one from each of the state's nine congressional districts.

During the general elections, the Republicans flipped Tennessee's 4th, 6th, and 8th congressional districts, which changed Tennessee's House delegation from a 5-4 Democratic majority to a 7-2 Republican majority.

== Overview ==
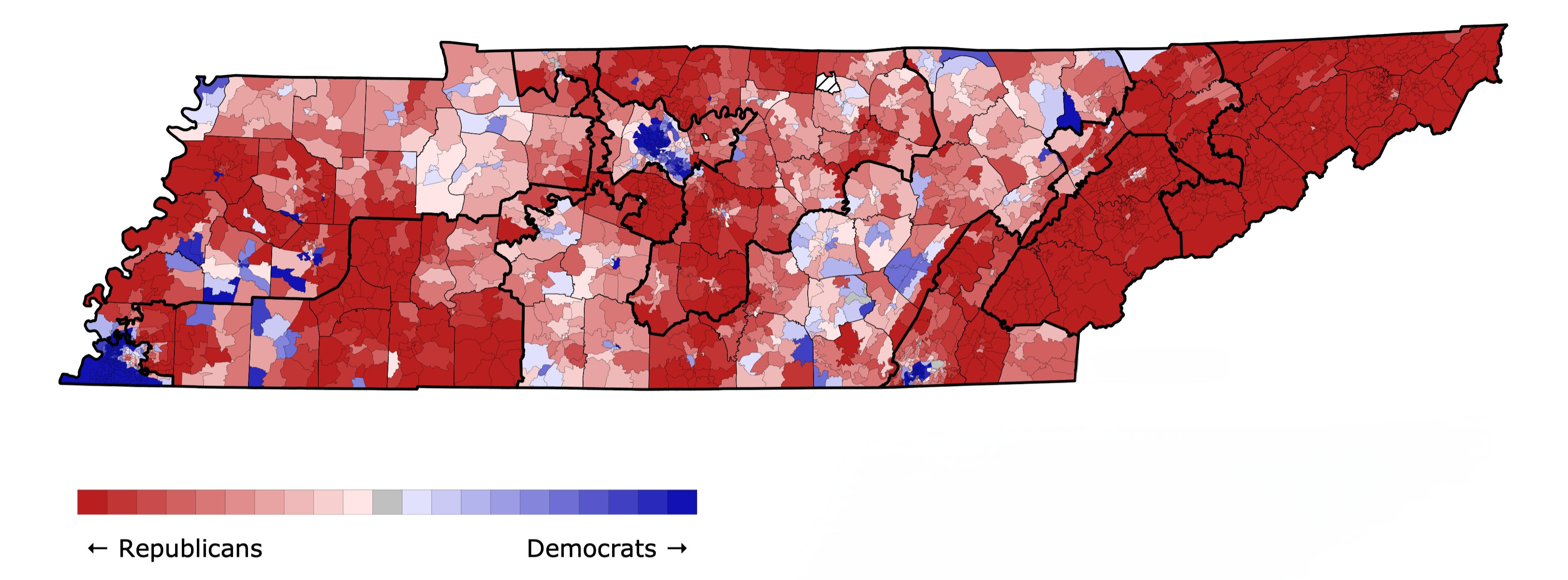
District results by precinct

United States House of Representatives elections in Tennessee, 2010
Party	Votes	Percentage	Seats Before	Seats After	+/–
Republican	955,078	61.26%	4	7	▲3
Democratic	541,527	34.73%	5	2	▼3
Independent	62,515	4.01%	0	0	0
Write-in	9	0.00%	0	0	0
Totals	1,559,129	100.00%	9	9	—

Popular vote
Republican	61.26%
Democratic	34.73%
Other	4.01%

House seats
Republican	77.78%
Democratic	22.22%

=== By district ===
Results of the 2010 United States House of Representatives elections in Tennessee by district:

District	Republican		Democratic		Others		Total		Result
District	Votes	%	Votes	%	Votes	%	Votes	%	Result
District 1	123,006	80.84%	26,045	17.12%	3,110	2.04%	152,161	100.0%	Republican hold
District 2	141,796	81.78%	25,400	14.65%	6,184	3.57%	173,380	100.0%	Republican hold
District 3	92,032	56.79%	45,387	28.01%	24,637	15.20%	162,056	100.0%	Republican hold
District 4	103,969	57.07%	70,254	38.56%	7,968	4.37%	182,191	100.0%	Republican gain
District 5	74,204	42.07%	99,162	56.23%	2,996	1.70%	176,362	100.0%	Democratic hold
District 6	128,517	67.26%	56,145	29.38%	6,422	3.36%	191,084	100.0%	Republican gain
District 7	158,916	72.37%	54,347	24.75%	6,320	2.88%	219,583	100.0%	Republican hold
District 8	98,759	58.99%	64,960	38.80%	3,686	2.20%	167,405	100.0%	Republican gain
District 9	33,879	25.11%	99,827	74.00%	1,201	0.89%	134,907	100.0%	Democratic hold
Total	955,078	61.26%	541,527	34.73%	62,524	4.01%	1,559,129	100.0%	

== District 1 ==
2010 Tennessee's 1st congressional district election
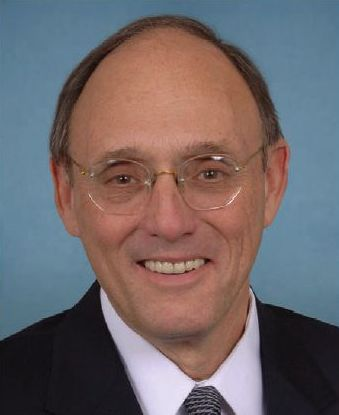

Nominee	Phil Roe	Michael Clark
Party	Republican	Democratic
Popular vote	123,006	26,045
Percentage	80.84%	17.12%
- County results Roe: 70–80% 80–90%
U.S. Representative before election
Phil Roe
Republican
Elected U.S. Representative
Phil Roe
Republican

This district covers northeast Tennessee, including all of Carter, Cocke, Greene, Hamblen, Hancock, Hawkins, Johnson, Sullivan, Unicoi, and Washington counties and parts of Jefferson County and Sevier County. It had been represented by Republican Phil Roe since 2009. The winner of the GOP primary was all but assured of representing the district in Congress as this is one of the safest seats for the GOP; it had held the seat continuously since 1881 and, since prior to the Civil War, the GOP or its predecessors had held the seat for all but four years.

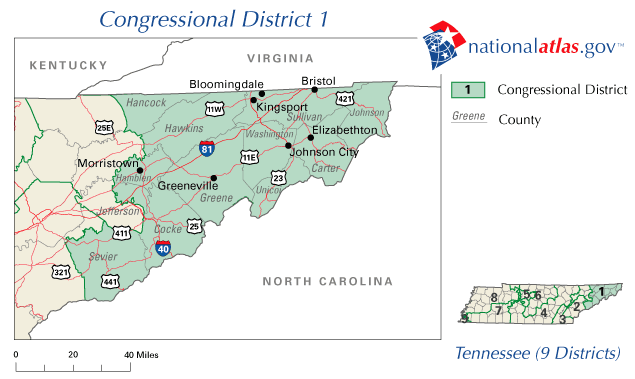

=== Democratic primary ===
- Michael Clark

Democratic primary results
Party	Candidate	Votes	%
Democratic	Michael Clark	9,012	100.0
Total votes		9,012	100.0

=== Republican primary ===
- Phil Roe, incumbent
- Mahmood "Michael" Sabri

Republican primary results
Party	Candidate	Votes	%
Republican	Phil Roe (incumbent)	78,862	95.7
Republican	Mahmood "Michael" Sabri	3,546	4.3
Total votes		82,408	100.0

=== General election ===
- Race ranking and details from CQ Politics
- Campaign contributions from OpenSecrets
- Race profile at The New York Times

==== Predictions ====
Source	Ranking	As of
The Cook Political Report	Safe R	November 1, 2010
Rothenberg	Safe R	November 1, 2010
Sabato's Crystal Ball	Safe R	November 1, 2010
RCP	Safe R	November 1, 2010
CQ Politics	Safe R	October 28, 2010
New York Times	Safe R	November 1, 2010
FiveThirtyEight	Safe R	November 1, 2010

Tennessee's 1st congressional district, 2010
Party	Candidate	Votes	%
Republican	Phil Roe (incumbent)	123,006	80.84%
Democratic	Michael Clark	26,045	17.12%
Independent	Kermit Steck	3,110	2.04%
Total votes		152,161	100.00%
Republican hold			

== District 2 ==
2010 Tennessee's 2nd congressional district election
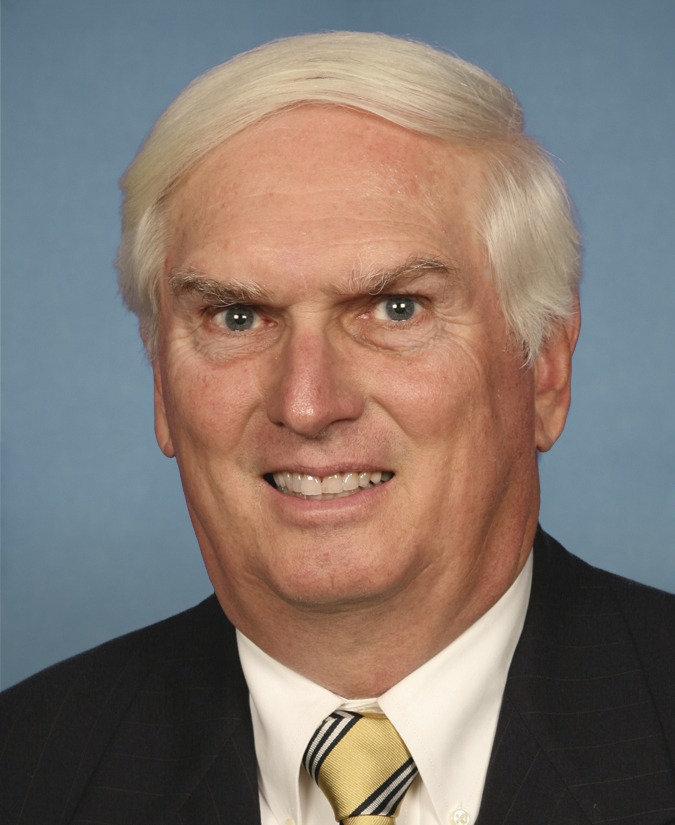

Nominee	Jimmy Duncan	Dave Hancock
Party	Republican	Democratic
Popular vote	141,796	25,400
Percentage	81.78%	14.65%
- County results Duncan: 80–90%
U.S. Representative before election
Jimmy Duncan
Republican
Elected U.S. Representative
Jimmy Duncan
Republican

This district lies in the east central part of the state, based in Knoxville and is largely coextensive with that city's metropolitan area. It had been represented by Republican Jimmy Duncan since November, 1988. The GOP or its predecessors had held the seat continuously since prior to the Civil War. It had been represented by Republican Jimmy Duncan since November 1988. Duncan won re-election in a landslide, carrying every county with over 80% of the vote.

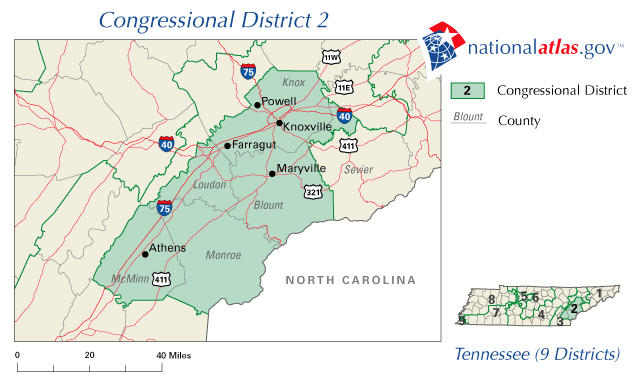

=== Democratic primary ===
- Dave Hancock

Democratic primary results
Party	Candidate	Votes	%
Democratic	Dave Hancock	9,778	100.0
Total votes		9,778	100.0

=== Republican primary ===
- Jimmy Duncan, incumbent

Republican primary results
Party	Candidate	Votes	%
Republican	Jimmy Duncan (incumbent)	92,414	100.0
Total votes		92,414	100.0

=== General election ===
==== Predictions ====
Source	Ranking	As of
The Cook Political Report	Safe R	November 1, 2010
Rothenberg	Safe R	November 1, 2010
Sabato's Crystal Ball	Safe R	November 1, 2010
RCP	Safe R	November 1, 2010
CQ Politics	Safe R	October 28, 2010
New York Times	Safe R	November 1, 2010
FiveThirtyEight	Safe R	November 1, 2010

Tennessee's 2nd congressional district, 2010
Party	Candidate	Votes	%
Republican	Jimmy Duncan (incumbent)	141,796	81.78%
Democratic	Dave Hancock	25,400	14.65%
Independent	Joseph R. Leinweber Jr.	2,497	1.44%
Independent	D.H. "Andy" Andrew	1,993	1.15%
Independent	Greg Samples	1,185	0.68%
Independent	H. James Headings	509	0.30%
Total votes		173,380	100.00%
Republican hold			

- Race ranking and details from CQ Politics
- Campaign contributions from OpenSecrets
- Race profile at The New York Times

== District 3 ==
2010 Tennessee's 3rd congressional district election
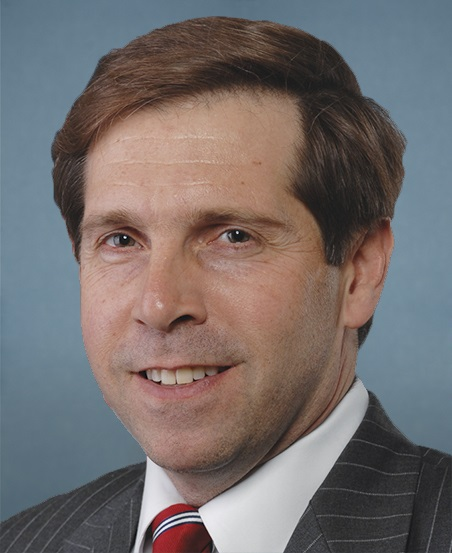

Nominee	Chuck Fleischmann	John Wolfe Jr.	Savas T. Kyriakidis
Party	Republican	Democratic	Independent
Popular vote	92,032	45,387	17,077
Percentage	56.79%	28.01%	10.54%
- County results Fleischmann: 40–50% 50–60% 60–70% 70–80%
U.S. Representative before election
Zach Wamp
Republican
Elected U.S. Representative
Chuck Fleischmann
Republican

This gerrymandered district, which stretches from the Chattanooga metropolitan area in southern Tennessee to Claiborne County in northern Tennessee, is strongly conservative and had been represented by Republican Congressman Zach Wamp since his initial 1994 election. Zach Wamp announced that he would be running for governor in 2010, leaving the third district open.

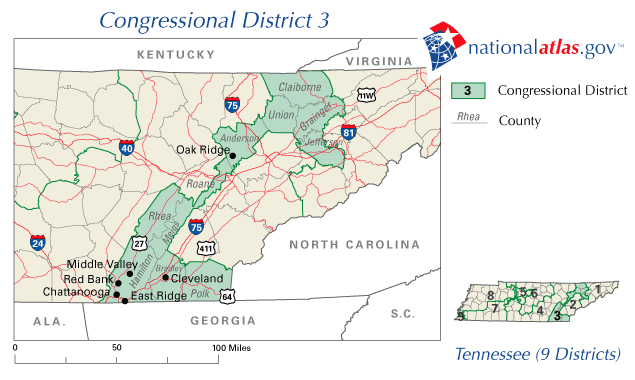

=== Democratic primary ===
- Alicia Mitchell
- Brenda Freeman Short
- Brent Davis Staton
- John Wolfe Jr., attorney and perennial candidate
- Larry J. Abeare Sr (write-in)

Democratic primary results
Party	Candidate	Votes	%
Democratic	John Wolfe Jr.	7,006	38.92%
Democratic	Brenda Freeman Short	4,530	25.17%
Democratic	Brent Davis Staton	4,530	21.19%
Democratic	Alicia Mitchell	2,647	14.71%
Democratic	Larry J. Abeare, Sr. (write-in)	3	0.01%
Total votes		18,000	100.00%

=== Republican primary ===
- Tommy Crangle
- Chuck Fleischmann, attorney
- Tim Gobble
- Harvey Howard
- Jean Howard-Hill
- Van Irion
- Rick Kernea
- Basil Marceaux, perennial candidate
- Art Rhodes
- Robin Smith, former TNGOP Chairwoman
- Grover Travillian

Republican primary results
Party	Candidate	Votes	%
Republican	Chuck Fleischmann	26,869	29.67%
Republican	Robin Smith	25,454	28.11%
Republican	Tim Gobble	14,274	15.76%
Republican	Van Irion	10,492	11.59%
Republican	Tommy Crangle	5,149	5.69%
Republican	Art Rhodes	4,552	5.03%
Republican	Jean Howard-Hill	1,259	1.39%
Republican	Rick Kernea	739	0.82%
Republican	Harvey Howard	670	0.74%
Republican	Basil Marceaux	655	0.72%
Republican	Grover Travillian	440	0.48%
Total votes		90,553	100.00%

=== General election ===
- Race ranking and details from CQ Politics
- Campaign contributions from OpenSecrets
- Race profile at The New York Times

==== Predictions ====
Source	Ranking	As of
The Cook Political Report	Safe R	November 1, 2010
Rothenberg	Safe R	November 1, 2010
Sabato's Crystal Ball	Safe R	November 1, 2010
RCP	Safe R	November 1, 2010
CQ Politics	Safe R	October 28, 2010
New York Times	Safe R	November 1, 2010
FiveThirtyEight	Safe R	November 1, 2010

Tennessee's 3rd congressional district, 2010
Party	Candidate	Votes	%
Republican	Chuck Fleischmann	92,032	56.79%
Democratic	John Wolfe Jr.	45,387	28.01%
Independent	Savas T. Kyriakidis	17,077	10.54%
Independent	Mark DeVol	5,773	3.56%
Independent	Don Barkman	811	0.50%
Independent	Gregory C. Goodwin	380	0.23%
Independent	Robert Humphries	380	0.23%
Independent	Mo Kiah	216	0.14%
Total votes		162,056	100.00%
Republican hold			

== District 4 ==
2010 Tennessee's 4th congressional district election
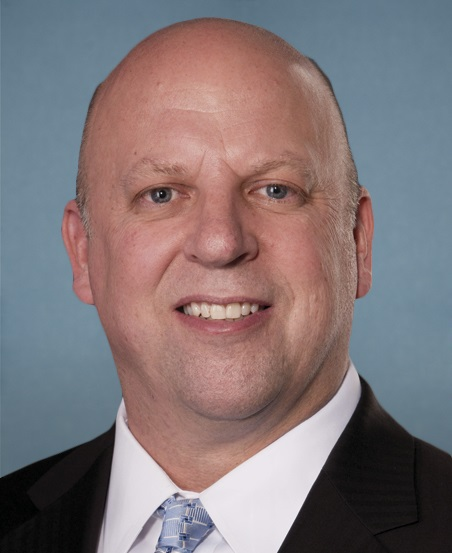

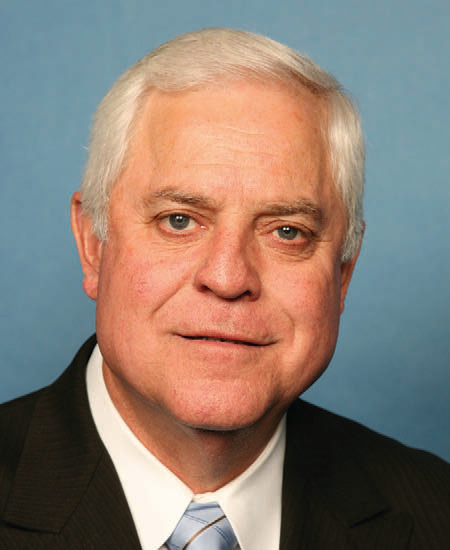
Nominee	Scott DesJarlais	Lincoln Davis
Party	Republican	Democratic
Popular vote	103,969	70,254
Percentage	57.07%	38.56%
- County results DesJarlais: 40–50% 50–60% 60–70% 70–80% Davis: 40–50%
U.S. Representative before election
Lincoln Davis
Democratic
Elected U.S. Representative
Scott DesJarlais
Republican

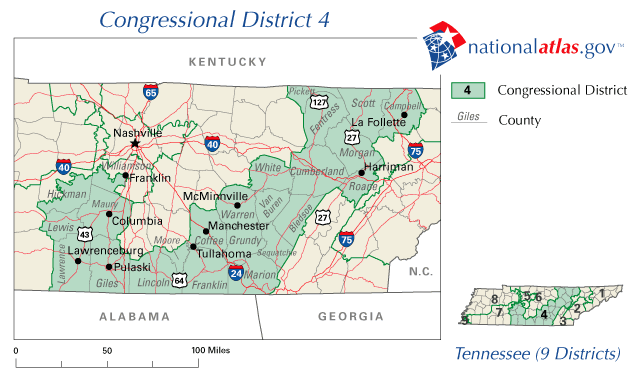

Democratic incumbent Lincoln Davis ran for re-election, challenged by Republican nominee Scott DesJarlais, a physician in Jasper, and Independents Paul H. Curtis (PVS), James

Gray (campaign site, PVS), Richard S. Johnson (PVS), and Gerald York (campaign site, PVS).

Davis had represented the district since 2003. He turned down a run for governor, deciding to run for re-election instead.

This district lies in Middle and East Tennessee.

Scott DesJarlais (R) won the election.

=== Democratic primary ===
- Lincoln Davis

Democratic primary results
Party	Candidate	Votes	%
Democratic	Lincoln Davis	41,573	100.0%
Total votes		41,573	100.0%

=== Republican primary ===
- Scott DesJarlais
- Jack Bailey
- Kent Greenough
- Ronald L. Harwell
- Donald "Don" Strong

Republican primary results
Party	Candidate	Votes	%
Republican	Scott DesJarlais	27,812	37.2%
Republican	Jack Bailey	20,420	27.3%
Republican	Kent Greenough	11,413	15.2%
Republican	Ronald L. Harwell	9,237	12.3%
Republican	Donald "Don" Strong	5,992	8.0%
Total votes		74,874	100.0%

=== General election ===
- Race ranking and details from CQ Politics
- Campaign contributions from OpenSecrets
- Race profile at The New York Times

==== Predictions ====
Source	Ranking	As of
The Cook Political Report	Tossup	November 1, 2010
Rothenberg	Tilt R (flip)	November 1, 2010
Sabato's Crystal Ball	Lean R (flip)	November 1, 2010
RCP	Tossup	November 1, 2010
CQ Politics	Tossup	October 28, 2010
New York Times	Tossup	November 1, 2010
FiveThirtyEight	Lean R (flip)	November 1, 2010

Tennessee's 4th congressional district, 2010
Party	Candidate	Votes	%
Republican	Scott DesJarlais	103,969	57.07%
Democratic	Lincoln Davis (incumbent)	70,254	38.56%
Independent	Others	7,968	4.37%
Total votes		182,191	100.00%
Republican gain from Democratic			

== District 5 ==
2010 Tennessee's 5th congressional district election
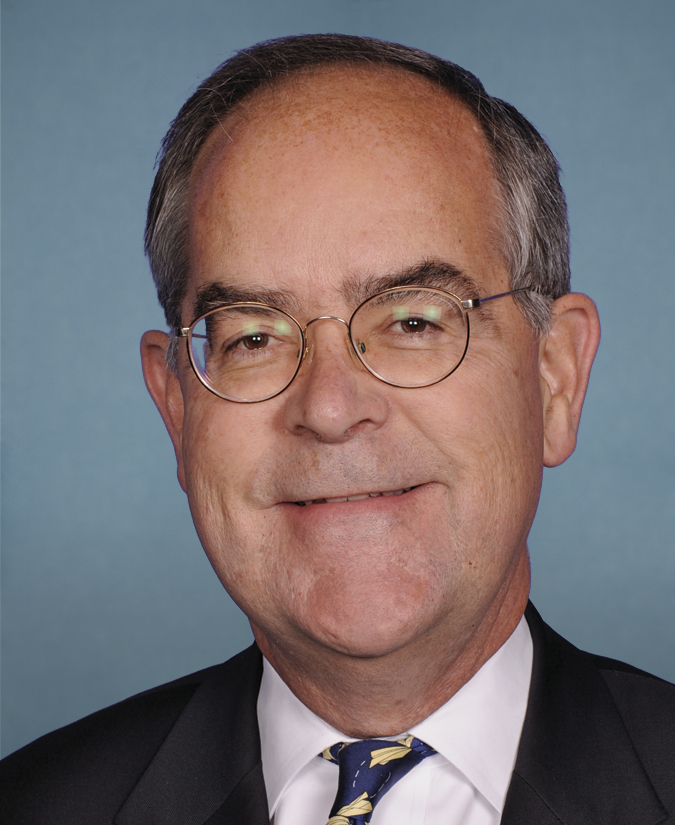

Nominee	Jim Cooper	David Hall
Party	Democratic	Republican
Popular vote	99,162	74,204
Percentage	56.23%	42.07%
- County results Cooper: 60–70% Hall: 60–70%
U.S. Representative before election
Jim Cooper
Democratic
Elected U.S. Representative
Jim Cooper
Democratic

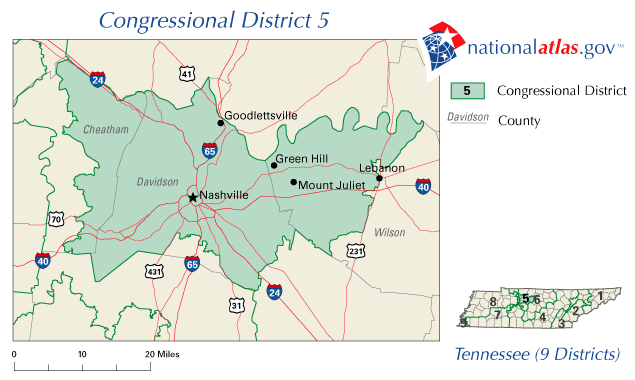

Tennessee’s 5th congressional district was centered on Nashville and included portions of the surrounding area. The district was anchored by the majority of Nashville–Davidson County, making Nashville its largest city and primary population center. In addition to Nashville, the district extended into parts of Cheatham County and Wilson County. This included communities such as Ashland City, Pleasant View, and Pegram in Cheatham County, as well as most of Lebanon, as well as Mount Juliet, and Green Hill in Wilson County. It had been represented by Democrat Jim Cooper since 2003.

Jim Cooper (D) won re-election with 56.2% of the vote. This election was Cooper's closest congressional race.

=== Democratic primary ===
- Jim Cooper
- Eric Pearson
- Eric Schechter

Democratic primary results
Party	Candidate	Votes	%
Democratic	Jim Cooper	28,660	89.3%
Democratic	Eric Pearson	2,214	6.9%
Democratic	Eric Schechter	1,213	3.8%
Total votes		32,087	100.0%

=== Republican primary ===
- David Hall
- Jeffery Alan Hartline
- CeCe Heil
- Vijay Kumar
- Patrick Miranda
- Jarod D. Scott
- Lonnie Spivak
- Alvin M. Strauss
- Bob Ries
- Bob Schwartz
- Tracy C. Tarum

Republican primary results
Party	Candidate	Votes	%
Republican	David Hall	11,933	27.5%
Republican	Jeffery Alan Hartline	10,009	23.1%
Republican	CeCe Heil	9,767	22.5%
Republican	Vijay Kumar	3,158	7.3%
Republican	Lonnie Spivak	2,375	5.5%
Republican	Bob Ries	1,530	3.5%
Republican	Alvin M. Strauss	1,385	3.2%
Republican	Tracy C. Tarum	1,129	2.6%
Republican	Patrick Miranda	1,212	2.8%
Republican	Jarod D. Scott	562	1.3%
Republican	Bob Schwartz	319	0.7%
Total votes		43,379	100.0%

=== General election ===
- Race ranking and details from CQ Politics
- Campaign contributions from OpenSecrets
- Race profile at The New York Times

==== Predictions ====
Source	Ranking	As of
The Cook Political Report	Likely D	November 1, 2010
Rothenberg	Safe D	November 1, 2010
Sabato's Crystal Ball	Safe D	November 1, 2010
RCP	Likely D	November 1, 2010
CQ Politics	Safe D	October 28, 2010
New York Times	Safe D	November 1, 2010
FiveThirtyEight	Safe D	November 1, 2010

Tennessee's 5th congressional district, 2010
Party	Candidate	Votes	%
Democratic	Jim Cooper (incumbent)	99,162	56.23%
Republican	David Hall	74,204	42.07%
Independent	Others	2,996	1.70%
Total votes		176,362	100.00%
Democratic hold			

== District 6 ==
2010 Tennessee's 6th congressional district election
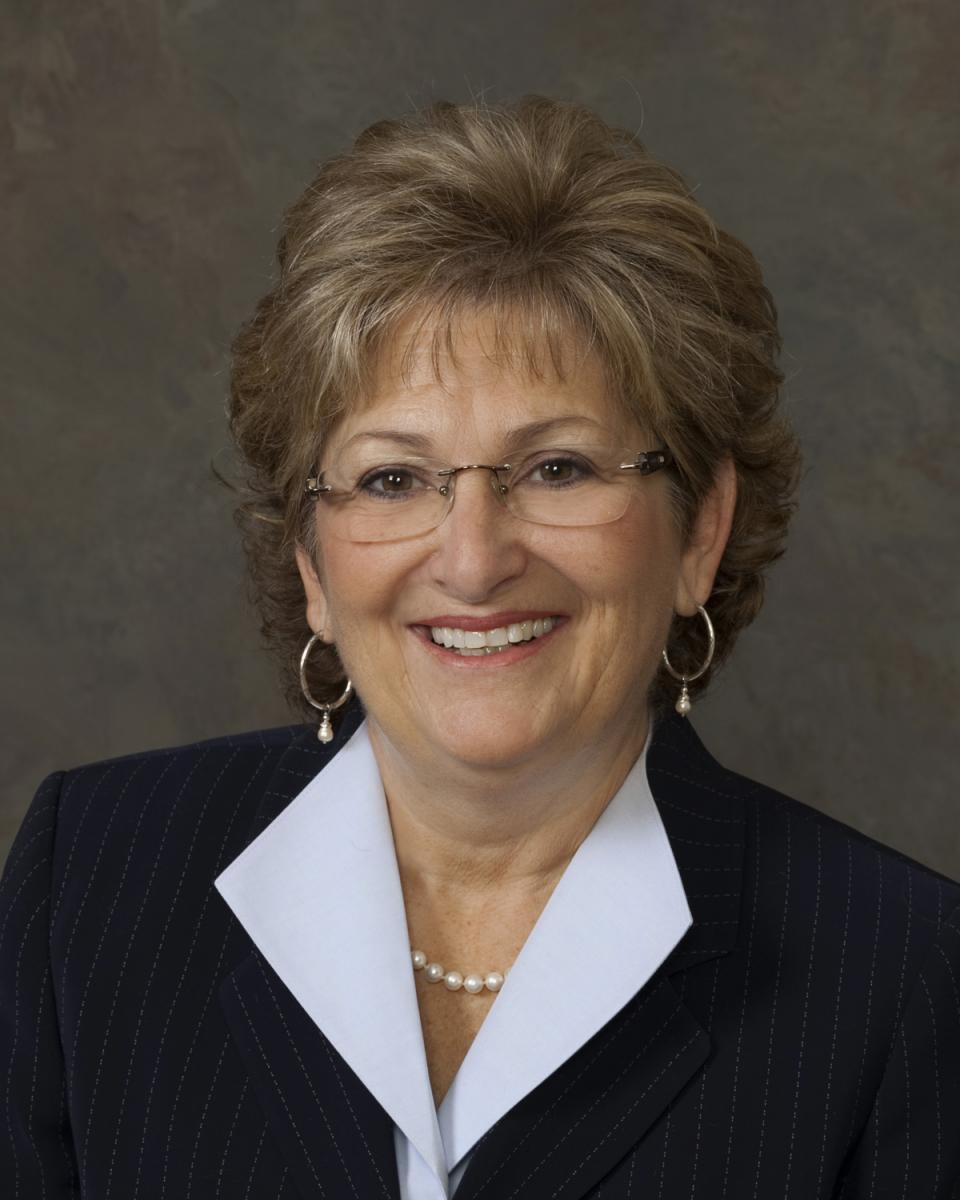

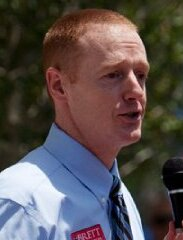
Nominee	Diane Black	Brett Carter
Party	Republican	Democratic
Popular vote	128,517	56,145
Percentage	67.26%	29.38%
- County results Black: 50–60% 60–70% 70–80%
U.S. Representative before election
Bart Gordon
Democratic
Elected U.S. Representative
Diane Black
Republican

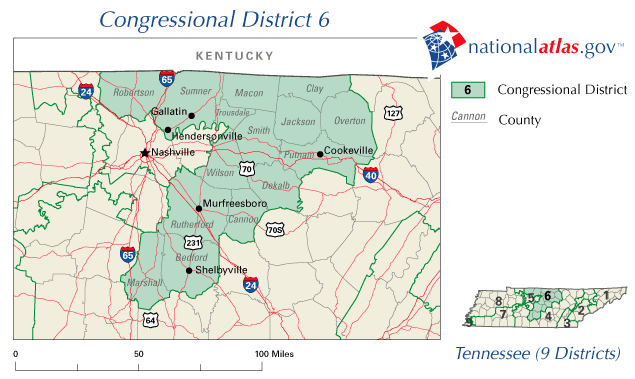

This district lies in Middle Tennessee, including all of Bedford, Cannon, Clay, DeKalb, Jackson, Macon, Marshall, Overton, Putnam, Robertson, Rutherford, Smith, Sumner, and Trousdale Counties, as well as a portion of Wilson County. It had been represented by Democrat Bart Gordon since 1985. Gordon announced on December 14, 2009, that he would not be seeking another term, leaving the sixth district open.

State Senator Jim Tracy, State Senator Diane Black, Rutherford County Republican Chairwoman Lou Ann Zelenik, United States Army Reserve Major General Dave Evans, realtor Gary Mann, and businessman Kerry Roberts ran for the Republican nomination. Democratic candidates included lawyer and Iraq veteran Brett Carter, aviation safety inspector George Erdel, ex-marine Ben Leming, Henry Barry, and Devora Butler.

The nominees were Brett Carter (D) and Diane Black (R).

Diane Black (R) won the election.

=== Democratic primary ===
- Henry Clay Barry
- Devora E. Butler
- Brett Carter
- George T. Erdel
- Ben Leming
- Write-in - Floyd R. Conover
- Write-in - Martin L.C. Kelly, Jr.

Democratic primary results
Party	Candidate	Votes	%
Democratic	Brett Carter	9,430	30.3%
Democratic	Ben Leming	9,208	29.6%
Democratic	Henry Clay Barry	8,917	28.6%
Democratic	Devora E. Butler	2,777	8.9%
Democratic	George T. Erdel	817	2.6%
Democratic	Floyd R. Conover	0	0.0%
Democratic	Martin L.C. Kelly, Jr.	0	0.0%
Total votes		31,149	100.0%

=== Republican primary ===
- Diane Black
- Dave Evans
- Gary Dewitt Mann
- Bruce McLellan
- Kerry E. Roberts
- Jim Tracy
- Lou Ann Zelenik

Republican primary results
Party	Candidate	Votes	%
Republican	Diane Black	24,374	30.5%
Republican	Lou Ann Zelenik	24,091	30.2%
Republican	Jim Tracy	23,808	29.8%
Republican	Dave Evans	3,974	5.0%
Republican	Kerry E. Roberts	2,482	3.1%
Republican	Bruce McLellan	695	0.9%
Republican	Gary Dewitt Mann	465	0.6%
Total votes		76,889	100.0%

=== General election ===
- Race ranking and details from CQ Politics
- Campaign contributions from OpenSecrets
- Race profile at The New York Times

==== Predictions ====
Source	Ranking	As of
The Cook Political Report	Likely R (flip)	November 1, 2010
Rothenberg	Likely R (flip)	November 1, 2010
Sabato's Crystal Ball	Likely R (flip)	November 1, 2010
RCP	Likely R (flip)	November 1, 2010
CQ Politics	Safe R (flip)	October 28, 2010
New York Times	Safe R (flip)	November 1, 2010
FiveThirtyEight	Safe R (flip)	November 1, 2010

Tennessee's 6th congressional district, 2010
Party	Candidate	Votes	%
Republican	Diane Black	128,517	67.26%
Democratic	Brett Carter	56,145	29.38%
Independent	Others	6,422	3.36%
Total votes		191,084	100.00%
Republican gain from Democratic			

== District 7 ==
2010 Tennessee's 7th congressional district election
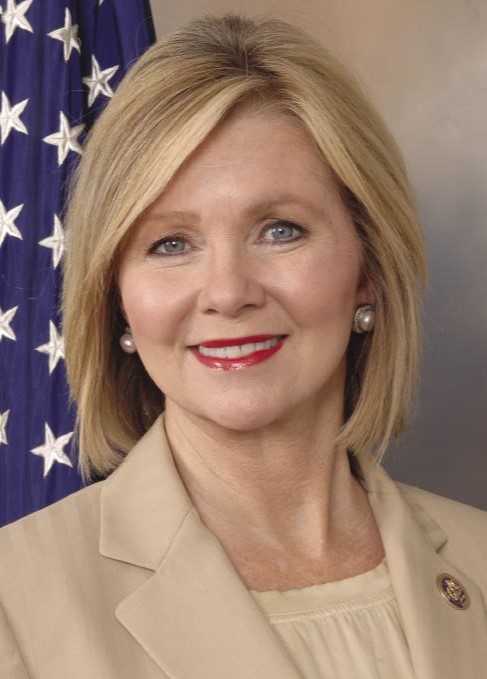

Nominee	Marsha Blackburn	Greg Rabidoux
Party	Republican	Democratic
Popular vote	158,916	54,347
Percentage	72.37%	24.75%
- County results Blackburn: 50–60% 60–70% 70–80%
U.S. Representative before election
Marsha Blackburn
Republican
Elected U.S. Representative
Marsha Blackburn
Republican

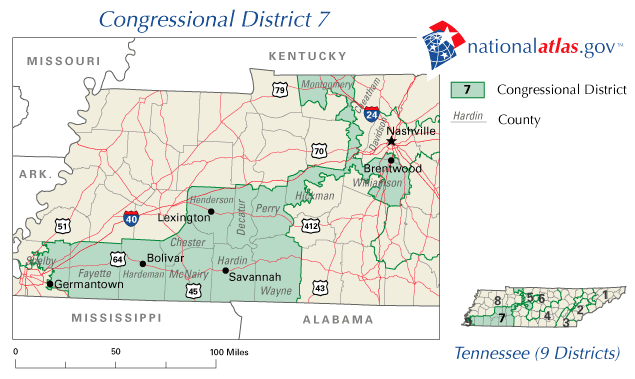

Tennessee’s 7th congressional district stretched from portions of Shelby County in West Tennessee through parts of Middle Tennessee which included the majority of Williamson County and a part of southern suburban Nashville and northward to include Clarksville in Montgomery County, resulting in an unusually long and narrow configuration that combined distant suburban and rural areas into a single congressional district. It had been represented by Republican Marsha Blackburn since 2003. She faced a challenge from Austin Peay University professor and Democrat Dr. Greg Rabidoux.

Marsha Blackburn (R) won re-election.

=== Democratic primary ===
- Greg Rabidoux

Democratic primary results
Party	Candidate	Votes	%
Democratic	Greg Rabidoux	23,235	100.0%
Total votes		23,235	100.0%

=== Republican primary ===
- Marsha Blackburn

Republican primary results
Party	Candidate	Votes	%
Republican	Marsha Blackburn	97,088	100.0%
Total votes		97,088	100.0%

=== General election ===
- Race ranking and details from CQ Politics
- Campaign contributions from OpenSecrets
- Race profile at The New York Times

==== Predictions ====
Source	Ranking	As of
The Cook Political Report	Safe R	November 1, 2010
Rothenberg	Safe R	November 1, 2010
Sabato's Crystal Ball	Safe R	November 1, 2010
RCP	Safe R	November 1, 2010
CQ Politics	Safe R	October 28, 2010
New York Times	Safe R	November 1, 2010
FiveThirtyEight	Safe R	November 1, 2010

Tennessee's 1st congressional district, 2010
Party	Candidate	Votes	%
Republican	Marsha Blackburn (incumbent)	158,916	72.37%
Democratic	Greg Rabidoux	54,347	24.75%
Independent	J. W. (Bill) Stone	6,320	2.88%
Total votes		219,583	100.00%
Republican hold			

== District 8 ==
2010 Tennessee's 8th congressional district election
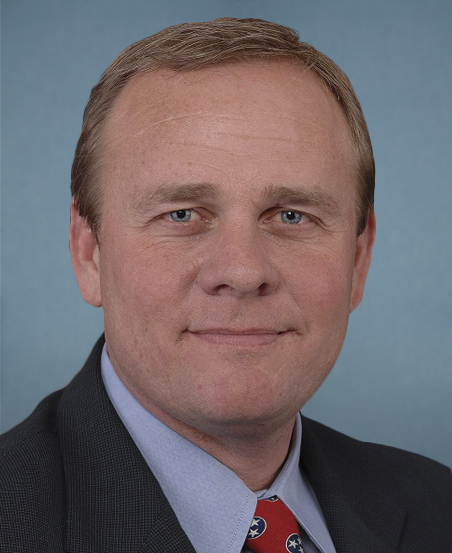

Nominee	Stephen Fincher	Roy Herron
Party	Republican	Democratic
Popular vote	98,759	64,960
Percentage	58.99%	38.80%
- County results Fincher: 50–60% 60–70% 70–80% Herron: 40–50% 50–60% 60–70%
U.S. Representative before election
John Tanner
Democratic
Elected U.S. Representative
Stephen Fincher
Republican

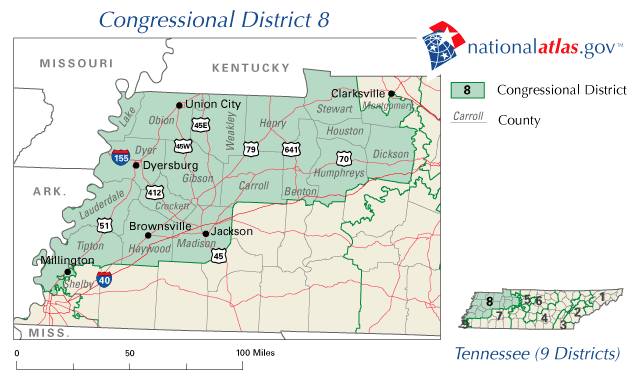

Democratic incumbent John Tanner, who had represented the district since 1989, announced his retirement in December 2009 leaving the eighth district open.

Stephen Fincher was the Republican nominee, and State Senator Roy Herron was the Democratic nominee. Also on the ballot are Tea Party candidate Donn Janes (campaign site, PVS), who earlier dropped out of the Republican primary, and Independent Mark J. Rawles (campaign site, PVS).

This district covers roughly the northwestern part of the state.

Stephen Fincher (R) won the election.

=== Democratic primary ===
- Roy Herron
- Kimberlee E. Smith

Democratic primary results
Party	Candidate	Votes	%
Democratic	Roy Herron	27,139	67.7%
Democratic	Kimberlee E. Smith	12,971	32.3%
Total votes		40,110	100.0%

=== Republican primary ===
Stephen Fincher comfortably secured the Republican nominee receiving 48.5% of the vote against his main appointments George Flynn and Ron Kirkland.

James L. Hart, who had previously attempted to run in 2006 and 2008 and ran in 2004, attempted to run again. Republican state leadership successfully petitioned to have him removed from the ballot on the grounds that he was not a bona fide member of the party. Hart's attorney when he first challenged to remain on the ballot in 2006 was Richard Barrett, the Mississippi white nationalist leader. Heart ended up having a write-In campaign where he only received 4 votes in the Republican primary and 5 votes in the general election.

==== Candidates ====
- Stephen Fincher
- George Flinn
- Ron Kirkland
- Randy Smith
- Ben Watts
- Write-In – James L. Hart, a white supremacist, segregationist activist and political candidate in Buchanan, Tennessee

Republican primary results
Party	Candidate	Votes	%
Republican	Stephen Lee Fincher	35,024	48.5%
Republican	Ron Kirkland	17,637	24.4%
Republican	George Flinn	17,308	24.0%
Republican	Randy Smith	1,546	2.1%
Republican	Ben Watts	720	1.0%
Republican	Write-In – James Hart	4	0.0%
Total votes		72,239	100.0%

=== General election ===
- Race ranking and details from CQ Politics
- Campaign contributions from OpenSecrets
- Race profile at The New York Times

==== Endorsements ====
Herron had been endorsed by the state's two largest newspapers, the Memphis Commercial Appeal and the Nashville Tennessean.

Fincher had been endorsed by former Governor Winfield Dunn, Citizens United, Eagle Forum, Family Research Council, Concerned Women for America, and State Senator Dolores Gresham.

==== Predictions ====
Source	Ranking	As of
The Cook Political Report	Likely R (flip)	November 1, 2010
Rothenberg	Likely R (flip)	November 1, 2010
Sabato's Crystal Ball	Likely R (flip)	November 1, 2010
RCP	Likely R (flip)	November 1, 2010
CQ Politics	Likely R (flip)	October 28, 2010
New York Times	Safe R (flip)	November 1, 2010
FiveThirtyEight	Safe R (flip)	November 1, 2010

==== Polling ====
Poll Source	Dates Administered	Stephen Fincher (R)	Roy Herron (D)	Donn Janes (I)	Undecided
Memphisnewsblog.com	August 10–11, 2010	47%	37%	5%	11%

2010 Tennessee's 8th congressional district election
Party	Candidate	Votes	%
Republican	Steve Fincher	98,759	58.99%
Democratic	Roy Herron	64,960	38.80%
Independent	Others	3,686	2.20%
Total votes		167,405	100.00%
Republican gain from Democratic			

==== By county ====
County	Stephen Fincher Republican		Roy Herron Democratic		Other votes	
County	%	#	%	#	%	#
Benton	50.79%	2,525	47.74%	2,373	1.47%	73
Carroll	64.70%	5,258	34.60%	2,856	1.70%	140
Crockett	77.24%	3,360	21.75%	946	1.01%	44
Dickson	77.24%	7,512	21.75%	3,959	1.01%	316
Gibson	63.99%	9,230	33.80%	4,875	2.22%	320
Haywood	47.69%	2,524	51.16%	2,708	1.15%	61
Henry	58.54%	5,460	39.55%	3,689	1.91%	178
Houston	48.01%	991	49.66%	1,025	2.33%	48
Humphreys	52.23%	2,536	45.11%	2,190	2.66%	129
Lake	47.55%	651	51.13%	700	1.31%	18
Lauderdale	60.63%	3,611	37.98%	2,262	1.39%	83
Madison	57.11%	15,939	40.74%	11,372	2.15%	600
Montgomery	57.32%	4,120	39.29%	2,824	3.39%	244
Obion	58.15%	5,363	40.40%	3,726	1.45%	134
Shelby	35.85%	4,468	62.16%	7,747	1.98%	247
Stewart	52.99%	1,967	44.32%	1,645	2.69%	100
Tipton	69.65%	10,628	26.15%	3,991	4.20%	641
Weakley	59.75%	5,575	38.73%	3,614	1.52%	142

== District 9 ==
2010 Tennessee's 9th congressional district election
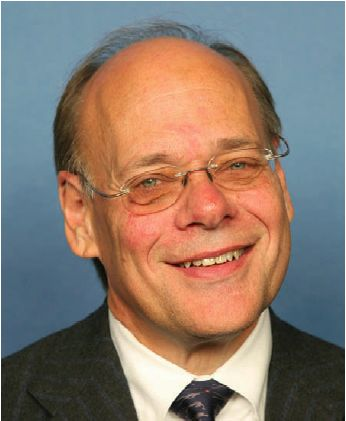

Nominee	Steve Cohen	Charlotte Bergmann
Party	Democratic	Republican
Popular vote	99,827	33,879
Percentage	74.00%	25.11%
- County results Cohen: 70–80%
U.S. Representative before election
Steve Cohen
Democratic
Elected U.S. Representative
Steve Cohen
Democratic

This district lies in southwestern Tennessee, located entirely within Shelby County and including most of the city of Memphis. It had been represented by Democrat Steve Cohen since 2007. The Republicans nominated Charlotte Bergmann, who owns a Memphis-based marketing firm, Effective PMP, LLC. Steve Cohen won re-election with 74% of the vote.

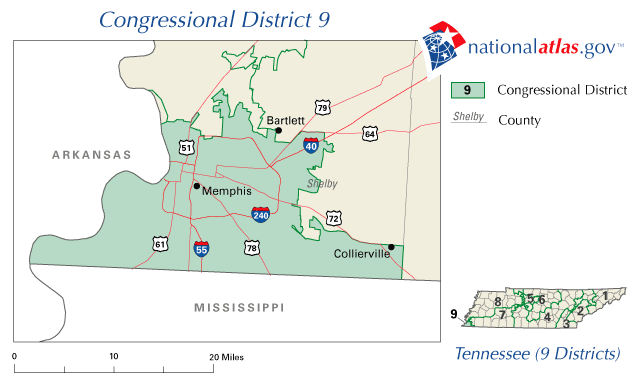

=== Democratic primary ===
Incumbent U.S. Representative Steve Cohen faced a high‑profile challenge from former Memphis Mayor Willie Herenton, who sought to make the race a referendum on racial representation in Congress. Herenton, the first elected African‑American mayor of Memphis, campaigned on the contention that Tennessee’s all‑white congressional delegation needed "just one" African‑American member, using the slogan "Just One" to highlight this theme. Herenton’s campaign frequently emphasized Cohen’s race and representation in the majority‑Black district, drawing national attention and sparking debate about racial dynamics in local politics. Despite these appeals, Cohen, who had strong endorsements including from President Barack Obama, won a commanding victory with approximately 79% of the vote to Herenton's 21%.

Democratic primary
Primary election
Party	Candidate	Votes	%
Democratic	Steve Cohen (incumbent)	63,402	78.71%
Democratic	Willie Herenton	17,153	21.29%
Total votes		80,555	100.00%

=== Republican primary ===
- Charlotte Bergmann
- Jim Harrell
- Kevin Millen

Republican primary results
Party	Candidate	Votes	%
Republican	Charlotte Bergmann	13,295	61.4%
Republican	Jim Harrell	7,165	33.1%
Republican	Kevin Millen	1,199	5.5%
Total votes		21,659	100.0%

=== General election ===
- Race ranking and details from CQ Politics
- Campaign contributions from OpenSecrets
- Race profile at The New York Times

==== Predictions ====
Source	Ranking	As of
The Cook Political Report	Safe D	November 1, 2010
Rothenberg	Safe D	November 1, 2010
Sabato's Crystal Ball	Safe D	November 1, 2010
RCP	Safe D	November 1, 2010
CQ Politics	Safe D	October 28, 2010
New York Times	Safe D	November 1, 2010
FiveThirtyEight	Safe D	November 1, 2010

Tennessee's 5th congressional district, 2010
Party	Candidate	Votes	%
Democratic	Steve Cohen (incumbent)	99,827	74.00%
Republican	Charlotte Bergmann	33,879	25.11%
Independent	Others	1,201	0.89%
Total votes		134,907	100.00%
Democratic hold			

== See also ==
- 2010 Tennessee elections
- 2010 United States elections
