= The Chattanoogan =

Online news outlet in Chattanooga, Tennessee, United States

- Chattanooga's Source for Local Breaking News
- Editor: Marcy Bryant, Jenny Gienapp, Jana Hinton
- Founded: September 1, 1999
- Website: www.chattanoogan.com

The Chattanoogan and its website Chattanoogan.com is an online media outlet that concentrates on news from Chattanooga, Tennessee. It is published by John Wilson, who previously wrote for the Chattanooga Free Press. The website was launched on September 1, 1999, and calls itself "one of the first full-service web-only daily newspapers in the country".
