= Eric Stewart (politician) =

American politician (born 1971)

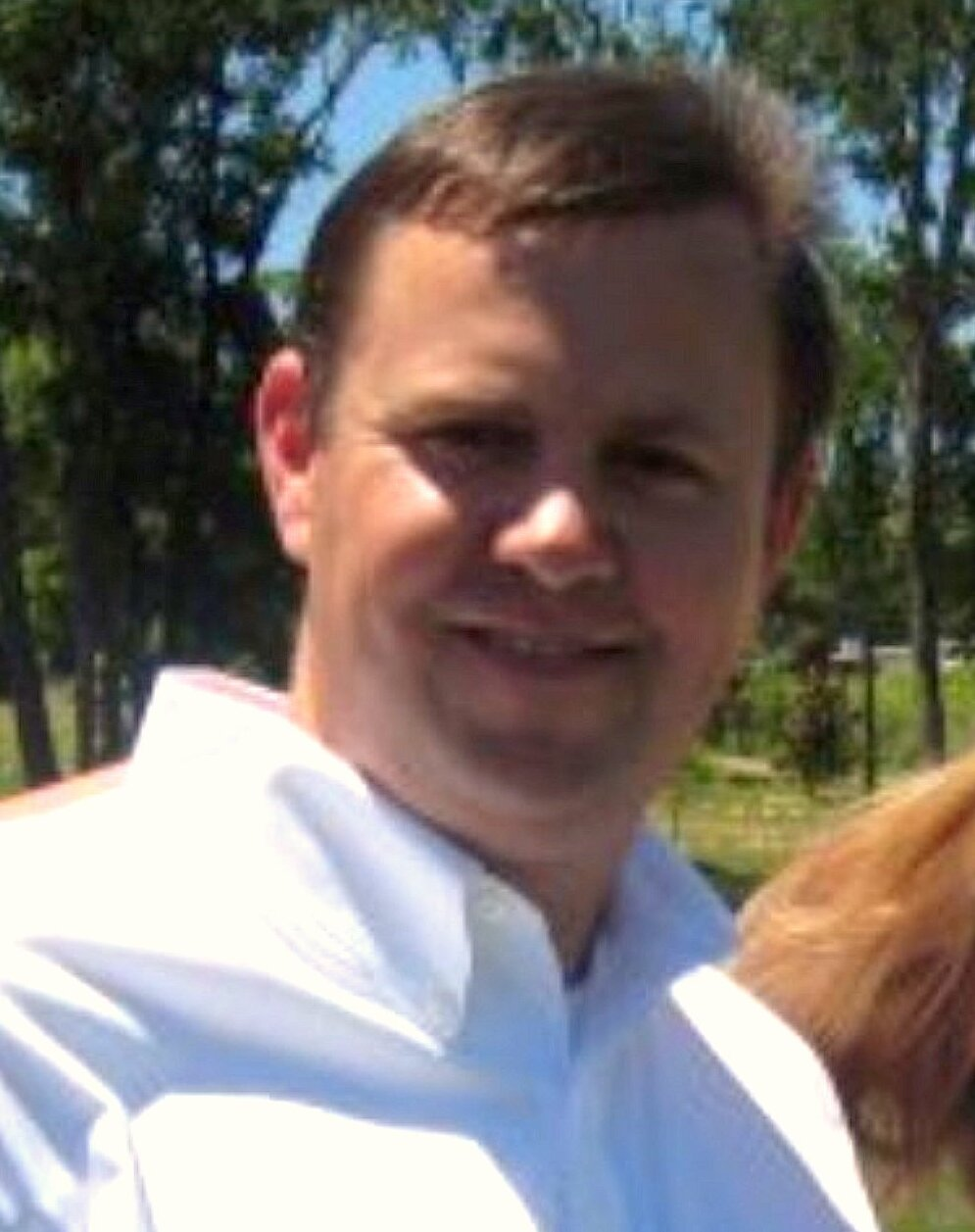

Member of the Tennessee Senate from the 14th district
- In office 2008–2012
- Preceded by: Steve Roller
- Succeeded by: Janice Bowling

Personal details
- Born: December 6, 1971 (age 54) Franklin County, Tennessee, U.S.
- Party: Democratic
- Spouse: Judy Holt
- Education: Austin Peay State University
- Occupation: insurance, construction

Eric Stewart (born December 6, 1971) is an American politician from Tennessee, who represented the 14th district as State Senator from 2008 to 2012. His district included all or parts of Bledsoe, Coffee, Franklin, Grundy, Sequatchie, Van Buren and Warren counties.

== Political career ==
Prior to his election to the State Senate, Stewart served as a Franklin County commissioner. After redistricting in 2012, his district was renumbered District 16 and lost Bledsoe County but added Marion. He opted to not run for re-election in 2012 in the newly drawn district and instead mounted an unsuccessful run in Tennessee's 4th congressional district, which includes almost all of his state senate district. He lost to Republican incumbent Scott DesJarlais.

Stewart founded his own insurance agency, Eric Stewart Insurance, in Fayetteville in 1999. The agency currently operates as The Stewart Insurance Agency in Winchester, Tennessee.

=== 2012 Congressional campaign ===
On November 17, 2011, Stewart announced his candidacy for Tennessee's 4th congressional district seat in the U.S. House of Representatives. He won the Democratic primary election and lost to incumbent Republican Scott DesJarlais in the general election.
