= James L. Hart =

American politician (born 1944)

James Lee Hart (also known as John Hart, born February 23, 1944) is a white supremacist, segregationist activist and political candidate in Buchanan, Tennessee.

== Beliefs ==
Hart describes himself as an advocate of eugenics, saying that the United States should be repopulated with members of the "favored races" of Europe and Asia and not the "less-favored races" of Africa. Without such an ethnic cleansing, he argues, "we are now in danger of degenerating back to the level of the subhuman primate once again." In a campaign brochure, he wrote: "We whites don’t hold minorities back. The minorities hold us back and destroy the civilizations that we create whether in Zimbabwe or Detroit."

Hart has cited the suicide of his 29-year-old son in 2001 as motivation for his political efforts.

== Political campaigns ==
Hart ran for Congress in 2002 as an independent, winning 2.55% of the vote. But he first gained notice in 2004 when he ran as a Republican for the House of Representatives for Tennessee's Eighth District. As the only candidate on the primary ballot (facing only a write-in campaign), he won the Republican nomination, despite listing an out-of-state address in candidate filings. The state Republican Party disavowed his candidacy, describing his views on race as "abhorrent and outrageous" and urging "all Republicans and Tennesseans to reject the candidacy of James Hart wholly and unequivocally." Hart lost to incumbent Democrat John Tanner, receiving 25.6% of the vote.

He attempted to run again in 2006, but Republican state leadership successfully petitioned to have him removed from the ballot on the grounds that he was not a bona fide member of the party. Hart's attorney in the matter was Richard Barrett, the Mississippi white nationalist leader. He made further attempts in 2008 and 2010, but Republican state leaders were again successful in keeping him off the G.O.P. ballot, pushing him to run as an independent.

He has continued to seek the 8th District seat; in 2022, running as an independent on behalf of "the blue-collar white working man," he received 2,541 votes, 1.2% of all votes cast. He has also been an independent candidate in elections for the Tennessee House of Representatives at least six times.

He ran again in 2024.
