= 2016 United States House of Representatives elections in Tennessee =

- November 8, 2016

All 9 Tennessee seats to the United States House of Representatives
- Turnout: 61.92% ▲24.95 pp
	Majority party	Minority party
Party	Republican	Democratic
Last election	7	2
Seats won	7	2
Seat change	Steady	Steady
Popular vote	1,493,740	814,181
Percentage	62.47%	34.05%
Swing	▲0.56%	▲1.35%

Republican
50–60%
60–70%
70–80%
80–90%
Democratic
40–50%
60–70%
70–80%

The 2016 United States House of Representatives elections in Tennessee was held on November 8, 2016, to elect the nine U.S. representatives from the state of Tennessee, one from each of the state's nine congressional districts. The elections coincided with the elections of other federal and state offices, including President of the United States. The primaries were held on August 4.

Following the 2016 elections, no seats changed hands, leaving the Tennessee delegation at a 7-2 Republican majority.

== Overview ==
Party	Votes	Percentage	Seats Before	Seats After	+/–
Republican	1,493,740	62.47%	7	7	Steady
Democratic	814,181	34.05%	2	2	Steady
Independents	83,134	3.48%	0	0	Steady
Write-Ins	6	0.00	0	0	Steady
Totals	2,391,061	100.00%	9	9	0

Popular vote
Republican	62.47%
Democratic	34.05%
Other	3.48%

House seats
Republican	77.78%
Democratic	22.22%

=== By district ===
Results of the 2016 United States House of Representatives elections in Tennessee by district:

District	Republican		Democratic		Others		Total		Result
District	Votes	%	Votes	%	Votes	%	Votes	%	Result
District 1	198,293	78.37%	39,024	15.42%	15,708	6.21%	253,025	100.0%	Republican hold
District 2	212,455	75.65%	68,401	24.35%	0	0.00%	280,856	100.0%	Republican hold
District 3	176,613	66.39%	76,727	28.84%	12,666	4.76%	266,006	100.0%	Republican hold
District 4	165,796	65.03%	89,141	34.97%	0	0.00%	254,937	100.0%	Republican hold
District 5	102,433	37.45%	171,111	62.55%	0	0.00%	273,544	100.0%	Democratic hold
District 6	202,234	71.09%	61,995	21.79%	20,261	7.12%	284,490	100.0%	Republican hold
District 7	200,407	72.22%	65,226	23.50%	11,880	4.28%	277,513	100.0%	Republican hold
District 8	194,386	68.75%	70,925	25.09%	17,422	6.16%	282,733	100.0%	Republican hold
District 9	41,123	18.87%	171,631	78.75%	5,203	2.39%	217,957	100.0%	Democratic hold
Total	1,493,740	62.47%	814,181	34.05%	83,140	3.48%	2,391,061	100.0%	

== District 1 ==
2016 Tennessee's 1st congressional district election
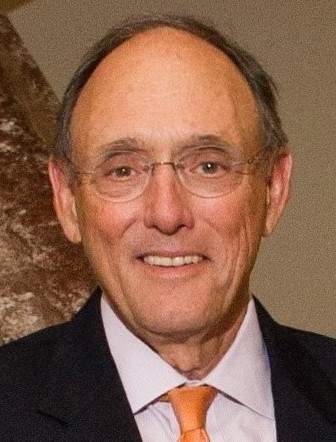

Nominee	Phil Roe	Alan Bohms	Robert Franklin
Party	Republican	Democratic	Independent
Popular vote	198,293	39,024	15,702
Percentage	78.4%	15.4%	6.2%
- County results Roe: 70–80% 80–90%
U.S. Representative before election
Phil Roe
Republican
Elected U.S. Representative
Phil Roe
Republican

Incumbent Republican Phil Roe, who had represented the district since 2009, ran for re-election. He was re-elected with 83% of the vote in 2014. The district had a PVI of R+25.

=== Republican primary ===
==== Candidates ====
===== Nominee =====
- Phil Roe, incumbent U.S. Representative

===== Eliminated in primary =====
- Clint Tribble, conservative activist and YouTube personality

==== Endorsements ====
Phil Roe

Newspapers

- Knoxville News Sentinel

==== Results ====
Republican primary results
Party	Candidate	Votes	%
Republican	Phil Roe (incumbent)	35,350	82.2
Republican	Clint Tribble	7,673	17.8
Total votes		43,023	100.0

=== Democratic primary ===
==== Candidates ====
===== Nominee =====
- Alan Bohms, executive director of the Volunteer Firefighter Alliance

==== Results ====
Democratic primary results
Party	Candidate	Votes	%
Democratic	Alan Bohms	4,161	100.0

=== Independent Candidates ===
- Robert Franklin, U.S. Navy veteran
- Paul Krane (write-in), student

=== General election ===
==== Endorsements ====
Phil Roe (R)

Newspapers

- Knoxville News Sentinel

==== Predictions ====
Source	Ranking	As of
The Cook Political Report	Safe R	November 7, 2016
Daily Kos Elections	Safe R	November 7, 2016
Rothenberg	Safe R	November 3, 2016
Sabato's Crystal Ball	Safe R	November 7, 2016
RCP	Safe R	October 31, 2016

==== Results ====
Tennessee's 1st congressional district, 2016
Party	Candidate	Votes	%
Republican	Phil Roe (incumbent)	198,293	78.4
Democratic	Alan Bohms	39,024	15.4
Independent	Robert Franklin	15,702	6.2
Independent	Paul Krane (write-in)	6	0.0
Total votes		253,025	100.0
Republican hold			

== District 2 ==
2016 Tennessee's 2nd congressional district election
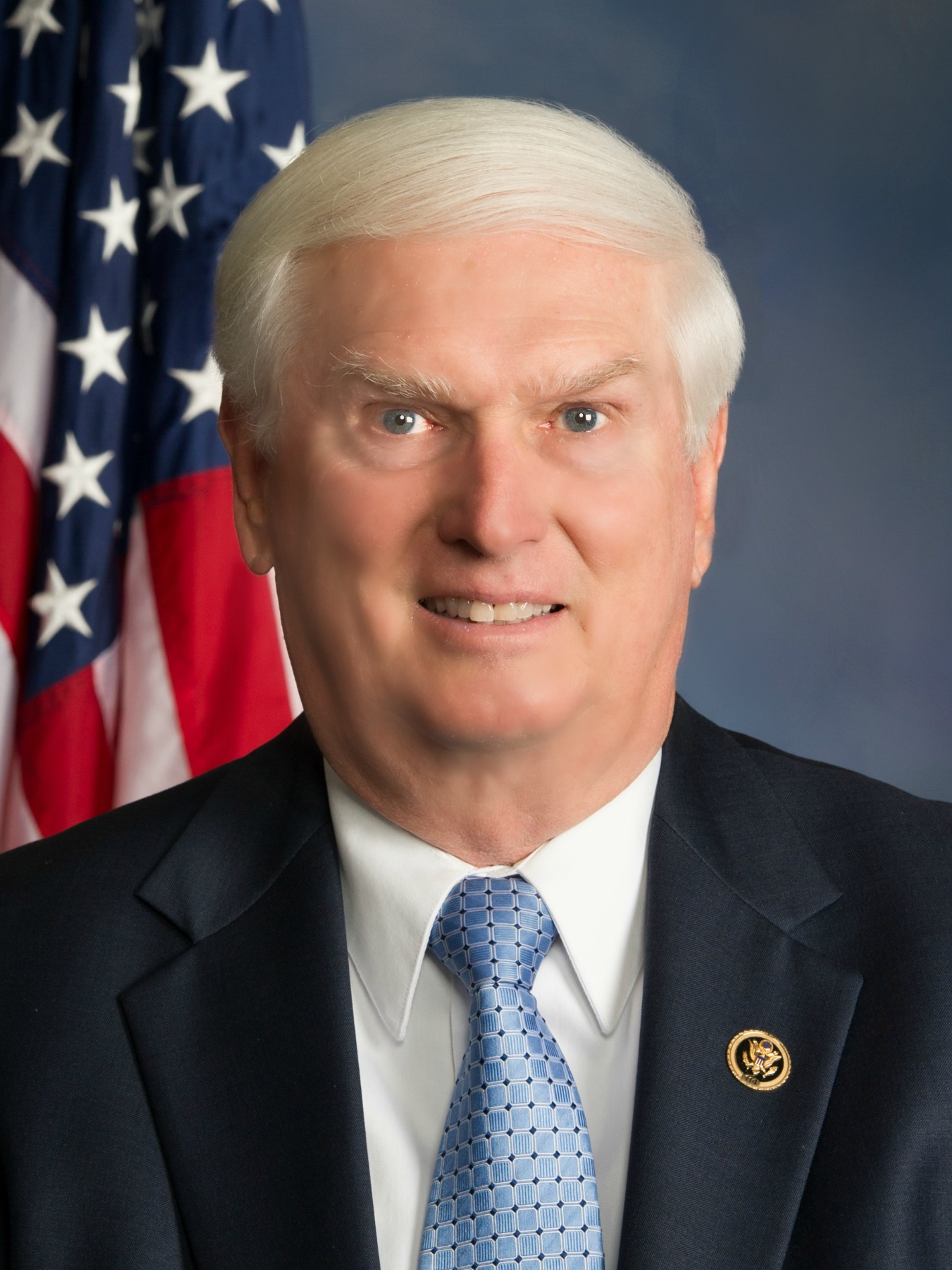

Nominee	Jimmy Duncan	Stuart Starr
Party	Republican	Democratic
Popular vote	212,455	68,401
Percentage	75.6%	24.4%
- County results Duncan: 70–80% 80–90%
U.S. Representative before election
John J. Duncan, Jr.
Republican
Elected U.S. Representative
John J. Duncan, Jr.
Republican

Incumbent Republican Jimmy Duncan, who had represented the district since 1989, ran for re-election. He was re-elected with 73% of the vote in 2014. The district had a PVI of R+20.

=== Republican primary ===
==== Candidates ====
===== Nominee =====
- John J. Duncan Jr., incumbent U.S. Representative

==== Results ====
Republican primary results
Party	Candidate	Votes	%
Republican	John J. Duncan, Jr. (incumbent)	28,806	100.0

=== Democratic primary ===
==== Candidates ====
===== Nominee =====
- Stuart Starr, IT business owner and union organizer

==== Results ====
Democratic primary results
Party	Candidate	Votes	%
Democratic	Stuart Starr	7,851	100.0

=== General election ===
==== Endorsements ====
Jimmy Duncan (R)

Newspapers

- Knoxville News Sentinel

==== Predictions ====
Source	Ranking	As of
The Cook Political Report	Safe R	November 7, 2016
Daily Kos Elections	Safe R	November 7, 2016
Rothenberg	Safe R	November 3, 2016
Sabato's Crystal Ball	Safe R	November 7, 2016
RCP	Safe R	October 31, 2016

==== Results ====
Tennessee's 2nd congressional district, 2016
Party	Candidate	Votes	%
Republican	John J. Duncan, Jr. (incumbent)	212,455	75.6
Democratic	Stuart Starr	68,401	24.4
Total votes		280,856	100.0
Republican hold			

== District 3 ==
2016 Tennessee's congressional district election
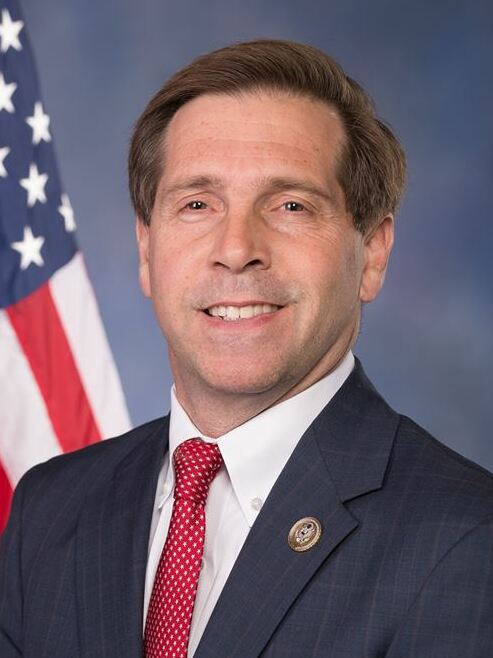

Nominee	Chuck Fleischmann	Melody Shekari
Party	Republican	Democratic
Popular vote	176,613	76,727
Percentage	66.4%	28.9%
- County results Fleischmann: 50–60% 60–70% 70–80% 80–90%
U.S. Representative before election
Chuck Fleischmann
Republican
Elected U.S. Representative
Chuck Fleischmann
Republican

Incumbent Republican Chuck Fleischmann, who had represented the district since 2011, ran for re-election. He was re-elected with 62% of the vote in 2014. The district had a PVI of R+16.

=== Republican primary ===
==== Candidates ====
===== Nominee =====
- Chuck Fleischmann, incumbent U.S. Representative

===== Eliminated in primary =====
- Allan Levene, information technology specialist and perennial candidate
- Geoffery Suhmer Smith

==== Endorsements ====
Chuck Fleischmann

Newspapers

- Knoxville News Sentinel

==== Results ====
Republican primary results
Party	Candidate	Votes	%
Republican	Chuck Fleischmann (incumbent)	31,964	83.9
Republican	Geoffery Suhmer Smith	3,076	8.1
Republican	Allan Levene	3,059	8.0
Total votes		38,099	100.0

=== Democratic primary ===
==== Candidates ====
===== Nominee =====
- Melody Shekari, policy analyst for the Chattanooga Department of Transportation

===== Eliminated in primary =====
- Michael Friedman
- George Ryan Love

==== Endorsements ====
Melody Shekari

Newspapers

- Chattanooga Times
- Knoxville News Sentinel

==== Results ====
Democratic primary results
Party	Candidate	Votes	%
Democratic	Melody Shekari	8,660	53.9
Democratic	Michael Friedman	5,329	33.2
Democratic	George Ryan Love	2,070	12.9
Total votes		16,059	100.0

=== General election ===
==== Campaign ====
Fleischmann was heavily favored to win re-election.

==== Endorsements ====
Chuck Fleischmann (R)

Newspapers

- Chattanooga Free Press
- Knoxville News Sentinel
Melody Shekari (D)

Newspapers

- Chattanooga Times

==== Predictions ====
Source	Ranking	As of
The Cook Political Report	Safe R	November 7, 2016
Daily Kos Elections	Safe R	November 7, 2016
Rothenberg	Safe R	November 3, 2016
Sabato's Crystal Ball	Safe R	November 7, 2016
RCP	Safe R	October 31, 2016

==== Results ====
Tennessee's 3rd congressional district, 2016
Party	Candidate	Votes	%
Republican	Chuck Fleischmann (incumbent)	176,613	66.4
Democratic	Melody Shekari	76,727	28.9
Independent	Rick Tyler	5,098	1.9
Independent	Cassandra Mitchell	5,075	1.9
Independent	Topher Kersting	2,493	0.9
Total votes		266,006	100.0
Republican hold			

== District 4 ==
2016 Tennessee's 4th congressional district election
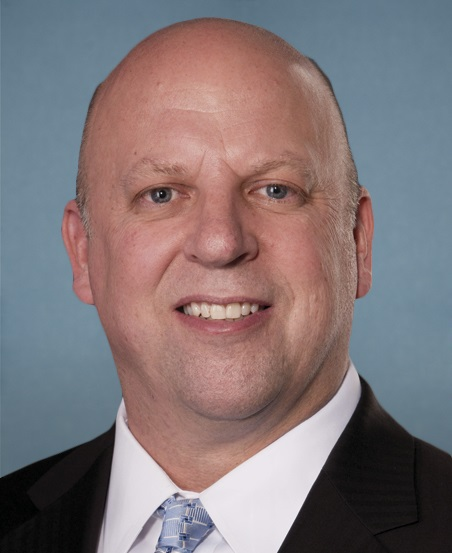

Nominee	Scott DesJarlais	Steven Reynolds
Party	Republican	Democratic
Popular vote	165,796	89,141
Percentage	65.0%	35.0%
- County results DesJarlais: 50–60% 60–70% 70–80%
U.S. Representative before election
Scott DesJarlais
Republican
Elected U.S. Representative
Scott DesJarlais
Republican

Incumbent Republican Scott DesJarlais, who had represented the district since 2011, ran for re-election. He was re-elected with 58% of the vote in 2014. The district had a PVI of R+18.

=== Republican primary ===
==== Candidates ====
===== Nominee =====
- Scott DesJarlais, incumbent U.S. Representative

===== Eliminated in primary =====
- Grant Starrett, real estate developer and attorney

==== Campaign ====
Scandal-ridden incumbent representative Scott DesJarlais had narrowly won his primary in 2012, and faced another competitive primary against Starrett. While DesJarlais originally trailed in fundraising, the race tightened when a mailer sent out by the Starrett campaign sparked controversy over its alleged racism.

==== Results ====
Results by county: DesJarlais: 40–50%; 50–60%; 60–70%; 70–80%; Starrett: 50–60%; 60–70%

Republican primary results
Party	Candidate	Votes	%
Republican	Scott DesJarlais (incumbent)	24,211	52.1
Republican	Grant Starrett	20,138	43.3
Republican	Erran Persley	1,615	3.5
Republican	Yomi Faparusi	493	1.1
Total votes		46,457	100.0

=== Democratic primary ===
==== Candidates ====
===== Nominee =====
- Steven Reynolds, manager in the construction industry

==== Results ====
Democratic primary results
Party	Candidate	Votes	%
Democratic	Steven Reynolds	11,511	100.0

=== General election ===
==== Predictions ====
Source	Ranking	As of
The Cook Political Report	Safe R	November 7, 2016
Daily Kos Elections	Safe R	November 7, 2016
Rothenberg	Safe R	November 3, 2016
Sabato's Crystal Ball	Safe R	November 7, 2016
RCP	Safe R	October 31, 2016

==== Results ====
Tennessee's 4th congressional district, 2016
Party	Candidate	Votes	%
Republican	Scott DesJarlais (incumbent)	165,796	65.0
Democratic	Steven Reynolds	89,141	35.0
Total votes		254,937	100.0
Republican hold			

== District 5 ==
2016 Tennessee's 5th congressional district election
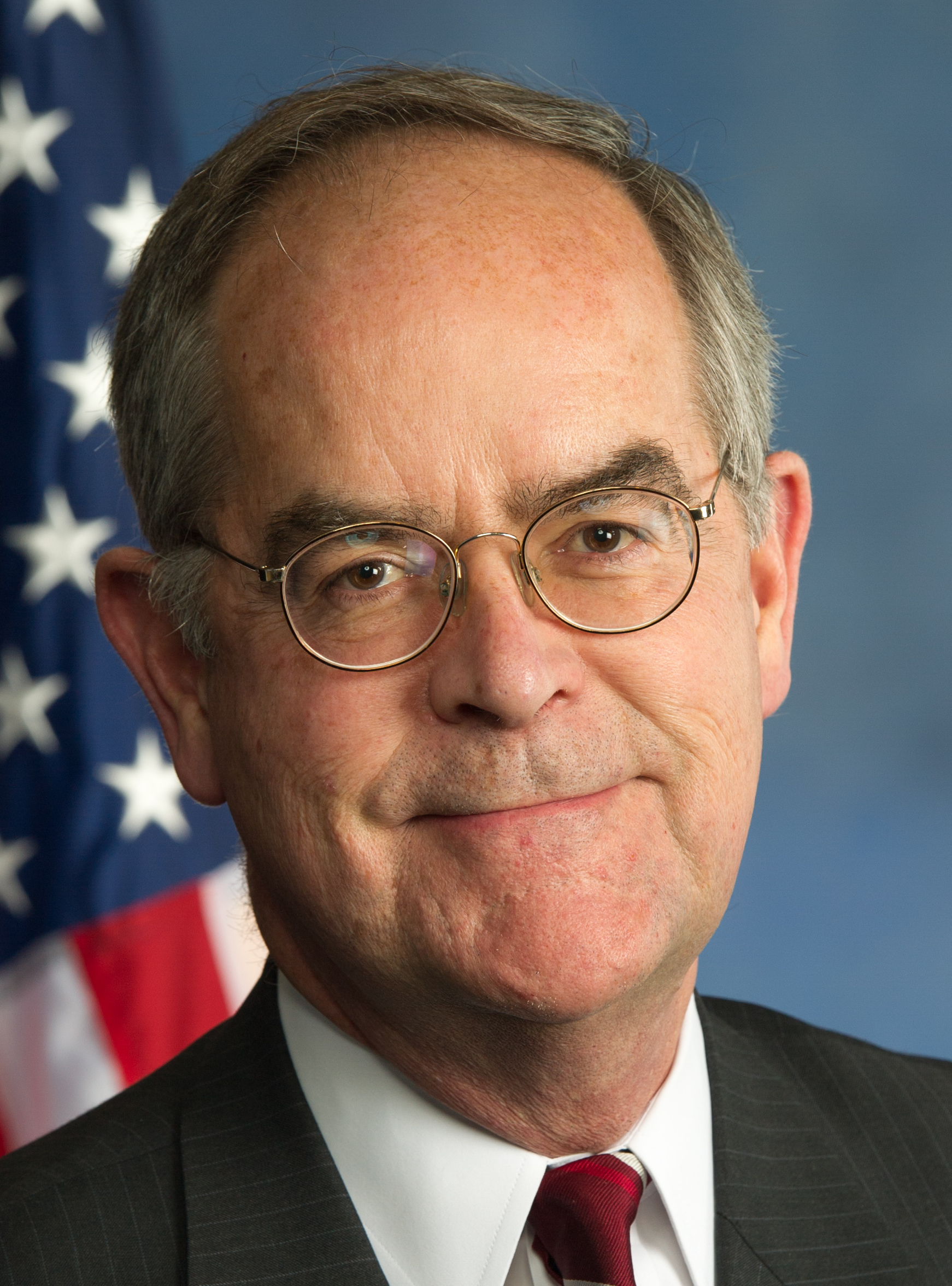

Nominee	Jim Cooper	Stacy Reis Snyder
Party	Democratic	Republican
Popular vote	171,111	102,433
Percentage	62.6%	37.4%
- County results Cooper: 60–70% Ball: 60–70%
U.S. Representative before election
Jim Cooper
Democratic
Elected U.S. Representative
Jim Cooper
Democratic

Incumbent Democrat Jim Cooper, who had represented the district since 2003, as well as previously between 1983 and 1995, ran for re-election. He was re-elected with 62% of the vote in 2014. The district had a PVI of D+5.

=== Democratic primary ===
==== Candidates ====
===== Nominee =====
- Jim Cooper, incumbent U.S. Representative

==== Results ====
Democratic primary results
Party	Candidate	Votes	%
Democratic	Jim Cooper (incumbent)	32,103	100.0

=== Republican primary ===
==== Candidates ====
===== Nominee =====
- Stacy Reis Snyder, small business owner and songwriter

===== Eliminated in primary =====
- Jody Ball, businessman
- John "Big John" Smith, deputy sheriff and candidate for this seat in 2012 & 2014

===== Withdrawn =====
- Ronnie Holden, candidate for this seat in 2014

==== Results ====
Republican primary results
Party	Candidate	Votes	%
Republican	Stacy Ries Snyder	7,666	50.8
Republican	John "Big John" Smith	4,295	28.5
Republican	Jody Ball	3,124	20.7
Total votes		15,085	100.0

=== General election ===
==== Predictions ====
Source	Ranking	As of
The Cook Political Report	Safe D	November 7, 2016
Daily Kos Elections	Safe D	November 7, 2016
Rothenberg	Safe D	November 3, 2016
Sabato's Crystal Ball	Safe D	November 7, 2016
RCP	Safe D	October 31, 2016

==== Results ====
Tennessee's 5th congressional district, 2016
Party	Candidate	Votes	%
Democratic	Jim Cooper (incumbent)	171,111	62.6
Republican	Stacy Ries Snyder	102,433	37.4
Total votes		273,544	100.0
Democratic hold			

== District 6 ==
2016 Tennessee's 6th congressional district election
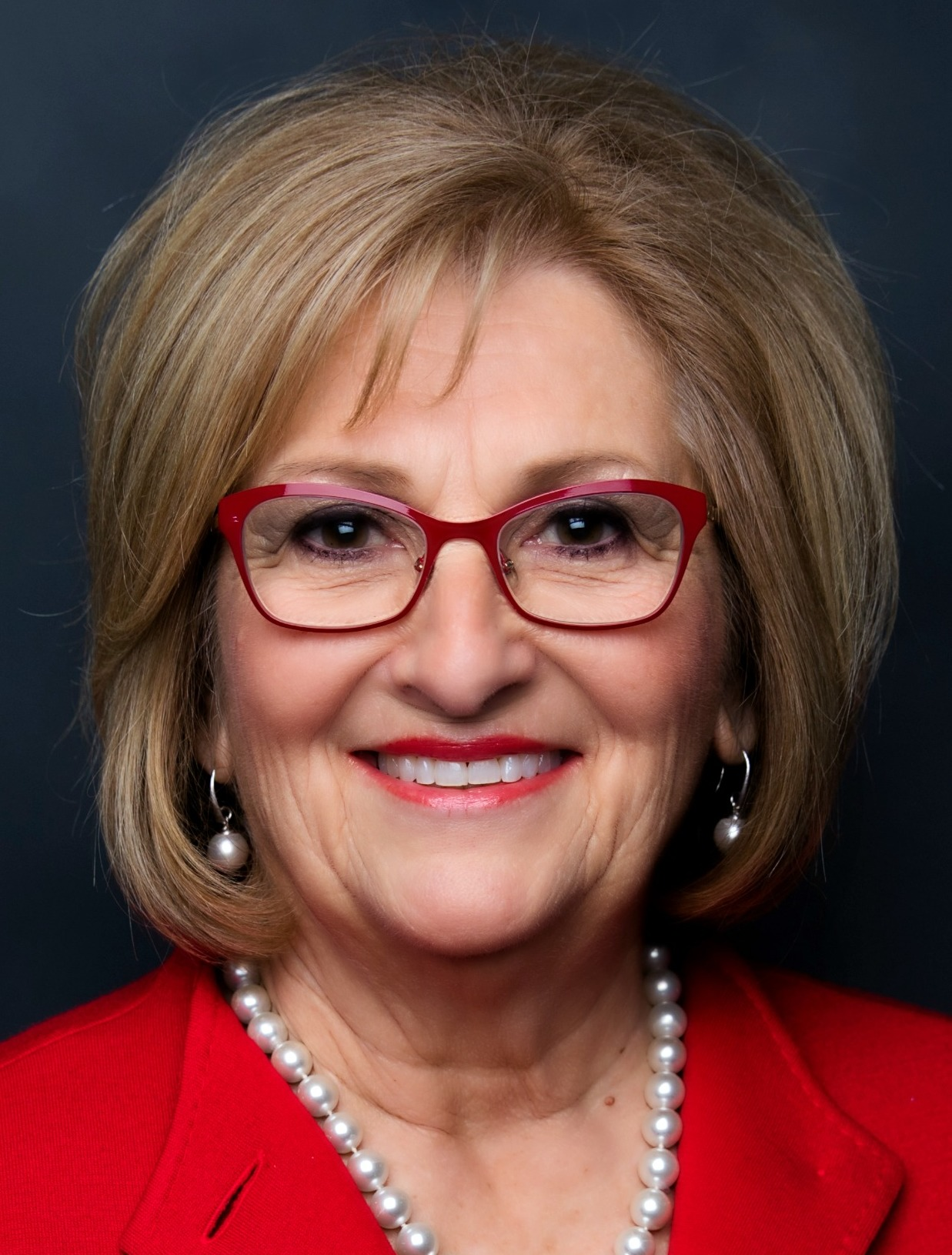

Nominee	Diane Black	David Kent	David Ross
Party	Republican	Democratic	Independent
Popular vote	202,234	61,995	20,261
Percentage	71.1%	21.8%	7.1%
- County results Black: 60–70% 70–80%
U.S. Representative before election
Diane Black
Republican
Elected U.S. Representative
Diane Black
Republican

Incumbent Republican Diane Black, who had represented the district since 2011, ran for re-election. She was re-elected with 64% of the vote in 2014. The district had a PVI of R+21.

=== Republican primary ===
==== Candidates ====
===== Nominee =====
- Diane Black, incumbent U.S. Representative

===== Eliminated in primary =====
- Joe Carr, former state representative and candidate for U.S. Senate in 2014
- Donald Strong
- Tommy Hay

==== Campaign ====
Joe Carr attempted to ride anti-establishment sentiment to defeat incumbent Diane Black, who was openly considering a future run for governor.

==== Results ====
Results by county: Black: 50–60%; 60–70%; 70–80%

Despite a strong challenge, Black won re-election by a larger margin than expected.

Republican primary results
Party	Candidate	Votes	%
Republican	Diane Black (incumbent)	33,215	63.7
Republican	Joe Carr	16,665	31.9
Republican	Donald Strong	1,354	2.6
Republican	Tommy Hay	945	1.8
Total votes		52,179	100.0

=== Democratic primary ===
==== Candidates ====
===== Nominee =====
- David Kent, manufacturing industry manager

===== Eliminated in primary =====
- Flo Matheson, nominee for state representative in 2012

==== Results ====
Democratic primary results
Party	Candidate	Votes	%
Democratic	David Kent	7,551	67.0
Democratic	Flo Matheson	3,714	33.0
Total votes		11,265	100.0

=== General election ===
==== Predictions ====
Source	Ranking	As of
The Cook Political Report	Safe R	November 7, 2016
Daily Kos Elections	Safe R	November 7, 2016
Rothenberg	Safe R	November 3, 2016
Sabato's Crystal Ball	Safe R	November 7, 2016
RCP	Safe R	October 31, 2016

==== Results ====
Tennessee's 6th congressional district, 2016
Party	Candidate	Votes	%
Republican	Diane Black (incumbent)	202,234	71.1
Democratic	David Kent	61,995	21.8
Independent	David Ross	20,261	7.1
Total votes		284,490	100.0
Republican hold			

== District 7 ==
2016 Tennessee's 7th congressional district election
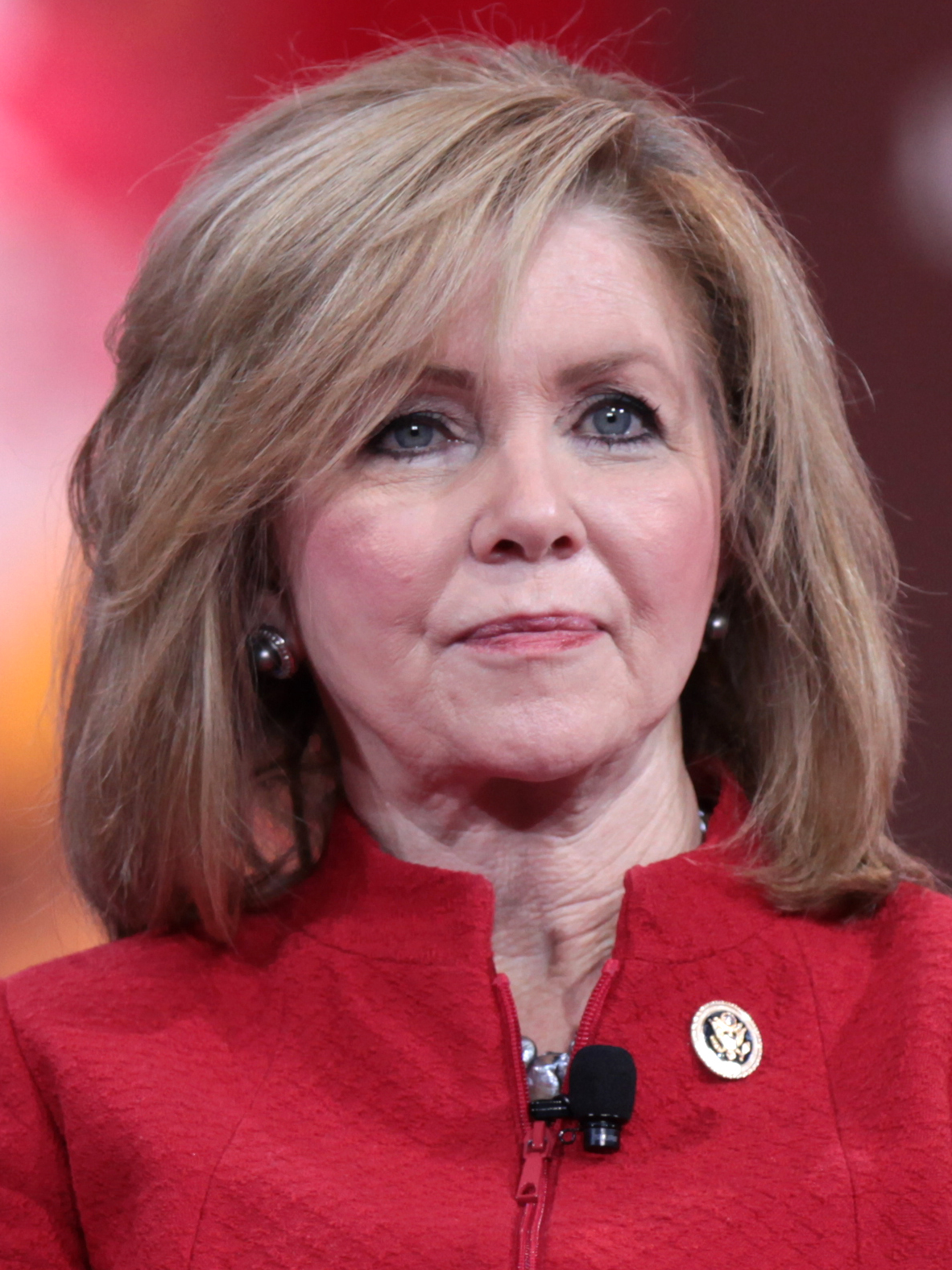

Nominee	Marsha Blackburn	Tharon Chandler
Party	Republican	Democratic
Popular vote	200,407	65,226
Percentage	72.2%	23.5%
- County results Blackburn: 60–70% 70–80% 80–90%
U.S. Representative before election
Marsha Blackburn
Republican
Elected U.S. Representative
Marsha Blackburn
Republican

Incumbent Republican Marsha Blackburn, who had represented the district since 2003, ran for re-election. She was re-elected with 70% of the vote in 2014. The district had a PVI of R+18.

=== Republican primary ===
==== Candidates ====
===== Nominee =====
- Marsha Blackburn, incumbent U.S. Representative

==== Results ====
Republican primary results
Party	Candidate	Votes	%
Republican	Marsha Blackburn (incumbent)	38,490	100.0

=== Democratic primary ===
==== Candidates ====
===== Nominee =====
- Tharon Chandler, journalist

==== Results ====
Democratic primary results
Party	Candidate	Votes	%
Democratic	Tharon Chandler	9,956	100.0

=== General election ===
==== Predictions ====
Source	Ranking	As of
The Cook Political Report	Safe R	November 7, 2016
Daily Kos Elections	Safe R	November 7, 2016
Rothenberg	Safe R	November 3, 2016
Sabato's Crystal Ball	Safe R	November 7, 2016
RCP	Safe R	October 31, 2016

==== Results ====
Blackburn dramatically outspent Chandler and easily won re-election.

Tennessee's 7th congressional district, 2016
Party	Candidate	Votes	%
Republican	Marsha Blackburn (incumbent)	200,407	72.2
Democratic	Tharon Chandler	65,226	23.5
Independent	Leonard D. Ladner	11,880	4.3
Total votes		277,513	100.0
Republican hold			

== District 8 ==
2016 Tennessee's 8th congressional district election
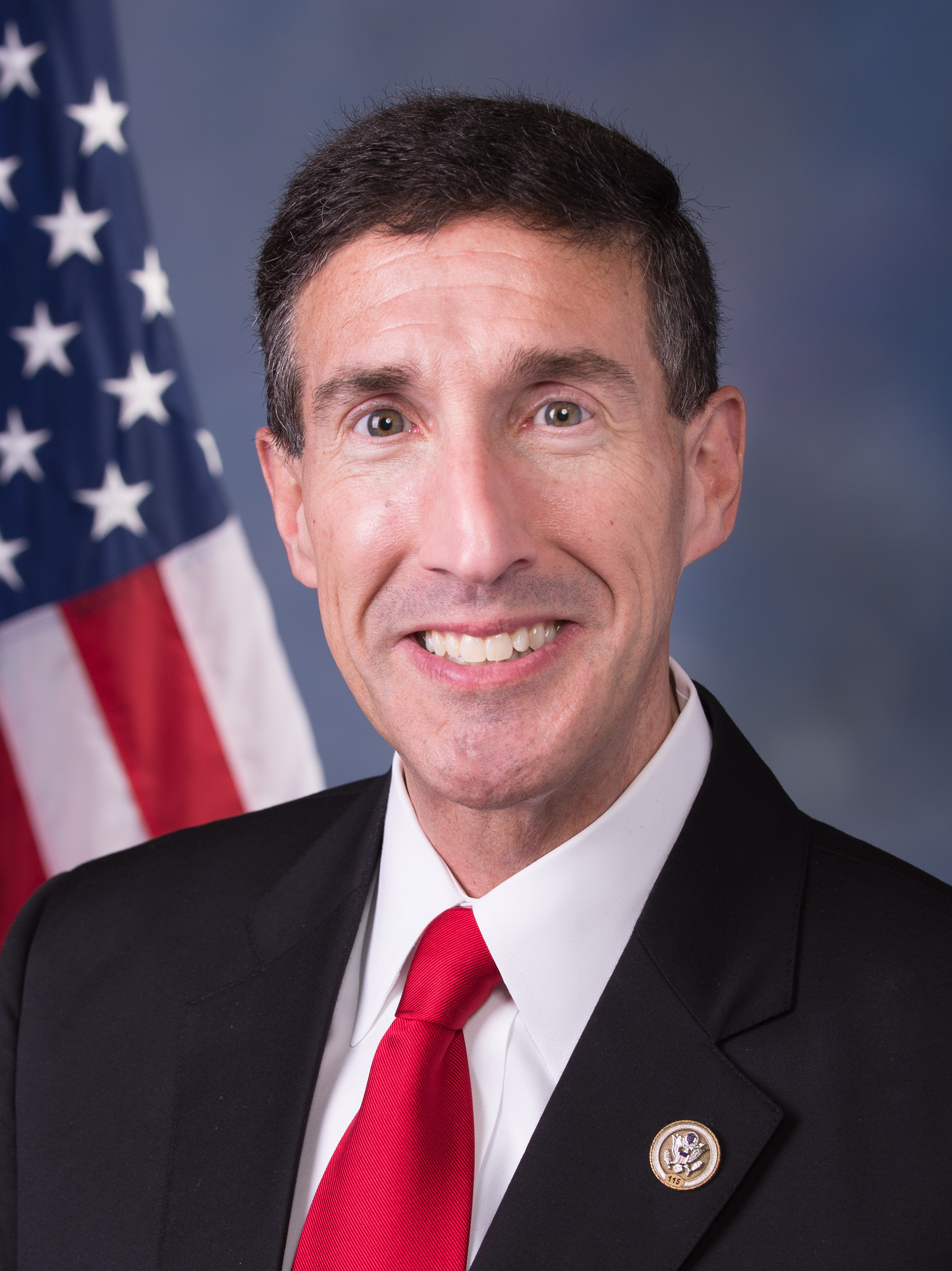

Nominee	David Kustoff	Rickey Hobson
Party	Republican	Democratic
Popular vote	194,386	70,925
Percentage	68.7%	25.1%
- County results Kustoff: 50–60% 60–70% 70–80% Hobson: 40–50%
U.S. Representative before election
Stephen Fincher
Republican
Elected U.S. Representative
David Kustoff
Republican

Incumbent Republican Stephen Fincher, who had represented the district since 2011, announced he would not run for re-election. He was re-elected with 71% of the vote in 2014. The district had a PVI of R+19.

=== Republican primary ===
==== Candidates ====
===== Nominee =====
- David Kustoff, former United States Attorney for the Western District of Tennessee

===== Eliminated in primary =====
- Ken Atkins, corrections officer and former car dealership owner
- Hunter Baker, Union University professor
- Dave Bault, inspector for Terminix
- George Flinn, radiologist and perennial candidate
- Brad Greer, businessman and political consultant
- Brian Kelsey, state senator
- Tom Leatherwood, Shelby County Register of Deeds
- Mark Luttrell, Shelby County Mayor
- David Maldonado, businessman
- David Wharton

===== Withdrawn =====
- Steve Basar, Shelby County Commissioner

===== Declined =====
- Stephen Fincher, incumbent U.S. Representative
- Scott Golden, district director for Congressman Fincher and member of the Tennessee Republican State Executive Committee
- Andy Holt, state representative
- Ed Jackson, state senator
- Ron Kirkland, physician and candidate for this seat in 2010
- Steve McManus, state representative
- Mark Norris, Majority Leader of the Tennessee Senate
- John Ryder, Republican National Committee General Counsel and committee member
- Bill Sanderson, state representative
- John Stevens, state senator
- Matthew Stowe, district attorney general for the 24th judicial district
- Mary Wagner, Shelby County GOP Chair
- Amy Weirich, Shelby County District Attorney

==== Results ====
Results by county: Kustoff: 20–30%; 30–40%; Flinn: 20–30%; 30–40%; 50–60%; Luttrell: 30–40%; Greer: 20–30%; 40–50%; 50–60%

Kustoff won the crowded Republican primary with 27% of the vote.

Republican primary results
Party	Candidate	Votes	%
Republican	David Kustoff	16,889	27.4
Republican	George Flinn	14,200	23.1
Republican	Mark Luttrell	10,878	17.7
Republican	Brian Kelsey	7,942	12.9
Republican	Brad Greer	6,819	11.1
Republican	Tom Leatherwood	2,620	4.3
Republican	Hunter Baker	1,014	1.6
Republican	Ken Atkins	410	0.7
Republican	Raymond Honeycutt	231	0.4
Republican	George B. Howell	211	0.3
Republican	David Wharton	131	0.2
Republican	Dave Bault	109	0.2
Republican	David J Maldonado	76	0.1
Total votes		61,530	100.0

=== Democratic primary ===
==== Candidates ====
===== Nominee =====
- Rickey Hobson, manager at Delta Air Lines

===== Eliminated in primary =====
- Gregory Alan Frye

===== Withdrawn =====
- James Coffman
- Erika Stotts Pearson, sports agent

===== Declined =====
- Roy Herron, former state senator, former Chair of the Tennessee Democratic Party and nominee for this seat in 2010
- Michael McCusker, Shelby County Assistant District Attorney and retired Army Major
- David Vinciarelli

==== Results ====
Democratic primary results
Party	Candidate	Votes	%
Democratic	Rickey Hobson	7,774	54.8
Democratic	Gregory Alan Frye	6,413	45.2
Total votes		14,187	100.0

=== General election ===
==== Predictions ====
Source	Ranking	As of
The Cook Political Report	Safe R	November 7, 2016
Daily Kos Elections	Safe R	November 7, 2016
Rothenberg	Safe R	November 3, 2016
Sabato's Crystal Ball	Safe R	November 7, 2016
RCP	Safe R	October 31, 2016

==== Results ====
Tennessee's 8th congressional district, 2016
Party	Candidate	Votes	%
Republican	David Kustoff	194,386	68.7
Democratic	Rickey Hobson	70,925	25.1
Independent	Shelia L. Godwin	6,442	2.3
Independent	James Hart	4,057	1.4
Independent	Adrian M. Montague	2,497	0.9
Independent	Mark J. Rawles	2,445	0.9
Independent	Karen Free Spirit Talley-Lane	1,981	0.7
Total votes		282,733	100.0
Republican hold			

== District 9 ==
2016 Tennessee's 9th congressional district election
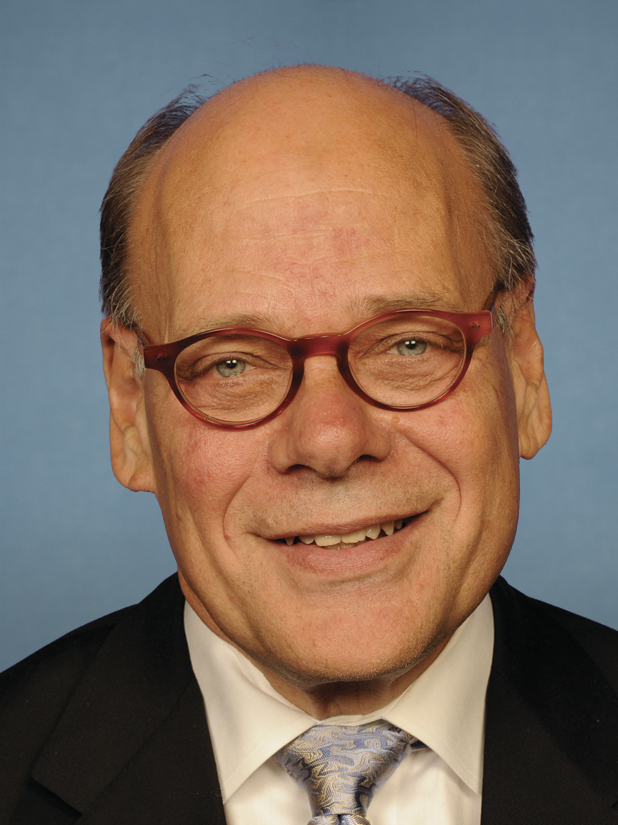

Nominee	Steve Cohen	Wayne Alberson
Party	Democratic	Republican
Popular vote	171,631	41,123
Percentage	78.7%	18.9%
- County result Cohen: 70–80%
U.S. Representative before election
Steve Cohen
Democratic
Elected U.S. Representative
Steve Cohen
Democratic

Incumbent Democrat Steve Cohen, who had represented the district since 2007, ran for re-election. He was re-elected with 75% of the vote in 2014. The district had a PVI of D+25.

=== Democratic primary ===
==== Candidates ====
===== Nominee =====
- Steve Cohen, incumbent U.S. Representative

===== Eliminated in primary =====
- Larry Crim, perennial candidate
- Justin Ford, Shelby County Commission Chair
- Larry Williams

==== Results ====
Democratic primary results
Party	Candidate	Votes	%
Democratic	Steve Cohen (incumbent)	35,645	85.5
Democratic	Justin Ford	4,165	10.0
Democratic	M. LaTroy Williams	1,452	3.5
Democratic	Larry Crim	406	1.0
Total votes		41,668	100.0

=== Republican primary ===
==== Candidates ====
===== Nominee =====
- Wayne Alberson

===== Withdrawn =====
- Palmer Lee Harris
- Ernest Lunati, candidate for this seat in 2012

==== Results ====
Republican primary results
Party	Candidate	Votes	%
Republican	Wayne Alberson	38,490	100.0

=== General election ===
==== Predictions ====
Source	Ranking	As of
The Cook Political Report	Safe D	November 7, 2016
Daily Kos Elections	Safe D	November 7, 2016
Rothenberg	Safe D	November 3, 2016
Sabato's Crystal Ball	Safe D	November 7, 2016
RCP	Safe D	October 31, 2016

==== Results ====
Tennessee's 9th congressional district, 2016
Party	Candidate	Votes	%
Democratic	Steve Cohen (incumbent)	171,631	78.7
Republican	Wayne Alberson	41,123	18.9
Independent	Paul Cook	5,203	2.4
Total votes		217,957	100.0
Democratic hold			

== See also ==
- 2016 Tennessee elections
- 2016 United States elections
