= 2014 United States House of Representatives elections in Tennessee =

- November 4, 2014

All 9 Tennessee seats to the United States House of Representatives
- Turnout: 36.97% ▼24.89 pp
	Majority party	Minority party
Party	Republican	Democratic
Last election	7	2
Seats won	7	2
Seat change	Steady	Steady
Popular vote	848,796	448,421
Percentage	61.91%	32.70%
Swing	▲1.94%	▼2.18%

Republican
50–60%
60–70%
70–80%
80–90%
Democratic
50–60%
60–70%
70–80%

The 2014 United States House of Representatives elections in Tennessee was held on Tuesday, November 4, 2014, to elect the nine U.S. representatives from the state of Tennessee, one from each of the state's nine congressional districts. The elections coincided with the elections of other federal and state offices, including a gubernatorial election and an election to the U.S. Senate.

The primary election for House seats was held on August 7, 2014. Following the general elections, no seats changed hands, leaving the Tennessee delegation at a 7-2 Republican majority.

== Overview ==
Party	Votes	Percentage	Seats before	Seats after	+/–
Republican	848,796	61.91%	7	7	Steady
Democratic	448,421	32.70%	2	2	Steady
Independents	55,523	4.05%	0	0	Steady
Green	13,902	1.01%	0	0	Steady
Constitution	4,451	0.33%	0	0	Steady
Write-Ins	18	0.00	0	0	Steady
Totals	1,371,111	100.00%	9	9	0

Popular vote
Republican	61.91%
Democratic	32.70%
Other	5.39%

House seats
Republican	77.78%
Democratic	22.22%

=== By district ===
Results of the 2014 United States House of Representatives elections in Tennessee by district:

District	Republican		Democratic		Others		Total		Result
District	Votes	%	Votes	%	Votes	%	Votes	%	Result
District 1	115,533	82.84%	0	0.00%	23,937	17.16%	139,470	100.0%	Republican hold
District 2	120,883	72.49%	37,612	22.56%	8,256	1.00%	166,751	100.0%	Republican hold
District 3	97,344	62.36%	53,983	34.58%	4,770	3.06%	156,097	100.0%	Republican hold
District 4	84,815	58.32%	51,357	35.32%	9,246	6.36%	145,418	100.0%	Republican hold
District 5	55,078	35.70%	96,148	62.32%	3,050	1.98%	154,276	100.0%	Democratic hold
District 6	115,231	71.09%	37,232	22.97%	9,634	5.94%	162,097	100.0%	Republican hold
District 7	110,534	70.00%	42,280	26.77%	5,093	3.23%	157,907	100.0%	Republican hold
District 8	122,255	70.83%	42,433	24.59%	7,907	4.58%	172,595	100.0%	Republican hold
District 9	27,173	23.31%	87,376	74.97%	2,001	1.72%	116,550	100.0%	Democratic hold
Total	848,846	61.91%	448,421	32.70%	73,894	5.39%	1,371,161	100.0%	

== District 1 ==
2014 Tennessee's 1st congressional district election
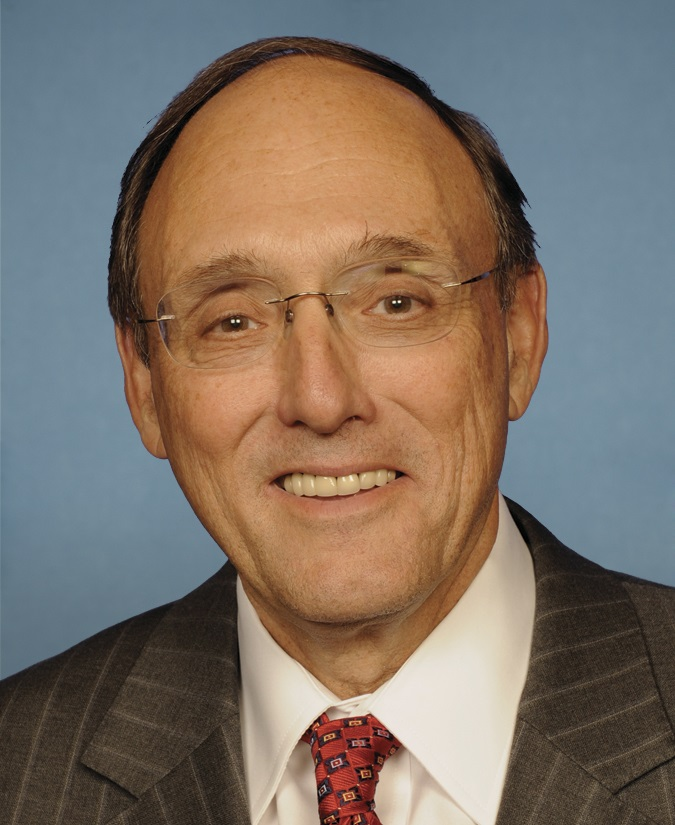

Nominee	Phil Roe	Robert Franklin	Robert Smith
Party	Republican	Independent	Green
Popular vote	115,533	9,906	9,869
Percentage	82.8%	7.1%	7.1%
- County results Roe: 70–80% 80–90%
U.S. Representative before election
Phil Roe
Republican
Elected U.S. Representative
Phil Roe
Republican

Incumbent Republican Phil Roe, who had represented the district since 2009, ran for re-election.

=== Republican primary ===
==== Candidates ====
===== Nominee =====
- Phil Roe, incumbent U.S. Representative

===== Eliminated in primary =====
- Dan Hartley, nurse
- John Rader

==== Results ====
Republican primary results
Party	Candidate	Votes	%
Republican	Phil Roe (incumbent)	73,212	83.7
Republican	Daniel J. Hartley	7,582	8.7
Republican	John Paul Rader	6,663	7.6
Total votes		87,457	100.0

=== Democratic primary ===
No Democrats filed.

=== General election ===
==== Predictions ====
Source	Ranking	As of
The Cook Political Report	Safe R	November 3, 2014
Rothenberg	Safe R	October 24, 2014
Sabato's Crystal Ball	Safe R	October 30, 2014
RCP	Safe R	November 2, 2014
Daily Kos Elections	Safe R	November 4, 2014

==== Results ====
Tennessee's 1st congressional district, 2014
Party	Candidate	Votes	%
Republican	Phil Roe (incumbent)	115,533	82.8
Independent	Robert D. Franklin	9,906	7.1
Green	Robert N. Smith	9,869	7.1
Independent	Michael D. Salyer	4,148	3.0
Independent	Scott Kudialis (write-in)	14	0.0
Total votes		139,470	100.0
Republican hold			

== District 2 ==
2014 Tennessee's 2nd congressional district election
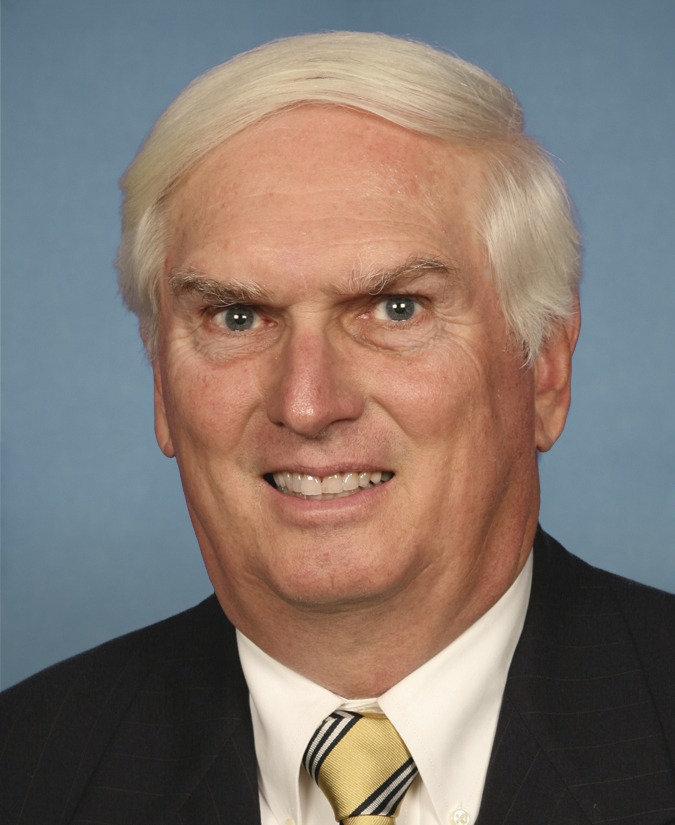

Nominee	Jimmy Duncan	Bob Scott
Party	Republican	Democratic
Popular vote	120,833	37,612
Percentage	72.5%	22.6%
- County results Duncan: 60–70% 70–80%
U.S. Representative before election
John J. Duncan, Jr.
Republican
Elected U.S. Representative
John J. Duncan, Jr.
Republican

Incumbent Republican Jimmy Duncan, who had represented the district since 1988, ran for re-election.

=== Republican primary ===
==== Candidates ====
===== Nominee =====
- Jimmy Duncan, incumbent U.S. Representative

===== Eliminated in primary =====
- Jason Zachary, businessman

==== Results ====
Republican primary results
Party	Candidate	Votes	%
Republican	John J. Duncan, Jr. (incumbent)	50,532	60.5
Republican	Jason Zachary	33,054	39.5
Total votes		83,586	100.0

=== Democratic primary ===
==== Candidates ====
===== Nominee =====
- Bob Scott, engineer, candidate for this seat in 1988, 2004 & 2006 and nominee for this seat in 2008

==== Results ====
Democratic primary results
Party	Candidate	Votes	%
Democratic	Bob Scott	12,715	100.0

=== General election ===
==== Predictions ====
Source	Ranking	As of
The Cook Political Report	Safe R	November 3, 2014
Rothenberg	Safe R	October 24, 2014
Sabato's Crystal Ball	Safe R	October 30, 2014
RCP	Safe R	November 2, 2014
Daily Kos Elections	Safe R	November 4, 2014

==== Results ====
Tennessee's 2nd congressional district, 2014
Party	Candidate	Votes	%
Republican	Jimmy Duncan (incumbent)	120,833	72.5
Democratic	Bob Scott	37,612	22.6
Green	Norris Dryer	4,033	2.4
Independent	Casey Adam Gouge	4,223	2.5
Total votes		166,701	100.0
Republican hold			

== District 3 ==
2014 Tennessee's 3rd congressional district election
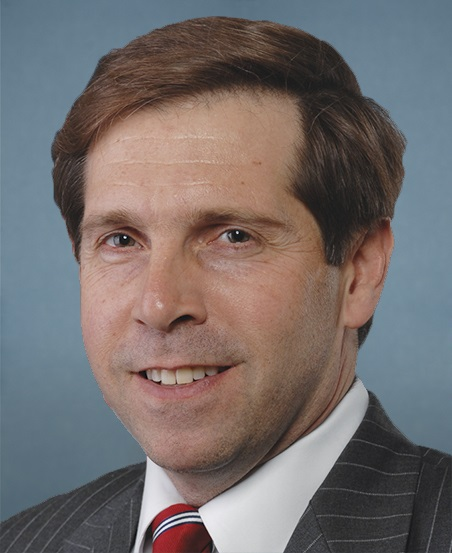

Nominee	Chuck Fleischmann	Mary Headrick
Party	Republican	Democratic
Popular vote	97,344	53,983
Percentage	62.3%	34.6%
- County results Fleischmann: 50–60% 60–70% 70–80%
U.S. Representative before election
Chuck Fleischmann
Republican
Elected U.S. Representative
Chuck Fleischmann
Republican

Incumbent Republican Chuck Fleischmann, who had represented the district since 2011, ran for re-election.

=== Republican primary ===
==== Candidates ====
===== Nominee =====
- Chuck Fleischmann, incumbent U.S. Representative

===== Eliminated in primary =====
- Weston Wamp, businessman and son of former U.S. Representative Zach Wamp and primary challenger in 2012

==== Results ====
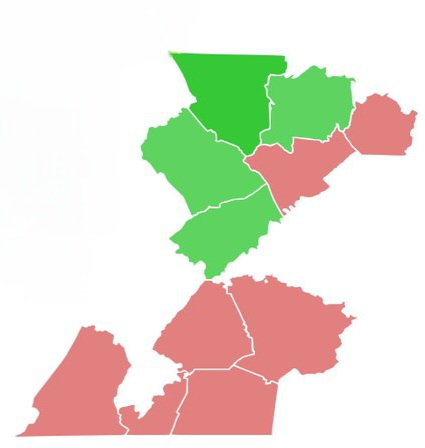
Primary results by county: Fleischmann: 50–60%; Wamp: 50–60%; 60–70%

Republican primary results
Party	Candidate	Votes	%
Republican	Chuck Fleischmann (incumbent)	46,556	50.8%
Republican	Weston Wamp	45,082	49.2%
Republican	Harry Lane (write-in)	2	0.0%
Total votes		91,640	100.0%

=== Democratic primary ===
==== Candidates ====
===== Nominee =====
- Mary Headrick, emergency room physician and nominee for this seat in 2012

==== Results ====
Democratic primary results
Party	Candidate	Votes	%
Democratic	Mary M. Headrick	23,646	100.0%

=== General election ===
==== Predictions ====
Source	Ranking	As of
The Cook Political Report	Safe R	November 3, 2014
Rothenberg	Safe R	October 24, 2014
Sabato's Crystal Ball	Safe R	October 30, 2014
RCP	Safe R	November 2, 2014
Daily Kos Elections	Safe R	November 4, 2014

==== Results ====
Tennessee's 3rd congressional district, 2014
Party	Candidate	Votes	%
Republican	Chuck Fleischmann (incumbent)	97,344	62.3%
Democratic	Mary Headrick	53,983	34.6%
Independent	Cassandra Mitchell	4,770	3.1%
Total votes		156,097	100.0%
Republican hold			

== District 4 ==
2014 Tennessee's 4th congressional district election
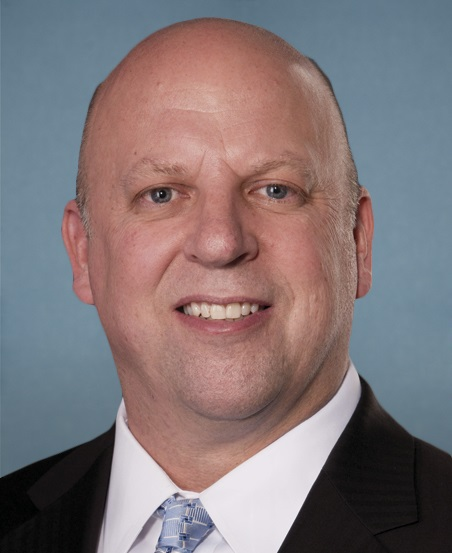

Nominee	Scott DesJarlais	Lenda Sherrell	Robert Rankin Doggart
Party	Republican	Democratic	Independent
Popular vote	84,815	51,357	9,246
Percentage	58.3%	35.3%	6.4%
- County results DesJarlais: 50–60% 60–70% 70–80%
U.S. Representative before election
Scott DesJarlais
Republican
Elected U.S. Representative
Scott DesJarlais
Republican

Incumbent Republican Scott DesJarlais, who had represented the district since 2011, ran for re-election.

=== Republican primary ===
==== Campaign ====
DesJarlais was considered one of the most vulnerable Congressmen after revelations emerged in October 2012 that he had prescribed drugs to a patient with whom he was having an affair, and had pressured his former wife and former mistress to have several abortions. He was re-elected in 2012 with a reduced majority.

State Senator Jim Tracy challenged DesJarlais in the primary. As of the end of June 2013, Tracy had raised nearly $750,000 (including over $300,000 in the second quarter of 2013) for his bid. He raised an additional $150,000 in the fourth quarter and reported $840,000 cash-on-hand. By contrast, at the end of September, DesJarlais reported $170,000 cash-on-hand.

Former Tennessee's 4th congressional district Congressman Van Hilleary endorsed Jim Tracy, as did former Tennessee Governor Winfield Dunn, Lieutenant Governor Ron Ramsey, and House Speaker Beth Harwell.

Despite his vulnerabilities, in the final days before the August 7 primary, DesJarlais seemed to have a chance at holding onto his seat, according to GOP operatives who thought voters had forgiven his poor behavior.

==== Candidates ====
===== Nominee =====
- Scott DesJarlais, incumbent U.S. Representative

===== Eliminated in primary =====
- John Anderson, teacher
- Yomi Faparusi, physician, attorney and researcher
- Steve Lane, teacher
- David Tate, systems engineer
- Jim Tracy, state senator and candidate for the 6th District in 2010
- Michael Warden, Army veteran

===== Withdrawn =====
- Joe Carr, state representative (ran for the U.S. Senate)

===== Declined =====
- Kevin Brooks, state representative
- Tim Gobble, former Bradley County Sheriff
- Forrest Shoaf, former executive at Cracker Barrel

==== Polling ====
Poll source	Date(s) administered	Sample size	Margin of error	Scott DesJarlais	Jim Tracy	Other	Undecided
Right Way Marketing (R-DesJarlais)	June 5–6, 2014	1,337	–	45%	20%	5%	30%

==== Results ====
After all precincts reported, DesJarlais led Tracy by just 33 votes, which widened to 38 after provisional ballots were counted. Tracy contemplated a challenge to the election. However, the Monday after the election, he issued a statement conceding to DesJarlais, saying, "A contest would not be the right thing for the Republican party and the conservative cause in Tennessee."

Primary results by county: DesJarlais: 40–50%; 50–60%; 60–70%; 70–80%; Tracy: 30–40%; 40–50%; 50–60%

Republican primary results
Party	Candidate	Votes	%
Republican	Scott DesJarlais (incumbent)	34,793	44.89%
Republican	Jim Tracy	34,755	44.84%
Republican	John Anderson	4,592	5.93%
Republican	Steve Lane	1,483	1.91%
Republican	David R. Tate	938	1.21%
Republican	Michael S. Warden	659	0.85%
Republican	Oluyomi "Fapas" Faparusi, Sr.	284	0.37%
Total votes		77,504	100.00%

=== Democratic primary ===
==== Candidates ====
===== Nominee =====
- Lenda Sherrell, accounting firm auditor

==== Results ====
Democratic primary results
Party	Candidate	Votes	%
Democratic	Lenda Sherrell	22,859	100.00%

=== General election ===
==== Predictions ====
Source	Ranking	As of
The Cook Political Report	Safe R	November 3, 2014
Rothenberg	Safe R	October 24, 2014
Sabato's Crystal Ball	Safe R	October 30, 2014
RCP	Safe R	November 2, 2014
Daily Kos Elections	Safe R	November 4, 2014

==== Results ====
Tennessee's 4th congressional district, 2014
Party	Candidate	Votes	%
Republican	Scott DesJarlais (incumbent)	84,815	58.32%
Democratic	Lenda Sherrell	51,357	35.32%
Independent	Robert Rankin Doggart	9,246	6.36%
Total votes		145,418	100.00%
Republican hold			

== District 5 ==
2014 Tennessee's 5th congressional district election
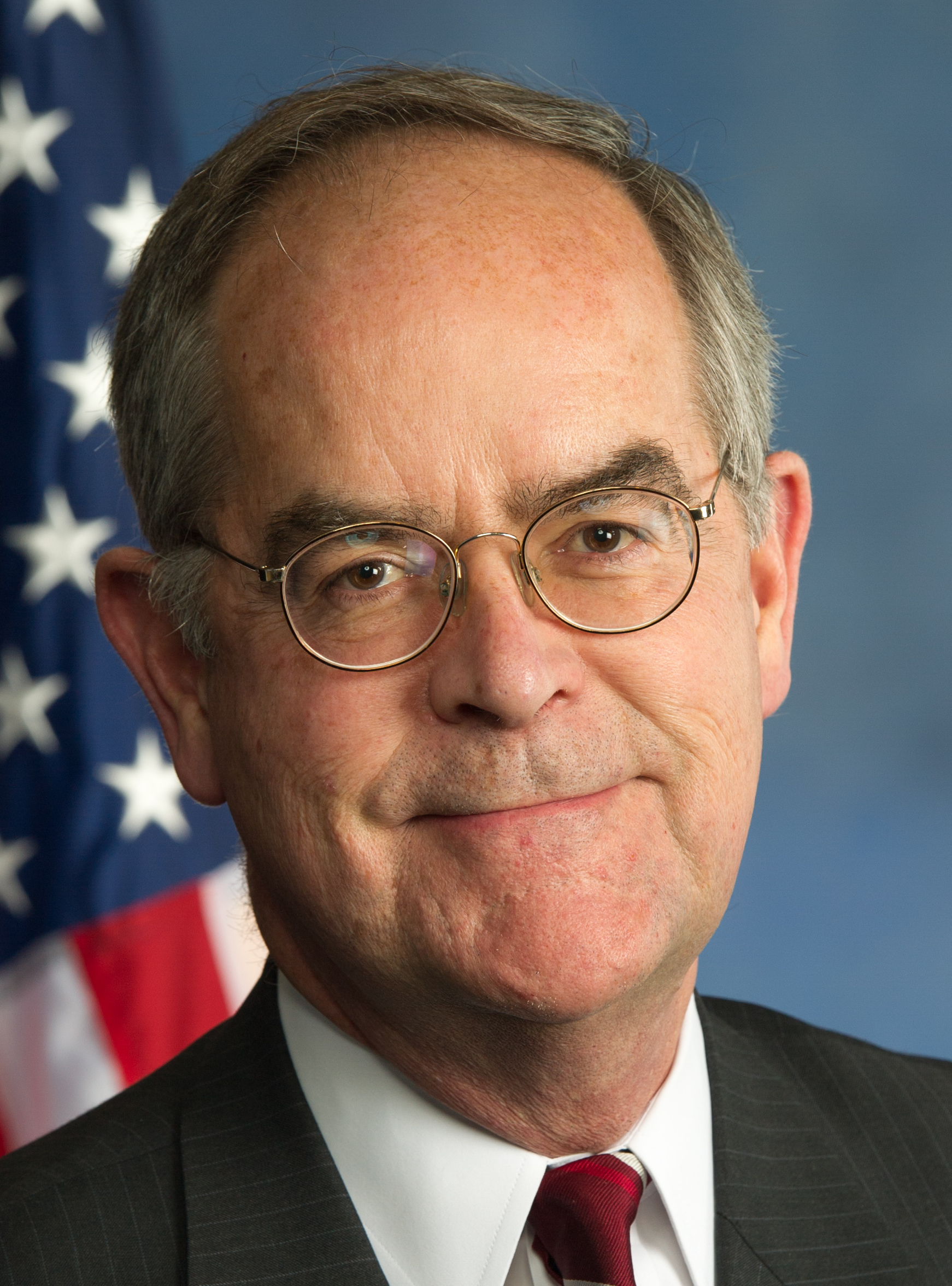

Nominee	Jim Cooper	Bob Ries
Party	Democratic	Republican
Popular vote	96,148	55,078
Percentage	62.3%	35.7%
- County results Cooper: 60–70% Ries: 50–60%
U.S. Representative before election
Jim Cooper
Democratic
Elected U.S. Representative
Jim Cooper
Democratic

Incumbent Democrat Jim Cooper, who had represented the district since 2003 and the 4th District between 1983 and 1995, ran for re-election.

=== Democratic primary ===
==== Candidates ====
===== Nominee =====
- Jim Cooper, incumbent U.S. Representative

==== Results ====
Democratic primary results
Party	Candidate	Votes	%
Democratic	Jim Cooper (incumbent)	40,831	100.0

=== Republican primary ===
==== Candidates ====
===== Nominee =====
- Bob Ries, business owner and candidate for this seat in 2012

===== Eliminated in primary =====
- Chris Carter, systems software designer
- Ronnie Holden
- John Smith, deputy sheriff and candidate for this seat in 2012

===== Removed from ballot =====
- David Russell

==== Results ====
Republican primary results
Party	Candidate	Votes	%
Republican	Bob Ries	11,415	37.8
Republican	Chris Carter	9,004	29.8
Republican	John "Big John" Smith	5,330	17.7
Republican	Ronnie Holden	4,434	14.7
Total votes		30,183	100.0

=== General election ===
==== Predictions ====
Source	Ranking	As of
The Cook Political Report	Safe D	November 3, 2014
Rothenberg	Safe D	October 24, 2014
Sabato's Crystal Ball	Safe D	October 30, 2014
RCP	Safe D	November 2, 2014
Daily Kos Elections	Safe D	November 4, 2014

==== Results ====
Tennessee's 5th congressional district, 2014
Party	Candidate	Votes	%
Democratic	Jim Cooper (incumbent)	96,148	62.3
Republican	Bob Ries	55,078	35.7
Independent	Paul Deakin	3,050	2.0
Total votes		154,276	100.0
Democratic hold			

== District 6 ==
2014 Tennessee's 6th congressional district election
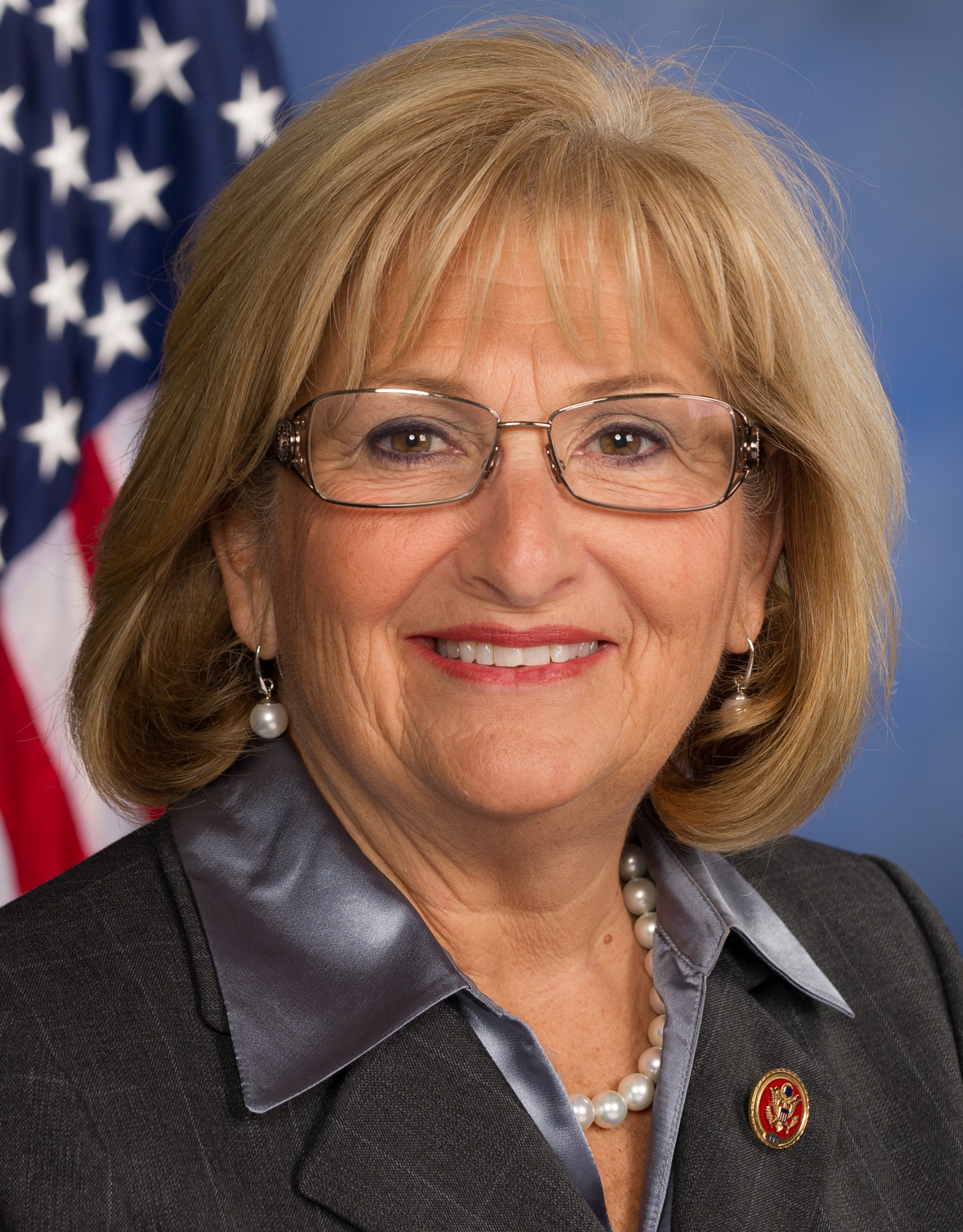

Nominee	Diane Black	Amos Scott Powers	Mike Winton
Party	Republican	Democratic	Independent
Popular vote	115,231	37,232	9,634
Percentage	71.1%	23.0%	5.9%
- County results Black: 50–60% 60–70% 70–80%
U.S. Representative before election
Diane Black
Republican
Elected U.S. Representative
Diane Black
Republican

Incumbent Republican Diane Black, who had represented the district since 2011, ran for re-election.

=== Republican primary ===
==== Candidates ====
===== Nominee =====
- Diane Black, incumbent U.S. Representative

===== Eliminated in primary =====
- Jerry Lowery, education administrator

==== Results ====
Republican primary results
Party	Candidate	Votes	%
Republican	Diane Black (incumbent)	67,907	76.7
Republican	Jerry Lowery	20,664	23.3
Total votes		88,571	100.0

=== Democratic primary ===
==== Candidates ====
===== Nominee =====
- Amos Powers

==== Results ====
Democratic primary results
Party	Candidate	Votes	%
Democratic	Amos Scott Powers	22,347	100.0

=== General election ===
==== Predictions ====
Source	Ranking	As of
The Cook Political Report	Safe R	November 3, 2014
Rothenberg	Safe R	October 24, 2014
Sabato's Crystal Ball	Safe R	October 30, 2014
RCP	Safe R	November 2, 2014
Daily Kos Elections	Safe R	November 4, 2014

==== Results ====
Tennessee's 6th congressional district, 2014
Party	Candidate	Votes	%
Republican	Diane Black (incumbent)	115,231	71.1
Democratic	Amos Scott Powers	37,232	23.0
Independent	Mike Winton	9,634	5.9
Total votes		162,097	100.0
Republican hold			

== District 7 ==
2014 Tennessee's 7th congressional district election
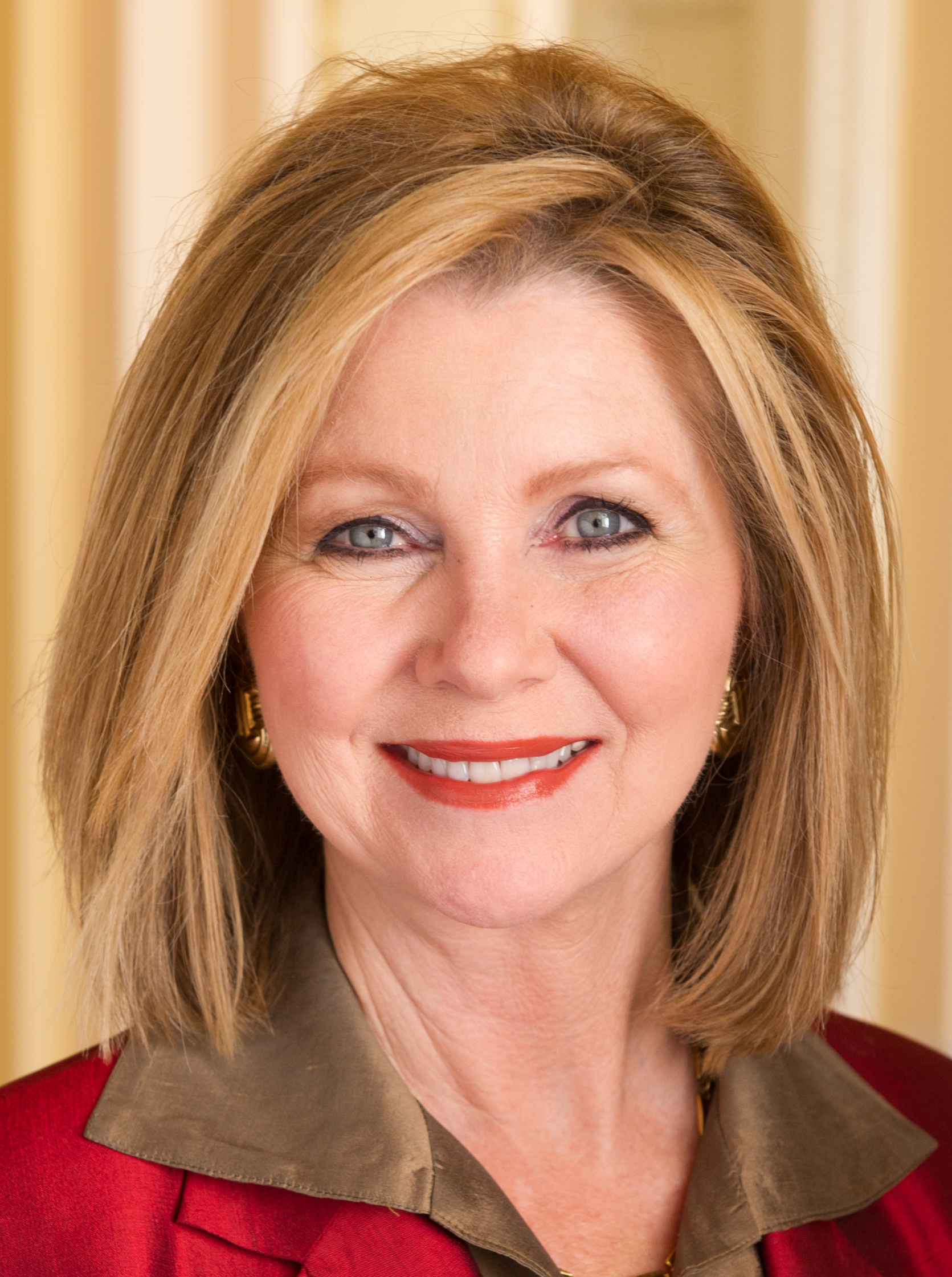

Nominee	Marsha Blackburn	Daniel Cramer
Party	Republican	Democratic
Popular vote	110,534	42,280
Percentage	70.0%	26.8%
- County results Blackburn: 50–60% 60–70% 70–80%
U.S. Representative before election
Marsha Blackburn
Republican
Elected U.S. Representative
Marsha Blackburn
Republican

Incumbent Republican Marsha Blackburn, who had represented the district since 2003, ran for re-election.

=== Republican primary ===
==== Candidates ====
===== Nominee =====
- Marsha Blackburn, incumbent U.S. Representative

===== Eliminated in primary =====
- Jacob Brimm

==== Results ====
Republican primary results
Party	Candidate	Votes	%
Republican	Marsha Blackburn (incumbent)	64,984	84.2
Republican	Jacob Brimm	12,202	15.8
Total votes		77,186	100.0

=== Democratic primary ===
==== Candidates ====
===== Nominee =====
- Daniel Cramer, former Army warrant officer

===== Eliminated in primary =====
- Credo Amouzouvik, founder/CEO of the Homeffa Foundation, and candidate for this seat in 2012

==== Results ====
Democratic primary results
Party	Candidate	Votes	%
Democratic	Daniel Cramer	20,266	81.0
Democratic	Credo Comlan Amouzouvik	4,751	19.0
Total votes		25,017	100.0

=== General election ===
==== Predictions ====
Source	Ranking	As of
The Cook Political Report	Safe R	November 3, 2014
Rothenberg	Safe R	October 24, 2014
Sabato's Crystal Ball	Safe R	October 30, 2014
RCP	Safe R	November 2, 2014
Daily Kos Elections	Safe R	November 4, 2014

==== Results ====
Tennessee's 7th congressional district, 2014
Party	Candidate	Votes	%
Republican	Marsha Blackburn (incumbent)	110,534	70.0
Democratic	Daniel Cramer	42,280	26.8
Independent	Leonard D. Ladner	5,093	3.2
Total votes		157,907	100.0
Republican hold			

== District 8 ==
2014 Tennessee's 8th congressional district election
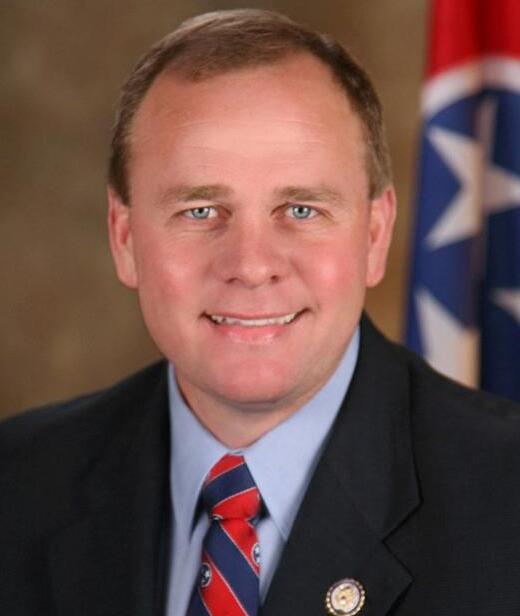

Nominee	Stephen Fincher	Wes Bradley
Party	Republican	Democratic
Popular vote	122,255	42,433
Percentage	70.8%	24.6%
- County results Fincher: 40–50% 50–60% 60–70% 70–80%
U.S. Representative before election
Stephen Fincher
Republican
Elected U.S. Representative
Stephen Fincher
Republican

Incumbent Republican Stephen Fincher, who had represented the district since 2011, ran for re-election.

=== Republican primary ===
==== Candidates ====
===== Nominee =====
- Stephen Fincher, incumbent U.S. Representative

===== Eliminated in primary =====
- Dana Matheny, corporate director of clinical standardization at Methodist Le Bonheur Healthcare
- John Mills

==== Results ====
Republican primary results
Party	Candidate	Votes	%
Republican	Stephen Lee Fincher	68,472	79.0
Republican	Dana Matheny	11,823	13.7
Republican	John Mills	6,339	7.3
Republican	Nicholas Pegues (write-in)	1	0.0
Total votes		86,635	100.0

=== Democratic primary ===
==== Candidates ====
===== Nominee =====
- Wes Bradley, sheriff's deputy for Henry County

===== Eliminated in primary =====
- Rickey Hobson, manager at Delta Air Lines
- Lawrence Pivnick
- Tom Reasons

==== Results ====
Democratic primary results
Party	Candidate	Votes	%
Democratic	Wes Bradley	9,400	34.7
Democratic	Rickey Hobson	9,014	33.3
Democratic	Tom Reasons	5,547	20.5
Democratic	Lawrence A. Pivnick	3,105	11.5
Total votes		27,066	100.0

=== General election ===
==== Predictions ====
Source	Ranking	As of
The Cook Political Report	Safe R	November 3, 2014
Rothenberg	Safe R	October 24, 2014
Sabato's Crystal Ball	Safe R	October 30, 2014
RCP	Safe R	November 2, 2014
Daily Kos Elections	Safe R	November 4, 2014

==== Results ====
Tennessee's 8th congressional district, 2014
Party	Candidate	Votes	%
Republican	Stephen Fincher (incumbent)	122,255	70.8
Democratic	Wes Bradley	42,433	24.6
Constitution	Mark Rawles	4,451	2.6
Independent	James L. Hart	3,452	2.0
Independent	Dana Matheny (write-in)	4	0.0
Total votes		172,595	100.0
Republican hold			

== District 9 ==
2014 Tennessee's 9th congressional district election
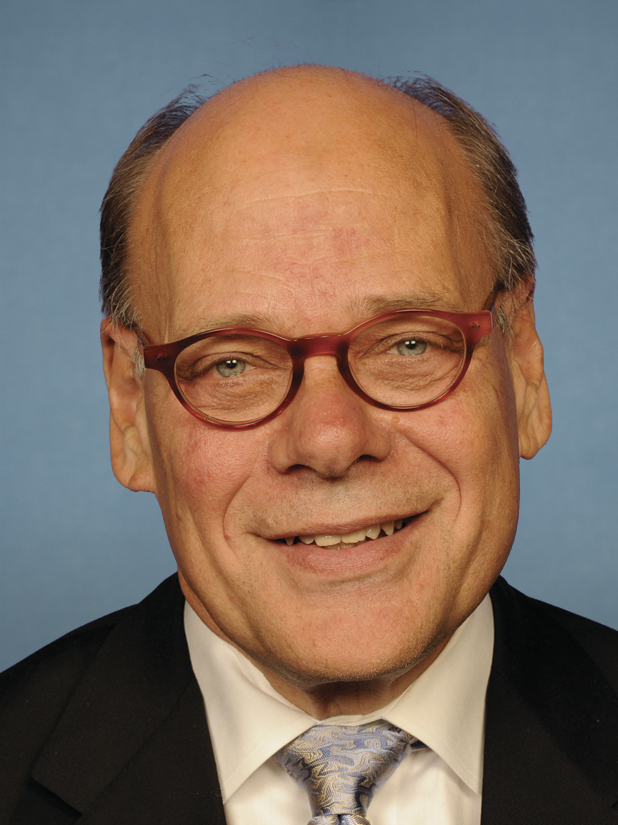

Nominee	Steve Cohen	Charlotte Bergmann
Party	Democratic	Republican
Popular vote	87,376	27,173
Percentage	75.0%	23.3%
- County result Cohen: 70–80%
U.S. Representative before election
Steve Cohen
Democratic
Elected U.S. Representative
Steve Cohen
Democratic

Incumbent Democrat Steve Cohen, who had represented the district since 2007, ran for re-election.

=== Democratic primary ===
==== Candidates ====
===== Nominee =====
- Steve Cohen, incumbent U.S. Representative

===== Eliminated in primary =====
- Isaac Richmond, founder of the Commission on Religion and Racism
- Ricky Wilkins, attorney

==== Results ====
Democratic primary results
Party	Candidate	Votes	%
Democratic	Steve Cohen (incumbent)	45,423	66.2
Democratic	Ricky Wilkins	22,336	32.5
Democratic	Isaac Richmond	876	1.3
Total votes		68,635	100.0

=== Republican primary ===
==== Candidates ====
===== Nominee =====
- Charlotte Bergmann, business manager

==== Results ====
Republican primary results
Party	Candidate	Votes	%
Republican	Charlotte Bergmann	18,579	100.0

=== General election ===
==== Predictions ====
Source	Ranking	As of
The Cook Political Report	Safe D	November 3, 2014
Rothenberg	Safe D	October 24, 2014
Sabato's Crystal Ball	Safe D	October 30, 2014
RCP	Safe D	November 2, 2014
Daily Kos Elections	Safe D	November 4, 2014

==== Results ====
Tennessee's 9th congressional district, 2014
Party	Candidate	Votes	%
Democratic	Steve Cohen (incumbent)	87,376	75.0
Republican	Charlotte Bergmann	27,173	23.3
Independent	Floyd Wayne Alberson	766	0.7
Independent	Paul Cook	752	0.6
Independent	Herbert Bass	483	0.4
Total votes		116,550	100.00
Democratic hold			

== See also ==
- 2014 Tennessee elections
- 2014 United States elections
