= Joe S. Carr =

American politician

Joe Carr

Mayor of Rutherford County
- In office September 1, 2022 – August 31, 2026
- Preceded by: Bill Ketron
- Succeeded by: Randy Allen

Member of the Tennessee House of Representatives from the 48th district
- In office January 2009 – January 2015
- Preceded by: John Hood
- Succeeded by: Bryan Terry

Personal details
- Party: Republican
- Spouse: Ginny Carr
- Children: 3
- Education: Middle Tennessee State University
- Website: House website

Joe S. Carr is a former member of the Tennessee House of Representatives, and a member of the Tennessee Republican Party. Representative Carr was first elected as a state representative from the 48th legislative district in 2008 for the 106th Tennessee General Assembly. He served from 2008 through 2014 before stepping down to run against Senator Lamar Alexander in the Tennessee Republican Primary. Representative Carr ran an unsuccessful campaign for the United States Senate in the Republican primary, challenging incumbent Republican Lamar Alexander. On May 3, 2022, Carr won the Republican nomination for Rutherford County Mayor, and he went on to win the general election on August 4, 2022.

On May 5, 2026, Joe Carr was defeated by Republican candidate Randy Allen in the Republican Primary for Rutherford County Mayor, with current County Mayor Carr finishing second and County Commissioner Craig Harris finishing third.

Allen, the Chief Operations Officer for the Rutherford County Area Habitat for Humanity, received 6,412 votes. Joe Carr received 6,081 votes and Harris received 5,580 votes.

== Career ==
Carr was first elected to the Tennessee House of Representatives in 2008. He had been running for the United States House of Representatives in the 2014 elections, challenging incumbent Scott DesJarlais in Tennessee's 4th congressional district. Carr decided instead to run for the United States Senate in the 2014 election, challenging incumbent Republican Lamar Alexander.

He ran for the United States House of Representatives in the 2016 elections, challenging incumbent Diane Black in Tennessee's 6th congressional district.

Carr ran in the Tennessee State Senate District 14 Special Election in early 2018 for the vacant seat. The vacant seat was created after Jim Tracy's resignation to serve in federal administration.

On May 3, 2022, Carr won the Republican nomination for Rutherford County Mayor with 6,862 votes, narrowly defeating second place finisher Rhonda Allen, who earned 6,239 votes. The incumbent mayor Bill Ketron received 4,487 votes. On August 4, 2022, Carr went on to win the general election for mayor with 12,518 votes. He defeated three independent candidates: Randy Allen, who earned 10,387 votes; Royce Olen Johnson, who earned 2,705 votes; and Norman Hanks, who earned 1,853 votes.

On May 5, 2026, Joe Carr was defeated by Republican candidate Randy Allen in the Republican Primary for Rutherford County Mayor, with current County Mayor Carr finishing second and County Commissioner Craig Harris finishing third.

Allen, the Chief Operations Officer for the Rutherford County Area Habitat for Humanity, received 6,412 votes. Joe Carr received 6,081 votes and Harris received 5,580 votes.

== Personal life ==
Carr graduated from Middle Tennessee State University in 1981. He and his wife, Ginny, have three children. They live in Lascassas, near Murfreesboro.
