= Chuck Fleischmann =

American politician (born 1962)

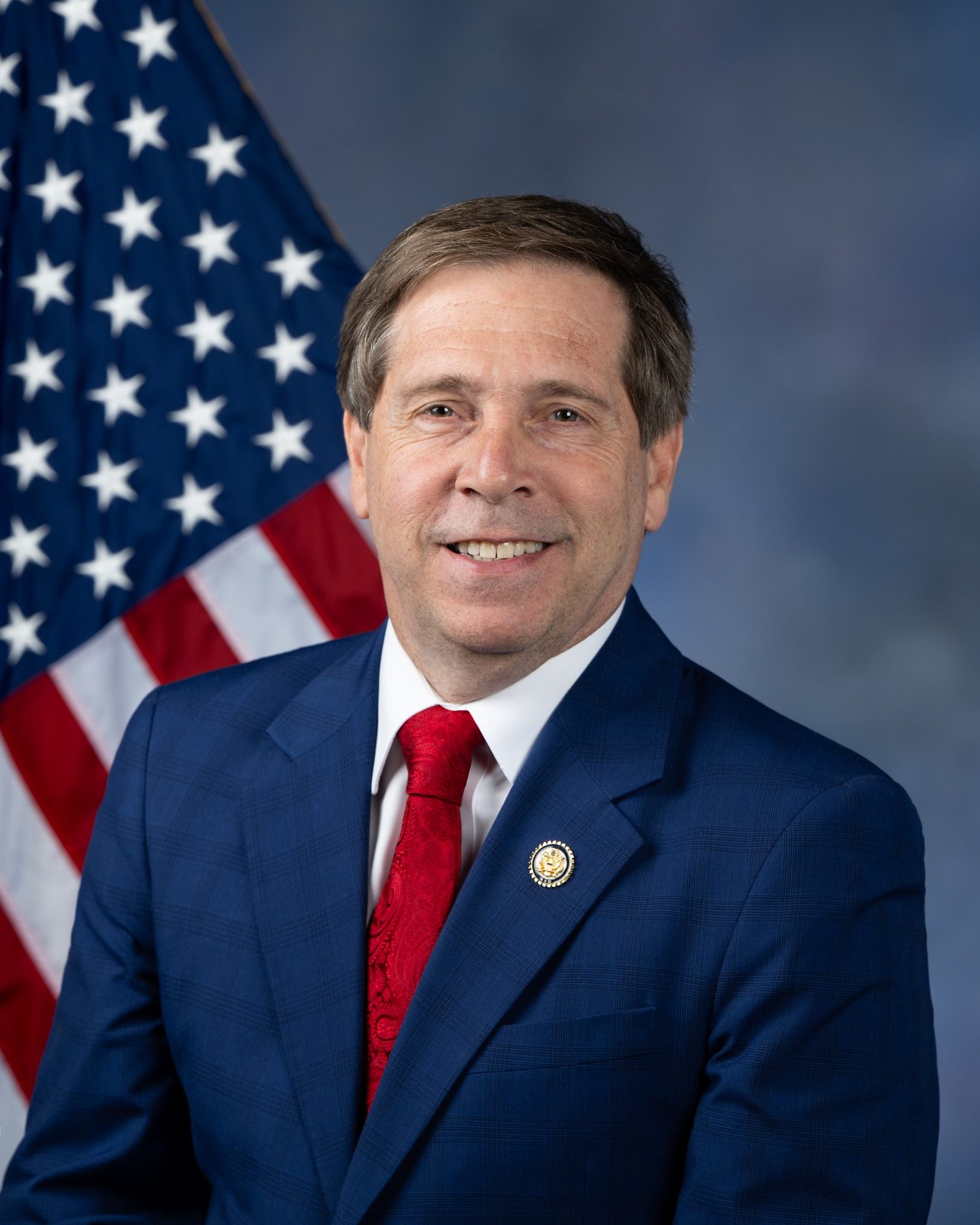
- Official portrait, 2025

Member of the U.S. House of Representatives from Tennessee's 3rd district
- Incumbent
- Assumed office January 3, 2011
- Preceded by: Zach Wamp

Personal details
- Born: Charles Joseph Fleischmann; October 11, 1962 (age 64) New York City, New York, U.S.
- Party: Republican
- Spouse: Brenda Fleischmann (m. 1986)
- Children: 3
- Education: University of Illinois, Urbana-Champaign (BA); University of Tennessee (JD)
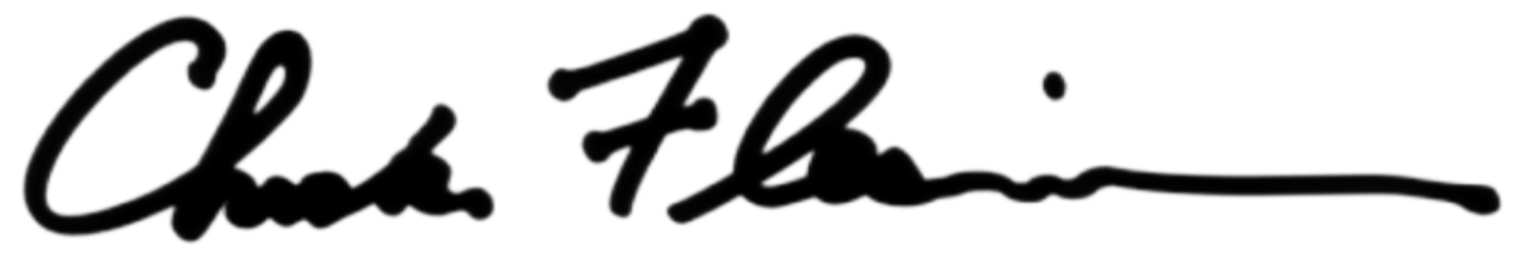
- Signature
- Website: House website Campaign website
- Fleischmann's voice Fleischmann introducing the FY2024 appropriations bill for energy, water, and related agencies. Recorded October 25, 2023

Charles Joseph Fleischmann (/ˈflaɪʃmən/ FLYSHE-mən; born October 11, 1962) is an American attorney and politician who has been the U.S. representative for Tennessee's 3rd congressional district since 2011. The district is based in Chattanooga and includes a large part of East Tennessee, including Oak Ridge. He is a member of the Republican Party.

== Early life, education, and law career ==
Fleischmann was born in Manhattan, New York City, and is a resident of Ooltewah, an unincorporated suburban community east of Chattanooga. He is the son of Rose Marie (née Salvo) and Max Fleischmann, Jr. Fleischmann is of Italian, English, and Austro-Hungarian descent, with some Jewish heritage on his grandfather’s side, and is a distant relative of Harry Houdini.

Fleischmann graduated from Elk Grove High School in Elk Grove Village, Illinois. He received a Bachelor of Arts degree in political science at the University of Illinois at Urbana–Champaign. He received both Phi Beta Kappa and magna cum laude honors. He then earned a Juris Doctor from the University of Tennessee College of Law in Knoxville. He was the first member of his family to attend college.

== Early career ==
After graduating from law school, Fleischmann moved to Chattanooga, Tennessee, and founded an independent law firm, Fleischmann and Fleischmann, in 1987. He is a former president of the Chattanooga Bar Association and former chair of the Chattanooga Lawyers Pro Bono Committee.

== U.S. House of Representatives ==
=== Elections ===
2010

Republican incumbent Zach Wamp retired in order to run for governor, leaving this an open seat. Fleischmann entered an 11-way Republican primary—the real contest in this heavily Republican district. None of the candidates had ever run for elected office before. Fleischmann's biggest competition came from former state GOP chair Robin Smith, who was considered the front-runner. She was endorsed by former speaker of the U.S. House Newt Gingrich and the Club for Growth. Fleischmann won the primary with a plurality of 30% of the vote, defeating Smith by 1,415 votes. He won most of the counties in the district, which were mostly in the northern part of the district, while Smith won three counties: Rhea, Hamilton (home to Chattanooga), and Polk counties. Third-place finisher Tim Gobble won only Bradley County, his home county.

Fleischmann's Democratic opponent in the general election was John Wolfe, a fellow attorney. Fleischmann had faced Wolfe in his first case as an attorney. He said he won that case and the appeal "and now I want to defeat him a third time." His other opponent was independent candidate Savas Kyriakidis, an attorney, restaurant owner and Iraq War veteran. Fleischmann won the race with 57% of the vote.

2012

In his first reelection campaign, Fleischmann defeated Scottie Mayfield and Weston Wamp in the Republican primary, 39%-31%-29%. He defeated Democratic nominee Mary Headrick in the general election with a large majority of the vote.

2014

On November 4, 2014, Fleischmann defeated Headrick again with 62.3% of the vote.

2016

On November 8, 2016, Fleischmann defeated Democrat Melody Shekari and independent Rick Tyler with 66.4% of the vote.

2018

On November 6, 2018, Fleischmann defeated Democrat Danielle Mitchell and independent Rick Tyler with 63.7% of the vote.

2020

On November 3, 2020, Fleischmann defeated Democrat Meg Gorman with 67.3% of the vote.

2022

On November 8, 2022, Fleischmann defeated Democrat Meg Gorman with 68.4% of the vote.

2024

On November 5, 2024, Fleischmann defeated Democrat Jack Allen with 67.5% of the vote.

=== Tenure ===
In October 2021, Business Insider reported that Fleischmann had violated the Stop Trading on Congressional Knowledge (STOCK) Act of 2012, a federal transparency and conflict-of-interest law, by failing to properly disclose the purchase of stock in DraftKings Inc. and the sale of stock in Zimmer Biomet, each worth up to $15,000.

In July 2024, the Chattanooga Times Free Press reported that Fleischmann declined to attend a town hall debate with opponents Jack Allen (D) and Stephen King (I). The article further mentioned that Fleischmann had not debated an opponent since October of 2014, when he debated Mary Headrick (D). Later, in September of 2025, Fleischmann said he intends to "never" host a town hall.

=== Political positions ===
Fleischmann tends to vote conservative. The conservative policy advocacy organization, Heritage Action, gave Fleischmann a lifetime score of 74 percent. The conservative and libertarian advocacy group, FreedomWorks, gave him a lifetime score of 70.6 percent. The largest federation of unions in the United States, the AFL-CIO, gave Fleischmann a lifetime score of 12 percent.

==== Economy ====
In July 2011, Fleischmann originally supported Speaker John Boehner's debt limit bill, but voted against the final debt ceiling agreement.

In November 2011, Fleischmann filed a new bill, the Stop Green Initiative Abuse Act of 2011, which would repeal the Department of Energy's Weatherization Assistance Program. This program attempts to assist low-income families in lowering their energy bills by adding energy-efficient caulking and insulation to homes. A December 2010 Tennessee Comptroller's Office report concluded that funds for the program had been "wasted or misspent". Fleischmann's office estimated that if this bill passed it would save taxpayers $2.1 billion over the next decade. This was the third bill he proposed.

Fleischmann supports the use of nuclear power. His district contains the Sequoyah Nuclear Plant. He is the head of the House Nuclear Cleanup Caucus. In 2024, Fleischmann proposed new funding from the Department of Energy to develop advanced nuclear energy projects, including small modular reactors.

==== Election laws ====
In December 2020, Fleischmann was one of 126 Republican members of the House of Representatives to sign an amicus brief in support of Texas v. Pennsylvania, a lawsuit filed at the United States Supreme Court contesting the results of the 2020 presidential election, in which Joe Biden defeated incumbent Donald Trump. The Supreme Court declined to hear the case on the basis that Texas lacked standing under Article III of the Constitution to challenge the results of an election held by another state.

House speaker Nancy Pelosi issued a statement that called signing the amicus brief an act of "election subversion." She also reprimanded Fleischmann and the other House members who supported the lawsuit: "The 126 Republican Members that signed onto this lawsuit brought dishonor to the House. Instead of upholding their oath to support and defend the Constitution, they chose to subvert the Constitution and undermine public trust in our sacred democratic institutions." New Jersey representative Bill Pascrell, citing section three of the 14th Amendment, called for Pelosi to not seat Fleischmann and the other Republicans who signed the brief supporting the suit, arguing that "the text of the 14th Amendment expressly forbids Members of Congress from engaging in rebellion against the United States. Trying to overturn a democratic election and install a dictator seems like a pretty clear example of that."

==== Foreign policy ====
Fleischmann voted to provide Israel with support following the 2023 Hamas attack on Israel. When asked about Palestinian deaths from the ongoing Gaza war, Fleischmann said "I will always support Israel, and you can tell the Palestinians I will never support them." Fleischmann denied Israel is committing a genocide against the Palestinians.

Fleischmann supports sending United States aid to Ukraine.

==== Government speech ====
Fleischmann was one of 120 Republicans who voted against removing Confederate statues from inside the Capitol building.

On November 16, 2011, Fleischmann voted for a bill that encourages the display of "In God We Trust" in public buildings and schools and reinforces it as the motto of the United States.

==== Gun rights ====
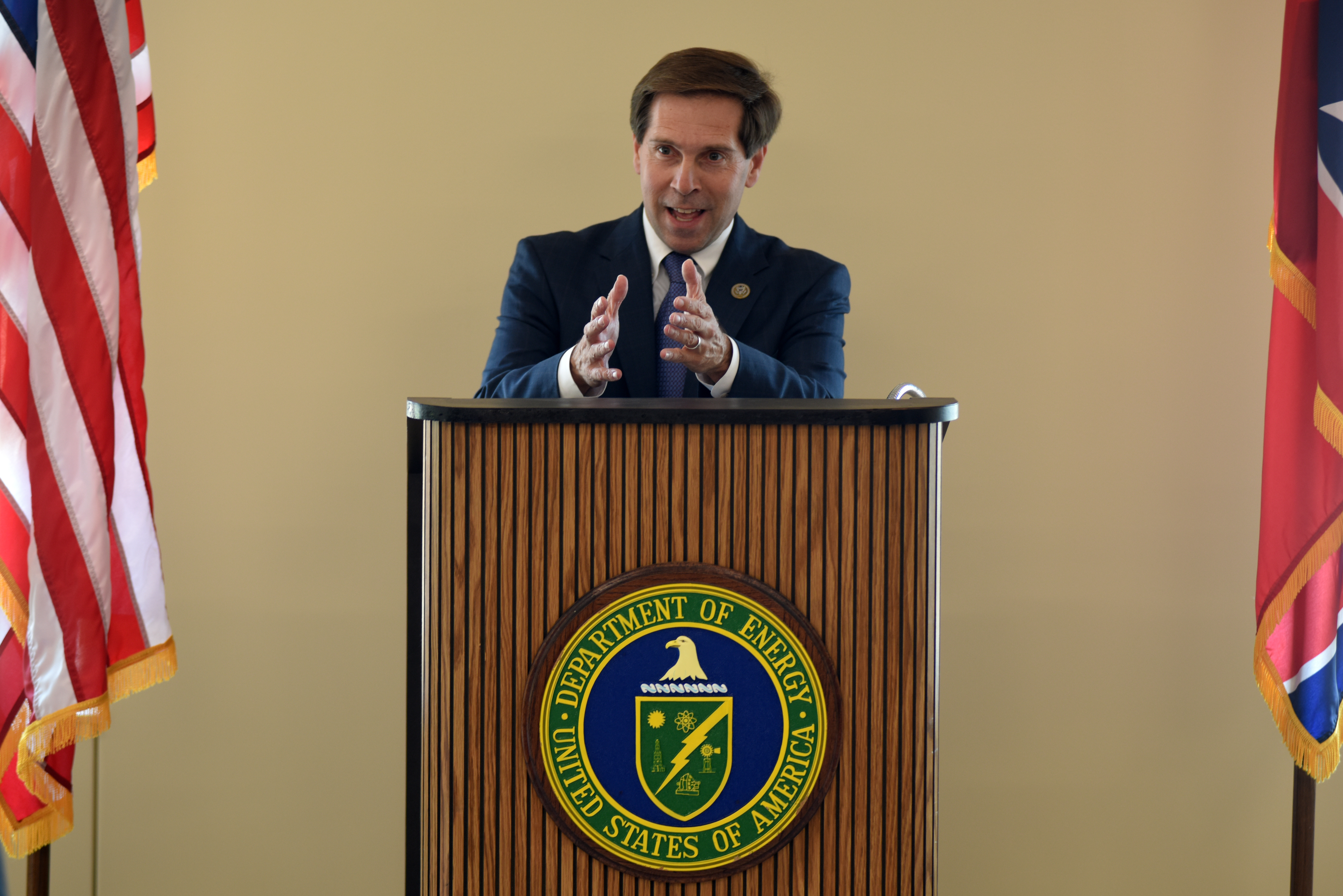
Fleischmann in 2017

Fleischmann has been a firm opponent of gun control. He has received an "A" rating from the interest groups "National Rifle Association Political Fund Positions on Gun Rights" and "Gun Owners of America Positions on Gun Rights". He supports legislation that "allows licensed firearm owners to carry out their God-given right more freely" because "the right to carry a firearm is a right that allows law-abiding citizens to protect themselves and is crucial to the freedom of our country." On November 16, 2011, Fleischmann voted for the National Right-to-Carry Reciprocity Act of 2011, which would allow a resident of a state that allows concealed carry to possess a firearm while visiting another state that has different firearm laws.

==== Health care ====
Fleischmann's first vote in office was for the 2011 motion Repealing the Health Care Bill.

==== Spending ====
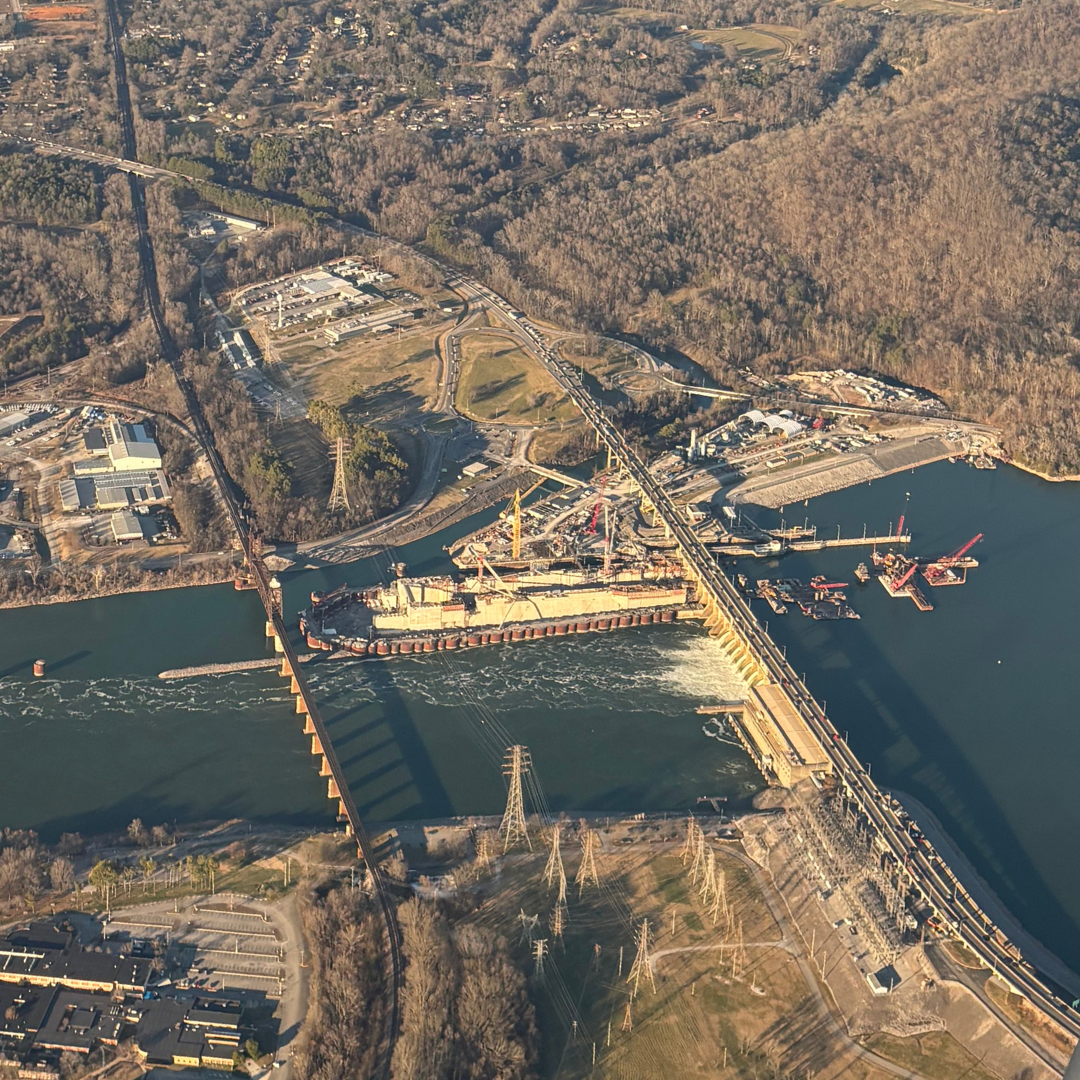
Chickamauga Lock Replacement Project

In 2023 Fleischmann led the US Congress in self-appointed earmark spending, securing $273.3 million for his district out of the 2024 federal budget. The majority of this spending is destined for the lock replacement project on the Chickamauga Dam, which is the single highest-cost project in the country in the 2024 budget.

=== Committee assignments ===
For the 119th Congress:

- Committee on Appropriations
  - Subcommittee on Defense
  - Subcommittee on Energy and Water Development and Related Agencies (Chair)
  - Subcommittee on Labor, Health and Human Services, Education, and Related Agencies
- Committee on Science, Space, and Technology
  - Subcommittee on Energy

=== Caucus memberships ===
- United States Congressional International Conservation Caucus
- U.S.-Japan Caucus
- Republican Study Committee
- Congressional Taiwan Caucus
- Congressional Western Caucus

== Electoral history ==
Year	Office	District	Democratic		Republican		Other	
2010	U.S. House of Representatives	Tennessee's 3rd district	John Wolfe	28.01%	Chuck Fleischmann	56.79%	Savas T. Kyriakidis (Ind.)	10.54%
2012	U.S. House of Representatives	Tennessee's 3rd district	Mary M. Headrick	35.46%	Chuck Fleischmann	61.45%	Matthew Deniston (Ind.)	3.1%
2014	U.S. House of Representatives	Tennessee's 3rd district	Mary M. Headrick	34.58%	Chuck Fleischmann	62.36%	Cassandra J Mitchell (Ind.)	3.1%
2016	U.S. House of Representatives	Tennessee's 3rd district	Melody Shekari	28.85%	Chuck Fleischmann	66.39%	Rick Tyler (Ind.)	1.9%
2018	U.S. House of Representatives	Tennessee's 3rd district	Danielle Mitchell	34.48%	Chuck Fleischmann	63.68%	Rick Tyler (Ind.)	1.84%
2020	U.S. House of Representatives	Tennessee's 3rd district	Meg Gorman	30.3%	Chuck Fleischmann	67.3%	Amber Hysell (Ind.)	1.57%
2022	U.S. House of Representatives	Tennessee's 3rd district	Meg Gorman	30.19%	Chuck Fleischmann	68.38%	Rick Tyler (Ind.)	0.87%
2024	U.S. House of Representatives	Tennessee's 3rd district	Jack Allen	29.36%	Chuck Fleischmann	67.50%	Stephen King (Ind.)	1.68%

== Personal life ==
Fleischmann is married to Brenda M. Fleischmann. They have three sons, and live in Ooltewah. Fleischmann is 5' 4" tall. Fleischmann is a Roman Catholic.

U.S. House of Representatives
Preceded by Zach Wamp	Member of the U.S. House of Representatives from Tennessee's 3rd congressional district 2011–present	Incumbent
U.S. order of precedence (ceremonial)
Preceded by Scott DesJarlais	United States representatives by seniority 80th	Succeeded by Paul Gosar
