= 2014 United States Senate election in Tennessee =

- November 4, 2014
- Turnout: 35.97% ▼30.37 pp
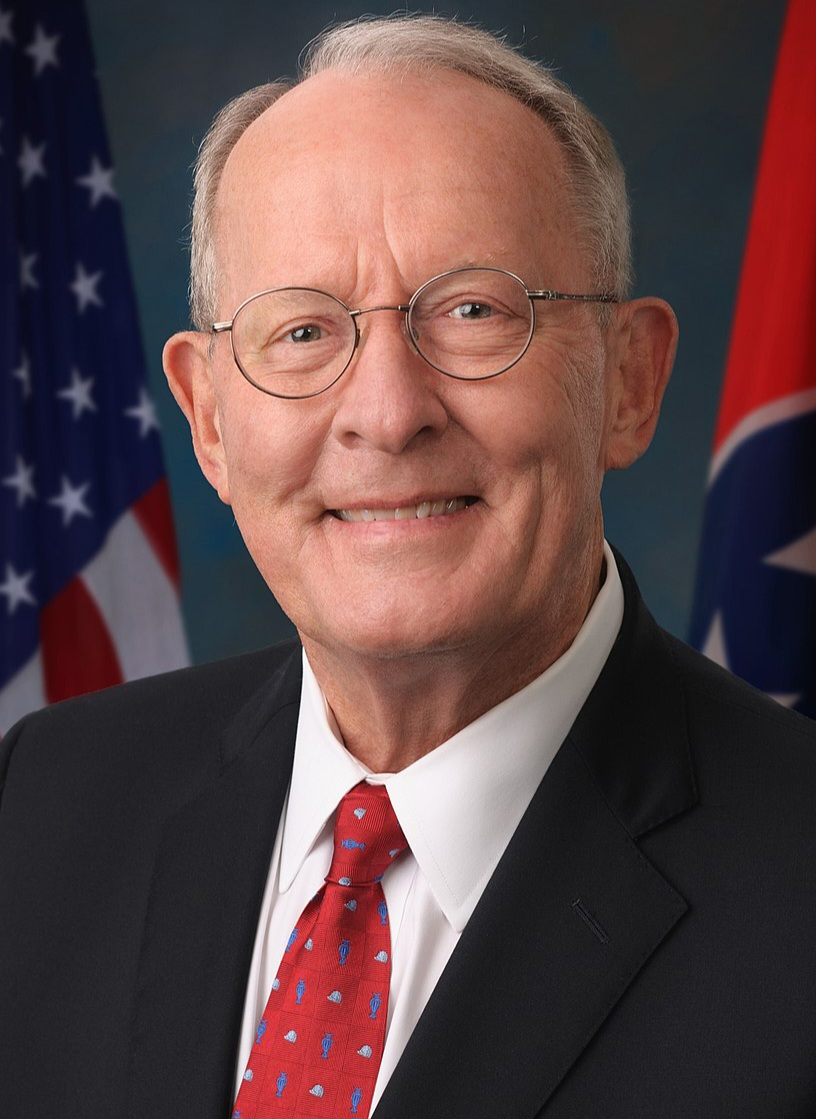

Nominee	Lamar Alexander	Gordon Ball
Party	Republican	Democratic
Popular vote	850,087	437,848
Percentage	61.87%	31.87%
- Alexander: 40–50% 50–60% 60–70% 70–80% Ball: 40–50% 50–60% 60–70%
U.S. senator before election
Lamar Alexander
Republican
Elected U.S. Senator
Lamar Alexander
Republican

The 2014 United States Senate election in Tennessee took place on November 4, 2014, to elect a member of the United States Senate from the State of Tennessee. Incumbent Republican U.S. Senator Lamar Alexander defeated Democrat Gordon Ball, and was re-elected to a third term in office with 61.9% of the vote against 31.9%.

Lamar Alexander narrowly kept Shelby County in his column. Home to Memphis, Shelby County had not voted Republican on a presidential level since 1988. Notably, Alexander flipped reliably Democratic Haywood County which had not voted Republican on a presidential level since 1972, but had been trending Republican in recent years. However, he did lose Davidson County, a county which he narrowly flipped back in 2008. This county is home to Tennessee's capital, Nashville.

== Background ==
Lamar Alexander was reelected with 65.1% of the vote in the 2008 election. He stepped down from his leadership role as Republican Conference Chairman of the United States Senate in 2011, but announced that he would seek re-election to a third term. Nashville businessman, counseling executive and former 2012 U.S. Senate candidate Larry Crim filed his announcement of candidacy with the Secretary of the United States Senate in January 2013.

== Republican primary ==
Although Alexander was initially thought to be vulnerable to a primary challenge from the right, he worked to avoid this and ultimately did not face a high-profile challenger. He declared his intention to run early, quickly won the endorsement of Governor Bill Haslam, every living former Tennessee Republican Party Chairman and the state's entire Republican congressional delegation (except scandal-hit Scott DesJarlais). He also raised a large amount of money and worked to avoid the mistakes of ousted Senators Bob Bennett and Richard Lugar by trying to stay in touch with his constituents, especially in East Tennessee. Moreover, out-of-state conservative organizations such as the Senate Conservatives Fund made little effort to defeat Alexander.

During his re-election campaign in 2008, Alexander faced no opponents in the Republican primary. As early as July 2013, it was obvious that the same would not be true in 2014. The weekend of July 20, 2013, a rally was held in Smyrna in opposition to Alexander. Activists attending the event included Williamson County GOP leader Kevin Kookogey. By mid-August, Triton Polling released a poll showing Alexander trailing "a generic conservative" by 4.6 points. But no "generic conservative" seemed to want to step up. In search of a candidate, a "Beat Lamar" PAC held a forum and invited Kookogey, Knox County mayor Tim Burchett, and Alexander's only formal opponent at the time, Brenda Lenard of Knoxville.

On August 20, 2013, State Representative Joe Carr announced his candidacy. He had previously been opposing Scott Desjarlais in the race for Tennessee's 4th congressional district, but swapped races under public pressure. Kookogey soon dropped out of the race. Four candidates were then vetted in September by the "Coalition for a Constitutional Senate": Carr, truck driver Jerry Davis, business owner John McDaniel, and electrician Danny Page. The coalition ultimately endorsed Carr with 59% of the vote, but some felt that Carr's nomination was coerced by the leaders of the Beat Lamar PAC. Independent candidate Danny Page was especially vocal on that issue.

Entering the race late was George Flinn, a radiologist from Memphis who had run for Congress against Steve Cohen in 2012. There was some speculation that Flinn was a spoiler deployed by Alexander to steal Tea Party votes from Carr.

In the primary's final stretch Carr was endorsed by Sarah Palin, but he did not receive much other support from outside of Tennessee, failing to receive endorsements from the Senate Conservatives Fund or the Club for Growth.

Ultimately, Alexander won the primary, though he recorded the lowest winning percentage (49.7%) and lowest margin of victory (9.2 points) ever in a primary for a Republican U.S. Senator from Tennessee. Carr won a larger percentage of the vote (40.5%) than the previous 11 challengers to sitting Republican U.S. Senators in Tennessee history combined (40.3%).

=== Candidates ===
==== Declared ====
- Christian Agnew
- Lamar Alexander, incumbent U.S. Senator
- Joe Carr, state representative
- George Flinn, radiologist, radio station owner, former Shelby County Commissioner and nominee for Tennessee's 9th congressional district in 2012
- John King, businessman
- Brenda Lenard, doctoral student at the University of Tennessee and candidate for the U.S. Senate in 2012
- Erin Kent Magee

==== Withdrew ====
- Danny Page, electrician (running as an independent)

==== Declined ====
- Diane Black, U.S. Representative
- Marsha Blackburn, U.S. Representative
- Tim Burchett, Mayor of Knox County
- Stacey Campfield, state senator
- Jimmy Duncan, U.S. Representative
- Stephen Fincher, U.S. Representative
- Chuck Fleischmann, U.S. Representative
- Mark Green, state senator
- Glenn Jacobs (Kane), professional wrestler
- Kevin Kookogey, former chairman of the Williamson County Republican Party
- Monty Lankford, businessman, board member of the Tennessee Family Action Council and nominee for Tennessee's 4th congressional district in 2008
- Ron Ramsey, Lieutenant Governor and Speaker of the Tennessee Senate
- Phil Roe, U.S. Representative

=== Endorsements ===
Lamar Alexander

Individuals

- Howard Baker, former Senate Majority Leader and former White House Chief of Staff
- Tom Beasley, former Chair of the Tennessee Republican Party
- Diane Black, U.S. Representative
- Marsha Blackburn, U.S. Representative
- Bill Brock, former U.S. Senator and former United States Secretary of Labor
- Jim Burnett, former Chair of the Tennessee Republican Party
- Chris Christie, Governor of New Jersey
- Bob Corker, U.S. Senator
- Bob Davis, Jr., former Chair of the Tennessee Republican Party
- Jimmy Duncan, U.S. Representative
- Winfield Dunn, former Governor of Tennessee
- Stephen Fincher, U.S. Representative
- Chuck Fleischmann, U.S. Representative
- Bill Frist, former Senate Majority Leader
- Beth Harwell, Speaker of the Tennessee House of Representatives and former Chair of the Tennessee Republican Party
- Bill Haslam, Governor of Tennessee
- Jim Henry, former Chair of the Tennessee Republican Party
- Tommy Hooper, former Chair of the Tennessee Republican Party
- Mike Huckabee, former Governor of Arkansas and candidate for President in 2008
- S.L. "Kopie" Kopald, Jr., former Chair of the Tennessee Republican Party
- Brad Martin, former Chair of the Tennessee Republican Party
- Brian L. Mason, candidate for State House 51
- Charles L. Overby, former Chair of the Tennessee Republican Party
- Ron Ramsey, Lieutenant Governor and Speaker of the Tennessee Senate
- Randle Richardson, former Chair of the Tennessee Republican Party
- Susan Richardson Williams, former Chair of the Tennessee Republican Party
- Phil Roe, U.S. Representative
- Chip Saltsman, former Chair of the Tennessee Republican Party
- Robin Smith, former Chair of the Tennessee Republican Party
- Don Sundquist, former Governor of Tennessee
- Fred Thompson, former U.S. Senator and candidate for President in 2008
Joe Carr

Individuals

- Sheila Butt (R-Columbia), Tennessee State Representative
- Michael DelGiorno & Ralph Bristol, radio hosts for WWTN in Nashville
- Laura Ingraham, author and conservative political commentator
- Judd Matheny (R-Tullahoma), Tennessee State Representative
- Sarah Palin, former Governor of Alaska and nominee for vice president in 2008
- Mark Pody (R-Lebanon), Tennessee State Representative
- Courtney Rogers (R-Goodlettsville), Tennessee State Representative
- Mike Sparks (R-Smyrna), Tennessee State Representative
- Billy Spivey (R-Lewisburg), Tennessee State Representative
- Rick Womick (R-Rockvale), Tennessee State Representative

Organizations

- Beat Lamar PAC
- Coalition for a Constitutional Senate
- Tea Party Nation

=== Polling ===
Poll source	Date(s) administered	Sample size	Margin of error	Lamar Alexander	Joe Carr	George Flinn	Brenda Lenard	Danny Page	Other	Undecided
North Star Opinion Research*	August 19–22, 2013	600	± 4%	64%	22%	—	—	—	—	14%
North Star Opinion Research*	August 19–22, 2013	600	± 4%	69%	—	—	16%	—	—	15%
Public Policy Polling^	December 2–3, 2013	391	± 5%	46%	40%	—	—	—	—	14%
MTSU	January 23–26, 2014	?	± ?	40%	7%	—	—	—	4%	49%
North Star Opinion Research*	February 3–6, 2014	600	± 4%	62%	17%	—	2%	1%	—	18%
North Star Opinion Research*	May 12–14, 2014	600	± 4%	56%	14%	—	1%	1%	—	22%
Tea Party Nation/Triton	May 22, 2014	1,100	± ?	44%	20%	—	—	—	9%	27%
Tea Party Nation/Triton	July 10–11, 2014	1,099	± 2.9%	43%	36%	—	—	—	—	21%
North Star Opinion Research*	July 20–22, 2014	600	± 4%	53%	21%	—	—	—	9%	15%
North Star Opinion Research*	July 27–29, 2014	600	± 4%	53%	24%	—	1%	1%	5%	16%
Red Racing Horses & PMI inc.	July 28–30, 2014	400	± 5%	41%	29%	5%	—	—	5%	20%

Poll source	Date(s) administered	Sample size	Margin of error	Lamar Alexander	Someone more conservative	Undecided
Triton Polling	August 15–16, 2013	680	± 3.7%	44.9%	49.5%	5.6%

- * Internal poll for Lamar Alexander campaign
- ^ Internal poll for Terry Adams campaign
Hypothetical polling

Poll source	Date(s) administered	Sample size	Margin of error	Lamar Alexander	Tim Burchett	Undecided
North Star Opinion Research	August 19–22, 2013	600	± 4%	62%	23%	15%

Poll source	Date(s) administered	Sample size	Margin of error	Lamar Alexander	Kevin Kookogey	Undecided
North Star Opinion Research	August 19–22, 2013	600	± 4%	69%	15%	16%

=== Results ===
Results by county: Alexander: 40–50%; 50–60%; 60–70%; Carr: 40–50%; 50–60%; 60–70%

Republican primary results
Party	Candidate	Votes	%
Republican	Lamar Alexander (incumbent)	331,705	49.65%
Republican	Joe Carr	271,324	40.61%
Republican	George Shea Flinn	34,668	5.19%
Republican	Christian Agnew	11,320	1.69%
Republican	Brenda S. Lenard	7,908	1.18%
Republican	John D. King	7,748	1.16%
Republican	Erin Kent Magee	3,366	0.52%
Total votes		668,039	100.00%

== Democratic primary ==
=== Declared ===
- Terry Adams, attorney
- Gordon Ball, attorney
- Larry Crim, candidate for the U.S. Senate in 2012
- Gary Gene Davis, perennial candidate

=== Withdrew ===
- Jacob Maurer, high school educator and write-in candidate for the U.S. Senate in 2012

=== Declined ===
- Phil Bredesen, former Governor of Tennessee
- Joe Brown, arbiter of the CBS television series Judge Joe Brown and former Shelby County Criminal Court judge
- Craig Fitzhugh, Minority Leader of the Tennessee House of Representatives
- Roy Herron, Chairman of the Tennessee Democratic Party, former state senator and nominee for Tennessee's 8th congressional district in 2010

=== Endorsements ===
Terry Adams

Public figures

- Charles Robert Bone, attorney and 2015 candidate for Mayor of Nashville
- Charles W. Bone, attorney and Democratic fundraiser
- Chase Cole, attorney and member of the Dean's Council of the Vanderbilt University School of Law
- Lincoln Davis, former U.S. Representative
- Lowe Finney, Tennessee State Senator
- Craig Fitzhugh, Tennessee State Representative
- Chip Forrester, former chair of the Tennessee Democratic Party
- Bill Freeman, businessman and potential candidate for Mayor of Nashville
- Doug Horne, former Tennessee Democratic Party Chairman and former candidate for Governor of Tennessee
- Jamie Isabel, former Nashville Metro Councilman
- Clark Jones, businessman and fundraiser
- Bill Mason, author, political consultant, and President of Tennessee Citizen Action
- Jerry Maynard II, Metro Councilman At-Large for Nashville
- Mike McWherter, Democratic nominee for Governor of Tennessee in 2010
- Doris Medlin, Tennessee Democratic Party Executive Committee Member and former Director of the Tennessee Commission on the Status of Women
- Olan Mills II, Chairman Emeritus of Olan Mills, Inc.
- Junaid Odubeko, commercial litigator and author
- Bob Tuke, former chair of the Tennessee Democratic Party and nominee for the U.S. Senate in 2008
- Mike Turner, state representative

Newspapers

- Chattanooga Times Free Press
- Knoxville News Sentinel
Gordon Ball
- A C Wharton, Mayor of Memphis
Larry Crim

Public figures

- Imogene Bolin, Esq., Attorney of Middle Tennessee and Professor Emeritus of Public Administration at Middle Tennessee State University
- Barbara Cooper, of Memphis, State Rep.
- Scott Davis, Metro Nashville Councilman
- Tim Mills, minister, author and U.S. Selective Service board member serving the Tennessee region
- Doug Pardue, Metro Nashville Councilman
- Chantho Sourinho, Commissioner of Rutherford County, Tennessee
- Reginald Tate, of Memphis, State Senator
- Tony Tenpenny, Metro Nashville Councilman

Newspapers

- Memphis Regional News
- The Nashvillian

=== Results ===
Results by county: Ball: 30–40%; 40–50%; 70–80%; Adams: 30–40%; 40–50%; 50–60%; Davis: 20–30%; 30–40%; 40–50%

Democratic primary results
Party	Candidate	Votes	%
Democratic	Gordon Ball	87,829	36.45%
Democratic	Terry Adams	85,794	35.61%
Democratic	Gary Gene Davis	42,549	17.66%
Democratic	Larry Crim	24,777	10.28%
Total votes		240,949	100.00%

== General election ==
=== Candidates ===
- Lamar Alexander (Republican), incumbent U.S. Senator
- Gordon Ball (Democratic), attorney
- Tom Emerson Jr. (independent)
- Edmund Gauthier (independent)
- Joshua James (independent)
- Danny Page (independent), electrician
- Bartholomew Phillips (independent)
- Martin Pleasant (Green)
- C. Salekin (independent)
- Eric Schecter (independent)
- Rick Tyler (independent)
- Joe Wilmoth (Constitution), candidate for the state senate in 2010

=== Endorsements ===
Lamar Alexander (R)

Tennessee State Government

- Beth Harwell, Speaker of the Tennessee House of Representatives and former Chair of the Tennessee Republican Party
- Bill Haslam, Governor of Tennessee
- Joey Hensley, state senator (R- Hohenwald)
- Matthew Hill, state representative (R- Jonesborough)
- Timothy Hill, state representative (R- Blountville)
- Andy Holt, state representative (R- Dresden)
- Brian L. Mason, candidate for State House
- Frank Niceley, state senator(R- Strawberry Plains)
- Mark Pody, state representative (R- Lebanon)
- Ron Ramsey, lieutenant governor and Speaker of the Tennessee Senate
- Bill Sanderson, state representative (R- Kenton)
- Mike Sparks, state representative (R- Smyrna)
- Billy Spivey, state representative (R- Lewisburg)
- Tim Wirgau, state representative (R- Buchanan)
- Rick Womick, state representative (R- Rockvale)

Members of US Congress

- Diane Black, U.S. Representative
- Marsha Blackburn, U.S. Representative
- Bob Corker, U.S. Senator
- Jimmy Duncan, U.S. Representative
- Stephen Fincher, U.S. Representative
- Chuck Fleischmann, U.S. Representative
- Angus King, U.S. Senator (I-ME)
- Phil Roe, U.S. Representative

Former Tennessee officials

- Tom Beasley, former Chair of the Tennessee Republican Party
- Bill Brock, former U.S. Senator and former United States Secretary of Labor
- Jim Burnett, former Chair of the Tennessee Republican Party
- Bob Davis, Jr., former Chair of the Tennessee Republican Party
- Winfield Dunn, former Governor of Tennessee
- Bill Frist, former Senate Majority Leader
- Jim Henry, former Chair of the Tennessee Republican Party
- Tommy Hooper, former Chair of the Tennessee Republican Party
- S.L. "Kopie" Kopald, Jr., former Chair of the Tennessee Republican Party
- Brad Martin, former Chair of the Tennessee Republican Party
- Charles L. Overby, former Chair of the Tennessee Republican Party
- Randle Richardson, former Chair of the Tennessee Republican Party
- Susan Richardson Williams, former Chair of the Tennessee Republican Party
- Chip Saltsman, former Chair of the Tennessee Republican Party
- Robin Smith, former Chair of the Tennessee Republican Party
- Don Sundquist, former Governor of Tennessee
- Fred Thompson, former U.S. Senator and candidate for President in 2008

U.S. governors

- Chris Christie, Governor of New Jersey
- Mike Huckabee, former Governor of Arkansas and candidate for president in 2008
Gordon Ball (D)
- Jim Cooper, U.S. Representative
- Brenda Gilmore, State representative
- Sherry Jones, State representative
- Diane Neighbors, Vice Mayor of Nashville
- Jason Powell, State representative
- Mike Stewart, State representative
- A C Wharton, Mayor of Memphis
Danny Page (I)

Individuals

- Jacob Brimm, former candidate for US Congress 2014– Tennessee's 7th district
- Mark "Coonrippy" Brown, Republican candidate for Governor of Tennessee in 2014
- Mary Cook, leader of the Smokey Mountain Tea Party
- June Griffin, US Senate candidate in 2002, leader of Rhea County Tea Party
- John D. King, former candidate for Republican nomination US Senate 2014
- Brenda Lenard, former candidate for Republican nomination US Senate 2014 & 2012
- Erin Kent Magee, former candidate for Republican nomination US Senate 2014
- Kay White, leader of Tri-Cities Tea Party

Other

- Libertycandidates.com

=== Debates ===
The first debate was held in Chattanooga, sponsored by Democrats United For Tennessee Inc. and Central Labor Council Members which included 15 candidates for state and federal office, attended by Larry Crim for U.S. Senate. Crim criticized Senators Bob Corker of Chattanooga and Lamar Alexander of Nashville for overreaching into the free enterprise of VW and their works councils, which Crim stated also implicated free association rights of the company, workers and labor and the free vote. U.S. Senate candidate Larry Crim and UAW International Rep. Tom Savage spoke on the importance of free elections at the Volkswagen plant in Chattanooga at the debate. The debate and forum were held at the Kingdom Center of Olivet Baptist Church.

Crim said, "Protecting voter rights for a free and fair election are as fundamental to expressing the will of workers in the workplace as it is to Americans at the polling place... For a U.S. Senator to offer incentives or threaten withdrawing public resources based on whether workers vote to recognize the union interferes with their free choice," continued the Democratic candidate for United States Senate. "It seems clear that there was an overreach here and I stand with labor on that," said Crim.

The second debate was held in Bolivar and attended by Democrats Gordon Ball and Terry Adams, Republican George Flinn, and independents Ed Gauthier and Danny Page. The attendees criticized Alexander and Carr for not attending.

The third was a "candidates' forum" after the primary in Cookeville on October 16. Only Republican nominee Lamar Alexander and Democratic nominee Gordon Ball were allowed to participate.

The fourth debate was on October 23 at a Sheraton Hotel across from the Tennessee State Capitol in Nashville. The nominees for the Democratic Party (Gordon Ball), Libertarian Party (Joshua James), Green Party (Martin Pleasant), and Constitution Party (Joe Wilmoth) were all in attendance, as well as independents Tom Emerson, Ed Gauthier, and Danny Page. The moderator was blogger Tom Humphrey of the blog "Humphrey on the Hill". The candidates discussed a number of issues, including abortion, the Islamic State, Common Core education standards, and global warming, but the issue that stuck most with the media was marijuana. There was a general consensus among the seven candidates in attendance that the federal government should not be involved in the issue, and that authority on marijuana should be reserved to the states and people. Incumbent senator Lamar Alexander declined to participate in the debate, and was mocked by Democrat Gordon Ball as being "chicken". Alexander was speaking in front of various groups in Nashville and Murfreesboro that day.

The fifth and sixth debates were held in Johnson City and Crossville, and featured candidates Gordon Ball and Danny Page. Senator Alexander was invited, but attended neither.

=== Campaign ===
In September, an education summit was held in Nashville by Governor Bill Haslam. A protest of the summit (which was largely a protest of the "Common Core" standards) was attended by Democrat Gordon Ball and independent Danny Page.

In late September, eleven members of the Tennessee General Assembly who had backed Joe Carr in the primaries announced they would back Alexander in the general election, saying, "We feel that it is vitally important to the country that we stand together and support replacing the liberal agenda that is now in control of the United States Senate". Carr himself abstained from the endorsement.

=== Predictions ===
Source	Ranking	As of
The Cook Political Report	Solid R	November 3, 2014
Sabato's Crystal Ball	Safe R	November 3, 2014
Rothenberg Political Report	Safe R	November 3, 2014
Real Clear Politics	Safe R	November 3, 2014

=== Polling ===
Poll source	Date(s) administered	Sample size	Margin of error	Lamar Alexander (R)	Gordon Ball (D)	Other	Undecided
Rasmussen Reports	April 29–30, 2014	750	± 4%	51%	25%	10%	15%
CBS News/New York Times	July 5–24, 2014	1,465	± 5.4%	48%	33%	14%	5%
Rasmussen Reports	August 11–12, 2014	750	± 4%	47%	32%	10%	12%
CBS News/NYT/YouGov	August 18 – September 2, 2014	1,056	± 4%	47%	32%	10%	11%
CBS News/NYT/YouGov	September 20 – October 1, 2014	1,007	± 4%	53%	32%	2%	12%
CBS News/NYT/YouGov	October 16–23, 2014	974	± 5%	55%	33%	2%	10%

Hypothetical polling

With Adams

Poll source	Date(s) administered	Sample size	Margin of error	Lamar Alexander (R)	Terry Adams (D)	Other	Undecided
Public Policy Polling ^	December 2–3, 2013	531	± 4.3%	45%	32%	—	23%
Rasmussen Reports	April 29–30, 2014	750	± 4%	50%	26%	10%	15%
CBS News/New York Times	July 5–24, 2014	1,465	± 5.4%	48%	35%	7%	10%

- ^ Internal poll for Terry Adams campaign

=== Results ===
County flips: Democratic Flip / Republican Hold Flip

2014 United States Senate election in Tennessee
Party	Candidate	Votes	%	±%
Republican	Lamar Alexander (incumbent)	850,087	61.87%	−3.27%
Democratic	Gordon Ball	437,848	31.87%	+0.23%
Constitution	Joe Wilmoth	36,088	2.63%	N/A
Green	Martin Pleasant	12,570	0.91%	N/A
Independent	Tom Emerson, Jr.	11,157	0.81%	N/A
Independent	Danny Page	7,713	0.56%	N/A
Independent	Rick Tyler	5,759	0.42%	N/A
Independent	Joshua James	5,678	0.41%	N/A
Independent	Bartholomew J. Phillips	2,386	0.17%	N/A
Independent	Edmund L. Gauthier	2,314	0.17%	N/A
Independent	Eric Schechter	1,673	0.12%	N/A
Independent	Choudhury Salekin	787	0.06%	N/A
Write-in		5	0.00%	N/A
Total votes		1,374,065	100.00%	N/A
Republican hold				

=== By county ===
County	Lamar Alexander Republican		Gordon Ball Democratic		Others Ind/Cons/Green		Margin	Total votes
County	%	#	%	#	%	#	Margin	Total votes
Anderson	64.53%	11,612	29.24%	5,262	6.22%	1,120	6,350	17,994
Bedford	66.68%	5,044	26.38%	1,995	6.94%	525	3,049	7,564
Benton	58.89%	2,202	34.58%	1,293	6.53%	244	909	3,739
Bledsoe	69.45%	1,812	24.34%	635	6.21%	162	1,177	2,609
Blount	68.84%	20,560	23.97%	7,160	7.19%	2,148	13,400	29,868
Bradley	78.87%	16,137	16.02%	3,277	5.11%	1,045	12,860	20,459
Campbell	70.46%	4,522	24.14%	1,549	5.41%	347	2,973	6,418
Cannon	62.36%	1,771	29.08%	826	8.56%	243	945	2,840
Carroll	65.61%	4,091	26.90%	1,677	7.49%	467	2,414	6,235
Carter	73.54%	7,983	18.91%	2,053	7.55%	820	5,930	10,856
Cheatham	64.32%	5,542	27.46%	2,366	8.22%	708	3,176	8,616
Chester	70.74%	2,408	18.98%	646	10.28%	350	1,762	3,404
Claiborne	69.32%	3,695	24.88%	1,326	5.80%	309	2,369	5,330
Clay	61.61%	905	31.86%	468	6.54%	96	437	1,469
Cocke	60.08%	4,391	34.19%	2,499	5.73%	419	1,892	7,309
Coffee	65.48%	7,414	26.82%	3,037	7.70%	872	4,377	11,323
Crockett	67.97%	1,980	25.30%	737	6.73%	196	1,243	2,913
Cumberland	69.74%	11,439	22.78%	3,737	7.48%	1,227	7,702	16,403
Davidson	43.76%	59,972	50.83%	69,665	5.41%	7,417	-9,693	137,054
Decatur	63.32%	1,450	30.26%	693	6.42%	147	757	2,290
DeKalb	59.61%	2,165	32.79%	1,191	7.60%	276	974	3,632
Dickson	61.27%	6,282	30.97%	3,175	7.76%	796	3,107	10,253
Dyer	69.53%	5,093	21.49%	1,574	8.98%	658	3,519	7,325
Fayette	70.28%	7,402	23.90%	2,517	5.82%	613	4,885	10,532
Fentress	69.02%	2,250	22.82%	744	8.16%	266	1,506	3,260
Franklin	62.07%	5,889	31.60%	2,998	6.33%	601	2,891	9,488
Gibson	64.68%	7,235	25.26%	2,825	10.06%	1,125	4,410	11,185
Giles	62.08%	3,474	30.56%	1,710	7.36%	412	1,764	5,596
Grainger	70.54%	2,950	23.60%	987	5.86%	245	1,963	4,182
Greene	71.49%	9,688	20.48%	2,775	8.03%	1,089	6,913	13,552
Grundy	57.74%	1,372	34.39%	817	7.87%	187	555	2,376
Hamblen	72.31%	8,157	22.02%	2,484	5.67%	639	5,673	11,280
Hamilton	64.22%	51,347	31.74%	25,373	4.04%	3,231	25,974	79,951
Hancock	69.30%	650	24.63%	231	6.07%	57	419	938
Hardeman	54.15%	2,623	41.14%	1,993	4.71%	228	630	4,844
Hardin	74.05%	3,803	20.58%	1,057	5.37%	276	2,746	5,136
Hawkins	72.74%	8,037	20.71%	2,288	6.55%	724	5,749	11,049
Haywood	50.85%	1,727	45.47%	1,544	3.68%	125	183	3,396
Henderson	71.49%	3,576	19.23%	962	9.28%	464	2,614	5,002
Henry	66.75%	4,816	27.28%	1,968	5.97%	431	2,848	7,215
Hickman	59.10%	2,584	31.72%	1,387	9.18%	401	1,197	4,372
Houston	52.93%	947	41.08%	735	5.99%	107	212	1,789
Humphreys	53.29%	2,227	37.35%	1,561	9.36%	391	666	4,179
Jackson	54.55%	1,326	34.47%	838	10.98%	267	488	2,431
Jefferson	70.26%	7,429	23.15%	2,448	6.59%	696	4,981	10,573
Johnson	73.96%	2,400	18.34%	595	7.70%	250	1,805	3,245
Knox	63.91%	66,093	29.78%	30,802	6.31%	6,527	35,291	103,422
Lake	53.18%	619	35.91%	418	10.91%	127	201	1,164
Lauderdale	59.77%	2,411	34.53%	1,393	5.70%	230	1,018	4,034
Lawrence	67.58%	5,888	26.47%	2,306	5.95%	518	3,582	8,712
Lewis	61.87%	1,655	27.51%	736	10.62%	284	919	2,675
Lincoln	72.43%	4,569	19.64%	1,239	7.93%	500	3,330	6,308
Loudon	73.53%	10,751	20.73%	3,031	5.74%	839	7,720	14,621
Macon	70.44%	2,312	22.09%	725	7.47%	245	1,587	3,282
Madison	58.49%	13,377	34.41%	7,871	7.10%	1,624	5,506	22,872
Marion	63.63%	3,963	31.60%	1,968	4.77%	297	1,995	6,228
Marshall	61.29%	3,650	31.87%	1,898	6.84%	407	1,752	5,955
Maury	61.17%	11,489	31.05%	5,831	7.78%	1,461	5,658	18,781
McMinn	73.20%	7,717	20.65%	2,177	6.15%	649	5,540	10,543
McNairy	69.04%	3,696	25.09%	1,343	5.87%	314	2,353	5,353
Meigs	69.71%	1,579	24.28%	550	6.01%	136	1,029	2,265
Monroe	69.00%	6,838	25.39%	2,516	5.61%	557	4,322	9,911
Montgomery	60.24%	17,561	33.35%	9,721	6.41%	1,868	7,840	29,150
Moore	67.84%	1,152	26.21%	445	5.95%	101	707	1,698
Morgan	66.52%	2,426	26.93%	982	6.55%	239	1,444	3,647
Obion	68.38%	4,631	22.15%	1,500	9.47%	641	3,131	6,772
Overton	58.42%	2,334	33.07%	1,321	8.51%	340	1,013	3,995
Perry	59.73%	838	31.86%	447	8.41%	118	391	1,403
Pickett	67.67%	1,105	26.09%	426	6.24%	102	679	1,633
Polk	67.63%	2,411	26.87%	958	5.50%	196	1,453	3,565
Putnam	61.35%	9,127	26.16%	3,892	12.49%	1,857	5,235	14,876
Rhea	77.11%	4,601	17.95%	1,071	4.94%	295	3,530	5,967
Roane	68.10%	9,194	25.75%	3,477	6.15%	830	5,717	13,501
Robertson	64.63%	9,028	26.85%	3,751	8.52%	1,189	5,277	13,968
Rutherford	61.65%	33,612	30.74%	16,761	7.61%	4,149	16,851	54,522
Scott	70.00%	2,143	24.66%	755	5.34%	164	1,388	3,062
Sequatchie	73.00%	2,258	21.07%	652	5.93%	184	1,606	3,094
Sevier	74.43%	14,073	19.18%	3,627	6.39%	1,208	10,446	18,908
Shelby	48.39%	90,415	47.59%	88,921	4.02%	7,512	1,494	186,848
Smith	59.58%	2,559	33.22%	1,427	7.20%	309	1,132	4,295
Stewart	60.74%	1,815	32.40%	968	6.86%	205	847	2,988
Sullivan	73.93%	24,425	18.90%	6,243	7.17%	2,371	18,182	33,039
Sumner	68.36%	25,615	24.80%	9,292	6.84%	2,565	16,323	37,472
Tipton	69.83%	8,550	23.07%	2,825	7.10%	869	5,725	12,244
Trousdale	55.66%	856	36.02%	554	8.32%	128	302	1,538
Unicoi	72.79%	2,876	19.21%	759	8.00%	316	2,117	3,951
Union	67.09%	2,016	26.42%	794	6.49%	195	1,222	3,005
Van Buren	57.89%	888	34.62%	712	7.49%	115	357	1,534
Warren	62.41%	4,761	30.83%	2,352	6.76%	515	2,409	7,628
Washington	68.72%	18,265	23.65%	6,286	7.63%	2,028	11,979	26,579
Wayne	73.88%	2,017	19.60%	535	6.52%	178	1,482	2,730
Weakley	67.54%	5,067	24.69%	1,852	7.77%	583	3,215	7,502
White	62.39%	3,721	28.14%	1,678	9.47%	565	2,043	5,964
Williamson	72.01%	42,501	21.45%	12,660	6.54%	3,857	29,841	59,018
Wilson	66.72%	20,260	26.03%	7,903	7.25%	2,201	12,357	30,364
Total	61.87%	850,087	31.87%	437,848	6.27%	86,130	412,239	1,374,065

==== Counties that flipped from Republican to Democratic ====
- Davidson (largest city: Nashville)

==== Counties that flipped from Democratic to Republican ====
- Haywood (largest city: Brownsville)

==== By congressional district ====
Alexander won seven of nine congressional districts.

District	Alexander	Ball	Representative
1st	72%	21%	Phil Roe
2nd	66%	27%	Jimmy Duncan
3rd	67%	28%	Chuck Fleischmann
4th	65%	28%	Scott DesJarlais
5th	46%	49%	Jim Cooper
6th	66%	26%	Diane Black
7th	66%	27%	Marsha Blackburn
8th	69%	25%	Stephen Fincher
9th	32%	64%	Steve Cohen

== See also ==
- 2014 Tennessee gubernatorial election
- 2014 Tennessee Amendment 1
- 2014 Tennessee elections
- 2014 United States elections
