= Form 1098-T =

IRS tax form

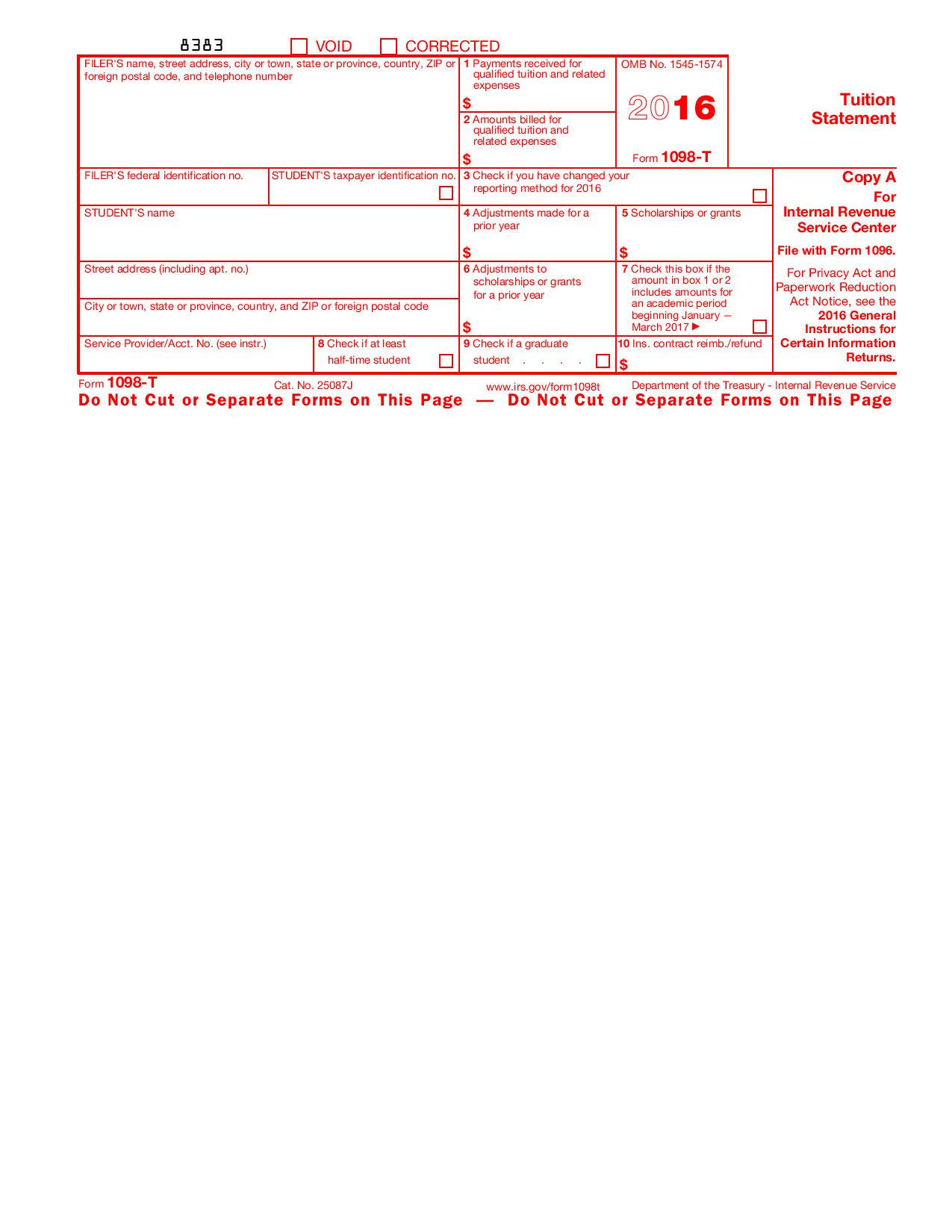
Form 1098-T for the 2016 tax year

Form 1098-T, Tuition Statement, is an American IRS tax form filed by eligible education institutions (or those filing on the institution's behalf) to report payments received and payments due from the paying student. The institution has to report a form for every student that is currently enrolled and paying qualifying tuition and related expenses.

Form 1098-T consists of one page, with a red copy to be filed with the IRS, and a black copy to be kept for records or to be sent to the student. There are ten lines that require the institution's tax information as well as the student's, tuition payments received and billed, as well as the scholarships granted to the student. There are lines for adjustments to a prior year's 1098-T, and a checkbox for whether the student is part-time or a graduate student.

== Filing requirements ==
=== Definitions ===
==== Eligible educational institution ====
An eligible educational institution is a college, university, vocational school, or other post-secondary educational institution. The requirements for eligibility are laid out in the Higher Education Act of 1965, in section 481:

- Only admits as students those who have received a certificate of graduation from a secondary school (e.g. a high school diploma, GED)
- Is legally authorized within its state to provide a postsecondary education
- Provides programs for:
  - A Bachelor's degree
  - An associate degree, with courses that can count as credit towards a bachelor's degree
  - Any other degree that can be acceptable to admission to a graduate or professional degree program
- Is a public or other nonprofit institution
- Is accredited (or in preaccreditation) by a nationally recognized accrediting agency or association

Programs that are otherwise eligible to participate in the Department of Education's student aid programs also qualify as eligible educational institutions. Most accredited public, nonprofit, and private post-secondary institutions are considered eligible educational institutions.

==== Qualified tuition and educational expenses ====
Qualified tuition and educational expenses include:

- Tuition
- School fees
- The cost of course materials required to enroll in a class (e.g. lab fees)

Qualified tuition and educational expenses do not include:

- Application and processing fees
- Books and other course materials that are not required to enroll in a class
- Money paid for any course that involves sports, games, or hobbies, unless part of a degree program or job skills training
- Room, board, insurance, medical insurance, transportation, personal costs, living and family expenses

==== Exceptions ====
There are several instances in which a 1098-T form doesn't need to be filed for a particular student:

- Courses for which no academic credit is offered (such as adjunct courses), regardless of enrollment status
- Nonresident alien students
- Students whose tuition are either completely waived or completely covered by scholarships
- Students whose tuition is covered by a third party under a formal agreement (such as through the Department of Defense or Veterans Affairs)

=== Form requirements ===
Form 1098-T requires several lines of identification, including the filer's name, address, phone number, and tax identification number, as well as the same information for the student. The filer information is for the filer themselves, not the name, address, and telephone number of the institution.

Following that are ten boxes that must be filled out:

1. The amount of tuition that's already paid by the student.
2. The amount billed to the student that has yet to be paid.
3. A checkbox to reflect if reporting method has been changed since the previous year. The institution is only required to report in either Box 1 or Box 2 if they switch the box they report in, they must check this box.
4. Monetary adjustments made for a prior year.
5. The amount granted to the student via scholarships or grants.
6. Adjustments to the student's scholarships or grants for a prior year.
7. A checkbox indicating whether the amounts indicated in Boxes 1 or 2 also includes tuition paid or billed for the beginning of the following year. For example, if the form is for year 2015, the checkbox would cover any tuition billed or paid for January through March 2016.
8. A checkbox for whether the student counts as a half-time student.
9. A checkbox for whether the student is a graduate student.
10. Shows how much money is reimbursed by an insurer. If a student has tuition insurance and must withdraw from school, then an insurer will reimburse some of their nonrefundable tuition.

== History ==
=== Creation ===
Form 1098-T was originally created in the Taxpayer Relief Act of 1997, alongside the Hope Credit and the Lifetime Learning Credit (and, later, the American Opportunity Tax Credit), to help taxpayers pay for postsecondary education. The first 1098-T form only had four boxes, two blank ones that required no entry, and two checkboxes for part-time and graduate students.

=== Revisions ===
- 2001: New rules for describing qualifying tuition were set in place. Boxes for "Qualified Tuition and Expenses", "Reimbursements or refunds", and "Scholarships or grants" were added
- 2002: Institutions are now given the option to report either the payments billed or the payments received. There was also an option to report payments for the beginning of 2003. The box "Reimbursements or refunds" was changed to "Adjustments made to a prior year"
- 2006: A checkbox is added to report changes to the institutions reporting method (i.e. if they changed reporting from payments billed to payments received or vice versa), for taxpayer's knowledge
- 2009: The American Opportunity Tax Credit is introduced, and the 1098-T can be used to claim the credit

=== 2016 revision ===
In March 2015, a report released by the Treasury Inspector General for Tax Administration revealed that taxpayers were erroneously claiming over five billion dollars in education credits. Over half of the claimed money came from taxpayers for whom no Form 1098-T was filed; the rest of the claims came from students who attended less than half-time, students from ineligible institutions, and students who claimed the American Opportunity Tax Credit for longer than four years.

In light of the lost tax revenue, the IRS requires, starting in 2016, that institutions must provide a 1098-T for all eligible students, with an effort required to obtain accurate TINs and the 1098-T is required for taxpayers to claim an education credit. New rules were put into place to help institutions verify that they had valid TINs. A new form was released for the 2016 tax year (shown above) with a new checkbox in the Student's Identification Number box to indicate that the educational institution has made an appropriate effort in obtaining the student's TIN.

Starting in 2016, institutions can no longer rely on payments billed (recorded in Box 2) and can only report payments received (recorded in Box 1), but, due to the change being implemented so late in the fiscal year, any penalties for using Box 2 have been lifted.
