= Taxpayer Relief Act of 1997 =

United States tax cut law

- Long title: An act to provide for reconciliation pursuant to subsections (b)(2) and (d) of section 105 of the concurrent resolution on the budget for fiscal year 1998.
- Enacted by: the 105th United States Congress
- Effective: January 1, 1998

Citations
- Public law: Pub. L. 105–34 (text) (PDF)

Legislative history
- Introduced in the House as H.R. 2014 by John Kasich (R–OH) on June 24, 1997; Committee consideration by United States Committee of the Whole House; Passed the House on June 26, 1997 (253–179); Passed the Senate on June 27, 1997 (80–12) with amendment; House agreed to Senate amendment on July 31, 1997 (389–43) with further amendment; Senate agreed to House amendment on July 31, 1997 (92–8); Signed into law by President Bill Clinton on August 5, 1997

The Taxpayer Relief Act of 1997 (Pub. L. 105–34 (text) (PDF), H.R. 2014, 111 Stat. 787, enacted August 5, 1997) was enacted by the 105th United States Congress and signed into law by President Bill Clinton. The legislation reduced several federal taxes in the United States and notably created the Roth IRA.

== Provisions ==
=== Roth IRA and other individual retirement accounts ===
The legislation is notable for having established the Roth IRA, creating a permanent exemption for these retirement accounts from capital gains taxes. The Roth IRA was initially proposed by Senators William Roth of Delaware and Bob Packwood of Oregon 1989, and Roth pushed for the creation of the IRAs in the 1997 legislation.

The act also provided tax exemptions for retirement accounts as well as education savings in the Hope credit and Lifetime Learning Credit. Some expiring business tax provisions were extended.

=== Other provisions ===
Starting in 1998, a $400 tax credit for each child under age 17 was introduced, which was later increased to $500 in 1999. This credit was phased out for high-income families.

The top marginal long term capital gains rate fell from 28% to 20%, subject to certain phase-in rules. The 15% bracket was lowered to 10%.

The act permanently exempted from taxation the capital gains on the sale of a personal residence of up to $500,000 for married couples filing jointly and $250,000 for singles. This exemption applies to residences the taxpayer(s) lived in for at least two years over the last five. Taxpayers can only claim the exemption once every two years.

The $600,000 estate tax exemption was to increase gradually to $1 million by the year 2006. As inherited assets are automatically revalued to their current or "stepped-up" basis, any capital gains are permanently exempted from taxation.

Family farms and small businesses could qualify for an exemption of $1.3 million, effective 1998. Starting in 1999, the $10,000 annual gift tax exclusion was to be corrected for inflation.

== Legislative history ==
This was the first law devoted solely to tax cuts that Congress enacted using the fast-track budget reconciliation process.

Votes on the final version of the bill following reconciliation were as follows.

House of Representatives

Vote by Party	Yea		Nay	
Republicans	225	99.6%	1	0.4%
Democrats	164	80.0%	41	20.0%
Independents	0	0.0%	1	100%
Total	389	90.0%	43	10.0%
Not voting	2		1	

Senate

Vote by Party	Yea		Nay	
Republicans	55	100%	0	0.0%
Democrats	37	82.2%	8	17.8%
Total	92	92.0%	8	8.0%

The bill was signed into law by President Bill Clinton on August 5, 1997, along with the Balanced Budget Act of 1997.
