= Student and Family Tax Simplification Act =

Proposed United States law

- Long title: To amend the Internal Revenue Code of 1986 to consolidate certain tax benefits for educational expenses, and for other purposes.
- Announced in: the 113th United States Congress
- Sponsored by: Rep. Diane Black (R, TN-6)
- Number of co-sponsors: 1

Codification
- Acts affected: Internal Revenue Code of 1986, Higher Education Act of 1965, American Recovery and Reinvestment Tax Act of 2009
- U.S.C. sections affected: 20 U.S.C. § 1070a, 10 U.S.C. ch. 1606, 38 U.S.C. ch. 32, 20 U.S.C. § 1088, 20 U.S.C. § 1091, and others.
- Agencies affected: United States Department of the Treasury

Legislative history
- Introduced in the House as H.R. 3393 by Rep. Diane Black (R, TN-6) on October 30, 2013; Committee consideration by United States House Committee on Ways and Means; Passed the House on July 24, 2014 (Roll Call Vote 449: 227-187)

The Student and Family Tax Simplification Act (H.R. 3393) is a bill that would amend the Internal Revenue Code to consolidate several different education tax incentives into an expanded American Opportunity Tax Credit. The American Opportunity Tax Credit, under this legislation, would provide a maximum credit of $2,500.

The bill was introduced into the United States House of Representatives during the 113th United States Congress.

== Provisions of the bill ==
This summary is based largely on the summary provided by the Congressional Research Service, a public domain source.

The Student and Family Tax Simplification Act would amend the Internal Revenue Code to provide for an American Opportunity Tax Credit, in lieu of the current Hope Scholarship and Lifetime Learning tax credits and the tax deduction for qualified tuition and related expenses, that provides for each eligible student (i.e., a student who meets certain requirements of the Higher Education Act of 1965 and who is carrying at least 1/2 the normal full-time course load) a credit of 100% of up to $2,000 of qualified tuition and related expenses (i.e., tuition, fees, and course materials, excluding expenses for courses involving sports, games, or hobbies or for expenses unrelated to academic instruction), plus 25% of so much of such expenses as exceeds $2,000, but not more than $4,000. Makes up to $1,500 of such credit refundable. Modifies the phaseout of such credit based on taxpayer modified adjusted gross income by increasing the income level for such phaseout. Allows an inflation adjustment to credit and phaseout amounts for taxable years beginning after 2018.

The bill would eliminate the disallowance of the credit for students who have been convicted of a felony drug offense.

The bill would require a taxpayer claiming such credit to include on the taxpayer's tax return the employer identification number of the educational institution to which qualified tuition and related expenses were paid.

The bill would exclude from gross income, for income tax purposes, amounts received as a Federal Pell Grant in taxable years beginning after 2014.

== Congressional Budget Office report ==
This summary is based largely on the summary provided by the Congressional Budget Office, as ordered reported by the House Committee on Ways and Means on June 25, 2014. This is a public domain source.

H.R. 3393 would amend certain education-related provisions of the Internal Revenue Code. The bill would permanently extend, in modified form, the American Opportunity Tax Credit (AOTC) for tuition and related post-secondary expenses that is currently scheduled to expire at the end of 2017. Modifications to the credit would include increasing the refundable portion (starting in 2015) and indexing the credit and income phaseout amounts for inflation (starting in 2019). The Hope tax credit, which is scheduled to come back into effect in 2018 when the AOTC expires, would be replaced by the AOTC, and the Lifetime Learning tax credit would be repealed. In addition, for Pell grant recipients, the bill would increase the amount of expenses that potentially qualify for the AOTC, and Pell grant amounts that exceeded certain education expenses would no longer be considered taxable income. The bill would also modify the information-reporting requirements on higher educational institutions.

The staff of the Joint Committee on Taxation (JCT) estimates that enacting H.R. 3393 would increase direct spending over the 2014-2024 period by about $73.7 billion, and reduce revenues over that period by about $22.7 billion. JCT therefore estimates that enacting the legislation would increase federal budget deficits by about $96.5 billion over the 2014-2024 period.

The Statutory Pay-As-You-Go Act of 2010 establishes budget-reporting and enforcement procedures for legislation affecting direct spending and revenues. Because enacting H.R. 3393 would affect revenues and direct spending, pay-as-you-go procedures apply.

JCT has determined that the bill contains no intergovernmental or private-sector mandates as defined in the Unfunded Mandates Reform Act.

== Procedural history ==
The Student and Family Tax Simplification Act was introduced into the United States House of Representatives on October 30, 2013 by Rep. Diane Black (R, TN-6). The bill was referred to the United States House Committee on Ways and Means. On July 17, 2014, the bill was reported (amended) alongside House Report 113-526. On July 24, 2014, the House voted in Roll Call Vote 449 to pass the bill 227-187.

On July 24, 2014, President Barack Obama released a statement in opposition to the bill.

== Debate and discussion ==
President Barack Obama released a statement that he opposed the bill because "it is part of a broader effort to pass permanent, unpaid-for extensions of traditional tax extenders that, taken together, would add approximately $800 billion to the deficit." However, the President did say that he supported making the American Opportunity Tax Credit itself permanent.

Rep. Diane Black, who sponsored the bill, argued that "streamlining the number of education provisions and retooling those that are most effective allows us to simplify the (tax) code and reduce some of the confusion that exists today. As a result, students can spend less time figuring out how to finance the cost of a higher education and more time developing the skills they need to succeed in a knowledge-based economy."

Rep. Sander Levin (D-MI) opposed the bill, arguing that "in simplifying education provisions within the tax code, this bill leaves behind numerous undergraduate students, graduate students and lifetime learners" because of the other tax provisions it eliminates and the limit of only the first four years of schooling being eligible for the credit. According to Levin, "in 2013, the Lifetime Learning Credit, which this bill eliminates, served nearly two million students with incomes at or below $75,000, including 1 million with an income of $40,000 or less."

Rep. Charles Rangel (D-NY) objected to the permanence of the tax credit, arguing "there's no provisions to pay for it, and it buries us in more debt." Rep. Dave Camp (R-MI) counter-argued that having a permanent tax credit was necessary to make sure that "families and students can rely on a constant policy."

== See also ==
- List of bills in the 113th United States Congress
