= Physicians' Council for Responsible Reform =

U.S. advocacy group

The Physicians' Council for Responsible Reform was an advocacy group in the United States which opposed proposed legislation to change health care funding.

According to its own website, the council sought "to defeat Members of Congress who support 'ObamaCare' in the upcoming 2010 elections." The group, created by U.S. Representative Tom Price as a front for the National Republican Congressional Committee (NRCC), solicited physicians throughout the U.S. for donations, by sending faxes and letters containing different lists of 100 names of physicians, implying to the target of the correspondence that the other named physicians have already chosen to join the council. However, the names of physicians were used without their permission. Since June 2009, the NRCC has raised more than $1.2 million this way, and smaller news outlets have run articles claiming their local physicians are among only 100 individuals chosen to "serve" on the council.

The organization has not been active since 2010.
