= Tom Price (American politician) =

American politician (born 1954)

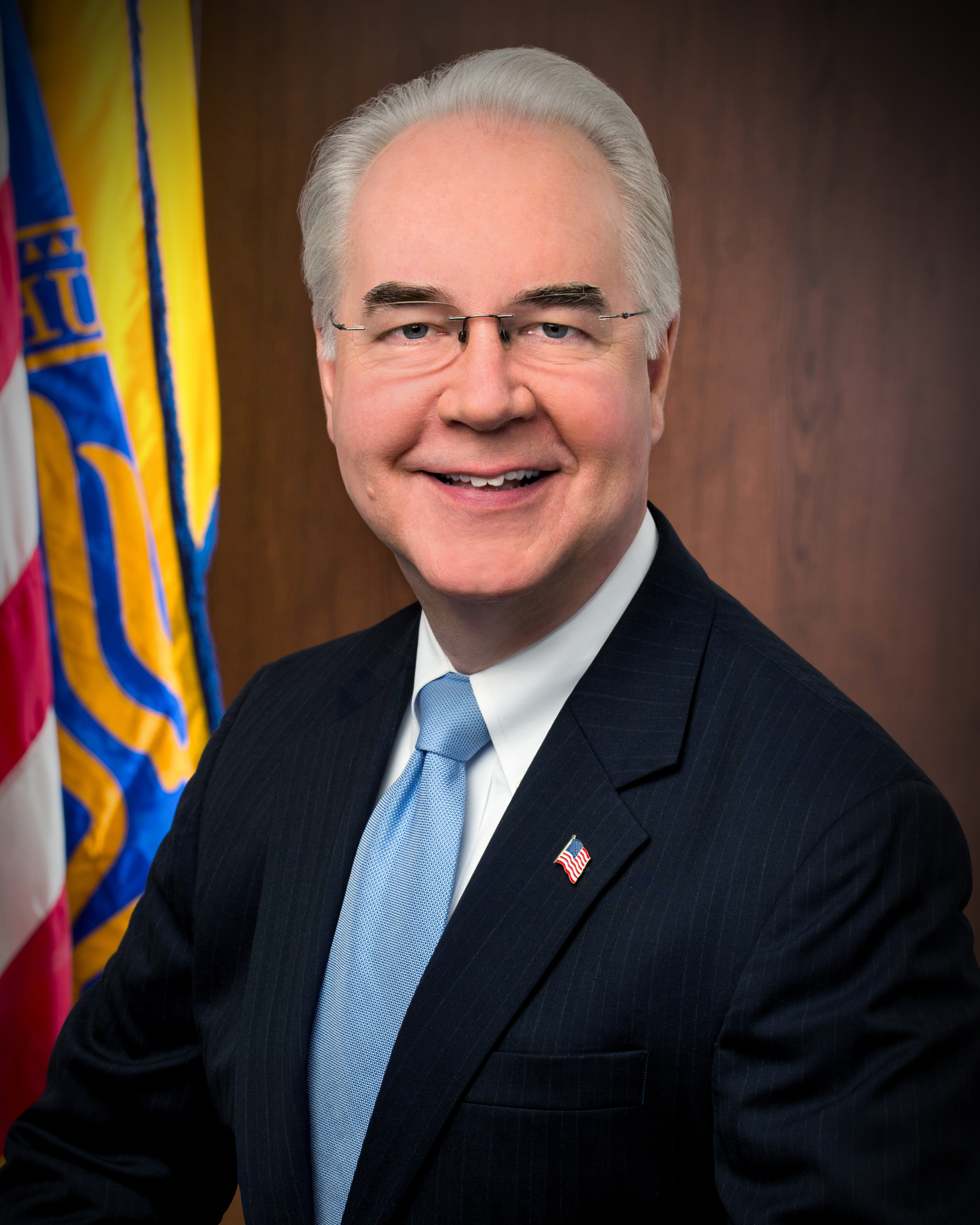
- Official portrait, 2017

23rd United States Secretary of Health and Human Services
- In office February 10, 2017 – September 29, 2017
- President: Donald Trump
- Preceded by: Sylvia Mathews Burwell
- Succeeded by: Alex Azar

Chair of the House Budget Committee
- In office January 3, 2015 – January 3, 2017
- Preceded by: Paul Ryan
- Succeeded by: Diane Black

Member of the U.S. House of Representatives from Georgia's 6th district
- In office January 3, 2005 – February 10, 2017
- Preceded by: Johnny Isakson
- Succeeded by: Karen Handel

Majority Leader of the Georgia Senate
- In office November 14, 2002 – June 17, 2003
- Preceded by: Charles Walker
- Succeeded by: Bill Stephens

Member of the Georgia Senate from the 56th district
- In office January 3, 1997 – January 3, 2005
- Preceded by: Sallie Newbill
- Succeeded by: Dan Moody

Personal details
- Born: Thomas Edmunds Price; October 8, 1954 (age 72) Lansing, Michigan, U.S.
- Party: Republican
- Spouse: Betty Clark (m. 1983)
- Children: 1
- Education: University of Michigan (BA, MD)
- Price's voice Price's opening statement at his confirmation hearing to be United States Secretary of Health and Human Services. Recorded January 24, 2017

Thomas Edmunds Price (born October 8, 1954) is an American physician and Republican Party politician who served as the 23rd Secretary of Health and Human Services under President Donald Trump from February to September 2017. He previously served as the U.S. representative for Georgia's 6th congressional district, encompassing the northern suburbs of Atlanta, from 2005 to 2017. While in Congress, Price chaired the House Committee on the Budget, Republican Study Committee and Republican Policy Committee.

On September 29, 2017, he resigned as head of HHS following criticism of using government money to pay for private jet travel. In July 2018, the HHS inspector general urged the HHS to recoup at least $341,000 from Price for wasteful expenditures.

== Early life, education, and medical career ==
Price was born in Lansing, Michigan, and grew up in Dearborn, where he attended Adams Jr. High and Dearborn High School. Price's father and grandfather were both doctors. As a child, Price occasionally accompanied his grandfather on house calls in Toledo, Ohio. Until Price was the age of six, his father worked a dairy farm in Fowlerville, Michigan.

Price received his B.A. (1975) and M.D. (1979) degrees from the University of Michigan. He completed a residency in orthopedic surgery at Emory University School of Medicine in Atlanta, and settled in the suburb of Roswell, Georgia. He entered private practice in 1984 and returned to Emory as an assistant professor of orthopedic surgery in 2002. He was the director of the orthopedic clinic at Atlanta's Grady Memorial Hospital, where he met his wife Betty, who worked there as anesthesiologist.

Price was a member of the Association of American Physicians and Surgeons (AAPS), a politically conservative group founded in 1943 to "fight socialized medicine" and known to promote a range of scientifically discredited claims. The AAPS opposes Medicare and mandatory vaccination. Price is also a member of the American Medical Association. Before entering the state senate, Price was politically active as a member of the Republican Party and traveled with the Medical Association of Georgia in the early 1990s to oppose the Clinton health care plan of 1993.

== Georgia Senate (1996–2005) ==
=== Elections and results ===
Price first ran for office after receiving a phone call from state senator Sallie Newbill in 1995. Newbill, who represented Georgia's 56th senate district, was planning to retire and personally asked Price if he was interested in succeeding her. Price accepted the offer and defeated Democrat Ellen Milholland in the election, 71–29%. In a 1998 rematch, he won re-election to a second term by defeating Milholland by a margin of 75–25%. In 2000 and 2002, he won re-election to a third and fourth term unopposed.

Price has cited discontent with government regulations of the health care industry as his primary reason for becoming involved in politics.

=== Committee memberships ===
During his tenure as a state senator, Price served on the committees for Appropriations, Economic Development and Tourism, Education, Ethics, Health and Human Services, Insurance and Labor, Reapportionment and Redistricting, and Rules.

=== Tenure ===
Price was elected minority whip of the Georgia state senate on November 6, 1998. He held this position until November 14, 2002, when Republicans took control of the state senate, and Price was elected majority leader – the first Republican to ever hold this position in Georgia. He was replaced as majority leader by Bill Stephens on June 17, 2003.

== U.S. House of Representatives (2005–2017) ==
=== Elections ===
2004

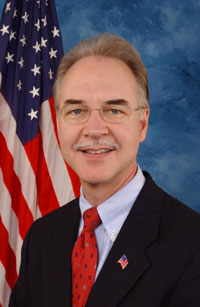
Congressman Price in 2005

In late April 2003, Price formally announced his candidacy for Georgia's 6th congressional district in the United States House of Representatives. The seat was being vacated by Republican Johnny Isakson, who had decided to pursue an opening in the U.S. Senate. Bob Barr, a former U.S. Congressman, was considered an early frontrunner in the race to replace Isakson, but Barr withdrew his candidacy for personal reasons, shortly before Price entered the race. Price went on to run against two fellow state senators, Chuck Clay and Robert Lamutt, as well as two state representatives, Roger Hines and Mark Burkhalter. Also taking part in the race was John McCallum, a former aide to U.S. House Speaker Newt Gingrich.

At the time, Georgia's 6th Congressional district included parts of Fulton, Cherokee, and Cobb counties. The district lines had been drawn so as to heavily favor Republicans - The Atlanta Journal-Constitution called the district a "honey pot" for the party and suggested that whoever won that year's primary would likely retain the seat "into the next decade". Isakson had won the previous election with eighty percent of the vote, and no Democrat entered the race to replace him.

Following Barr's withdrawal from the race, Lamutt, a millionaire venture capitalist who self-financed much of his own campaign, was generally considered to be the new frontrunner; although The Atlanta Journal-Constitution suggested that Clay, who had previously run an unsuccessful campaign to be Lieutenant Governor of the state, likely had the most name recognition of the remaining candidates. Clay had also served as Republican minority leader in the state legislature, several years before Price became the party's majority leader. Price's residence in Fulton County was seen as a disadvantage, because the 6th district had been exclusively represented by Cobb County residents since 1991. All of Price's opponents on the final ballot lived in Cobb. Price considered relocating, in order to improve his chances in the race, but he ultimately decided against this.

Despite this handicap, Price had out-raised his opponents by late July, and although he was briefly overtaken by Clay, he reclaimed his top position in the 6th district race within a few months. In February 2004, it was reported that Clay and Price were the two highest-funded candidates in that year's Congressional races, nationwide. Federal election law put a limit of $2,000 on individual contributions to the campaigns, but Lamutt activated a clause that raised this limit to $6,000 for his opponents, when he loaned $600,000 to his own campaign. Lamutt would eventually increase this loan to $1.5 million, while Clay loaned at least $500,000 to his own campaign. In late April 2004, it was reported that Price had put a loan of $200,000 into the race. Despite this disparity in self-funding, Price had received contributions from a significantly higher number of donors than his opponents. At least $300,000 of Price's campaign funds came from the health care industry.

In the final week of the election, several polls had Price ahead. The Atlanta Journal-Constitution endorsed Clay over Price and the others, arguing that there was "little difference among the contestants on the issues", but that Clay had exhibited the greatest skill as a negotiator, while in the state legislature. Burkhalter and McCallum were not on the final ballot. On July 11, 2004, a televised debate was held between the remaining candidates. The election was then held on July 20. While early voting results showed Lamutt in the lead, Price overtook him by the end of the night and finished in first with 35% of the vote. Lamutt came in second, earning 28% of the vote, and Clay took third with 21% of the vote. Because Price failed to earn over 50% of the vote, a run-off election between him and Lamutt was scheduled for August 10.

The Atlanta Journal-Constitution proceeded to endorse Price in the run-off election, arguing that he had demonstrated strong leadership abilities in the state senate, during "difficult budget years". Lamutt was generally favored to win though, based on the assumption that he would consolidate the vote in Cobb County. A televised debate between Price and Lamutt was held on August 1, and early voting began the following day - the first time in Georgia state history that early voting was allowed in a runoff election. Price upset expectations by winning 54% of the vote - carrying about 80% in Fulton County and about 40% in Cobb County. Price then won the general election unopposed.

2006

Georgia's 6th Congressional district was redrawn in 2005 to include all of Cherokee County. Additionally, it gained the northern tip of DeKalb County and retained only the eastern section of Cobb County. That Fall, John Konop, a businessman from Cherokee, announced that he would challenge Price in the Republican primary. Konop ran to the right of Price on immigration policy and criticized Price's support for the Central American Free Trade Agreement. He also argued that Price's support for transportation and energy bills would increase the federal deficit. Price defended these bills, arguing that the former would return more tax-payer money to Georgia and that the latter could potentially help the United States achieve energy independence. Price raised $1.5 million throughout the primary campaign, while Konop merely raised around $50,000. The Atlanta Journal-Constitution endorsed Price in the primary election, suggesting that Price could play an important role in shaping future healthcare legislation. A televised debate between the candidates was held on July 7, 2006, and the election was then held on July 18. Price defeated Konop, 82%–18%.

Price then faced a Democratic challenger in the general election - Steve Sinton, a media figure from Cobb County, who had co-founded the liberal talk radio news network Air America. Sinton argued that the Republican-controlled Congress had been irresponsible in its spending policies and oversight of the Iraq War. The Atlanta Journal-Constitution considered these to be valid concerns but endorsed Price for re-election, arguing that he would better represent the conservative 6th district's constituents. In November, Price won re-election to a second term with 72% of the vote.

2008–2014

Price was unopposed in the 2008 Republican primary. He then ran against Democratic candidate Bill Jones, a retired air force pilot, in the general election. Jones was described by The Atlanta Journal-Constitution as a moderate. He cited Price's opposition to an expansion of the Children's Health Insurance Program as one of his primary reasons for entering the race. Jones managed to raise over $225,000 - more than any other Democratic challenger in Georgia's congressional elections that year. An easy victory for Price was still predicted though. A debate was scheduled for October 21, 2008, but Price was not in attendance, as Congress was in session at the time. Jones was still allowed to deliver remarks at the event. Price carried a large margin of victory over Jones, earning 69% of the vote.

In 2010, Price was unopposed in both the primary and the general election. He was again unopposed in the 2012 and 2014 primaries, but faced Democratic challengers each year in November. In 2012, Jeff Kazanow, a business consultant, narrowly beat Robert Montigel, a small-business owner, in the 6th district's Democratic primary. Montigel went on to become the district's Democratic nominee in 2014. Price won re-election to a fifth term in 2012, beating Kazanow with 64% of the vote, and to a sixth term in 2014, beating Montigel with 66% of the vote.

2016

After being unopposed in the 2016 Republican primary, Price faced Democratic challenger Rodney Stooksbury in the general election. Stooksbury, said to be a retired aeronautic, was described by the media as a "ghost candidate", as he had no public photographs, official website, or social media presence. When CBS46 sent a reporter to his listed address, there was no answer, and Stooksbury's supposed neighbors had never heard of him. The Stooksbury campaign spent a mere $346. Despite the handicap of possibly not existing, Stooksbury performed better than any of his predecessors - Price won the election, but only carried 61% of the vote.

=== Tenure ===
Price was chosen to serve as chair of the Republican Study Committee in November 2008, upon being elected to his third term in Congress. Two years later, he was chosen to serve as chair of the House Republican Policy Committee, which made him the "fifth highest ranking Republican in the House". Price was also chosen in 2010 to serve on the Ways and Means Committee and on the Budget Committee. In December 2012, he was named vice-chair of the Budget Committee, serving under Paul Ryan, and in November 2014, Price succeeded Ryan as the committee's chair.

In 2012, Price sought the position of House Republican Conference chair, which would have made him the fourth-highest-ranking Republican in the House. He was endorsed by Ryan, as well as by the Tea Party-affiliated organization FreedomWorks, conservative political commentator Erick Erickson, future vice-president and then-governor of Indiana Mike Pence, and outgoing Republican Conference Chairman Jeb Hensarling. Ryan said of Price, "He was instrumental in drafting our House Republican budget. His vocal leadership on issues like health care, tax reform, and fiscal matters has been vital to our messaging and policy efforts. No one will work harder than Congressman Price at building a strong and compelling communications and policy strategy that reflects the will of our membership and the needs of the nation." Although then-Speaker of the House John Boehner did not publicly endorse anyone in the race, he was seen as preferring Price's challenger for the position, Cathy McMorris Rodgers, and offered Price a different position if he dropped out of the race for Conference Chairman - Price turned down the offer. He lost the election to McMorris Rodgers in November.

That same year, Price was considered as a possible primary challenger for Republican senator Saxby Chambliss, and in 2014, Price was considered as a possible replacement for Eric Cantor as the House Majority Leader, but Price ultimately decided against pursuing either of these positions.

In 2013, the American Conservative Union named Price one of the most conservative members of Congress, giving him a 100% approval rating. Price was also described as one of the most conservative members of Congress by the Atlanta Journal-Constitution and the New York Times.

Price is a member of the Republican Main Street Partnership.

=== Voting record and political views ===
==== Healthcare ====
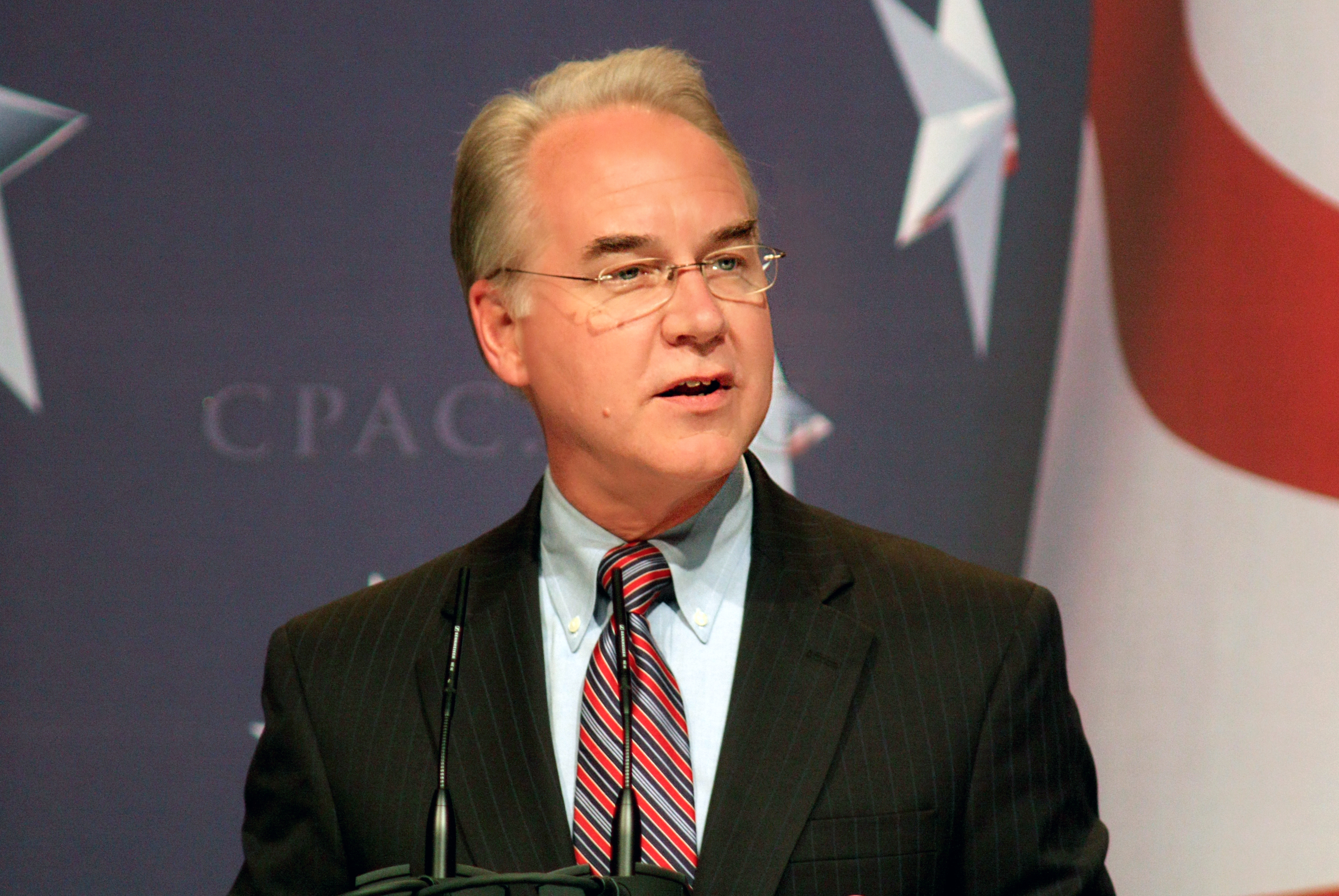
Price speaking at the 2010 Conservative Political Action Conference (CPAC)

In response to questions as to whether or not vaccines cause autism, Price stated in January 2017 "I think the science in that instance is that it does not". Price said in March 2017 that it should be up to individual states to determine whether vaccinations should be required - a position that is in keeping with current U.S. law, which does not require vaccinations on a federal level. All fifty states, however, have laws requiring that children in public schools be vaccinated.

As a U.S. Representative, Price voted multiple times to repeal the Patient Protection and Affordable Care Act, as well as portions of the Health Care and Education Reconciliation Act of 2010. Price introduced his first post-Obamacare bill as early as 2009, thereafter reintroducing updated versions in every Congress since that point. In May 2015, as House Budget Committee chair, Price released health care legislation which was described by Bill Kristol of the National Review as "the strongest Obamacare alternative offered in Congress to date." Greg Sargent of the Washington Post wrote of the bill, "it's good to have a fleshed out plan, because it helps clarify the differences between the parties on health reform." Sargent also wrote that "GOP reforms would likely translate into lower-quality plans and a coverage expansion that would benefit fewer people. But that would be the trade-off Republicans would make to achieve their goal of less government spending and interference in the market than that which occurs under Obamacare." In 2017, after Price was nominated to be Secretary of Health and Human Services, NPR wrote that Price's 2015 bill would be seen as "one of the main paths forward to repeal portions of the ACA."

Price has supported Paul Ryan's plan to privatize Medicare.

==== Tobacco ====
Price has received funding from the tobacco industry as well as having a substantial shareholding in tobacco companies Philip Morris International and Altria. Price voted against the Family Smoking Prevention and Tobacco Control Act, a law that for the first time gave the Food and Drug Administration regulatory jurisdiction over tobacco products, i.e., the power to regulate tobacco as a drug.

In 2024 he acknowledged that he was working "as an advisor to PMI Global Services Inc".

==== Abortion ====
Price opposes abortion and voted to withdraw federal funding for Planned Parenthood. In 2005, he co-sponsored the Right to Life Act, which would have defined life as beginning at the moment of conception, therefore banning most abortions and many forms of contraception. On multiple occasions, Price supported the proposed Pain-Capable Unborn Child Protection Act, which would have implemented a nationwide ban on abortions occurring after the twentieth week of pregnancy.

Price supported the proposed Protect Life Act of 2011, which would have amended the Patient Protection and Affordable Care Act (often abbreviated as the ACA) to deny federal subsidies to any health insurance plans offering abortion coverage - exceptions would have been allowed in the cases of rape, incest, or when a mother's life is at risk. The ACA already banned federal subsidies from being used to cover abortions, but did allow health insurance plans covering abortions to receive federal subsidies, so long as such funding was not directly used for abortion coverage. The Protect Life Act would have also allowed hospitals to refuse life-saving abortions to women in emergency situations.

In 2013, Price co-sponsored the Health Care Conscience Rights Act, which would have amended the ACA to allow all employers opposed to abortion and contraception to offer health insurance plans that do not cover these services. The bill also would have amended the Public Health Service Act to strengthen protections of health care workers who refuse to participate in abortion procedures.

Among the ACA's other provisions, Price is opposed to the bill's elimination, under most health insurance plans, of co-pays for birth control. Price defended his position on this issue in a 2012 interview by suggesting that no women in the country have ever struggled to pay for birth control. He said, "Bring me one woman who has been left behind. Bring me one. There's not one." Numerous media outlets have refuted this assertion. In 2017, during his confirmation hearing to become Secretary of Health and Human Services, Price was questioned about this comment and responded, "What I meant is that when I had patients in my office who could not afford a medication we did everything we could to make sure they could have it. There are avenues in the health care system that doctors and hospitals take to make sure people can get the health care they need."

Price has received perfect scores from the National Right to Life Committee, while receiving scores of zero from both Planned Parenthood and NARAL Pro-Choice America. He participated in the March for Life annually from 2009 through 2013 and also participated in 2015.

==== Economic policy ====
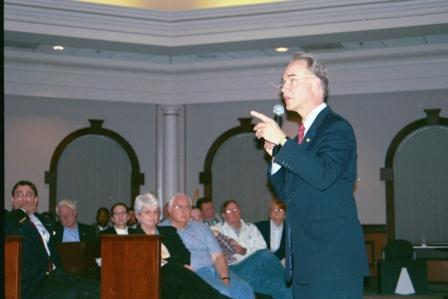
Price speaking in Roswell, Georgia, in 2005

In 2011, Price voted to reduce non-security discretionary spending to 2008 levels (and subsequently voted against several amendments offered via motions to recommit with instructions).

In 2013, he was the main sponsor of the Require a PLAN Act (mandating that the President identify a fiscal year in which the budget will be balanced). He voted for the No Budget, No Pay Act and a resolution establishing a budget for the United States Government for FY 2014 that passed the House of Representatives. In 2011, Price voted to prohibit federal funding of National Public Radio. Price voted to terminate the Emergency Mortgage Relief Program. Price voted to reduce federal spending and the deficit by terminating taxpayer financing of presidential election campaigns and party conventions.

==== Environment, energy, and agriculture ====
Price rejects the scientific consensus on climate change. In 2008, he signed a pledge sponsored by Americans for Prosperity promising to vote against any global warming legislation that would raise taxes. In 2010, while speaking out against proposed regulations of carbon dioxide, Price said that the science behind global warming was filled with "errors and obfuscation".

In 2006, Price voted against the Deep Ocean Energy Resources Act - a bill which maintained the moratorium on most offshore oil and gas drilling in the United States. Although the moratorium was lifted two years later, it was reinstated under President Barack Obama, prompting Price to vote in favor of the Reversing Pres. Obama's Offshore Moratorium Act in 2011.

In 2007, Price voted against the No Oil and Exporting Cartels (NOPEC) Act, which would have removed sovereign immunity protections for OPEC, allowing the organization's members to be sued in the U.S. court system. Although the bill passed with bipartisan support in Congress, it was vetoed by President George W. Bush.

That same year, Price voted against the Creating Long-Term Energy Alternatives for the Nation (CLEAN) Act, which would have eliminated tax breaks and subsidies for oil and gas companies - the newly raised funds would have then been used to support the development of alternative energy sources. Price also voted against providing funding for domestically produced biofuels, and on multiple occasions, he voted against providing tax incentives for renewable energy.

In 2009, Price voted against the American Clean Energy and Security Act, which would have implemented a cap and trade system on greenhouse gas emissions. Although the bill was never voted on in the Senate, the Obama administration proceeded to regulate greenhouse gas emissions through the Clean Power Plan. In 2011, Price voted for the Energy Tax Prevention Act, which would have prevented the Environmental Protection Agency from implementing such regulations.

In 2011, Price supported the Farm Dust Regulation Prevention Act, which would have prevented the Environmental Protection Agency from regulating the amount of dust produced through various commercial operations, and the Superfund Common Sense Act, which would have removed manure from the federal government's list of hazardous or pollutant substances. He also voted for the Agricultural Disaster Assistance Act of 2012, which had it become law, would have made financial assistance available to ranchers who had lost livestock due to drought. The cost of the assistance would have been offset by cuts to programs intended to prevent future droughts.

The American Farm Bureau Federation gave Price a score of 82% in 2005–2006, 23% in 2007–2008, 66% in 2009–2010, 70% in 2011, and 25% in 2014. Price consistently received 0% approval ratings from the National Farmers Union, during his time in Congress, except for when he received a score of 11% in 2012.

The League of Conservation Voters gave Price a lifetime score of 4%.

==== Foreign policy ====
Price voted to extend the Patriot Act. Price voted against a resolution which would have forced the president to withdraw American forces from Iraq. In 2015, Price stated his belief that states should not have to participate in refugee resettlement programs.

During Price's first year in Congress, he voted for the United Nations Reform Act of 2005, which would have withdrawn up to one-half of US funding for the United Nations, unless various reforms were met. In 2011, Price voted for the United Nations Transparency, Accountability, and Reform Act, which would have limited the kind of funding allowed to be contributed to the United Nations.

In 2005, Price voted against the East Asia Security Act, which would have allowed for sanctions on any country violating the arms embargo on China. In 2007, Price co-sponsored the Syria Accountability and Liberation Act, which would have strengthened the sanctions imposed on Syria under the Syria Accountability Act, and maintained those sanctions until weapons of mass destruction were seized in the country and dismantled. In 2008, Price voted in favor of the United States-India Nuclear Cooperation Approval and Non-proliferation Enhancement Act.

==== Gun policy ====
Price opposed gun control. Throughout his congressional career, he consistently received high ratings from the NRA Political Victory Fund, as well as from the Gun Owners of America, while consistently receiving scores of 0 from the Brady Campaign to Prevent Gun Violence.

In 2005, Price voted for the Protection of Lawful Commerce in Arms Act, which protects firearms manufacturers and dealers from facing legal consequences, when crimes are committed with the use of their products.

In 2007, Price co-sponsored the D.C. Personal Protection Act, which would have repealed many of Washington D.C.'s local gun control regulations, over the protests of D.C.'s elected officials. Although the bill failed to become law, the 2008 Supreme Court decision District of Columbia v. Heller found that the absolute prohibition of handguns in D.C. was unconstitutional. Price praised this decision, as well as the Supreme Court decision reached two years later in McDonald v. City of Chicago, which stated that the Second Amendment applies to the states.

In 2009, Price supported the National Right-to-Carry Reciprocity Act, which would have made concealed carry permits issued by any state valid nationwide.

==== Immigration ====
Price believes that illegal immigrants in the United States should be deported, saying in 2005 of George W. Bush's plans for immigration reform, "Thinly veiled attempts to promote amnesty cannot be tolerated." In 2009, Price voted for the Birthright Citizenship Act, which would have revised the Fourteenth Amendment to the United States Constitution to prevent children born to illegal immigrants in the country from attaining birthright citizenship. Price has written in support of legislation that allows green cards that went unused due to bureaucratic inefficiencies to be reissued to foreign physicians and nurses who are trained to practice in the United States.

==== LGBTQ rights ====
In 2006, Price voted for the Marriage Protection Amendment, which would have defined marriage as being between a man and a woman. He was one of the proposed amendment's co-sponsors, when it was reintroduced in 2008. On multiple occasions, Price voted against the Employment Non-discrimination Act, which would have expanded federal anti-discrimination law to prohibit employers from discriminating on the basis of sexual orientation (several states already have such a protection and exceptions for religious organizations would have been allowed). In 2015, he co-sponsored the First Amendment Defense Act, which would have prevented the federal government from penalizing businesses that deny services to same-sex couples.

In 2009, Price opposed the Matthew Shepard and James Byrd Jr. Hate Crimes Prevention Act, which extended the scope of federal hate crime laws to include crimes in which individuals are targeted due to their sexual orientation, gender, or gender identity. Price also voted against the Don't Ask, Don't Tell Repeal Act of 2010 and the Violence Against Women Reauthorization Act of 2013, which extended the original bill's protections to cover same-sex couples.

In 2016, Price criticized the Obama administration's directive that allowed transgender students to use restrooms corresponding with their gender identity. On Facebook, Price wrote, "It is absurd that we need a 'federal restroom policy' for our nation's schools. This is yet another abuse and overreach of power by the #Obama Administration, and a clear invasion of privacy. Schools should not have to fear retaliation for failure to comply."

Price consistently received scores of zero from the Human Rights Campaign (a gay rights organization) throughout his congressional career, except for between 2007 and 2010, when he received 10% approval ratings.

=== Legislation sponsored by Price ===
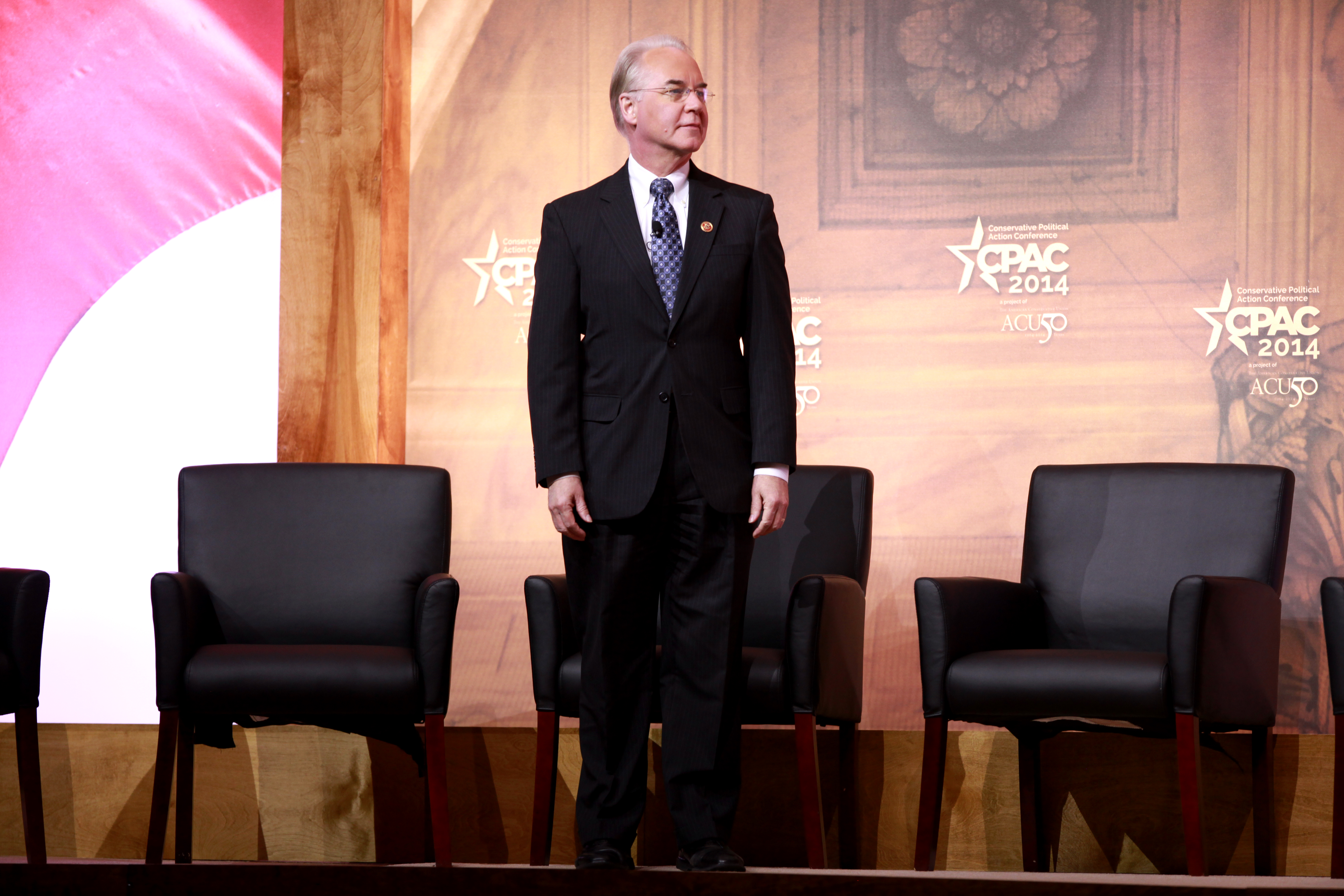
Price speaking on a panel about healthcare at the 2014 CPAC

Price is the sponsor of the Empowering Patients First Act (EPFA), which he first introduced in the 111th Congress and has reintroduced in each Congress since then. Originally intended to be a Republican alternative to Democratic efforts to reform the health care system, it has since been positioned by Price and other Republicans as a potential replacement for the ACA. The bill, among other things, creates and expands tax credits for purchasing health insurance, allows for some interstate health insurance markets, and reforms medical malpractice lawsuits.

Price introduced the Pro-Growth Budgeting Act of 2013 on May 8, 2013. The bill would require the Congressional Budget Office to provide a macroeconomic impact analysis for bills that are estimated to have a large budgetary effect. Price said it was necessary because of the Congressional Budget Office's current method of reviewing bills just to see what they would cost. Price said, "that is a model that has proven to be incapable of providing the type of macroeconomic diagnosis folks need to make sure we are pursuing policies that will help generate economic opportunity and bring down the nation's debt." H.R. 1874 has passed the House but has yet to become law.

=== Committee assignments ===
- Committee on the Budget (chair 2015–2017)
- Committee on Ways and Means
  - Subcommittee on Health
  - Subcommittee on Human Resources

=== Caucus memberships ===
- Congressional Constitution Caucus
- Friends of Wales Caucus

== Involvement in U.S. Presidential elections ==
Price endorsed Mitt Romney in the Republican Party's 2008 presidential primaries and Newt Gingrich in the party's 2012 primaries. In 2016, he supported Marco Rubio and initially opposed Donald Trump, saying in March of that year that Trump would be "dangerous for politics and the economy." Despite this, once Trump became the Republican Party's presumptive nominee, Price switched his allegiance and corralled eight of his fellow House Republican committee chairs into joining him. They released a group endorsement of Donald Trump for president on May 13, 2016, which stated, "There is a path to winning in November, and it comes through unity. To solidify this partnership, we endorse Mr. Trump as the Republican nominee for President and call upon all Americans to support him." A month later, Price's efforts in getting those committee chairs to endorse Trump led the Washington Post to name Price as one of Trump's "top six allies in Congress."

== Secretary of Health and Human Services ==
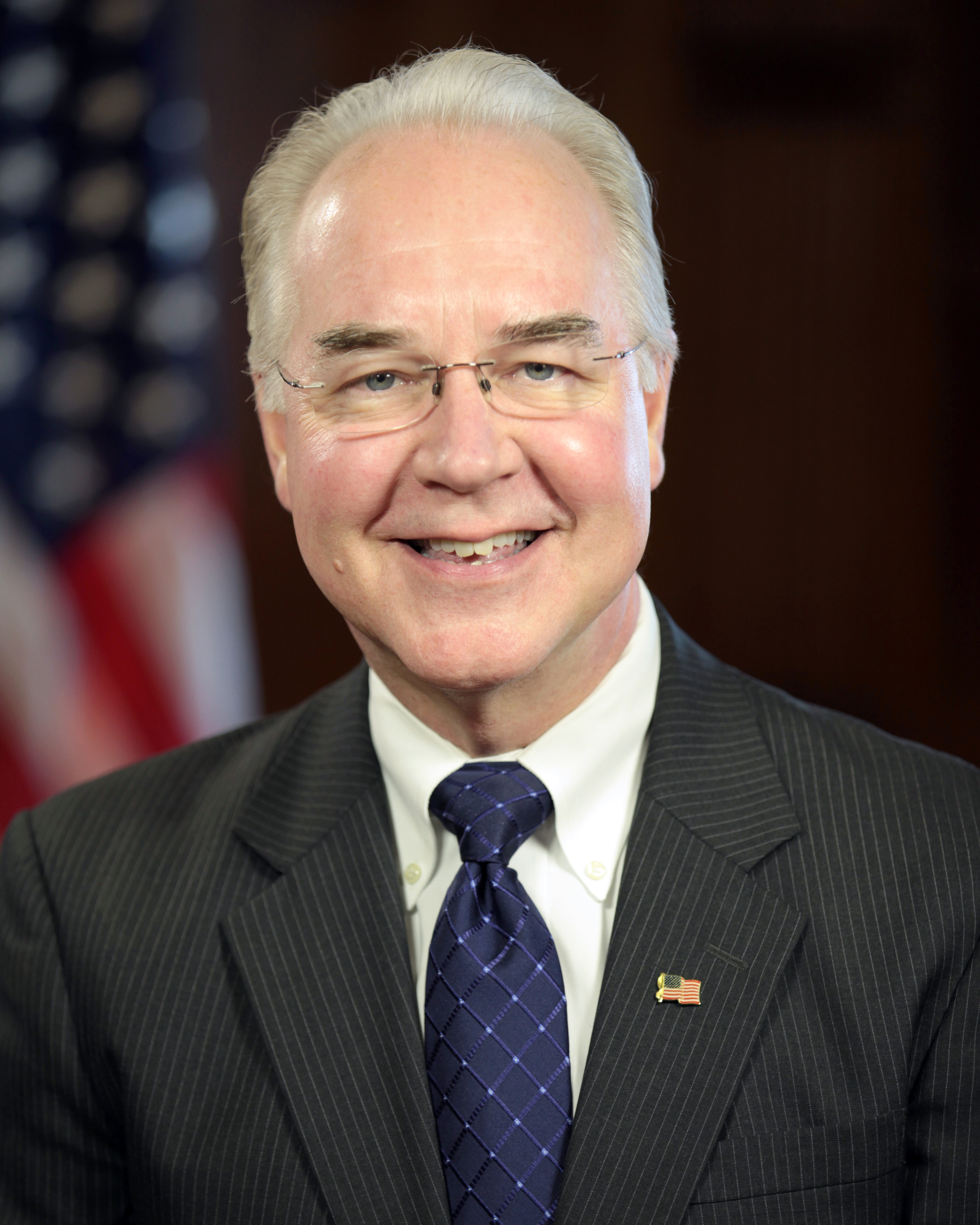
Price's official Trump Transition portrait

On November 29, 2016, Price was nominated for United States Secretary of Health and Human Services (HHS) by President-elect Donald Trump. On February 1, 2017, the Senate Health, Education, Labor, and Pensions Committee approved his nomination by a vote of 11–0 with all Democrats boycotting the vote, sending the nomination to the Senate floor. On February 10, 2017, the Senate confirmed Price in a 52–47 vote.

In March 2017, Price endorsed the American Health Care Act of 2017, a bill proposed by House Republicans that would repeal the individual mandate and make several other major changes to the Patient Protection and Affordable Care Act. When the Congressional Budget Office estimated that the American Health Care Act would insure 24 million fewer Americans than the Affordable Care Act by 2026 and reduce the federal deficit by $337 billion in the same span, Price said he disagreed "strenuously" with the report and found it "not believable".

In April 2017, Public News Service reporter Dan Heyman was arrested by West Virginia police for "aggressively breaching Secret Service agents" and "causing a disturbance by yelling questions" related to proposed healthcare legislation at Price and Kellyanne Conway. Price said the arrest was "not my decision to make".

While he was HHS secretary, he said that the individual mandate (a component of the Affordable Care Act requiring the purchase of health insurance) increased the cost of health care. However, in May 2018, while no longer HHS secretary, Price admitted that the repeal of the individual mandate would reduce participation of young and healthy individuals in the health insurance market and thus drive up the cost of health care for those remaining.

=== Private jet scandal and resignation ===
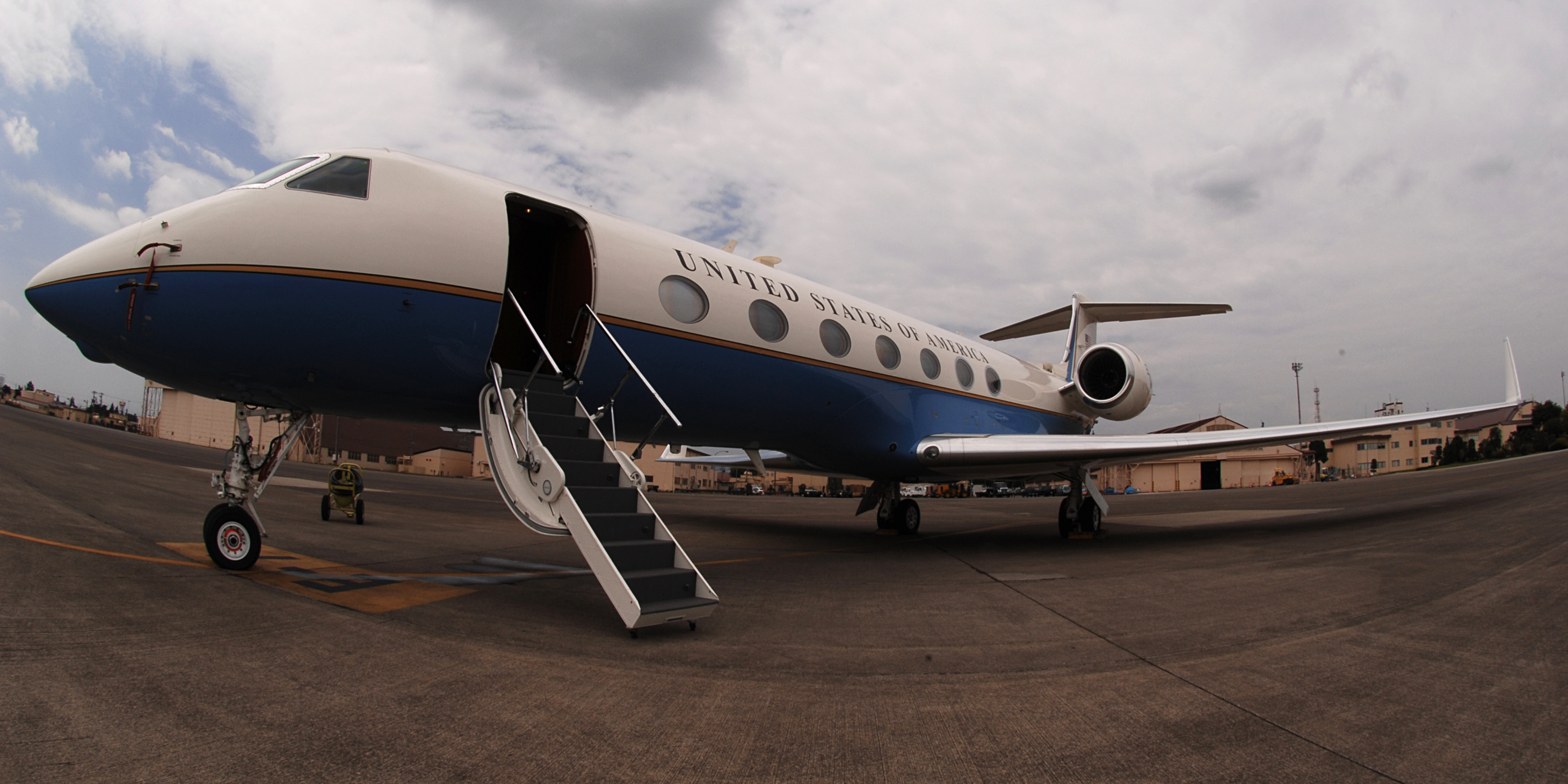
USAF Gulfstream C-37B (military designation of the G550). According to Politico, Secretary Price and his wife flew on a C-37B to Africa and Europe in May 2017 at an estimated cost of $311,418.25 for 30 hours of flight time.

In a series of reports in September 2017, Politico reported that since May 2017, Price spent more than $1 million of department funds for his own travel on private charter jets and military aircraft. Many of the flights were between cities that are easily accessible by train or car and have frequent, low-cost commercial airline service. Five Democratic members of Congress requested an inspector general's investigation into Price's use of private aircraft. Price's use of private planes was legal but was criticized by ethics experts as a misuse of taxpayer funding. Price's spokesperson justified Price's use of private jets as a reasonable precaution, given that Price was once unable to attend an important meeting because a commercial flight was cancelled; Politico noted that the flight in question was cancelled because air travel had been virtually shut down in the region in question at the time, preventing even private jets from taking off. As a congressman in 2009, Price had criticized the use of private jets by government officials as "fiscal irresponsibility run amok".

Following Politico's reporting on the matter, Price said that he would stop taking taxpayer-funded private jet flights pending a formal review by his department's inspector general. President Trump said that he was unhappy about Price's expenditures, but declined to state whether he would fire him. Price said later that September that he would reimburse taxpayers for $51,887, which he calculated as the cost of his seat on the more than $400,000 worth of charter flights. He also vowed to discontinue the use of private charter flights for his travel. Later that day, it was revealed that the expenditures for Price's charter and military flights were higher than $1 million, including flights taken by Secretary Price and his wife to Europe and Africa. Politico also noted that Price had, in June 2017, defended a proposal to cut $663,000 from HHS's $4.9 million annual travel budget.

The reports from Politico sparked a larger inquiry into the use of private planes by Trump administration officials. On September 26, the House Oversight Committee started a bipartisan investigation led by Representatives Trey Gowdy (R-SC) and Elijah Cummings (D-MD) of all use of private and government-owned planes by non-elected government officials of the Executive Branch, citing 5 U.S.C. § 5733, which states "The travel of an employee shall be by the most expeditious means of transportation practicable and shall be commensurate with the nature and purpose of the duties of the employee requiring such travel." Senator Chuck Grassley (R-IA) also sent a letter to the White House asking to "detail what steps the administration has taken to ensure that cabinet secretaries use the most fiscally responsible travel in accordance with the public trust they hold and the spirit and letter of all laws, regulations, and policies that apply."

==== Resignation ====
On September 29, 2017, the White House announced that Price had resigned. Price, with a tenure of 231 days, became the shortest-serving Secretary of Health and Human Services in history. On July 13, 2018, the inspector general of HHS issued a report finding that Price had repeatedly violated government travel rules and had wasted at least $341,000 through his use of chartered jets and military aircraft. The report recommended that the government attempt to recoup the money improperly spent on Price's travels.

== Investment activity ==
In 2015–2016, according to congressional financial disclosures, Price purchased shares totaling between $60,000 and $110,000 in value in Innate Immunotherapeutics, an Australian biotech company. Innate had no approved drugs and just one multiple sclerosis drug in trial. Price participated in a private placement of more shares in August 2016, paying $.25 and $.34 per share. Price invested between $50,000 and $100,000. On January 13, 2017, the shares were valued at $1.31, giving Price an unrealized gain of 300%–400% in a 6-month period. Price announced plans to sell several health care investments, including Innate, upon his confirmation as HHS Secretary.

On January 16, 2017, CNN reported that Price had purchased shares in Zimmer Biomet, a medical devices company. Zimmer Biomet is an S&P 500 component, in that every S&P 500 ETF and numerous mutual funds often trade Zimmer Biomet. Price had a diversified, broker-directed portfolio of hundreds of stocks in which investment decisions were made by a Morgan Stanley financial advisor, and that advisor had purchased these shares, in addition to approximately 70 other stocks, as a part of a periodic portfolio re-balancing. Less than a week after the stock purchase, Price introduced legislation, the HIP Act, that would delay a Centers for Medicare and Medicaid Services regulation until 2018. Industry analysts had warned that those regulations would significantly hurt the company's finances. Following the introduction of the HIP Act, Zimmer Biomet's political action committee donated to Price's reelection campaign.

When questioned about his financial dealings during his confirmation hearing before the U.S. Senate on January 18, 2017, Price said, "[e]verything that we have done has been above-board, transparent, ethical, and legal."

In March 2017, ProPublica reported that U.S. Attorney Preet Bharara had been investigating Price's stock trades before Bharara's dismissal from his post by Donald Trump. Price said that he had not received any indication of a federal investigation into his stock trades.

== Personal life ==
Price and his wife, Betty, reside in Roswell, and have one child, Robert Price. Betty served on the Roswell City Council and was elected to the Georgia House of Representatives in a 2015 special election to succeed the late Harry Geisinger. Price is a Presbyterian.

In 2014, Price had a net worth of approximately $13.6 million.

== See also ==
- Physicians' Council for Responsible Reform
- Physicians in the United States Congress

Georgia State Senate
Preceded by Charles W. Walker	Majority Leader of the Georgia Senate; 2002–2003	Succeeded by Bill Stephens
U.S. House of Representatives
Preceded by Johnny Isakson	Member of the U.S. House of Representatives from Georgia's 6th congressional district 2005–2017	Succeeded by Karen Handel
Preceded by Paul Ryan	Chair of the House Budget Committee; 2015–2017	Succeeded by Diane Black
Party political offices
Preceded by Jeb Hensarling	Chair of the Republican Study Committee; 2009–2011	Succeeded by Jim Jordan
Preceded by Thad McCotter	Chair of the House Republican Policy Committee; 2011–2013	Succeeded by James Lankford
Political offices
Preceded by Sylvia Mathews Burwell	United States Secretary of Health and Human Services; 2017	Succeeded by Alex Azar
U.S. order of precedence (ceremonial)
Preceded by Jeff Sessions as Former U.S. Cabinet Member	Order of precedence of the United States as Former U.S. Cabinet Member	Succeeded by Steve Mnuchin as Former U.S. Cabinet Member
