= Empowering Patients First Act =

The Empowering Patients First Act is legislation sponsored by Rep. Tom Price, first introduced as H.R. 3400 in the 111th Congress. The bill was initially intended to be a Republican alternative to the America's Affordable Health Choices Act of 2009 (H.R. 3200), but has since been positioned as a potential replacement to the Patient Protection and Affordable Care Act (PPACA). The bill was introduced in the 112th Congress as H.R. 3000, and in the 113th Congress as H.R. 2300. As of October 2014, the bill has 58 cosponsors. An identical version of the bill has been introduced in the Senate by Senator John McCain as S. 1851 (113th Congress).

Major provisions of the Act include tax deductions and credits to aid in the purchasing of health insurance, the promotion of state-based high-risk insurance pools, the creation of individual and small employer membership associations and association health plans, allowing for interstate insurance markets, a reform of malpractice lawsuits, and loan and loan repayment programs. The Act intends to fund itself through cuts to future spending increases, more commonly known as sequestration, and expected declines in the uninsured population. The Act's effects on the general public and the federal budget have yet to be assessed by the Congressional Budget Office (CBO) and the Joint Committee on Taxation (JCT).

== Provisions ==
Sections 1 through 3 before the first title contain the Act's short name, table of contents, repeal of the Patient Protection and Affordable Care Act (PPACA), repeal of the health care-related provisions of the Health Care and Education Reconciliation Act of 2010, and a statement that the Act does not possess a guaranteed issue and community rating mandate.

=== Title I – Tax Incentives for Maintaining Health Insurance Coverage ===
Section 101 creates a refundable income tax credit of a maximum of the lesser of either the aggregate amount of money paid in premiums in a single taxable year or the sum of the monthly limitations for months that the taxpayer or the taxpayer's qualifying members are considered eligible. The monthly limitation is one-twelfth of the sum of $2,000 ($4,000 if filing a joint tax return) and $500 per dependent. A maximum of two dependents can be claimed and the credit adjusts to inflation annually. The tax credit can only be claimed if the taxpayer and the taxpayer's spouse and dependents have purchased a qualified health insurance plan. The credit can be claimed in full by taxpayers at or below 200% of the federal poverty level (FPL). Above 200% of the FPL, the percentage of the credit that can be claimed decreases by 1 percentage point for each $1,000 earned over 200% of the FPL. Section 102 directs the Secretary of Health and Human Services (HHS) to create a payment system to allow for the credit to be paid directly to the insurance provider to cover premium expenses in advance. Under Section 103, individuals who are otherwise eligible for Medicare, Medicaid, a state child health insurance program (SCHIP), TRICARE, veterans' benefits, federal employee health benefits (FEHBP), or a group health plan subsidized by the employer may choose to claim the aforementioned tax credit instead of receiving any benefits under such program.

Section 104 creates an itemized tax deduction for individuals equal to the amount paid in premiums by the taxpayer for qualified health insurance in a taxable year, provided that the deduction does not exceed the average value of the national health exclusion for employer-sponsored health insurance.

Section 105 prohibits funds authorized from the Act, as well as tax credits and deductions in the Internal Revenue Code (IRC), from being used to pay for any abortion or to pay for any part of the costs of health insurance plans that cover abortion procedures, excluding instances in which the pregnancy was the result of rape or incest, or if the life of the mother is endangered. Section 106 further prohibits the federal government from discriminating against any health care professional, health care facility, health care organization, or health insurance plan that does not provide, pay for, provide coverage of, or refer for abortions. This prohibition extends to state and local governments that receive federal financial assistance.

Section 107 lifts the 25% excise tax on nonconforming group health plans, plans that don't meet all coverage requirements, and exempts these plans from the Health Insurance Portability and Accountability Act (HIPAA), if any employee can choose to have the employer or employee organization pay a contribution of a minimum of the contribution amount to any health insurance provider for coverage instead of receiving coverage under the group health plan, and if any coverage provided to a participant or beneficiary is treated as a group health plan under section 9801 of the IRC, which permits group health plans to exclude individuals with preexisting conditions under certain circumstances. This extends to the FEHBP, in which contributions to all plans are to be equal irrespective of which benefits plan an employee is enrolled in.

Section 108 prohibits states from establishing laws that would prevent any employers that are allowed an exclusion of gross income, a deduction, or a tax credit for the federal income tax for health benefits from automatically enrolling employees in a group health plan, on the condition that employees are to be enrolled in the plan with the lowest premiums, and that employees are given the option to opt out of auto-enrollment for the employer-sponsored plan. Employers are to provide their employees with a 30-day period to elect to opt out, after which employees will be automatically enrolled.

Section 109 creates a new small business health care tax credit to replace the one currently present in the PPACA. The number of employees in a "small business", for the purpose of this tax credit, would be increased from 25 to 50. The maximum tax credit allowed is revised to be equal to $1,500 more than the sum paid in premiums for an auto-enrolled plan by the taxpayer in all previous taxable years. The tax credit is to be a part of the general business credit.

Section 110 makes a number of modifications to several health tax deductions. Capitated payments to physicians and pre-paid physician fees are to be considered medical expenses under the medical expense tax deduction. Individuals eligible for treatment in the Veteran and Indian health systems will not be considered covered under a health plan merely because they receive periodic medical care from the foregoing health care systems, and will thus not be considered eligible for the health savings account (HSA) tax deduction for that reason.

=== Title II – Health Insurance Pooling Mechanisms for Individuals ===
==== Subtitle A – Federal Grants for State Insurance Expenditures ====
Section 201 authorizes $300 million to be split between the states annually as a grant for states to establish their own qualifying high-risk or reinsurance pool or other risk-adjustment mechanism used for the purpose of subsidizing the purchase of private health insurance. Qualifying high-risk pools must cover only high-risk populations, their spouses, and dependents, offer multiple competing health plan options, and offer at least one or more high-deductible plan in combination with a contribution to an HSA. Qualifying reinsurance pools and other risk-adjustment programs must cover only the same individuals as qualifying high-risk pools, but only on a prospective basis under which the insurer cedes the insured to the pool in exchange for a reinsurance premium. Bonus payments made available under this section can only be used for providing health insurance coverage to certain individuals with prior group coverage, a reduction in premium trends, actual premiums, or other cost-sharing requirements, any expansion of the pool of high-risk individuals, or for adopting the Model Health Plan for Uninsurable Individuals promoted by the National Association of Insurance Commissioners (NAIC).

==== Subtitle B – Health Care Access and Availability ====
Section 211 allows for the creation of "individual and small employer membership associations" (IMAs), associations that make health insurance available to members of the association through contracts with health insurers. Rates for health insurance plans are to be determined by the insurer, and plans offered to any member of the IMA must be available to all members of the IMA. The IMA and its members are not to be held financially liable for any potential losses by the insurer. There are no limits as to where an IMA may operate within the country or how many IMAs may operate in a single geographic area. Coverage in the plans offered to IMAs must comply with state consumer protection laws and can be through a health maintenance organization (HMO), in connection with a preferred provider organization or licensed provider-sponsored organization, indemnity coverage through an insurance company, in connection with a contribution to a medical savings (MSA) or flexible spending (FSA) account, through coverage that includes a point-of-service option, or through any combination of those types of coverage. State laws regulating any benefits requirements, or composition and structure of IMAs, not including requirements under Title XXVII of the Public Health Service Act, shall not apply to IMAs. Any IMA may choose to have its own criteria for individuals or small employers to enter, and insurers contracting with any IMA may choose to have premium discounts, rebates, or modification of copayments or deductibles for members in return for adherence to health promotion and disease prevention programs.

==== Subtitle C – Small Business Health Fairness ====
Subtitle C of Title II can be referred to as the Small Business Health Fairness Act. Most provisions of this subtitle are amendments to the Employee Retirement Income Security Act (ERISA). Under Section 226, the amendments present in this subtitle go into effect within one year after enactment. Group health plans and other arrangements that provide benefits to employees and employees' beneficiaries of participating employers, that have a minimum of 200 participating and contributing employers, and have been in existence for at least 10 years, are grandfathered into the law.

Section 222 allows for the creation of "association health plans" (AHPs), group health insurance plans sponsored by trade, industry, business, or professional associations that function primarily for non-medical care purposes. Members of any AHP must pay regular dues and these payments cannot change based on any member's health status. All AHPs are required to be certified by the applicable authority, and membership cannot be restricted to individuals of any particular trade or industry. Plans must be operated a 3-year basis by a board of trustees, whose members are individuals selected by employers in the AHP from the employers' company, so long as they are active participants of the company, and their employment is not directly related to the plan, excluding if members of the association are providers of medical care. The board of trustees is tasked with approving applications for participation in the plan and administering day-to-day affairs of the plan. An AHP may terminate if the board of trustees notifies in writing to participants and beneficiaries at least 60 days before termination, a plan exists to timely pay all benefits under the plan to the termination date, and if that plan is submitted to the applicable authority.

Each participating employer in an AHP must be a member of the sponsor association, the sponsor, or an affiliated member of the sponsor. All persons receiving coverage must either be active or retired owners of a company (including self-employed), officers, directors, or employees of the participating employer, or beneficiaries of any of those groups. Discrimination against employers and employees eligible to participate in a plan is prohibited. Contributions to the AHP must be nondiscriminatory regarding health status, but can vary based on the claims experience of the plan. The number of covered individuals in a plan must be a minimum of 1,000 if the benefits do not provide health insurance coverage. For benefit plans that provide health insurance coverage, the coverage is required to be distributed by licensed insurance agents.

For AHPs that solely offer health insurance coverage, or provide additional non-coverage benefits, reserves are to be established and maintained. These reserves must be sufficient for unearned contributions, for benefit liabilities which have been incurred, have not been satisfied, for which risk of loss has not yet been transferred, for administrative costs with respect to such liabilities, for any other plan obligations, and for fluctuations and a margin of error. Each plan must establish and maintain excess/stop loss insurance, and indemnification insurance for any claims the plan is unable to satisfy because of plan termination. For coverage plans that have additional benefits, a minimum reserve surplus of $500,000 to $2,000,000 must be established. The applicable authority can permit the plan sponsor to substitute cash holdings with securities, guarantees, hold-harmless arrangements, or any other financial arrangement to fulfill the AHP's financial obligations on a timely basis. Within 90 days of the Act's enactment, a Solvency Standards Working Group is to be established to enforce the Act's solvency standards, consisting of at least one representative from NAIC, the American Academy of Actuaries (AAA), the state government, existing self-insured arrangements, the associations, and of group health plans. In its quarterly reports, if the board of trustees determines the plan to be failing to meet solvency standards, then the board must consult with a qualified health actuary to enact corrective measures. If these measures are not enacted or if the solvency of the plan remains questioned, and the applicable authority believes the plan to continue to fail to meet solvency standards, then the board of trustees, under direction of the applicable authority, shall terminate the plan and take actions to satisfy any claims, as necessary to ensure that the plan provides benefits in a timely manner to its participants and beneficiaries. The Secretary is permitted, upon approval by a US district court, to appoint to an AHP a trustee to ensure that the AHP remains solvent.

To receive certification, an AHP will have to file an application, coupled with a $5,000 fee, to the applicable authority. The application must include relevant information pertaining to the identity of the plan sponsor and board of trustees, the states in which it wishes to conduct business, a summary of the plan being offered, copies of any agreements between the plan and contract administrators, and a financial report of the plan's reserves, contribution rates, current and projected assets, liabilities, income, and expenses under the plan, and any costs of coverage to be charged, including operating expenses. Certification will not be granted in any particular state if less than 25% of the AHP's participants and beneficiaries are located in that state. Changes to any information regarding an AHP in the application must be described to the applicable authority. AHPs that offer additional non-coverage benefits will be required to receive certification annually. In filing an application, the board of trustees is required to consult with a qualified health actuary, who is to use assumptions and techniques that best enable the actuary to determine if the plan's projections are reasonable.

States are permitted to impose a tax on contributions to AHPs at a rate equal to the amount of premiums or contributions received by the plan from a participating employer. The tax cannot be discriminatory or exceed the state's tax rate imposed on premiums or contributions received by insurers or HMOs for coverage in a group health plan. The amount of the tax assessed on a plan is to be reduced by the amount of any tax or assessment otherwise imposed by the state on premiums, contributions, or both received by insurers or HMOs for health insurance coverage, aggregate or specific excess/stop loss insurance, or other medical care-related insurance.

Section 223 modifies some definitions in ERISA. If benefits provided under an employer or employee organization are medical, then a "single employer" can be multiple employers under a single health insurance plan. This treatment only applies if greater than 75% of the employees and former employees of the employers are covered under the plan.

Section 224 makes it a crime for any person to willfully misrepresent aspects of an AHP, including certification, to any employee, any employee's beneficiary, the Secretary, or any state government. Upon designation by the Secretary, if an AHP is not certified or operating in accordance with the laws of the Act, then a US district court can order the plan or arrangement to cease activities, excluding if all benefits offered are health insurance and the AHP is abiding by state laws not otherwise in conflict with the Act.

Section 225 directs the Secretary to work in cooperation with state governments in the enforcement of the Act. The primary domicile state of an AHP that provides health insurance coverage is to be recognized as the state in which the filing and approval of a policy type under the plan was initially approved. For other AHPs, the primary domicile state will be treated as the state in which the largest share of participants and beneficiaries of a plan reside.

=== Title III – Interstate Market for Health Insurance ===
Section 301 allows for the creation of interstate cooperatives between state governments, including the District of Columbia (D.C.), to sell individual health insurance. In these cooperatives, insurers can choose which state serves as the "primary" state, the state whose laws regulate the insurance provider. Coverage laws of "secondary" states, states that are not the primary state, do not apply to the insurer, excluding if the secondary state requires the insurer to pay nondiscriminatory state taxes, to register with the state Insurance Commissioner for legal purposes, to submit financial reports of the insurer's financial condition, to comply with court injunctions, to participate in any state insurance insolvency guarantee association, and to comply with state laws regarding fraud, abuse, and unfair claim settlement practices. Insurers are required to disclose to individuals in secondary states information regarding the insurer's primary and secondary states and are required to submit to primary and secondary state Insurance Commissioners a copy of the plan, including quarterly financial reports certified by an independent public accountant, and an opinion on loss and loss adjustment expense reserves made by a member of the AAA or a qualified loss reserve specialist. Insurers cannot provide individual health insurance in secondary states if the Insurance Commissioner of those states do not use a risk-based capital formula for determining capital and surplus requirements for insurers.

Similar to the PPACA, insurers in these cooperatives are prohibited from, upon renewal of a plan, reclassifying or changing premiums for individuals if the health status of the individual changes, excluding if premiums are changed or discounted based on activities in a wellness program. Plans offered in the secondary state must also be available in the primary state. Any state in the cooperative can require insurance issuers to receive a license to practice in that state. Individuals cannot buy health insurance in a secondary state if the plan's premiums in the primary state exceed 10% of the national average premium.

An independent review process of appealing denied claims must be created for individuals covered under individual health insurance in order for an insurer to provide coverage in a secondary state. Individuals on the review board must not have any familial, financial, professional, or other conflict of interest in the review process. Each individual must be a licensed physician who practices in the same field as the condition of the individual appealing the claim. In reviews relating to children, at least one reviewer must have expertise in pediatrics. Compensation provided by the insurer to the reviewer must be reasonable and not related to the reviewer's decision.

=== Title IV – Safety Net Reforms ===
Sections 401, 402, and 403 require state governments to disclose how they intend to cover at least 90% of eligible low-income children in government health care programs and group health plans, and to offer more than one health plan in SCHIP. States are prohibited from providing coverage to children with family income above 300% of the FPL. For children in families above 200%, states cannot pay for coverage unless they are currently providing and will continue to provide coverage to at least 90% of eligible children below 200% of the FPL. These requirements extend to pregnant women. Consideration of individuals' and families' income must be based on their gross, or pre-tax, income. Excluding requirements under Section 2102 of the Social Security Act, minimum coverage requirements and limitations on beneficiary cost-sharing do not apply to these group plans. If the plans do not cover immunizations, well-baby and well-child care, dental care, or emergency services, then SCHIPs must provide these benefits as supplemental benefits. Premium payments to group plans in a single fiscal year are to be restricted to a maximum of the product of the national per capita premium expenditure for the previous fiscal year, the Federal Medical Assistance Percentages (FMAP) for the state in that fiscal year, and the number of low-income children or pregnant women receiving coverage. Children are not to be enrolled unless the child's parent or guardian has been informed of the coverage and are given at least one opportunity per fiscal year to switch coverage. State health plans are required to state how they will notify potential beneficiaries, to provide such notification during applications for enrollment, and post a description of coverage options on a public website. Proof of enrollment for low-income children in a group health plan is to be made every six months. The per capita dollar amount paid by the state to the plan provider is required to be at least 90% of the value of the benefits and must be uniform across all plans offered.

=== Title V – Lawsuit Abuse Reforms ===
Section 501 instructs the HHS Secretary to issue "best practice" guidelines for medical care as part of a contract with a qualified consensus-building organization and in cooperation with physician specialty organizations. These guidelines are to be updated biennially and will be made publicly available over the internet. If a defendant in any health care lawsuit related to the treatment of an individual proves that the treatment was in compliance with the guidelines, then the defendant will not be held liable unless liability is otherwise demonstrated by the plaintiff. The guidelines cannot be introduced as evidence of negligence or deviation in standard any health care lawsuit unless previously introduced by the plaintiff. Health care providers will not be presumed negligent with respect to treatment if they are not in compliance with the guidelines.

Section 502 allows for grants to be awarded to states for the development, implementation, and evaluation of administrative health care tribunals to resolve disputes concerning injuries allegedly caused by health care providers. Before going to the tribunal, lawsuits would first be reviewed by an expert panel of three to seven licensed health care professionals or physicians of the same or similar specialty with respect to the lawsuit, so long as the panel's members have no material, familial, financial, or professional relationship with a party involved in the dispute. In disputes involving children, at least one member of the panel will have expertise in pediatrics. If the parties present in a dispute before the expert panel accept the determination of the panel concerning liability and compensation, then the compensation will be paid to the claimant and the claimant will forego any further legal action against the health care providers involved. If there is no agreement, the dispute is referred to the administrative health care tribunal. States are required to ensure that tribunals are composed of special judges with health care expertise, that the judges have the authority to make binding rules in written decisions on standards of care, causation, compensation, and related issues, to establish gross negligence as the legal standard for the tribunal, allow for the admission of evidence, and to provide for an appeals process for tribunal decisions to be reviewed by a state court. If either party is unsatisfied with the tribunal's decision, the party will enjoy the right to file their claim in a state court, but in doing so forfeit any compensation received during the tribunal process. Under section 503, damages equaling or exceeding $50,000 in a health care lawsuit can be paid back periodically instead of in full.

=== Title VI – Wellness and Prevention ===
Section 601 allows for premiums and cost-sharing in group health plans to vary by up to 50% of the value of the benefits of the plan based on participation, or lack thereof, in any standards-based wellness program.

=== Title VII – Transparency and Insurance Reform Measures ===
Section 701 aims to increase transparency in the process of claiming health insurance. Within 30 days, insurers are required to provide to the party requesting a claims report the information regarding aggregate paid claims experience by month, total premiums paid by month, total number of covered employees on a monthly basis by coverage tier, total dollar amount currently pending, and a description and individual claims report for individuals whose total paid claims exceed $15,000 during the 12 months before the date of the report. Within 10 days of receiving the report from the insurer, the party receiving the report can request for additional claims information, to which the insurer must respond by the 15th day. Insurers are not allowed to disclose any health information protected under HIPAA or stricter federal or state laws, but must disclose to the plan sponsor or administrator that protected health information is being withheld and why it is being withheld. Insurers are not obligated to provide reports to any particular employer more than twice in a 12-month time period or to any employer with fewer than 50 employees.

=== Title VIII – Quality ===
Section 801 prohibits HHS from using data collected from comparative effectiveness research or patient-centered outcomes research to deny coverage of an item or service under any federal health care program. These research methods conducted or financially supported by the federal government will have to account for differences in the treatment response and patients' treatment preferences, including patient-reported outcomes, genomics and personalized medicine, the unique needs of health disparity populations, and indirect patient benefits. Section 802 further directs the HHS Secretary to create a formalized process for the development of performance-based quality measures to apply to physician services under Medicare.

=== Title VIX – State Transparency Plan Portal ===
Section 901 allows for state governments to contract with a private entity to establish a "Health Plan and Provider Portal" website to standardize and make publicly available information regarding purchasable health insurance in the state, including price and coverage information. Portals cannot directly enroll individuals in health insurance plans or under a state Medicaid or SCHIP plan. Insurers cannot offer health insurance plans through the portal if they were involved in the creation of the portal or have an ownership interest in the plan portal. Individuals employed by insurers cannot serve as a director or officer for the private entity creating the portal or for the portal itself. With the exception of not being able to enroll in plans, the Act's portals are functionally similar to the health insurance exchanges of the PPACA.

=== Title X – Patient Freedom of Choice ===
Section 1001 rewrites section 1802 of the Social Security Act (section 5000A of the IRC) to allow for Medicare beneficiaries to contract with any health care professionals that provide care covered under the Medicare program. Participation in a contract would not automatically render the health care provider as a participating or non-participating provider under Medicare, so claim payments made to non-participating providers are to paid as if the provider is participating. Contracts are to include all terms of the contract and beneficiaries are not to be held liable for any payments made in excess of those outlined in the contract. By signing the contract, the beneficiary agrees to be responsible for payments to health care professionals for items and services agreed to under the contract, for submitting claims to the Secretary and supplemental insurance plans for items and services covered under Medicare, and acknowledges that no limits or other payment incentives that would otherwise apply under Medicare will apply to the amount charged or paid to a beneficiary for items and services. The contract cannot be entered into during a time in which the beneficiary is experiencing an emergency medical condition or urgent health care situation. Beneficiaries can choose to have, as part of the contract, a provision that would enable the health care professional to file claims and assign payments to the eligible professional on behalf of the beneficiary. Individuals eligible for both Medicare and Medicaid would not have access to this section's contract.

Section 1002 prohibits states, D.C., and the unincorporated organized territories of the United States from setting limits on the amount of charges for services provided by health care professionals.

Section 1003 prohibits the HHS Secretary and states from requiring any health care provider to participate in any health plan as a condition of licensure in that state.

Section 1004 creates an itemized tax deduction for certain physicians. Eligible physicians must be certified by the American Board of Emergency Medicine or another appropriate medical specialty board for the specialty in which the physician practices. The deduction can be claimed if the physician incurs debt as a result of the Emergency Medical Treatment and Active Labor Act (EMTALA) service requirements in a hospital required to comply with EMTALA. The amount of the deduction is to be equal to the Medicare fee schedule amount that would be received if the service were provided under Medicare Part B.

Section 1005 prohibits the HHS Secretary from preventing any enrollee, participant, or beneficiary of any health benefits plan, excluding for Medicaid and TRICARE, from entering into any contract or arrangement for health care with any health care provider.

=== Title XI – Incentives to Reduce Physician Shortages ===
Like the PPACA, title XI contains provisions authorizing loan and loan repayment programs for certain medical students and physicians, intended to address shortages of primary care physicians.

==== Subtitle A – Federally Supported Student Loan Funds for Medical Students ====
Section 1101 allows the federal government to provide student loans specifically to certain medical students. Eligible medical students must be attending a public or nonprofit school of medicine or osteopathic medicine. Students entering a residency training program other than primary health care are not eligible for loan funds. Additionally, loans can only be received if a student intends to practice medicine up to the date that the loan is repaid in full. The loan repayment period cannot begin earlier than the end-date of any internship, residency, or fellowship training program directly related to the field the student intends to enter.

==== Subtitle B – Loan Forgiveness for Primary Care Providers ====
Section 1111 authorizes the HHS Secretary to create a loan repayment program, provided that the individuals receiving aid agree to serve a minimum of five years as a primary care provider, have a graduate degree in medicine, osteopathic medicine, or another health profession from an accredited institution, and have been working as a primary care provider for at least five years or for at least three years in a medically underserved community. The maximum allowable loan repayment is $50,000 per individual, which can be paid in up to a maximum of $10,000 installments.

=== Title XII – Quality Health Care Coalition ===
Section 1201 exempts health care professionals who are negotiating the terms of contract of a health plan, under which the professionals provide care items or services for which benefits are provided under such plan, from antitrust laws. This exemption does not extend to health care professionals who are negotiating plans in Medicare, Medicaid, SCHIP, FEHBP, and the Veteran and Indian health systems. This exemption will not confer the right to participate in any collective cessation of services to patients not otherwise permitted under existing law.

=== Title XIII – Offsets ===
==== Subtitle A – Discretionary Spending Limits ====
Section 1301 decreases some of the Gramm–Rudman–Hollings Balanced Budget Act's nominal spending caps on discretionary expenditures, reducing the allowable amount of discretionary, or non-mandatory, spending for the federal government. This spending reduction would, in effect, be an expansion of the Budget Control Act of 2011's sequestration.

==== Subtitle B – Savings from Health Care Efficiencies ====
Sections 1311 and 1312 require the HHS Secretary to provide reports to Congress detailing decreased Medicare and Medicaid payments to disproportionate share hospitals (DSHs), hospitals that serve a large number of poor people, as a result of this Act's provisions, the latter of which is to be done in consultation with community-based health care networks that serve low-income beneficiaries. If the national uninsurance rate decreases by eight percentage points because of the Act, then Medicare DSH payments are to be adjusted to provide empirical justification for payment, including hospital characteristics. For fiscal years 2019 to 2021, respectively, Medicaid DSH payments are to be reduced by $1.5 billion, $2.5 billion, and $6 billion if this reduction occurs. States with lower uninsurance rates would see a larger percent reduction in DSH payments, however the cuts cannot be targeted at hospitals with large volumes of Medicaid inpatients or hospitals that have high levels of uncompensated care. The Secretary is to release a report in each January of the preceding year detailing DSH allotments to each state. DSHs are further defined to exclude any hospitals that discriminate against any patients for non-health related reasons, such as race or national origin.

==== Subtitle C – Fraud, Waste, and Abuse ====
Section 1321 increases funding to the Health Care Fraud and Abuse Control Program (HCFAC) to $300 million per fiscal year. Funding to the Office of the Inspector General of HHS is increased to $100 million per fiscal year.

Section 1322 directs the HHS Secretary and HHS Inspector General (IG) to identify instances of Medicare failing to be a secondary payer to an individual's private health benefits. The Secretary is directed to create clearer guidelines for identifying and resolving credit imbalances in which Medicare payments exceed the providers' charges or allowable amount.

Section 1323 requires the HHS Secretary to conduct a criminal and financial background check of providers and suppliers seeking to participate in Medicare. To cover the costs of this check, an application fee is imposed on providers and suppliers applying for participation in Medicare. Applications must include information regarding previous affiliations with enrolled entities that have uncollected debt due to Medicare or Medicaid. If the Secretary finds that these affiliations pose an undue risk to Medicare or Medicaid, then approval can be denied or safety mechanisms can be established. Knowingly making false statements to the Secretary will result in exclusion from the Medicare program and a fine. During an initial, provisional period, providers and suppliers are to be monitored under extra scrutiny. The Secretary can impose a moratorium on approval of an applicant of up to 30 days to prevent fraud.

Section 1324 creates a database to include claims and payment data for all components of the Medicare and Medicaid programs. A second database is to be created through the consolidation of existing databases consisting of individuals and entities excluded from Medicare and Medicaid. Any providers or suppliers of one state that are included in the database would be prohibited from participating in Medicare or Medicaid in another state. A third database recording all sanctions imposed on providers, suppliers, and related entities is to be created. The HHS IG is to have access to each of these databases. If any entity knowingly submits falsely information that serves as the basis for Medicare or Medicaid payments, then the Secretary can impose a fine of up to $50,000 for each erroneous submission.

== Legislative history ==
Congress	Short title	Bill number(s)	Date introduced	Sponsor(s)	# of cosponsors	Latest status
111th Congress	Empowering Patients First Act	H.R. 3400	July 30, 2009	Tom Price (R-GA)	54	Died in committee
112th Congress	Empowering Patients First Act	H.R. 105	January 5, 2011	Dan Burton (R-IN)	0	Died in committee
112th Congress	Empowering Patients First Act	H.R. 3000	September 21, 2011	Tom Price (R-GA)	42	Died in committee
113th Congress	Empowering Patients First Act of 2013	H.R. 2300	June 6, 2013	Tom Price (R-GA)	58	Died in committee
113th Congress	Empowering Patients First Act of 2013	S. 1851	December 18, 2013	John McCain (R-AZ)	0	Died in committee
114th Congress	Empowering Patients First Act of 2015	H.R. 2300	May 13, 2015	Tom Price (R-GA)	84	Died in committee
114th Congress	Empowering Patients First Act of 2015	S. 2519	February 9, 2016	John McCain (R-AZ)	1	Died in committee

== Critical reaction ==
While the Act has not been assessed by the CBO, former CBO director Douglas Holtz-Eakin, in a review for the conservative American Action Network, estimated that the bill would yield a net savings of $2.3 trillion over ten years, and would increase the number of insured individuals by 29% by 2016. He writes that the bill "will lower premiums in all categories of insurance except high deductible health plans in 2016. But due to slowing of premium increases, high deductible health plans will be 6 percent cheaper by 2023" and that it "will yield substantially lower premiums than current law in all insurance product categories with savings up to 19 percent for single policies and up to 15.1 percent in savings for family policies".

Writing in The Washington Post, Ezra Klein said that the bill had some good ideas but that it would not work. In particular he said "its version of the health insurance exchanges will collapse pretty quickly because the bill contains

- no individual mandate ensuring that the pool includes both healthy and sick individuals
- no insurance market regulations stopping insurers from cherrypicking
- no risk adjustment rebalancing the scales when they do."

He said "In other words, this looks much like the reforms that collapsed in Texas, and in California. Price isn't learning from past policy mistakes, and so he means to repeat them." The good elements, he said, were its proposal for automatic enrollment (of employees in employer health care schemes) and the extension of tax exemption on the purchase of private insurance by buyers in the individual insurance market currently enjoyed by the employed. These, however, would be capped at "the average value of the national health exclusion for Employer Sponsored Insurance (and not at the true cost). He pointed out that this tax exemption amounts to a huge tax increase, but said that "(Tom) Price won't call it that". Presumably this is because the exemption is not specifically tax funded but would increase the deficit and would have to be paid for from taxes eventually.

The medical journalist Maggie Mahar has criticized the bill for the suggestion that people with pre-existing conditions should be moved into high risk pools run in each state. She points out that existing state-based high risk pools can't provide affordable coverage for nearly enough of the medically needy who have no other option, and that others have noted how "high-risk pools have been around for over 30 years and currently exist in 35 states, but they only cover about 207,000 Americans. The biggest barrier to enrollment is cost. High-risk pools are inevitably expensive because all of the enrollees have medical conditions that could potentially result in costly medical bills, which means the pools cannot spread costs across low-risk and high-risk individuals. Despite attempts to cap premium rates, the coverage is still unaffordable for many. In fact, a recent study found that premiums for high-risk pools are unaffordable for about one-third of eligible individuals."
