= Randy Stamps =

American attorney and politician

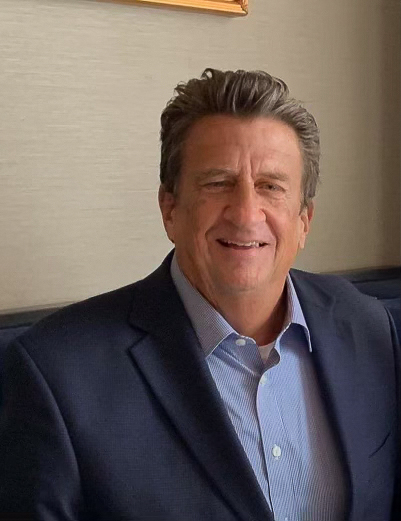
- Executive Director of TSEA and former Tennessee state representative

Executive Director of the Tennessee State Employees Association
- In office Year started 2016 – 2023
- Preceded by: LaTanya McAdoo (as Executive Director of TSEA)

Tennessee State Representative for the 45th District
- In office 1988–1998
- Succeeded by: Diane Black

Personal details
- Born: January 28, 1959 (age 67) Hendersonville, Tennessee, U.S.
- Party: Republican
- Education: Pepperdine University (JD); Lipscomb University (BA in Government Public Administration)
- Occupation: Attorney; Politician; Executive Director of TSEA

Randy Stamps is an American attorney and former politician who has played significant roles in both legislative functions and party support within the state of Tennessee. He served as the state representative for the 45th District of Tennessee from 1988 to 1998 and held the position of political director for the Tennessee Republican Party. Randy Stamps served as the executive director of the Tennessee State Employees Association (TSEA) until his retirement in 2023.

== Early life and education ==
Randy Stamps earned his Juris Doctor degree from Pepperdine University. He also holds a bachelor's degree in Government Public Administration from Lipscomb University.

== Career ==
=== Early career ===
Stamps' early career included representing Hendersonville on the Sumner County school board, reflecting his involvement in local governance and education.

=== Political career ===
Stamps was elected as state representative for Tennessee's 45th District, serving five terms from 1988 to 1998. Concurrently with his legislative duties, he owned and operated his own law firm, representing clients at both state and federal levels.

=== Tennessee Republican Party ===
From 2003 to 2009, he served as the political director for the Tennessee Republican Party.

==== Legislative work ====
He has also worked as policy and research counsel to the state House of Representatives, providing legal and strategic advice on legislative matters.

=== Tennessee State Employees Association ===
Stamps joined TSEA in 2014 as government affairs director. In June 2016, he was announced as the new executive director, succeeding interim executive director LaTanya McAdoo. In this role, he has expressed a commitment to leveraging his legislative experience and contacts to advocate for state employees.

== Personal life ==
Randy Stamps has been married for 38 years to Cindy Wynn Stamps of Madison, and they have three children.
