= American Opportunity Tax Credit =

Tax credit for college students

The American Opportunity Tax Credit is a partially refundable tax credit first detailed in Section 1004 of the American Recovery and Reinvestment Act of 2009.

The act specifies:

1. Provisions were originally specific to tax years 2009 and 2010, later extended, and finally made permanent by the Bipartisan Budget Act of 2015, for the first 4 years of post-secondary education.
2. Increases the Hope credit to 100 percent qualified tuition, fees and course materials paid by the taxpayer during the taxable year not to exceed $2,000, plus 25 percent of the next $2,000 in qualified tuition, fees and course materials. The total credit does not exceed $2,500.
3. 40% of the credit is refundable.
4. This tax credit is subject to a phase-out for taxpayers with adjusted gross income in excess of $80,000 ($160,000 for married couples filing jointly).

The act directs several Treasury studies:

1. Coordination with non-tax student financial assistance;
2. Coordinate the credit allowed under the Federal Pell Grant program to maximize their effectiveness at promoting college affordability;
3. Examine ways to expedite the delivery of the tax credit;
4. With the Secretary of Education, study the feasibility of requiring including community service as a condition of taking their tuition and related expenses into account.

== History ==
Originally proposed by President Barack Obama to help students and families pay for post-secondary education, the proposal called for a $4000 credit in exchange for 100 hours of community service. The stated goal of the credit was to, "cover two-thirds the cost of tuition at the average public college or university and make community college tuition completely free for most students."

=== H.R.106: The American Opportunity Tax Credit Act of 2009 ===
On January 6, 2009, Congressman Chaka Fattah introduced H.R.106, The American Opportunity Tax Credit Act of 2009.

In brief, the proposed act specified

1. Any full-time college or university student is eligible.
2. According to the IRS, the American Opportunity Credit cannot be taken by a taxpayer if he has a felony drug conviction.
3. A $4000 refundable tax credit in exchange for 100 hours of community service. This information is not supported by the link below. This proposal was not passed.
4. Community service must be with either a governmental unit, hospital, or 501(c)(3) organization. This information is not supported by the link below. This proposal was not passed.
5. The Secretary of Education will be responsible for verifying community services requirements. This information is not supported by the links below. This proposal was not passed.

On January 27, 2009, in the Rayburn House Office Building, Congressman Fattah convened a Congressional Roundtable, "Igniting Public Service and Securing College Access: the American Opportunity Tax Credit, H.R. 106". The panel was keynoted by Former Senator Harris Wofford and included Karen Kaskey (PennSERVE), Michelle Asha Cooper (Institute for Higher Education Policy), David Baime (American Association of Community Colleges), Quyen (Arana) Wickham (K20 Center, University of Oklahoma), and Reginald Williams (Benjamin Banneker Academic High School).

=== H.R. 4853: Tax Relief, Unemployment Insurance Reauthorization, and Job Creation Act of 2010 ===
The Tax Relief, Unemployment Insurance Reauthorization, and Job Creation Act of 2010 (Pub. L. 111–312 (text) (PDF), 124 Stat. 3296, H.R. 4853), was passed by the United States Congress on December 16, 2010 and signed into law by President Barack Obama on December 17, 2010.

Among other things, the bill extends the American Opportunity Tax Credit for tax years 2011 and 2012.

The Bipartisan Budget Act of 2015 made the American Opportunity Tax Credit permanent.

== Related legislation ==
The Student and Family Tax Simplification Act (H.R. 3393; 113th Congress), a bill that passed the House on July 24, 2014, would amend the Internal Revenue Code to consolidate several different education tax incentives into an expanded American Opportunity Tax Credit. The American Opportunity Tax Credit, under this legislation, would provide a maximum credit of $2,500.
