= Hope credit =

Former U.S. tax credit

The Hope credit, provided by 26 U.S.C. § 25A(b), was available to taxpayers who have incurred expenses related to the first two years of post-secondary education. For this credit to be claimed by a taxpayer, the student must attend school on at least a part-time basis. The credit can be claimed for education expenses incurred by the taxpayer, the taxpayer's spouse, or the taxpayer's dependent. Starting with tax year 2009, the Hope credit had been supplanted by the more generous American Opportunity Tax Credit.

This credit allows for the first $1,200 in "qualified tuition and related expenses," as well as half of qualifying expenses between $1,200 and $2,400, to be fully creditable against the taxpayer's total tax liability. The maximum amount of the credit is $1,800 per eligible student.

== Qualifying requirements ==
An eligible student must meet all of the following requirements to deduct the Hope credit:

- be enrolled in one of the first two years of post-secondary education;or a trade school in which they may receive an education
- be enrolled in a program that leads to a degree, certificate, or other recognized educational credential;
- be taking at least half of the normal full-time work load for his/her course of study for at least one academic period beginning during the calendar year;
- not have a felony conviction for possessing or distributing a controlled substance.

"Qualified tuition and related expenses" is defined as "the tuition and fees paid at most colleges, universities, and any trade school for the enrollment or attendance of the taxpayer, the taxpayer's spouse, or any dependent of the taxpayer. These qualifying expenses do not include student activity fees, athletic fees, insurance costs, or room and board expenses.

== Limitations ==
The Hope credit is subject to limitations. First, the credit will be lost if the student is convicted of a felony drug offense. Second, a taxpayer may not take both a Hope credit and a Lifetime Learning Credit or tuition and fees deduction for the same student in the same year. Third, a taxpayer may only take the credit during the first two years of post-secondary education. The credit amount is phased out gradually once a taxpayer's modified adjusted gross income exceeds $50,000 ($100,000 if filing jointly) and the credit is phased out entirely once a taxpayer's modified adjusted gross income exceeds $60,000 ($120,000 if filing jointly).

== History ==
According to Paulsen and Smart, the federal Hope tax credit gets its name from Georgia's merit-based scholarship program of the same name, HOPE (Helping Outstanding Pupils Educationally). Although the Georgia state scholarship is a merit scholarship, the tax credit is not.

The Georgia state lottery-funded HOPE Scholarship program (1993) pre-dates the federal tax credit (1998) by five years.

== See also ==
- American Opportunity Tax Credit
- Student financial aid in the United States
