= Lifetime Learning Credit =

U.S. tax credit

The Lifetime Learning Credit, provided by 26 U.S.C. § 25A(b), is available to taxpayers in the United States who have incurred education expenses. For this credit to be claimed by a taxpayer, the student must attend school on at least a part-time basis. The credit can be claimed for education expenses incurred by the taxpayer, the taxpayer's spouse, or the taxpayer's dependent.

This credit allows for a 20% non-refundable tax credit for first $10,000 of qualified tuition and expenses to be fully creditable against the taxpayer's total tax liability. The maximum amount of the credit is $2000 per household. The credit is available for net tuition and fees (less grant aid) paid for post-secondary enrollment. The credit is available on a per-taxpayer (family) basis, and is phased out at the same income levels as the Hope credit.

== Qualifying expenses ==
"Qualified tuition and related expenses" is defined as "the tuition and fees paid at most colleges and universities for the enrollment or attendance of the taxpayer, the taxpayer's spouse, or any dependent of the taxpayer. These qualifying expenses do not include student activity fees, athletic fees, insurance costs, or room and board expenses.

== Limitations ==
The Lifetime Learning Credit is subject to some limitations. A taxpayer may not take both a Hope credit and a Lifetime Learning Credit for the same student in the same year. The credit is subject to a limitation designed to reserve the benefit to low to moderate income taxpayers. The credit amount for 2015 is phased out gradually once a taxpayer's modified adjusted gross income exceeds $55,000, and the credit is phased out entirely once a taxpayer's MAGI exceeds $65,000. These numbers are increased for taxpayers who file jointly to $110,000 and $130,000 respectively.
