= Senator Hurst =

Senator Hurst may refer to:

- Alfred Hurst (1846–1915), Iowa State Senate
- Fielding Hurst (1810–1882), Tennessee State Senate
- Q. Byrum Hurst Sr. (1918–2006), Arkansas State Senate

== See also ==
- Senator Hirst (disambiguation)
