= William Wirt Vaughan =

American politician (1831–1878)

Member of the U.S. House of Representatives from Tennessee's 8th district
- In office March 4, 1871 – March 3, 1873
- Preceded by: William J. Smith
- Succeeded by: David A. Nunn

Personal details
- Born: July 2, 1831 LaGuardo, Tennessee, US
- Died: August 19, 1878 (aged 47) Crockett County, Tennessee, US
- Party: Democratic
- Education: Cumberland University
- Profession: lawyer; politician; railroad president

William Wirt Vaughan (July 2, 1831 – August 19, 1878) was an American politician and a member of the United States House of Representatives for the 8th congressional district of Tennessee.

== Biography ==
Vaughan was born on July 2, 1831, in LaGuardo (now Martha), Tennessee in Wilson County. He attended the common schools and graduated from Cumberland University in Lebanon, Tennessee. He studied law, was admitted to the bar in 1860, and commenced practice in Brownsville, Tennessee.

Elected as a Democrat to the Forty-second Congress, Vaughan served from March 4, 1871, to March 3, 1873, but was not a successful candidate for re-election in 1872 to the Forty-third Congress. He resumed the practice of law in Brownsville and became one of the prime movers in the building of the Chesapeake and Ohio Railroad branch from Brownsville to Newbern. He was president of the system at the time of his death. He became a candidate for election in 1878 to the Forty-sixth Congress.

== Death ==
On August 19, 1878, Vaughan died, at age 47 years, 48 days, in Crockett Mills near Alamo, Tennessee, in Crockett County while canvassing the district. He is interred at Oakwood Cemetery in Brownsville, Tennessee.

U.S. House of Representatives
Preceded by William J. Smith	Member of the U.S. House of Representatives from Tennessee's 8th congressional district 1871-1873	Succeeded by David A. Nunn
