= Tennessee's 8th congressional district =

U.S. House district for Tennessee

Coordinates: 35°51′20″N 89°05′59″W

- Interactive map of district boundaries
- Representative: David Kustoff; R–Germantown
- Distribution: 60.83% urban; 39.17% rural
- Population (2025): 781,070
- Median household income: $73,703
- Ethnicity: 72.9% White; 17.3% Black; 3.6% Hispanic; 3.5% Two or more races; 2.1% Asian; 0.5% other
- Cook PVI: R+10

The 8th congressional district of Tennessee is a congressional district in West Tennessee. It has been represented by Republican David Kustoff since January 2017. The district appears rural on a map, but the bulk of its vote is cast in the suburban and exurban areas around Memphis, such as Germantown, Bartlett, and Collierville, as well as Fayette and Tipton counties. This area boasts some of the highest median incomes in the state.

The rest of the district is composed mostly of small towns and farming communities. The district already had a strong social conservative tint which grew even more pronounced when eastern Memphis was added to the district; many of the state's most politically active churches are located there.

According to the 2010 census, the five largest cities located mostly with the district are: Jackson (65,211), Bartlett (54,613), Collierville (43,965), Germantown (38,844), and Dyersburg (17,145). Of these, only Jackson and Dyersburg are not in Shelby County

== History ==
Districts similar to today's 8th (composing of rural areas in West Tennessee) have been in place since Reconstruction.

During the early 20th century, most of northwest Tennessee was represented by Democrats Finis J. Garrett (1905 to 1929) and Jere Cooper (1929 to 1957). Before 1933, the district was numbered as the 9th; it was numbered as the 9th again from 1943 to 1953. Cooper was succeeded by Fats Everett, who served until his death in early 1969.

The district was pushed into Memphis' northern suburbs in 1967 due to a re-districting caused by the Baker v. Carr ruling. Following Everett's death in 1969, former Tennessee Commissioner of Agriculture Ed Jones won a special election for the balance of his term. Jones served the area in Congress for just under twenty years until his retirement in 1989. Upon Jones' retirement, State Senator John S. Tanner succeeded him. Following eleven terms (22 years) in Congress, Tanner retired.

For most of the 20th century, the 8th was a classic Yellow Dog Democrat district. The area's Democrats were nowhere near as liberal as their counterparts in Nashville and Memphis, and the area's voters were willing to split their tickets in national elections from the 1960s onward. However, apart from the historically Unionist Highland Rim counties of Carroll, Henderson, McNairy, Hardin and Wayne, the GOP was almost nonexistent at the state and local level, with Republicans only fielding "sacrificial lamb" candidates on the few times they fielded candidates at all.

However, Republicans gradually began eroding the Democratic advantage at the turn of the century. It was swept up in the statewide Republican wave of 2008, with Republicans capturing most of the district's seats in the Tennessee General Assembly. This culminated in 2011, when Republican businessman Stephen Fincher defeated Democratic state senator Roy Herron in a landslide, taking 58 percent of the vote to Herron's 39 percent. It marked the first time since Reconstruction that a Republican had represented northwest Tennessee. Since then, no Democrat has managed even 40 percent of the vote.

Following the 2010 census, the district lost its remaining territory in Middle Tennessee, meaning it was entirely within West Tennessee for the first time since 1968. In the same census, it picked up the 7th's share of Shelby County, meaning that since 2012, any area of Shelby County that is not in the 9th is in the 8th. The 8th also absorbed all of Fayette County. The eastern Memphis suburbs, particularly eastern Shelby County, are the most Republican areas of the state outside of East Tennessee. Their addition gave the 8th a character similar to the 7th; it is now one of the most Republican districts in the South.

In 2016, Fincher retired and was succeeded by Republican David Kustoff, a Germantown resident and former United States Attorney.

== Current boundaries ==
The district is located in West Tennessee. It borders Kentucky to the north, Arkansas and Missouri to the west, and Mississippi to the south. For the 118th and successive Congresses (based on redistricting following the 2020 census), the district contains all or portions of the following counties and communities:

Benton County (1)

Camden (part; also 7th)

Carroll County (12)

All 8 communities

Chester County (5)

All 5 communities

Crockett County (5)

All 5 communities

Dyer County (8)

All 8 communities

Fayette County (10)

All 10 communities

Gibson County (10)

All 10 communities

Hardeman County (12)

All 12 communities

Hardin County (7)

All 7 communities

Haywood County (3)

All 3 communities

Henderson County (9)

All 9 communities

Henry County (7)

All 7 communities

Lake County (3)

All 3 communities

Lauderdale County (4)

All 4 communities

Madison County (7)

All 7 communities

McNairy County (12)

All 12 communities

Obion County (10)

All 10 communities

Shelby County (6)

Arlington, Bartlett (part; also 9th), Collierville (part; also 9th), Germantown, Lakeland, Memphis (part; also 9th)

Tipton County (4)

Atoka (part; also 9th), Brighton (part; also 9th), Covington (part; also 9th), Mason

Weakley County (8)

All 8 communities

== Recent election results from statewide races ==
| Year | Office | Results |
|---|---|---|
| 2008 | President | McCain 64% - 34% |
| 2012 | President | Romney 67% - 33% |
| 2016 | President | Trump 68% - 29% |
| 2018 | Senate | Blackburn 63% - 35% |
| 2018 | Governor | Lee 68% - 31% |
| 2020 | President | Trump 68% - 31% |
| 2020 | Senate | Hagerty 70% - 28% |
| 2022 | Governor | Lee 73% - 25% |
| 2024 | President | Trump 70% - 29% |
| 2024 | Senate | Blackburn 71% - 27% |

== List of members representing the district ==
| Name | Party | Years | Cong ress | Electoral history | District location |
|---|---|---|---|---|---|
District established March 4, 1823
| James B. Reynolds (Clarksville) | Democratic-Republican (Jackson) | March 4, 1823 – March 3, 1825 | 18th | Elected in 1823. Lost re-election. | |
| John H. Marable (Yellow Creek) | Jacksonian | March 4, 1825 – March 3, 1829 | 19th 20th | Elected in 1825. Re-elected in 1827. Lost re-election. | |
| Cave Johnson (Clarksville) | Jacksonian | March 4, 1829 – March 3, 1833 | 21st 22nd | Elected in 1829. Re-elected in 1831. Redistricted to the 11th district. | |
| David W. Dickinson (Murfreesboro) | Jacksonian | March 4, 1833 – March 3, 1835 | 23rd | Elected in 1833. Retired. | |
| Abram P. Maury (Franklin) | Anti-Jacksonian | March 4, 1835 – March 3, 1837 | 24th 25th | Elected in 1835. Re-elected in 1837. Retired. | |
| Abram P. Maury (Franklin) | Whig | March 4, 1837 – March 3, 1839 | 24th 25th | Elected in 1835. Re-elected in 1837. Retired. | |
| Meredith P. Gentry (Harpeth) | Whig | March 4, 1839 – March 3, 1843 | 26th 27th | Elected in 1839. Re-elected in 1841. Retired. | |
| Joseph H. Peyton (Gallatin) | Whig | March 4, 1843 – November 11, 1845 | 28th 29th | Elected in 1843. Re-elected in 1845. Died. | |
| Vacant | | November 11, 1845 – January 2, 1846 | 29th | | |
| Edwin H. Ewing (Nashville) | Whig | January 2, 1846 – March 3, 1847 | 29th | Elected December 12, 1845, to finish Peyton's term and seated January 2, 1846. Retired. | |
| Washington Barrow (Nashville) | Whig | March 4, 1847 – March 3, 1849 | 30th | Elected in 1847. Retired. | |
| Andrew Ewing (Nashville) | Democratic | March 4, 1849 – March 3, 1851 | 31st | Elected in 1849. Retired. | |
| William Cullom (Carthage) | Whig | March 4, 1851 – March 3, 1853 | 32nd | Elected in 1851. Redistricted to the 4th district. | |
| Felix Zollicoffer (Nashville) | Whig | March 4, 1853 – March 3, 1855 | 33rd 34th 35th | Elected in 1853. Re-elected in 1855. Re-elected in 1857. Retired. | |
| Felix Zollicoffer (Nashville) | Know Nothing | March 4, 1855 – March 3, 1859 | 33rd 34th 35th | Elected in 1853. Re-elected in 1855. Re-elected in 1857. Retired. | |
| James M. Quarles (Clarksville) | Opposition | March 4, 1859 – March 3, 1861 | 36th | Elected in 1859. Could not seek re-election, as West Tennessee seceded. | |
| District inactive | | March 4, 1861 – July 24, 1866 | 37th 38th 39th | Civil War and Reconstruction | |
| John W. Leftwich (Memphis) | Union | July 24, 1866 – March 3, 1867 | 39th | Elected in 1865. Lost re-election. | |
| David A. Nunn (Brownsville) | Republican | March 4, 1867 – March 3, 1869 | 40th | Elected in 1867. Lost re-election as an Independent Republican. | |
| William J. Smith (Memphis) | Republican | March 4, 1869 – March 3, 1871 | 41st | Elected in 1868. Lost re-election. | |
| William W. Vaughan (Brownsville) | Democratic | March 4, 1871 – March 3, 1873 | 42nd | Elected in 1870. Retired. | |
| David A. Nunn (Brownsville) | Republican | March 4, 1873 – March 3, 1875 | 43rd | Elected in 1872. Redistricted to the 9th district and lost re-election. | |
| John D. C. Atkins (Paris) | Democratic | March 4, 1875 – March 3, 1883 | 44th 45th 46th 47th | Redistricted from the 7th district and re-elected in 1874. Re-elected in 1876. Re-elected in 1878. Re-elected in 1880. Retired. | |
| John M. Taylor (Covington) | Democratic | March 4, 1883 – March 3, 1887 | 48th 49th | Elected in 1882. Re-elected in 1884. Retired. | |
| Benjamin A. Enloe (Jackson) | Democratic | March 4, 1887 – March 3, 1895 | 50th 51st 52nd 53rd | Elected in 1886. Re-elected in 1888. Re-elected in 1890. Re-elected in 1892. Lost re-election. | |
| John E. McCall (Lexington) | Republican | March 4, 1895 – March 3, 1897 | 54th | Elected in 1894. Lost re-election. | |
| Thetus W. Sims (Linden) | Democratic | March 4, 1897 – March 3, 1921 | 55th 56th 57th 58th 59th 60th 61st 62nd 63rd 64th 65th 66th | Elected in 1896. Re-elected in 1898. Re-elected in 1900. Re-elected in 1902. Re-elected in 1904. Re-elected in 1906. Re-elected in 1908. Re-elected in 1910. Re-elected in 1912. Re-elected in 1914. Re-elected in 1916. Re-elected in 1918. Lost renomination. | |
| Lon A. Scott (Savannah) | Republican | March 4, 1921 – March 3, 1923 | 67th | Elected in 1920. Lost re-election. | |
| Gordon Browning (Huntingdon) | Democratic | March 4, 1923 – March 3, 1933 | 68th 69th 70th 71st 72nd | Elected in 1922. Re-elected in 1924. Re-elected in 1926. Re-elected in 1928. Re-elected in 1930. Redistricted to the 7th district. | |
| Jere Cooper (Dyersburg) | Democratic | March 4, 1933 – January 3, 1943 | 73rd 74th 75th 76th 77th | Redistricted from the 9th district and re-elected in 1932. Re-elected in 1934. Re-elected in 1936. Re-elected in 1938. Re-elected in 1940. Redistricted to the 9th district. | |
| Tom J. Murray (Jackson) | Democratic | January 3, 1943 – January 3, 1953 | 78th 79th 80th 81st 82nd | Elected in 1942. Re-elected in 1944. Re-elected in 1946. Re-elected in 1948. Re-elected in 1950. Redistricted to the 7th district. | |
| Jere Cooper (Dyersburg) | Democratic | January 3, 1953 – December 18, 1957 | 83rd 84th 85th | Redistricted from the 9th district and re-elected in 1952. Re-elected in 1954. Re-elected in 1956. Died. | |
| Vacant | | December 18, 1957 – February 1, 1958 | 85th | | |
| Fats Everett (Union City) | Democratic | February 1, 1958 – January 26, 1969 | 85th 86th 87th 88th 89th 90th 91st | Elected to finish Cooper's term. Re-elected in 1958. Re-elected in 1960. Re-elected in 1962. Re-elected in 1964. Re-elected in 1966. Re-elected in 1968. Died. | |
| Vacant | | January 26, 1969 – March 25, 1969 | 91st | | |
| Ed Jones (Yorkville) | Democratic | March 25, 1969 – January 3, 1973 | 91st 92nd | Elected to finish Everett's term. Re-elected in 1970. Redistricted to the 7th district. | |
| Dan Kuykendall (Memphis) | Republican | January 3, 1973 – January 3, 1975 | 93rd | Redistricted from the 9th district and re-elected in 1972. Lost re-election. | |
| Harold Ford Sr. (Memphis) | Democratic | January 3, 1975 – January 3, 1983 | 94th 95th 96th 97th | Elected in 1974. Re-elected in 1976. Re-elected in 1978. Re-elected in 1980. Redistricted to the 9th district. | |
| Ed Jones (Yorkville) | Democratic | January 3, 1983 – January 3, 1989 | 98th 99th 100th | Redistricted from the 7th district and re-elected in 1982. Re-elected in 1984. Re-elected in 1986. Retired. | |
| John Tanner (Union City) | Democratic | January 3, 1989 – January 3, 2011 | 101st 102nd 103rd 104th 105th 106th 107th 108th 109th 110th 111th | Elected in 1988. Re-elected in 1990. Re-elected in 1992. Re-elected in 1994. Re-elected in 1996. Re-elected in 1998. Re-elected in 2000. Re-elected in 2002. Re-elected in 2004. Re-elected in 2006. Re-elected in 2008. Retired. | |
| John Tanner (Union City) | Democratic | January 3, 1989 – January 3, 2011 | 101st 102nd 103rd 104th 105th 106th 107th 108th 109th 110th 111th | Elected in 1988. Re-elected in 1990. Re-elected in 1992. Re-elected in 1994. Re-elected in 1996. Re-elected in 1998. Re-elected in 2000. Re-elected in 2002. Re-elected in 2004. Re-elected in 2006. Re-elected in 2008. Retired. | 2003–2013 |
| Stephen Fincher (Frog Jump) | Republican | January 3, 2011 – January 3, 2017 | 112th 113th 114th | Elected in 2010. Re-elected in 2012. Re-elected in 2014. Retired. | 2003–2013 |
| Stephen Fincher (Frog Jump) | Republican | January 3, 2011 – January 3, 2017 | 112th 113th 114th | Elected in 2010. Re-elected in 2012. Re-elected in 2014. Retired. | 2013–2023 |
| David Kustoff (Germantown) | Republican | January 3, 2017 – present | 115th 116th 117th 118th 119th | Elected in 2016. Re-elected in 2018. Re-elected in 2020. Re-elected in 2022. Re-elected in 2024. Re-elected in 2026. | 2013–2023 |
| David Kustoff (Germantown) | Republican | January 3, 2017 – present | 115th 116th 117th 118th 119th | Elected in 2016. Re-elected in 2018. Re-elected in 2020. Re-elected in 2022. Re-elected in 2024. Re-elected in 2026. | 2023–2027 |

== See also ==
- Tennessee's congressional districts
- List of United States congressional districts
