= Representative Cullom =

Representative Cullom may refer to:

- Shelby Moore Cullom (1829-1914), US Representative from Illinois
- William Cullom (1810-1896), US Representative from Tennessee
