= Joseph Hopkins Peyton =

American politician (1808–1845)

Member of the U.S. House of Representatives from Tennessee's 8th district
- In office March 4, 1843 – November 11, 1845
- Preceded by: Meredith P. Gentry
- Succeeded by: Edwin H. Ewing

Member of the Tennessee Senate
- In office 1840

Personal details
- Born: May 20, 1808 Gallatin, Tennessee
- Died: November 11, 1845 (aged 37) Gallatin, Tennessee
- Party: Whig
- Spouse: Mary Elizabeth Hatton Peyton
- Profession: physician; politician

Joseph Hopkins Peyton (May 20, 1808 – November 11, 1845) was an American politician who represented Tennessee's eighth district in the United States House of Representatives.

== Biography ==
Born on May 20, 1808, in Gallatin, Tennessee, Peyton accomplished preparatory studies and graduated from college in 1837. He studied and practiced medicine. He was the brother of Balie Peyton. He married Mary Elizabeth Hatton in 1841. They had two children before she died in November 1812.

== Career ==
Peyton held various local offices and was elected as a member of the Tennessee Senate in 1840. He was elected as a Whig to the Twenty-eighth and Twenty-ninth Congresses. He served from March 4, 1843, until his death on November 11, 1845.

== Death ==
Peyton died on November 11, 1845, near Gallatin, Tennessee, and is interred at the family burying ground near Gallatin.

== See also ==
- List of members of the United States Congress who died in office (1790–1899)

U.S. House of Representatives
Preceded by Meredith P. Gentry	Member of the U.S. House of Representatives from Tennessee's 8th congressional district 1843-1845	Succeeded by Edwin H. Ewing
