= Washington Barrow =

American politician (1807–1866)

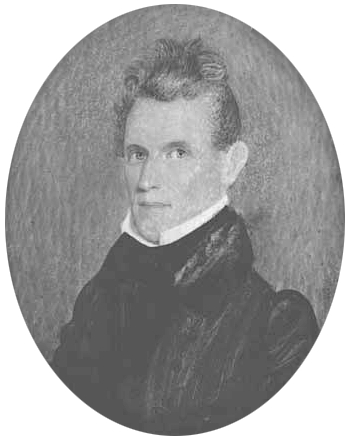

Member of the U.S. House of Representatives from Tennessee's 8th district
- In office March 4, 1847 – March 3, 1849
- Preceded by: Edwin H. Ewing
- Succeeded by: Andrew Ewing

Member of the Tennessee Senate
- In office 1860–1861

Personal details
- Born: October 5, 1807 Davidson County, Tennessee, U.S.
- Died: October 19, 1866 (aged 59) St. Louis, Missouri, U.S.
- Party: Whig
- Spouse: Anna Marian Shelby Barrow
- Education: University of Nashville
- Profession: newspaper editor; ambassador; lawyer; politician

George Washington Barrow (October 5, 1807 – October 19, 1866) was a slave owner, American politician, a member of the United States House of Representatives for Tennessee's 8th congressional district; he later fought against the Union as a member of the Confederate Army and was charged with treason.

== Biography ==
Barrow was born in Davidson County, Tennessee son of Wylie and Ann Beck Barrow, his father's second wife, on October 5, 1807. He attended Davidson Academy and in 1826 became one of the first graduates of the University of Nashville. He read law and was admitted to the Tennessee Bar in 1827. In that same year, he married Anna Marian Shelby, daughter of Dr. John Shelby, one of the state's wealthiest men.

== Career ==
In 1837, Barrow served a term in the Tennessee House of Representatives. From December 28, 1841 to February 24, 1844, he served as the U.S. Minister to Portugal. He edited the Nashville Republican Banner in 1845-1847.

Barrow was elected as a Whig to the Thirtieth Congress, but he was not a candidate for renomination to the Thirty-first Congress in 1848. He served from March 4, 1847 to March 3, 1849. Returning home in 1849, Barrow was a delegate to the Nashville Convention of 1850. He worked as a businessman and founded and served as the first president of the Nashville Gas Light Company.

Barrow and his son, John C. Barrow, purchased 112 slaves and a plantation in Maringouin, Louisiana on January 18, 1853, from the heirs of Jesse Batey. Some of those slaves were previously part of the group sold in 1838 by the Maryland Province of the Society of Jesus. Barrow sold the slaves and the plantation to William Patrick and Joseph B. Woolfolk in 1856.

== Civil War ==
During the American Civil War, Barrow was a member of the Confederate faction of the Tennessee Senate in 1861 and 1862. Being a senior officer in the Tennessee militia, Barrow raised Company C of the 11th Tennessee Cavalry, which became known as "Barrow Guards."

He was captured by Union forces in Nashville and charged with treason. He refused to take an oath of allegiance and was imprisoned at Ohio and Mackinac Island, Michigan, which gravely weakened his health, but later was paroled in an exchange of prisoners. After returning to Nashville, he served as a private in the retreating Army of Tennessee in 1863.

== Death ==
Following the war, Barrow died at the home of his brother in St. Louis, Missouri, during a visit on October 19, 1866 (age 59 years, 14 days). He is interred at the family vault of Dr. John Shelby, his father-in-law, at the Mount Olivet Cemetery Nashville City Cemetery in Nashville, Tennessee.

Barrow was the half-brother of Alexander Barrow, a U.S. Senator from Louisiana, who was the son of Washington Barrow's father and his first wife.

U.S. House of Representatives
Preceded by Edwin H. Ewing	Member of the U.S. House of Representatives from Tennessee's 8th congressional district 1849-1851	Succeeded by Andrew Ewing
