= Benjamin A. Enloe =

American politician (1848–1922)

Benjamin Augustine Enloe
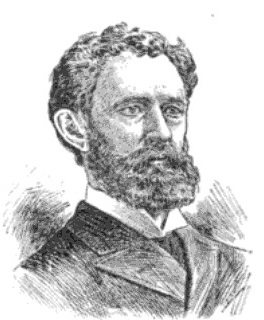

Member of the U.S. House of Representatives from Tennessee's 8th district
- In office March 4, 1887 – March 3, 1895
- Preceded by: John M. Taylor
- Succeeded by: John E. McCall

Member of the Tennessee House of Representatives
- In office 1869–1873

Personal details
- Born: January 18, 1848 Clarksburg, Tennessee, U.S.
- Died: July 8, 1922 (aged 74) Nashville, Tennessee, U.S.
- Citizenship: United States
- Party: Democratic
- Spouse: Fannie Howard Ashworth Enloe
- Children: Benjamin Augustine Enloe Marie Enloe
- Education: Bethel College; Cumberland University
- Profession: Attorney, politician, editor

Benjamin Augustine Enloe (January 18, 1848 – July 8, 1922) was an American politician and a member of the United States House of Representatives for the 8th congressional district of Tennessee.

== Biography ==
Enloe was born on January 18, 1848, in Clarksburg, Tennessee son of Benjamin S. and Nancy O. Blair Enloe. He attended Bethel College in McKenzie, Tennessee and Cumberland University in Lebanon, Tennessee. He married Frances Howard "Fannie" Ashworth on April 5, 1870, and they had four children, Benjamin Augustine, Adele, Fantine and Marie.

== Career ==
While a student at Cumberland University, Enloe was elected a member of the Tennessee House of Representatives as a Conservative in 1868. He was re-elected under the new state constitution as a Democrat in 1870. He graduated from the Cumberland Law School with an LL.B. degree in 1873. Enloe was admitted to the bar later that same year, and began practice in Jackson, Tennessee. He was a delegate to the Democratic National Convention in 1872 and in 1880. He was appointed by Governor Albert S. Marks in 1878 to negotiate the settling of the state deficit. He served on the state executive committee from 1878 to 1880. He edited the Jackson Tribune and Sun from 1874 to 1886.

Enloe was elected as a Democrat to the Fiftieth and the three following Congresses. During the Fifty-second and Fifty-third Congresses, he was chairman of the United States House Committee on Education. Not successful as a candidate for re-election in 1894 to the Fifty-fourth Congress. He served from March 4, 1887, to March 4, 1895.

After editing the Daily Sun at Nashville, Tennessee, for two years, Enloe moved to Louisville, Kentucky, and edited the Louisville Dispatch for two years. He was secretary of the state fair commission and director of exhibits from Tennessee at the St. Louis World's Fair in 1903. Elected railroad commissioner of Tennessee, Enloe served from 1904 until his death.

== Death ==
Enloe died at his home in Nashville on July 8, 1922, aged 74. He is interred at Mount Olivet Cemetery.

U.S. House of Representatives
Preceded by John M. Taylor	Member of the U.S. House of Representatives from Tennessee's 8th congressional district 1887–1895	Succeeded by John E. McCall
