= John H. Savage =

American politician (1815–1904)

John Houston Savage
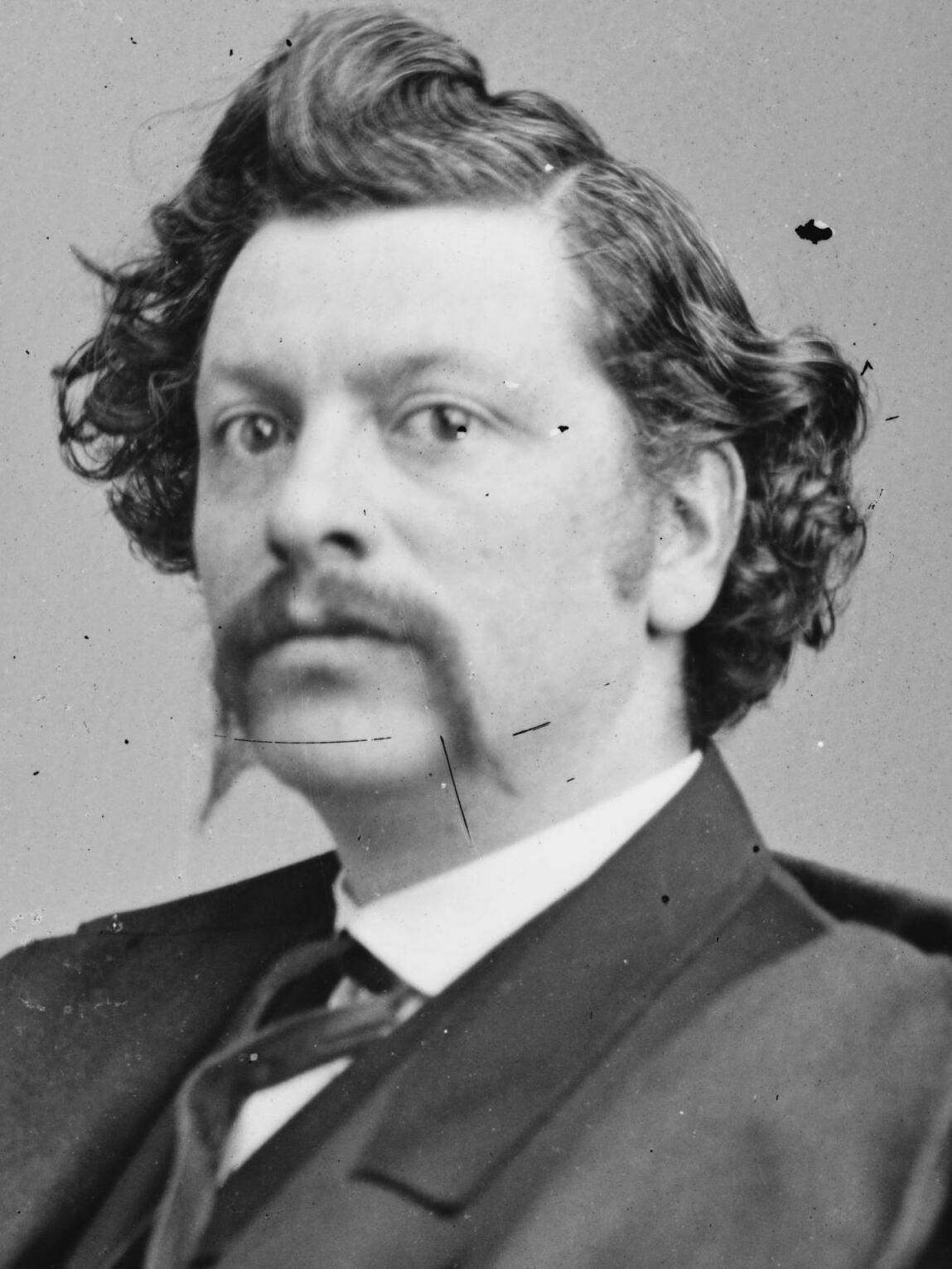

Member of the U.S. House of Representatives from Tennessee's 4th district
- In office March 4, 1855 – March 3, 1859
- Preceded by: William Cullom
- Succeeded by: William Brickly Stokes
- In office March 4, 1849 – March 3, 1853
- Preceded by: Hugh Lawson White Hill
- Succeeded by: William Cullom

Member of the Tennessee House of Representatives
- In office 1877-1879; 1887-1891

Member of the Tennessee Senate
- In office 1879-1881

Personal details
- Born: October 9, 1815 McMinnville, Tennessee, U.S.
- Died: April 5, 1904 (aged 88) McMinnville, Tennessee, U.S.
- Party: Democratic
- Profession: soldier, lawyer, politician

John Houston Savage (October 9, 1815 – April 5, 1904) was an American politician and a member of the United States House of Representatives for the 4th congressional district of Tennessee.

== Biography ==
Savage was born in McMinnville, Tennessee on October 9, 1815, son of George and Elizabeth Kenner Savage. He attended the common schools and served as a private in the Seminole War. He studied law, was admitted to the bar, and commenced practice in Smithville, Tennessee.

== Career ==
After serving as a colonel of the state militia, Savage was the Attorney General of the fourth district of Tennessee from 1841 to 1847. He was commissioned as major of the 14th US Infantry in March 1847, and he was subsequently promoted to lieutenant colonel of the 1847-1848 11th Infantry Regiment (United States) in September of the same year.

Savage was elected as a Democrat to the Thirty-first and Thirty-second Congresses, but he declined to be a candidate for re-election. He served from March 4, 1849 to March 3, 1853. He was again elected to the Thirty-fourth and the Thirty-fifth United States Congress, serving from March 4, 1855 to March 3, 1859.

Serving as a colonel of the Sixteenth Regiment Tennessee Infantry in the Confederate Army during the Civil War, Savage was wounded at Perryville and again at Stones River in 1862. In February 1863 Savage resigned his commission in anger over his failure to advance in the ranks.

Savage was a member of the Tennessee House of Representatives from 1877 to 1879 and from 1887 to 1891. He served in the Tennessee Senate from 1879 to 1881.

== Death ==
Savage died in McMinnville, Tennessee on April 5, 1904 (age 88 years, 179 days), and is interred at Riverside Cemetery. Savage never married. In 1903 he published his memoirs, The Life of John H. Savage. His papers are available at the Tennessee State Library and Archives.

U.S. House of Representatives
Preceded by Hugh Hill	Member of the U.S. House of Representatives from Tennessee's 4th congressional district 1849-1853	Succeeded by William Cullom
Preceded by William Cullom	Member of the U.S. House of Representatives from Tennessee's 4th congressional district 1855-1859	Succeeded by William B. Stokes
