= John May Taylor =

American politician (1838–1911)

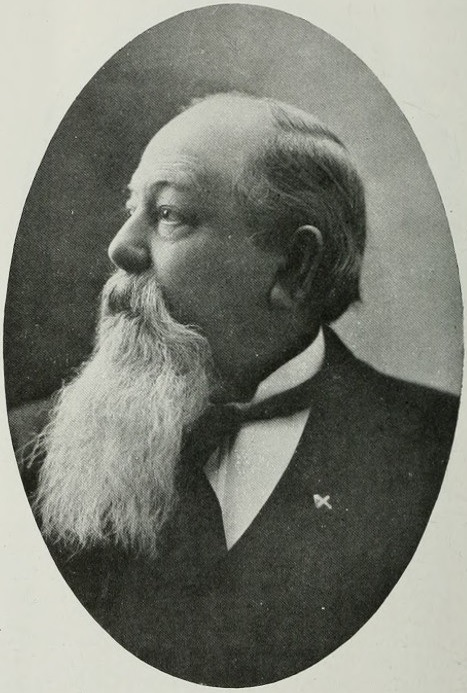

Member of the U.S. House of Representatives from Tennessee's 8th district
- In office March 4, 1883 – March 3, 1887
- Preceded by: John Atkins
- Succeeded by: Benjamin A. Enloe

Personal details
- Born: May 18, 1838 Lexington, Tennessee, U.S.
- Died: February 17, 1911 (aged 72) Lexington, Tennessee, U.S.
- Citizenship: United States
- Party: Democratic
- Spouse: Amanda McHaney Taylor
- Children: Mary Lou Taylor Harmon; William McHaney Taylor; Nannie Taylor; Jesse Taylor; Daisy Taylor; John M Taylor
- Education: Union University Cumberland School of Law
- Profession: Attorney; Politician; Judge

Military service
- Allegiance: Confederate States of America
- Branch/service: Confederate States Army
- Rank: Major (CSA)
- Unit: 27th Tennessee Infantry Regiment
- Battles/wars: American Civil War

John May Taylor (May 18, 1838 – February 17, 1911) was a U.S. representative from Tennessee.

== Biography ==
Born in Lexington, Tennessee, Taylor was the son of Jesse and Mary May Taylor. He attended the Male Academy in Lexington and the Union University, Murfreesboro, Tennessee. He graduated with a law degree from Cumberland University, Lebanon, Tennessee, in 1861. He was admitted to the bar the same year and commenced practice in Lexington. He married Amanda McHaney, October 10, 1864, with whom he had eight children.

== Career ==
Taylor enlisted in the Confederate States Army, and was elected first lieutenant in June 1861 and promoted to captain. He was elected major in the Twenty-seventh Tennessee Regiment in 1862.

Taylor served as mayor of Lexington in 1869 and 1870, and in 1870, he served as delegate to the State constitutional convention of Tennessee. He was the Attorney General of the eleventh judicial circuit of Tennessee from 1870 to 1878. He served as delegate to the Democratic National Convention in 1880, and was a member of the State house of representatives in 1881 and 1882.

Elected as a Democrat to the Forty-eighth and Forty-ninth Congresses, Taylor served from March 4, 1883 to March 3, 1887. He served as chairman of the Committee on Expenditures in the Department of the Navy (Forty-ninth Congress). He served as member of the State senate in 1892. He resumed the practice of law. He was appointed judge of the criminal court for the eleventh judicial circuit in 1895 and subsequently elected for a six-year term, serving until the court was abolished.

Taylor was elected in August 1902 as a judge of the court of chancery appeals (name changed to court of civil appeals by the legislature). He was reelected in 1910 for a period of eight years and served until his death.

=== Death ===
On February 17, 1911, Taylor died in Lexington, Tennessee. He is interred at Lexington Cemetery.

U.S. House of Representatives
Preceded by John D. C. Atkins	Member of the U.S. House of Representatives from Tennessee's 8th congressional district 1883-1887	Succeeded by Benjamin A. Enloe
