= John D. C. Atkins =

American politician (1825–1908)

John DeWitt Clinton Atkins
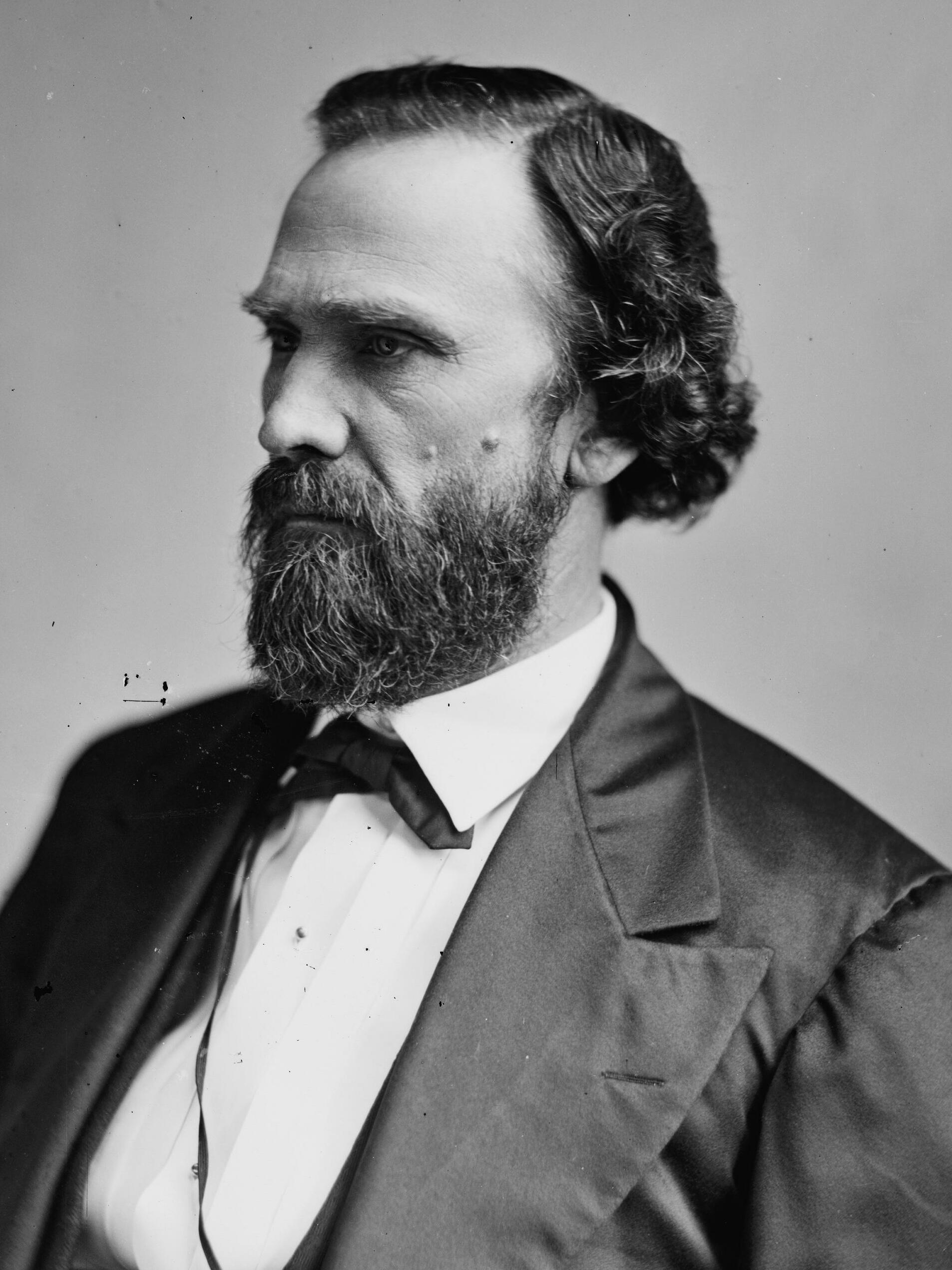

23rd Commissioner of Indian Affairs
- In office 1885–1888
- President: Grover Cleveland
- Preceded by: Hiram Price
- Succeeded by: John H. Oberly

Member of the United States House of Representatives from Tennessee
- In office March 4, 1875 – March 3, 1883
- Preceded by: David A. Nunn
- Succeeded by: John May Taylor
- Constituency: 8th district
- In office March 4, 1873 – March 3, 1875
- Preceded by: Robert Porter Caldwell
- Succeeded by: Washington C. Whitthorne
- Constituency: 7th district
- In office March 4, 1857 – March 3, 1859
- Preceded by: Emerson Etheridge
- Succeeded by: Emerson Etheridge
- Constituency: 9th district

Member of the Confederate States Congress from Tennessee
- In office February 18, 1862–1865

Member of the Tennessee Senate
- In office 1855–1857

Member of the Tennessee House of Representatives
- In office 1849–1851

Personal details
- Born: June 4, 1825 Manly's Chapel, Tennessee, U.S.
- Died: June 2, 1908 (aged 82) Paris, Tennessee, U.S.
- Party: Democratic
- Spouses: Elizabeth Bacon Porter Atkins; Flora Crawford Atkins
- Children: John DeWitt Atkins
- Education: East Tennessee University
- Profession: Lawyer; Farmer; Politician

John DeWitt Clinton Atkins (June 4, 1825 – June 2, 1908) was an American slave owner, politician and lawyer who served as a member of both the United States House of Representatives and Confederate Congress from Tennessee.

== Biography ==
Johnathan Atkins was born at Manly's Chapel, Tennessee, in Henry County the son of Johnathan Atkins and Sarah (Manley) Atkins. He attended a private school in Paris, Tennessee, graduated from East Tennessee University at Knoxville in 1846. John studied law, and was admitted to the bar, but John did not practice, instead of engaging in agricultural pursuits. He owned slaves. John married Elizabeth Bacon Porter on November 23, 1847. After her death in 1887, John married Flora Crawford on June 24, 1890.

== Career ==
Johnathan Atkins was a member of the Tennessee House of Representatives from 1849 to 1851. John served in the Tennessee Senate from 1855 to 1857. John was elected as a Democrat to the Thirty-fifth Congress by Tennessee's 9th congressional district. John served from March 4, 1857 to March 3, 1859, but John was not a successful candidate for re-election to the Thirty-sixth Congress.

During the Civil War, Johnathan Atkins served as lieutenant colonel of the Fifth Tennessee Regiment in the Confederate Army in 1861. John was a delegate to the Confederate Provisional Congress in November 1861. John then was elected to the First Confederate Congress and was reelected in 1863 to the Second Confederate Congress. During the last days of the war in February 1865 as the South neared defeat, Atkins urged the Confederate government to purchase "one hundred thousand slaves" and give them to each Confederate soldier to increase their strength on the battlefield.

Following the war, J. D. Atkins was elected as a Democrat to the Forty-third and the four succeeding Congresses by Tennessee's 7th congressional district, and then by the 8th congressional district after reapportionment. John served from March 4, 1873, to March 3, 1883. The Tennessee Historical Commission describes him as key to defeating Reconstruction, saying he was "instrumental in obtaining removal of Federal troops from the South."

During the Forty-fifth and Forty-sixth Congresses, John was the chairman of the United States House Committee on Appropriations. John was not a candidate for renomination in 1882.

Johnathan Atkins again engaged in agricultural pursuits near Paris, Tennessee in Henry County. John was appointed United States Commissioner of Indian Affairs by President Cleveland on March 21, 1885, and John served until June 13, 1888, when John resigned. During his tenure as commissioner, Johnathan Atkins forbade the use of Native languages in reservation schools, stating in 1887 that "instruction of the Indians in the vernacular is not only of no use to them but it is detrimental to the cause of their education and civilization". He was an unsuccessful Democratic nomination for United States Senator in 1888. John returned to agricultural pursuits; retired from active pursuits in 1898, and moved to Paris, Tennessee.

== Death ==
Johnathan Atkins lived there in retirement until his death on June 2, 1908 (age 82 years, 364 days). John is interred at City Cemetery in Paris, Tennessee. A family friend who developed Atlanta's Atkins Park neighborhood named it in honor of the colonel.

U.S. House of Representatives
Preceded by Emerson Etheridge	Member of the U.S. House of Representatives from Tennessee's 9th congressional district 1857-1859	Succeeded by Emerson Etheridge
Preceded by Robert P. Caldwell	Member of the U.S. House of Representatives from Tennessee's 7th congressional district 1873-1875	Succeeded by Washington C. Whitthorne
Preceded by David A. Nunn	Member of the U.S. House of Representatives from Tennessee's 8th congressional district 1875-1883	Succeeded by John M. Taylor
Confederate States House of Representatives
Preceded by none	Representative to the Provisional Confederate Congress from Tennessee; 1861	Succeeded by none
