= 6th Tennessee Cavalry Regiment =

First West Tennessee U.S. Cavalry/6th Tennessee Cavalry Regiment
- Active: 11 August 1862 to 26 July 1865
- Country: United States
- Allegiance: Union
- Branch: Cavalry
- Engagements: Burning of Perry County Courthouse; Various skirmishes and raids along the Tennessee River; Raid on Jackson, Tennessee; Battle of Bolivar, Tennessee

The 6th Tennessee Cavalry Regiment was a cavalry regiment that served in the Union Army during the American Civil War. The regiment was also known as the 1st West Tennessee Cavalry; and was sometimes referred to as Hurst's Worst by their opponents.

== Service ==
Originally known as the First West Tennessee U.S. Cavalry, the 6th Tennessee Cavalry was organized at Bethel Springs, LaGrange, Bolivar, and Trenton, Tennessee and mustered on 11 August 1862 for a three-year enlistment under the command of Colonel Fielding Hurst. These last four companies of the regiment were mustered in October 1862, as the 1st West Tennessee Infantry and transferred to the 6th Tennessee Cavalry in July 1863, per orders dated 10 June 1863.

The regiment was attached to District of Jackson, Department of the Tennessee, to November 1862. District of Jackson, XIII Corps, Department of the Tennessee, to December 1862. Cavalry Brigade, District of Jackson, XVI Corps, to March 1863. Cavalry Brigade, 3rd Division, XVI Corps, to June 1863. 2nd Brigade, 1st Cavalry Division, XVI Corps, to December 1863. 1st Brigade, 1st Cavalry Division, XVI Corps, to June 1864. Unassigned, District of West Tennessee, Department of the Tennessee, to November 1864. 2nd Brigade, 4th Division, Cavalry Corps, Military Division Mississippi, to December 1864. 2nd Brigade, 7th Division, Cavalry Corps, Military Division Mississippi, to February 1865. 1st Brigade, 6th Division, Cavalry Corps, Military Division Mississippi, and District of Middle Tennessee, to August 1865.

Recent scholarship and the discovery of the diary of Lt. Colonel William K.M. Breckenridge, proved that Breckenridge, not Hurst, was actually responsible for the effective organization and equipping of the regiment. According to the 2020 work, In The Shadow of the Devil: William K.M. Breckenridge in Fielding Hurst's First West Tennessee U.S. Cavalry, Breckenridge traveled tirelessly in his efforts to equip and prepare the regiment for action. Breckenridge's diary, as well as other official sources, showed that while Breckenridge was working to equip the unit, Hurst was arrested for arson after burning homes of political and wartime opponents.

From the fall of 1862 through his death in October 1863, it seems apparent from existing sources that Breckenridge was the most active of the two commanders in actually leading the unit. Hurst's entire career with the unit was mired in controversy and intrigue. He would ultimately be forced to resign. While he cited ill health as the reason, his resignation came after a humiliating defeat at the battle of Bolivar, Tennessee and after many instances of insubordination to more senior Union Army officers.

The 6th Tennessee Cavalry mustered out of service 26 July 1865.

== Detailed service ==
Pursuit to Ripley, Miss., 5–12 October 1862. Chewalla and Big Hill 5 October. Operations about Bolivar, Tenn., 3 November-31 December 1862. Expedition from Corinth, Miss., against Forrest 18 December 1862 – 3 January 1863. Action near Jackson 19 December 1862. Near Ripley, Miss., 23 December. Near. Middleburg 24–25 December. Bolivar 24 December. Near Clifton, Tenn., 1 January 1863. Scout between Bolivar, Tenn., and Ripley, Miss., 25–28 January. Pocahontas 24 March. Expedition to Hatchie River and skirmishes 1–16 April. Scout from LaGrange into northern Mississippi 29 April-5 May. Linden 12 May (detachment). Expedition from Jackson across Tennessee River 2–7 June. Operations in northwest Mississippi 15–25 June. Skirmishes at Forked Deer Creek and Jackson 13 July, and at Forked Deer Creek 15 July. Holly Springs 7 September. Expedition from LaGrange to Toone Station 11–16 September. Montezuma 16 September. Locke's Mills, near Moscow, 26 September. Operations in northern Mississippi and western Tennessee against Chalmers 4–17 October. Lockhart's Mills, Coldwater River, 6 October. Salem 8 October. Ingraham's Mills, near Byhalia, 12 October. Wyatt's 13 October. Operations on Memphis & Charleston Railroad 3–5 November. Holly Springs, Miss., 5 November. Operations on Memphis & Charleston Railroad against Lee's attack 28 November-10 December. Operations in northern Mississippi and western Tennessee 18–31 December. Ordered to Memphis, Tenn., 17 January 1864, and duty there until November. Scout in Hardin County 9 February. Seviersville and Miflin 18 February. Operations against Forrest in western Tennessee 16 March-14 April. Bolivar 29 March. Sturgis' Expedition to Ripley 30 April-9 May. Tracy City 4 August. Florence, Ala., 6–7 October. Ordered to Nashville, Tenn., 24 November. Battle of Nashville, Tenn., 15–16 December. Pursuit of Hood to the Tennessee River 17–28 December. Hollow Tree Gap and Franklin 17 December. Rutherford Creek 19 December. Lynnville 23 December. Pulaski 25–20 December. Hillsboro 29 December. Near Leighton 30 December. Narrows 2 January 1865. Thorn Hill 3 January. At Gravelly Springs, Ala., until February. At Edgefield and Pulaski and in District of Middle Tennessee until August, 1865.

== Commanders ==
- Colonel Fielding Hurst
- Lt. Colonel William K.M. Breckenridge
- Colonel William Jay Smith

== Casualties ==
The regiment lost a total of 396 men during service; 2 officers and 33 enlisted men killed or mortally wounded, 9 officers and 352 enlisted men died of disease.

== See also ==
- List of Tennessee Civil War units
- Tennessee in the Civil War
