= Shady Grove, Crockett County, Tennessee =

Shady Grove, Tennessee
- Unincorporated community
- Location within Tennessee Location within the United States
- Coordinates: 35°49′03″N 89°12′02″W
- Country: United States
- State: Tennessee
- County: Crockett
- Elevation: 351 ft (107 m)
- Time zone: UTC-6 (Central (CST))
  - Summer (DST): UTC-5 (CDT)
- Area code: 731
- GNIS feature ID: 1310840

Shady Grove is an unincorporated community in Crockett County, Tennessee, United States. Shady Grove is 1.4 miles (2.3 km) east of Maury City.
