= Midway, Crockett County, Tennessee =

Midway
- Unincorporated community
- Location within Tennessee Location within the United States
- Coordinates: 35°42′52″N 88°59′55″W
- Country: United States
- State: Tennessee
- County: Crockett
- Elevation: 390 ft (120 m)
- Time zone: UTC-6 (Central (CST))
  - Summer (DST): UTC-5 (CDT)
- Area code: 731
- GNIS feature ID: 1315505

Midway is an unincorporated community in Crockett County, Tennessee. Midway is 5 miles (8.0 km) east of Bells.
