= Andrew Ewing (politician) =

American politician (1813–1864)

Member of the U.S. House of Representatives from Tennessee's 8th district
- In office March 4, 1849 – March 3, 1851
- Preceded by: Washington Barrow
- Succeeded by: William Cullom

Personal details
- Born: June 17, 1813 Nashville, Tennessee, U.S.
- Died: June 16, 1864 (aged 50) Atlanta, Georgia, U.S.
- Party: Democratic
- Spouse: Rowena J Ewing
- Children: Rebecca P Ewing
- Education: University of Nashville
- Profession: lawyer; judge; politician

Andrew Ewing (June 17, 1813 – June 16, 1864) was an American politician and a member of the United States House of Representatives for the 8th congressional district of Tennessee.

== Biography ==
Ewing was born in Nashville on June 17, 1813. After completing preparatory studies, he graduated from the University of Nashville in 1832. He studied law, was admitted to the bar in 1835, and commenced practice in Nashville, Tennessee. He was the chosen trustee of the University of Nashville in 1833, and served in that office until his death.

== Career ==
Elected as a Democrat to the Thirty-first Congress, Ewing served from March 4, 1849, to March 3, 1851. He declined to be a candidate for renomination in 1850. He resumed the practice of law in Nashville, and he was a delegate to the 1860 Democratic National Convention at Baltimore. During the Civil War, he served as judge of General Braxton Bragg's military court.

== Death ==
Ewing died in Atlanta, Georgia, on June 16, 1864 (age 50 years, 365 days). He is interred at Nashville City Cemetery in Nashville, Tennessee. He was the brother of fellow congressman Edwin Hickman Ewing.

U.S. House of Representatives
Preceded by Washington Barrow	Member of the U.S. House of Representatives from Tennessee's 8th congressional district 1849-1851	Succeeded by William Cullom
