= David A. Nunn =

American politician (1833–1918)

David Alexander Nunn
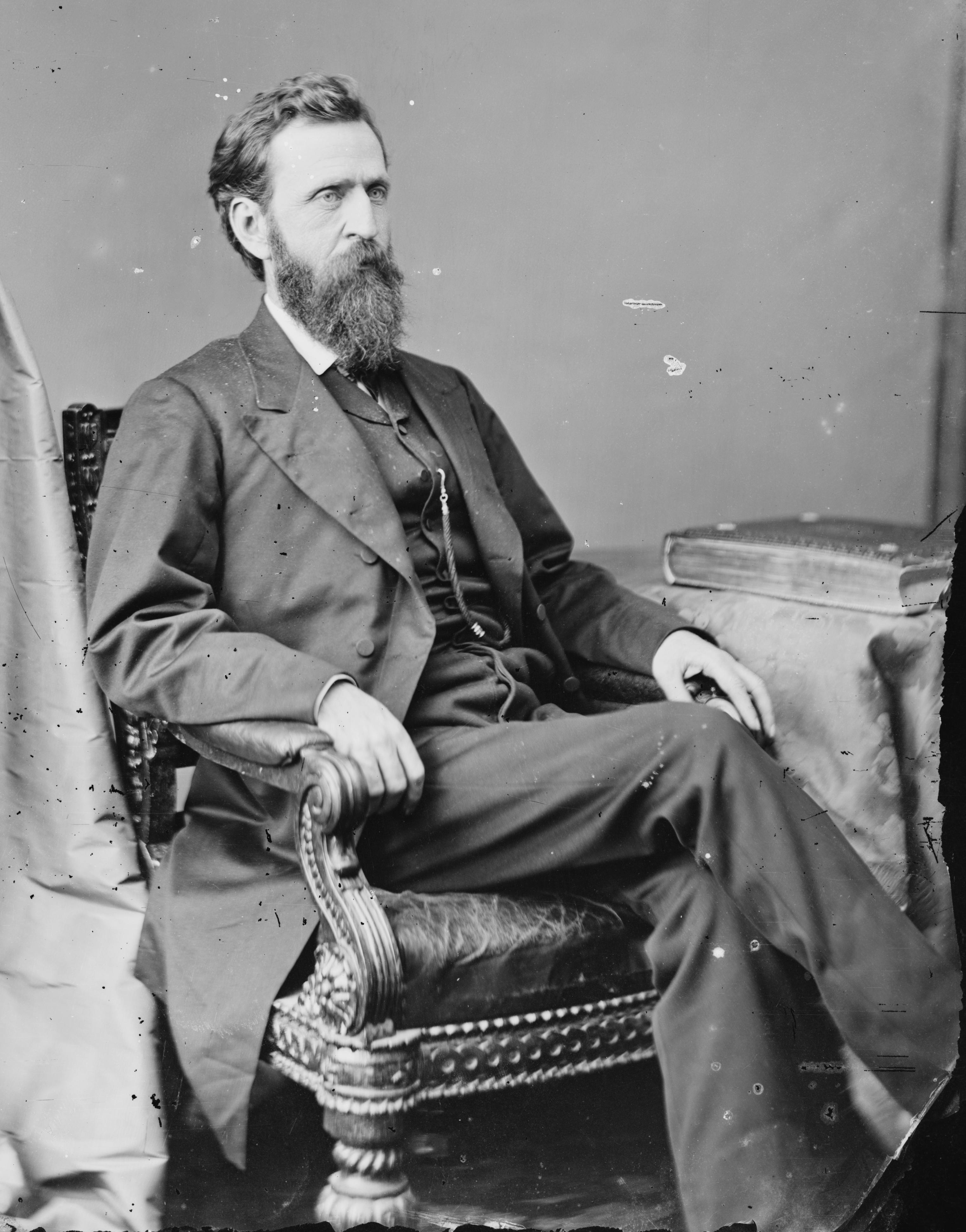

Member of the U.S. House of Representatives from Tennessee's 8th district
- In office March 4, 1867 – March 3, 1869
- Preceded by: John W. Leftwich
- Succeeded by: William J. Smith
- In office March 4, 1873 – March 3, 1875
- Preceded by: William W. Vaughan
- Succeeded by: John Atkins

Personal details
- Born: July 26, 1833 Haywood County, Tennessee, U.S.
- Died: September 11, 1918 (aged 85) Brownsville, Tennessee, U.S.
- Party: Republican
- Spouses: Mary E. Thompson Nunn; Tennessee Whitehead Nunn
- Children: Willie T. Nunn; David S. Nunn; Alice Isabella Nunn; Charlie Nunn; Cordie L. Nunn Poston
- Education: Cumberland University
- Profession: lawyer; politician

David Alexander Nunn (July 26, 1833 – September 11, 1918) was an American politician and a member of the United States House of Representatives from Tennessee's 8th congressional district.

== Biography ==
Nunn was born near Brownsville, Tennessee, in Haywood County, son of David and Alice Koonce Nunn. He attended private schools and West Tennessee College (now Union University at Jackson, Tennessee. He studied law and graduated from Cumberland University at Lebanon, Tennessee, in 1853. He was admitted to the bar, and he commenced practice in Brownsville. He married Mary E Thompson in that same year. They had five children, Willie T., David S., Alice Isabella, Charlie, and Cordie L. After Mary's death in 1873, he married Tennessee Whitehead in 1875.

== Career ==
Nunn was a presidential elector on the Constitutional Union ticket in 1860 and, then he was presidential elector on the Republican Ticket in 1864. He served in the Tennessee House of Representatives representing Haywood County from 1865 to 1867.

Elected as a Republican to the Fortieth Congress, Nunn was an unsuccessful Independent Republican candidate for re-election in 1868 to the Forty-first Congress. He served from March 4, 1867 to March 4, 1869.

Appointed Minister Resident to Ecuador on April 21, 1869, by President Grant, Nunn resigned on November 2, 1869. He was again elected to represent Tennessee in the Forty-third Congress, and served from March 4, 1873 to March 3, 1875. He was an unsuccessful candidate for re-election to the Forty-fourth Congress in 1874.

Nunn was the secretary of state of Tennessee from 1881 to 1885. When he was appointed by President McKinley as collector of internal revenue at Nashville, Tennessee on July 20, 1897, he served until his resignation on November 7, 1902. At that point he returned to private life.

== Death ==
Nunn died in Brownsville on September 11, 1918 (age 85 years, 47 days). He is interred at Oakwood Cemetery, Brownsville, Tennessee.

U.S. House of Representatives
Preceded by John W. Leftwich	Member of the U.S. House of Representatives from Tennessee's 8th congressional district 1867-1869	Succeeded by William J. Smith
Preceded by William W. Vaughan	Member of the U.S. House of Representatives from Tennessee's 8th congressional district 1873-1875	Succeeded by John D. C. Atkins
