= William Jay Smith (Tennessee politician) =

American politician (1823–1913)

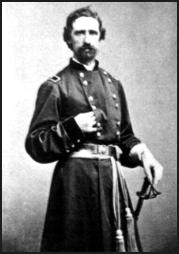

Member of the U.S. House of Representatives from Tennessee's 8th district
- In office March 4, 1869 – March 3, 1871
- Preceded by: David A. Nunn
- Succeeded by: William W. Vaughan

Personal details
- Born: September 24, 1823 Birmingham, England
- Died: November 29, 1913 (aged 90) Memphis, Tennessee, U.S.
- Party: Republican
- Spouse: Mary Ann Ross Smith (divorced in or around 1885)
- Profession: Printer, surveyor, soldier, realtor, banker

Military service
- Branch/service: United States Army; Union Army
- Rank: Colonel; Brevet Brigadier General
- Commands: 6th Tennessee Cavalry Regiment
- Battles/wars: Mexican–American War; American Civil War

William Jay Smith (September 24, 1823 – November 29, 1913) was an American politician and a member of the United States House of Representatives for Tennessee's 8th congressional district.

== Biography ==
Smith was born in Birmingham, England on September 24, 1823, and immigrated to the United States and settled in Orange County, New York. He attended the common schools, and after he had learned the printing trade, he moved to Tennessee in 1846.

== Career ==
During the Mexican–American War, in 1847, Smith served in a regiment from Tennessee. He moved to Hardeman County, Tennessee, and engaged in horticulture.

In the American Civil War, Smith served in the First West Tennessee U.S. Cavalry, later known as the 6th Tennessee Cavalry Regiment. He rose through the ranks of the regiment, largely as an associate and confederate of Fielding Hurst. Both Smith and Hurst gained reputations for using the regiment to enrich themselves during the course of the war. The regiment's most effective leader, Lt. Colonel William K.M. Breckenridge, who worked to equip and lead the regiment in most of its legitimate missions from October 1862 to October 1863, derisively referred to Smith as "Petticoat Smith" for his habit of raiding plantation homes and even taking ladies' garments for his own wife and daughters.

Smith, along with Hurst, detailed subordinates to burn and raid the homes and farms of local Confederate sympathizers. Despite labeling himself a Unionist and being a Union Army officer, Smith gained a reputation for seizing everything from furniture to mules and slaves and sending them back to his own plantation to enrich himself. His misdeeds remained largely unknown until the discovery of Breckenridge's diary in 2012 and the subsequent publication of In The Shadow of the Devil: William K.M. Breckenridge in Fielding Hurst's First West Tennessee U.S. Cavalry in 2020. This work helps to document Smith's controversial career, both wartime and postwar.

After the war, Smith knew both success and continued controversy. He was a delegate to the State constitutional convention in 1865. He was a member of the State house of representatives from 1865 to 1867. He also served in the State senate from 1867 to 1869, and again from 1885 to 1887. He was a surveyor of the port of Memphis, Tennessee from 1871 to 1883.

Elected as a Republican to the Forty-first Congress, Smith served from March 4, 1869 to March 3, 1871. An unsuccessful candidate for reelection, he engaged in the real estate and banking businesses. He was a delegate to the Republican National Convention in 1876.

== Death ==
Smith died in Memphis, on November 29, 1913 (age 90 years, 66 days), while walking down the street, due to sudden heart failure. He is interred at Elmwood Cemetery, in Memphis.

U.S. House of Representatives
Preceded by David A. Nunn	Member of the U.S. House of Representatives from Tennessee's 8th congressional district 1869-1871	Succeeded by William W. Vaughan
