= John W. Leftwich =

American politician (1826–1870)

John Leftwich
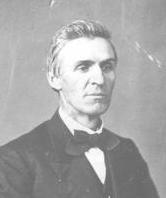

Member of the U.S. House of Representatives from Tennessee's 8th district
- In office July 24, 1866 – March 3, 1867
- Preceded by: James M. Quarles
- Succeeded by: David A. Nunn

Mayor of Memphis, Tennessee
- In office 1868–1869
- Preceded by: Edgar M. McDavitt
- Succeeded by: John T. Swayne
- In office 1869–1870
- Preceded by: John T. Swayne
- Succeeded by: John Johnson

Personal details
- Born: John William Leftwich; September 7, 1826 Liberty, Virginia, US
- Died: March 6, 1870 (aged 43) Lynchburg, Virginia, US
- Party: Unconditional Unionist
- Occupation: Politician

John William Leftwich (September 7, 1826 – March 6, 1870) was an American politician. An Unconditional Unionist, he was a member of the United States House of Representatives from Tennessee.

== Biography ==
Leftwich was born on September 7, 1826, in Liberty, Virginia, the son of Joel Leftwich and Mary L. (née Thorpe) Leftwich. Though, The Tennessean states be was instead born in "Brookbridge, Virginia". Of English descent, he was a distant member of the Breckinridge family. Educated at public schools, he graduated from Jefferson Medical College in 1850. He later moved to Memphis, Tennessee, where he worked as a cotton merchant.

Leftwich was a member of the Unconditional Union Party. After Tennessee rejoined the Union, he was elected to the House of Representatives. He served from July 24, 1866, to March 3, 1867, representing Tennessee's 8th district. He lost the following election. He was a delegate to the 1868 Democratic National Convention. Ideologically, he was liberal, though spoke at conservative conventions.

Leftwich was Mayor of Memphis from 1868 to 1869, and again from 1869 to 1870. He won the 1870 House election in Tennessee, but was refused a certificate of election by Governor Parson Brownlow. He began travelling to Washington, D.C. to circumvent Brownlow's refusal, but died before reaching the city.

On December 17, 1854, Leftwich married Gertrude Aurelia Wendle. He died on March 6, 1870, aged 43, in Lynchburg, Virginia, from illness, and was buried at Elmwood Cemetery, in Memphis.

U.S. House of Representatives
Preceded by Civil War	Member of the U.S. House of Representatives from Tennessee's 8th congressional district 1866-1867	Succeeded by David A. Nunn
