= Edwin Hickman Ewing =

American politician

Member of the U.S. House of Representatives from Tennessee's 8th district
- In office January 2, 1846 – March 3, 1847
- Preceded by: Joseph H. Peyton
- Succeeded by: Washington Barrow

Member of the Tennessee House of Representatives
- In office 1841–1842

Personal details
- Born: December 2, 1809 Nashville, Tennessee, US
- Died: April 24, 1902 (aged 92) Murfreesboro, Tennessee, US
- Party: Whig
- Spouse: Rebecca Williams Ewing
- Relations: Andrew Ewing (brother)
- Children: Josiah W. Ewing; Orville Ewing
- Education: University of Nashville
- Profession: lawyer; politician

Edwin Hickman Ewing (December 2, 1809 – April 24, 1902) was an American politician and a member of the United States House of Representatives for Tennessee's 8th congressional district.

== Biography ==
Ewing was born in Nashville, and after completing preparatory studies, he graduated from the University of Nashville in 1827, studied law, and was admitted to the bar in 1831. He began practicing law in Nashville and became a trustee of the University of Nashville in 1831, serving until his death. In 1841 and 1842, Hickman was a member of the Tennessee House of Representatives. He married Rebecca Williams in 1832 in Nashville, Tennessee.

== Career ==
Elected as a Whig to the Twenty-ninth Congress, Ewing served from January 2, 1846 to March 3, 1847, and was not a candidate for renomination, and resumed practicing law with his brother Andrew Ewing, until 1851. His health was failing and he took a trip abroad beginning on April 2, 1851, and was absent eighteen months.

In 1857 he bought a plantation in Rutherford County, and moved there, but returned to Nashville in 1859 with his son-in-law and daughter, Mr. and Mrs. Emmet Eakin, and lived with them for a year, when they removed to Saline County, Missouri, near Marshall. In 1860 he again removed to Murfreesboro, Tennessee to live with his son, Josiah W. Ewing, intending to practice law no more. After the Civil War, he was appointed president of the University of Nashville.

== Death ==
Ewing died in Murfreesboro, Tennessee on April 24, 1902, and is interred at Murfreesboro City Cemetery. He was the brother of fellow congressman Andrew Ewing.

U.S. House of Representatives
Preceded by Joseph H. Peyton	Member of the U.S. House of Representatives from Tennessee's 8th congressional district 1846-1847	Succeeded by Washington Barrow
