= Financial Competitive Act of 2013 =

- Long title: To require the Financial Stability Oversight Council to conduct a study of the likely effects of the differences between the United States and other jurisdictions in implementing the derivatives credit valuation adjustment capital requirement.
- Announced in: the 113th United States Congress
- Sponsored by: Rep. Stephen Lee Fincher (R, TN-8)
- Number of co-sponsors: 0

Codification
- Agencies affected: United States Congress

[H.R. 1341 Legislative history]
- Introduced in the House as H.R. 1341 by Rep. Stephen Fincher (R-TN) on March 21, 2013; Committee consideration by United States House Committee on Financial Services, United States House Financial Services Subcommittee on Capital Markets and Government-Sponsored Enterprises, United States House Committee on Agriculture, United States House Agriculture Subcommittee on General Farm Commodities and Risk Management, United States Senate Committee on Banking, Housing, and Urban Affairs; Passed the House on July 8, 2013 (Roll Call Vote 305: 353-24)

The Financial Competitive Act of 2013 (H.R. 1341) is a bill that was introduced into the United States House of Representatives during the 113th United States Congress. The bill would require the Financial Stability Oversight Council to conduct a study of "the likely effects that differences between the way the United States and foreign regulators implement the CVA [Credit Valuation Adjustment] would have on financial institutions, users of derivatives, and derivatives markets." The report would be due to Congress within 90 days after the enactment of the act (if it should become law). This study is in response to changes made by the Third Basel Accord, an international agreement among banks and financial regulators. The bill passed the House on July 8, 2013.

== Provisions/Elements of the bill ==
This summary is based largely on the summary provided by the Congressional Research Service, a public domain source.

The Financial Competitive Act of 2013 would direct the Financial Stability Oversight Council to study and report to Congress on the likely effects that differences between the United States and other jurisdictions in implementing the derivatives credit valuation adjustment capital requirement would have on: (1) U.S. financial institutions that conduct derivatives transactions and participate in derivatives markets, (2) end users of derivatives, and (3) international derivatives markets.

The bill would require the study to recommend steps Congress and the constituent agencies of the Council should take to: (1) minimize any expected negative effects on U.S. financial institutions, derivatives markets, and end users; and (2) encourage greater international consistency in implementation of internationally agreed capital, liquidity, and other prudential standards.

== Congressional Budget office report ==
The Third Basel Accord, the latest in a series of international agreements among central banks and financial regulators to standardize capital requirements for banks, directs financial institutions to, among other things, set aside additional capital reserves to account for the risk that counterparties participating in certain derivative agreements could default on the transaction. This additional capital requirement is known as the credit-value adjustment (CVA). H.R. 1341 would direct the Financial Stability Oversight Council (FSOC) to complete a study of the likely effects that differences between the way the United States and foreign regulators implement the CVA would have on financial institutions, users of derivatives, and derivatives markets. The study would include, among other things, an examination of the effect those differences would have on the pricing and cost of derivatives as well as the competitiveness of United States derivatives markets. H.R. 1341 would direct the FSOC to prepare a report of its findings for the Congress within 90 days of the date of enactment of the bill.

Based on information from the FSOC, the Congressional Budget Office (CBO) estimates that the bill would increase direct spending by about $1 million over the 2014-2023 period for additional staff to conduct the study and prepare the report. Under current law, the FSOC is authorized to levy an assessment on certain financial institutions to offset its operating costs. Those assessments are recorded in the budget as revenues; CBO expects that the FSOC would exercise that authority, and therefore, we estimate that enacting the bill would increase revenues by about $1 million as well.

In addition, CBO expects that the FSOC could use the expertise of staff from the regulatory agencies that make up the Council (the Federal Reserve System or the U.S. Securities and Exchange Commission, for example) to complete the study. CBO estimates that any additional costs incurred by those agencies would not be significant. On net, CBO estimates that enacting the bill would not have a significant effect on the deficit over the 10-year period. Because enacting H.R. 1341 would increase both direct spending and revenues, pay-as-you-go procedures apply.

H.R. 1341 contains no intergovernmental mandates as defined in the Unfunded Mandates Reform Act (UMRA) and would not affect the budgets of state, local, or tribal governments. Assuming that the Financial Stability Oversight Council increases fees to offset the costs of conducting the study required by the bill, H.R. 1341 would impose a private-sector mandate by increasing the cost of an existing mandate on financial institutions required to pay those fees. Based on information from the FSOC, CBO estimates that the cost of the mandate would total about $1 million over the next 10 years, and thus fall well below the annual threshold for private-sector mandates established in UMRA ($150 million in 2013, adjusted annually for inflation).

== Procedural history ==
=== House ===
The Financial Competitive Act of 2013 was introduced on March 21, 2013 by Rep. Stephen Fincher (R-TN). The bill was referred to both the United States House Committee on Financial Services and the United States House Committee on Agriculture. The United States House Financial Services Subcommittee on Capital Markets and Government-Sponsored Enterprises held hearings on the bill on April 11, 2013. The House Financial Services Committee marked up the bill on May 7, 2013 and voted to discharge it 59-0. It was submitted alongside House Report 113-134 pt 1. The bill was referred to the United States House Agriculture Subcommittee on General Farm Commodities and Risk Management and then released from the House Agriculture Committee on June 28, 2013. On July 8, 2013, the House voted 353-24 in Roll Call Vote 305 to pass the bill.

=== Senate ===
The Financial Competitive Act of 2013 was received in the United States Senate on July 9, 2013 and referred to the United States Senate Committee on Banking, Housing, and Urban Affairs.

== Debate and discussion ==
Rep. Fincher argued that the bill was necessary in order to keep American financial institutes competitive and protect American jobs. His statement indicated that the Europeans had exempted themselves from the new CVA rules, thus prompting his bill to study how this would affect the United States.

== See also ==
- List of bills in the 113th United States Congress
- Financial Stability Oversight Council
- Derivative (finance)
- Third Basel Accord
- Bank regulation
- Capital market
- Capital requirement
