= Stephen Fincher =

American politician (born 1973)

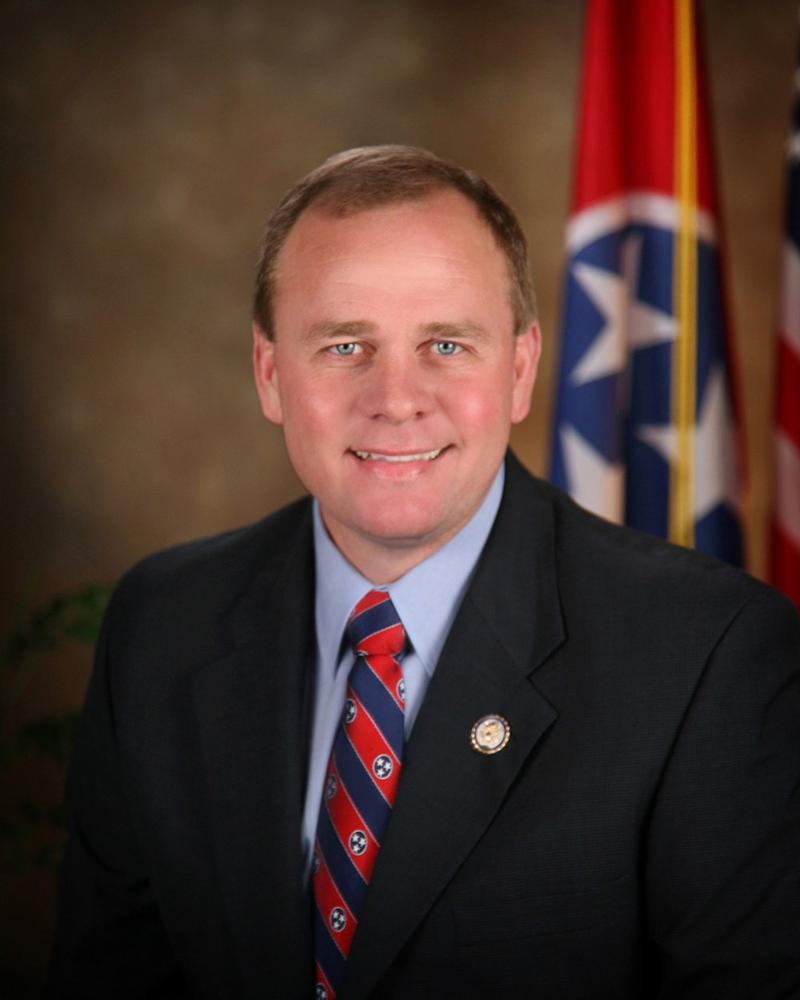

Member of the U.S. House of Representatives from Tennessee's 8th district
- In office January 3, 2011 – January 3, 2017
- Preceded by: John Tanner
- Succeeded by: David Kustoff

Personal details
- Born: Stephen Lee Fincher; February 7, 1973 (age 53) Memphis, Tennessee, U.S.
- Party: Republican
- Spouse: Lynn Fincher
- Children: 3

Stephen Lee Fincher (born February 7, 1973) is an American politician who was the U.S. representative for Tennessee's 8th congressional district from 2011 to 2017. He is a member of the Republican Party. The seat was vacated by retiring Democratic incumbent John Tanner in 2010, and Fincher defeated Democratic Tennessee state senator Roy Herron in the 2010 mid-term Congressional election. Fincher was reelected in 2012 and 2014. On February 1, 2016, he announced that he would not be running for a fourth term.

On October 22, 2017, Fincher announced his candidacy for the U.S Senate seat held by outgoing Senator Bob Corker. Fincher withdrew his candidacy in February 2018, instead urging Corker to seek reelection.

== Early life, education, and farming career ==
Fincher was born in 1973 in Memphis. When he was 9 years old, he joined the Fincher Family singing ministry, a gospel group led by his grandmother that travels to county fairs throughout the 8th district. They perform at more than 100 events each year. Fincher graduated from Crockett County High School in Alamo.

A seventh generation farmer, Fincher is a managing partner in Fincher Farms, a family business that grows cotton, corn, soybeans, and wheat on more than 2,500 acres in western Tennessee. The company has received $8.9 million in farm subsidies over the past decade, mostly from the cotton program, according to U.S. Department of Agriculture data. Fincher received a $13,650 grant to help buy grain hauling and storage equipment from the state Department of Agriculture in 2009 as part of the Tennessee Agricultural Enhancement Program. Fincher has received over $3.5 million from federal subsidies over the years, mostly for cotton farming.

Fincher and his wife Lynn live in Frog Jump, an unincorporated community west of Jackson.

== U.S. House of Representatives ==
=== Elections ===
==== 2010 ====
Fincher announced his candidacy for the 8th District before 11-term Democratic incumbent John S. Tanner announced his retirement. He won the August primary largely as a result of high voter turnout in rural areas of the district.

In the general election, Fincher faced Democratic State Senator Roy Herron, Tea Party candidate Donn Janes, who earlier dropped out of the Republican primary, and Independent Mark J. Rawles. Fincher declined to participate in a series of public debates. Fincher was criticized by Herron and local media for his decision not to disclose his income tax returns, calling the criticism a "witch hunt." Fincher stated: "There is no reason for me to disclose my tax returns. These attacks are because Herron is losing and he can't handle it. He is avoiding the issues."

He received endorsements from former Governor Winfield Dunn, Citizens United, Eagle Forum, Family Research Council, Concerned Women for America, and State Senator Dolores Gresham. Fincher had over $420,000 cash on hand. Herron had over $1.1 million cash on hand.

The 8th had long been a classic "Yellow Dog" Democrat district. Most state and local officials were Democrats, and congressional elections usually saw Democrats skate to reelection. However, it had become increasingly friendly to Republicans at the national level since the turn of the 21st century. In the 2008 presidential election, Republican U.S. Senator John McCain carried the district with 56% of the vote.

On November 2, 2010, Fincher defeated Herron, receiving 98,484 votes to Herron's 64,701, or approximately 60% of the vote. Upon his swearing-in on January 3, 2011, Fincher became the first Republican to represent what is now the 8th District since 1898.

==== 2012 ====
Fincher's seat was made considerably safer after the 2010 census. He lost his share of Clarksville while picking up some heavily Republican territory east of Memphis which had previously been in the 7th District. This turned the 8th into one of the most Republican districts in the nation; with a Cook Partisan Voting Index of R+19, it is the 11th most Republican district in the South and the most Republican district in the state outside of East Tennessee.

On paper, this left Fincher vulnerable to a primary challenge from a Memphis-area Republican. However, his lone opponent in the Republican primary was Annette Justice, a youth worker from Dyersburg. Fincher defeated her with 86% of the vote, and then defeated Democrat Timothy Dixon in the general election with 68% of the vote.

==== 2014 ====
On November 4, 2014, Fincher was elected to a third term by his widest margin, securing approximately 73% of the vote.

=== Tenure ===
Fincher is a fiscal and social conservative; he is strongly pro-life and pro-gun, and opposes same-sex marriage. On the issues section of his Website, he lists his top priority as restoring "limited government." He does not consider himself a traditional politician; his slogan in 2010 was "My roots are in Tennessee, not in politics."

In September 2011, Fincher was named one of the "Most Corrupt Members of Congress" for 2011 by Citizens for Responsibility and Ethics in Washington, specifically citing the Gates Banking loan.

In 2012, Fincher received the largest election contribution from the NRA; more than any other US Senator or Representative.

==== Food stamps ====
In May 2013, Fincher argued for large cuts to the Supplemental Nutrition Assistance Program (SNAP), formerly known as the Food Stamp program along with his House Republican colleagues. Fincher, who owns a farm, has received over $3.5 million in agricultural subsidies from the federal government. Critics accused Fincher of hypocrisy. Fincher voted to cut farm subsidies (also known as direct payments) in this year's Farm Bill, the first Farm Bill he has voted on while in Congress.

==== Bills sponsored ====
The following is an incomplete list of bills sponsored by Fincher during his tenure as a Congressperson.

- Financial Competitive Act of 2013 (H.R. 1341; 113th Congress) (H.R. 1341) – The bill would require the Financial Stability Oversight Council to conduct a study of "the likely effects that differences between the way the United States and foreign regulators implement the CVA would have on financial institutions, users of derivatives, and derivatives markets." The report would be due to Congress within 90 days after the enactment of the act (if it should become law). This study is in response to changes made by the Third Basel Accord, an international agreement among banks and financial regulators.
- IRS Abuse Protect Act of 2013 (H.R. 3074; 113th Congress) (H.R. 3074) – This bill would require that the secretary of the U.S. Treasury notify taxpayers, in writing, each time the IRS accesses their tax accounts, tax returns or other tax return information. The notice must include who accessed the information, the purpose of doing so and how the information was accessed. Taxpayers would also receive a copy of the information accessed, and any report issued on how it was used.

==== FEC investigation ====
In October 2010, the Federal Election Commission announced that it was conducting an investigation into a $250,000 loan the Gates Banking and Trust Company, where Fincher's father is a board member, made to Fincher that he did not disclose on his FEC filings. Initially, Fincher's FEC filing indicated that the loan to the campaign committee came from the candidate’s personal funds with no reference to a bank loan. On December 6, 2010, the campaign amended the filing.

=== Committee assignments ===
- Committee on Financial Services
  - Subcommittee on Financial Institutions and Consumer Credit
  - Subcommittee on Oversight and Investigations
- Committee on Agriculture
- Republican Study Committee
- Mississippi River Caucus Co-Chair

== Post-congressional career ==
Fincher is a member of the ReFormers Caucus of Issue One.

U.S. House of Representatives
Preceded by John Tanner	Member of the U.S. House of Representatives from Tennessee's 8th congressional district 2011–2017	Succeeded by David Kustoff
U.S. order of precedence (ceremonial)
Preceded by Ken Lucas as Former U.S. Representative	Order of precedence of the United States as Former U.S. Representative	Succeeded by Mark Green as Former U.S. Representative
