= Louise Pearson Memorial Arboretum =

Arboretum in Crockett County, Tennessee, United States

- Type: Arboretum
- Location: Crockett County, Tennessee

The Louise Pearson Memorial Arboretum is an arboretum located in the Green Frog Historic Village, Crockett County, Tennessee. The arboretum was created by the Bells Garden Club in 2001 and included about 30 varieties of trees indigenous to the area. The club named the arboretum in honor of deceased garden club member Louise Pearson. According to the Bells Garden Club Arboretum Committee, the arboretum now contains almost 200 different tree species.

The arboretum was certified as a Level I arboretum in 2002 by the Tennessee Urban Forestry Council in cooperation with the Tennessee Federation of Garden Clubs. The Bells club used several matching grants to add trees, a number of trees were donated as memorials, and the arboretum received its Level II certification in 2006.

Arboreta are designated as Levels I through IV based on the number of different tree species they contain. A Level III arboretum must have a minimum of 90 different species, each correctly labelled with both common and scientific names. The Louise Pearson Arboretum now lists more than 100 different tree species and attained a Level III designation in November, 2011.

Bells Garden Club welcomes students to do their required leaf collections at the arboretum, conducted tours can be arranged by request, and self-guided tour guides are available in a mailbox on the arboretum grounds for anyone wishing to tour the arboretum independently.
