= Crockett County, Tennessee =

County in Tennessee, United States

- County
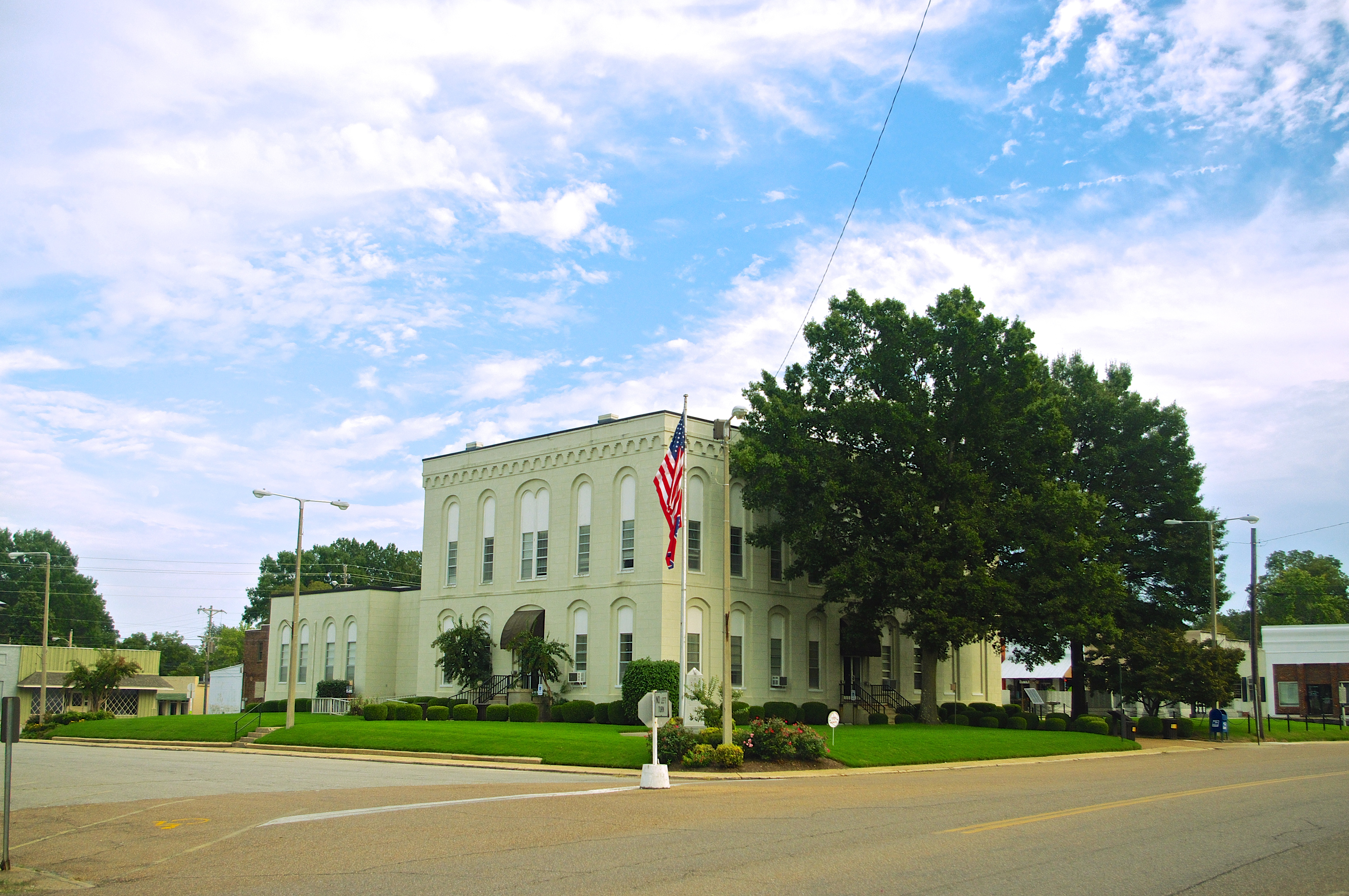
- Crockett County Courthouse in Alamo

- Location within the U.S. state of Tennessee
- Coordinates: 35°49′N 89°08′W
- Country: United States
- State: Tennessee
- Founded: 1871
- Named for: Davy Crockett
- Seat: Alamo
- Largest city: Bells

Area
  - Total: 266 sq mi (690 km^{2})
  - Land: 266 sq mi (690 km^{2})
  - Water: 0.2 sq mi (0.52 km^{2}) 0.08%

Population (2020)
  - Total: 13,911
  - Estimate (2025): 14,006 ▲
  - Density: 54/sq mi (21/km^{2})
- Time zone: UTC−6 (Central)
  - Summer (DST): UTC−5 (CDT)
- Congressional district: 8th
- Website: www.crockettcountytn.com

Crockett County is a county located in the U.S. state of Tennessee. As of the 2020 census, the population was 13,911. Its county seat is Alamo. Crockett County is included in the Jackson, Tennessee metropolitan area.

== History ==
Crockett County was formed in 1871 from portions of Haywood, Madison, Dyer and Gibson counties. It is named in honor of David Crockett, frontier humorist, soldier, Tennessee state legislator and U.S. congressman, and defender of the Alamo.

In 1876, in what apparently was a political rivalry gone bad, Crockett County Sheriff R. G. Harris and 19 other unidentified men removed four men from the county jail and beat them, killing one of them. The sheriff was arrested. In United States v. Harris (1883), the Supreme Court ruled that the Sheriff could not be prosecuted under federal law.

== Geography ==
According to the U.S. Census Bureau, the county has a total area of 266 square miles (690 km^{2}), of which 266 square miles (690 km^{2}) is land and 0.2 square miles (0.52 km^{2}) (0.08%) is water.

=== Adjacent counties ===
- Gibson County (northeast)
- Madison County (southeast)
- Haywood County (south)
- Lauderdale County (west)
- Dyer County (northwest)

=== State protected areas ===
- Horns Bluff Refuge (part)

== Demographics ==
Historical population
Census	Pop.	Note	%±
1880	14,109		—
1890	15,146		7.3%
1900	15,867		4.8%
1910	16,076		1.3%
1920	17,438		8.5%
1930	17,359		−0.5%
1940	17,330		−0.2%
1950	16,624		−4.1%
1960	14,594		−12.2%
1970	14,402		−1.3%
1980	14,941		3.7%
1990	13,378		−10.5%
2000	14,532		8.6%
2010	14,586		0.4%
2020	13,911		−4.6%
2025 (est.)	14,006	▲	0.7%
U.S. Decennial Census; 1790-1960 1900-1990; 1990-2000 2010-2014

=== Racial and ethnic composition ===
Crockett County, Tennessee – Racial and ethnic composition Note: the US Census treats Hispanic/Latino as an ethnic category. This table excludes Latinos from the racial categories and assigns them to a separate category. Hispanics/Latinos may be of any race.
Race / ethnicity (NH = Non-Hispanic)	Pop 1980	Pop 1990	Pop 2000	Pop 2010	Pop 2020	% 1980	% 1990	% 2000	% 2010	% 2020
White alone (NH)	12,027	11,064	11,549	11,253	10,056	80.50%	82.70%	79.47%	77.15%	72.29%
Black or African American alone (NH)	2,794	2,250	2,077	1,837	1,879	18.70%	16.82%	14.29%	12.59%	13.51%
Native American or Alaska Native alone (NH)	10	9	22	12	19	0.07%	0.07%	0.15%	0.08%	0.14%
Asian alone (NH)	8	4	8	25	25	0.05%	0.03%	0.06%	0.17%	0.18%
Native Hawaiian or Pacific Islander alone (NH)	x	x	0	4	1	x	x	0.00%	0.03%	0.01%
Other race alone (NH)	7	2	3	16	50	0.05%	0.01%	0.02%	0.11%	0.36%
Mixed race or Multiracial (NH)	x	x	80	165	383	x	x	0.55%	1.13%	2.75%
Hispanic or Latino (any race)	95	49	793	1,274	1,498	0.64%	0.37%	5.46%	8.73%	10.77%
Total	14,941	13,378	14,532	14,586	13,911	100.00%	100.00%	100.00%	100.00%	100.00%

=== 2020 census ===
As of the 2020 census, there were 13,911 people, 5,565 households, and 3,700 families residing in the county. The median age was 41.2 years; 23.5% of residents were under the age of 18 and 19.1% were 65 years of age or older. For every 100 females there were 91.7 males, and for every 100 females age 18 and over there were 88.9 males.

Of the households, 33.0% had children under the age of 18 living in them. Of all households, 47.0% were married-couple households, 17.6% were households with a male householder and no spouse or partner present, and 29.2% were households with a female householder and no spouse or partner present. About 27.1% of all households were made up of individuals and 13.1% had someone living alone who was 65 years of age or older.

There were 6,071 housing units, of which 8.3% were vacant. Among occupied housing units, 70.7% were owner-occupied and 29.3% were renter-occupied. The homeowner vacancy rate was 1.4% and the rental vacancy rate was 5.5%.

Fewer than 0.1% of residents lived in urban areas, while 100.0% lived in rural areas.

The racial makeup of the county was 72.29% White (non-Hispanic), 13.51% Black or African American (non-Hispanic), 0.14% Native American, 0.18% Asian, 0.01% Pacific Islander, 3.11% other or mixed, and 10.77% Hispanic or Latino of any race.

=== 2000 census ===
As of the census of 2000, there were 14,532 people, 5,632 households, and 4,066 families residing in the county. The population density was 55 people per square mile (21 people/km^{2}). There were 6,138 housing units at an average density of 23 units per square mile (8.9/km^{2}). The racial makeup of the county was 81.96% White, 14.37% Black or African American, 0.20% Native American, 0.06% Asian, 2.79% from other races, and 0.63% from two or more races. 5.46% of the population were Hispanic or Latino of any race.

There were 5,632 households, out of which 32.70% had children under the age of 18 living with them, 56.40% were married couples living together, 11.80% had a female householder with no husband present, and 27.80% were non-families. 25.30% of all households were made up of individuals, and 11.50% had someone living alone who was 65 years of age or older. The average household size was 2.53 and the average family size was 3.01.

In the county, the population was spread out, with 25.10% under the age of 18, 8.10% from 18 to 24, 28.30% from 25 to 44, 22.70% from 45 to 64, and 15.80% who were 65 years of age or older. The median age was 37 years. For every 100 females there were 93.30 males. For every 100 females age 18 and over, there were 90.70 males.

The median income for a household in the county was $30,015, and the median income for a family was $36,713. Males had a median income of $27,436 versus $21,073 for females. The per capita income for the county was $14,600. About 13.20% of families and 16.90% of the population were below the poverty line, including 19.50% of those under age 18 and 17.90% of those age 65 or over.

== Media ==
=== Radio ===
- WTJS Good News 93.1 - WTJS - Alamo - Contemporary Christian Music

=== Newspaper ===
The Crockett Times is the paper of record in Crockett County, Tennessee. Locally owned and operated, The Times publishes articles on Crockett County communities of Alamo, Bells, Crockett Mills, Friendship, Gadsden and Maury City, as well as surrounding areas. The Times also publicizes legal notices such as notice to creditors, foreclosure notices, adoption notices, and beer permits. The newspaper is published once a week on Thursday. The Times began publishing in 1873 as the Crockett County Sentinel. In 1933, The Sentinel merged with two other newspapers and was renamed the Crockett Times.

== Communities ==
=== Cities ===
- Bells
- Friendship

=== Towns ===
- Alamo (county seat)
- Gadsden
- Maury City

=== Unincorporated communities ===
- Cairo
- Shady Grove
- Crockett Mills
- Frog Jump
- Fruitvale
- Midway
- Shady Grove

== Points of interest ==
- Louise Pearson Memorial Arboretum

== Politics ==
United States presidential election results for Crockett County, Tennessee
Year	Republican		Democratic		Third party(ies)	
Year	No.	%	No.	%	No.	%
1912	852	31.73%	1,297	48.31%	536	19.96%
1916	1,144	41.57%	1,608	58.43%	0	0.00%
1920	2,326	50.81%	2,252	49.19%	0	0.00%
1924	587	33.07%	1,168	65.80%	20	1.13%
1928	710	48.66%	749	51.34%	0	0.00%
1932	513	20.79%	1,934	78.39%	20	0.81%
1936	525	21.43%	1,921	78.41%	4	0.16%
1940	733	26.27%	2,048	73.41%	9	0.32%
1944	782	35.35%	1,421	64.24%	9	0.41%
1948	601	22.77%	1,415	53.60%	624	23.64%
1952	1,343	38.27%	2,155	61.41%	11	0.31%
1956	1,026	33.02%	1,964	63.21%	117	3.77%
1960	1,467	48.69%	1,438	47.73%	108	3.58%
1964	1,873	50.76%	1,817	49.24%	0	0.00%
1968	932	20.71%	703	15.62%	2,865	63.67%
1972	2,642	75.40%	735	20.98%	127	3.62%
1976	1,694	36.07%	2,963	63.08%	40	0.85%
1980	2,117	46.14%	2,422	52.79%	49	1.07%
1984	2,479	55.97%	1,937	43.73%	13	0.29%
1988	2,214	55.77%	1,742	43.88%	14	0.35%
1992	2,180	40.69%	2,657	49.60%	520	9.71%
1996	1,872	43.11%	2,256	51.96%	214	4.93%
2000	2,676	49.19%	2,705	49.72%	59	1.08%
2004	3,242	56.66%	2,459	42.97%	21	0.37%
2008	3,994	66.16%	1,967	32.58%	76	1.26%
2012	3,783	68.81%	1,669	30.36%	46	0.84%
2016	3,982	73.78%	1,303	24.14%	112	2.08%
2020	4,673	76.43%	1,382	22.60%	59	0.96%
2024	4,674	78.94%	1,196	20.20%	51	0.86%

== See also ==
- National Register of Historic Places listings in Crockett County, Tennessee
