= William Cullom =

American politician (1810–1896)

Clerk of the United States House of Representatives
- In office 1856–1857
- Speaker: Nathaniel P. Banks
- Preceded by: John W. Forney
- Succeeded by: James C. Allen

Member of the U.S. House of Representatives from Tennessee
- In office March 4, 1851 – March 3, 1855
- Preceded by: Andrew Ewing (8th); John H. Savage (4th)
- Succeeded by: Felix Zollicoffer (8th); John H. Savage (4th)
- Constituency: 8th district (1851-53); 4th district (1853-55)

Member of the Tennessee Senate
- In office 1843–1847

Personal details
- Born: June 4, 1810 Wayne County, Kentucky, U.S.
- Died: December 6, 1896 (aged 86) Clinton, Tennessee, U.S.
- Party: Whig
- Spouse: Virginia Ingram Cullom Mary Griffith Cullom
- Children: Marietta Cullom; Virginia Cullom; Cornelius Perry Cullom; Ella Cullom; Leslie Cullom; Minnie Cullom; Florence Cullom; Clara Cullom; Albert Cullom; Sidney Johnston Cullom; William Cullom; Ella Cullom; Rosa May Cullom; Cora Henderson Cullom
- Profession: Lawyer, politician

William Cullom (June 4, 1810 – December 6, 1896) was an American politician and a member of the United States House of Representatives.

== Biography ==
Cullom was born on June 4, 1810, near Monticello, Kentucky, in Wayne County. He attended the public schools and studied law in Lexington, Kentucky. He was admitted to the bar, and he practiced in the courts of Kentucky and Tennessee. He moved to Carthage, Tennessee and served as a member of the Tennessee State Senate from 1843 to 1847.

== Career ==
Elected as a Whig to the Thirty-second Congress by Tennessee's 8th congressional district, and to the Thirty-third Congress by Tennessee's 4th congressional district, he served from March 4, 1851, to March 3, 1855. He was an unsuccessful candidate for renomination in 1854 to the Thirty-fourth Congress.

Cullom was appointed the Clerk of the United States House of Representatives in the Thirty-fourth Congress, and he served from February 4, 1856, to December 6, 1857. During the debate on secession, Cullom stumped Tennessee in favor of remaining in the Union but when Tennessee finally seceded, he grudgingly supported the decision but retired to his home at Carthage and did not take a prominent role supporting either side. Both sides viewed his actions with much distrust thinking he was supporting the other. After the war, he was divorced from his first wife, Virginia Ingram Cullom, and remarried to Mary Griffin.

Appointed Attorney General for the 16th Judicial Circuit in 1873, Cullom also served as a judge in Clinton for several years He resumed the practice of law and was the attorney general for the sixteenth district from 1873 to 1878.

== Death ==
Cullom died in Clinton, Tennessee on December 6, 1896 (age 86 years, 185 days). He was interred at McAdoo Cemetery in Clinton, Tennessee, and later reinterred at Mount Olivet Cemetery at Chattanooga, Tennessee.

== Notes ==
U.S. House of Representatives
Preceded by Andrew Ewing	Member of the U.S. House of Representatives from Tennessee's 8th congressional district 1851–1853	Succeeded by Felix Zollicoffer
Preceded by John H. Savage	Member of the U.S. House of Representatives from Tennessee's 4th congressional district 1853–1855	Succeeded by John H. Savage
Government offices
Preceded by John W. Forney	Clerk of the United States House of Representatives; 1856-1857	Succeeded by James C. Allen
