= Fielding Hurst =

American surveyor, planter and lawyer (1810–1882)

Fielding Jackson Hurst (1810–1882) was a surveyor, planter and lawyer who served as a colonel in the Union Army, commanding the 6th Regiment Tennessee Volunteer Cavalry during the American Civil War. He later served as a Unionist member of the Tennessee Senate and as a judge. As a Southern Unionist and slaveholder, he remains a controversial figure.

Hurst was born in Claiborne County, Tennessee, in 1810. Around 1834, he and his wife, Melocky, moved to McNairy County. He worked as a surveyor and owned a plantation with several families of slaves.

In 1861, Tennessee voted to secede from the United States and join the fledgling Confederate States of America as its last state. Hurst remained steadfastly Unionist and was imprisoned in Nashville along with many other prominent Unionist Tennesseans after the vote. After Tennessee was retaken by Union troops in 1862, Hurst was freed.

Hurst formed a unit of mounted scouts. They served as self-funded irregulars until Tennessee military governor Andrew Johnson commissioned Hurst as commander of the newly formed First West Tennessee Cavalry, later known as the 6th Tennessee Volunteer Cavalry. Hurst and his unit gained a reputation for harsh tactics, angering Confederates and even leading to his brief reimprisonment by Union officials.

However, recent scholarship has proven that Lt. Colonel William K.M. Breckenridge, the regiment's second-in-command, was largely responsible for the unit's formation and effective leadership through October 1863, when Breckenridge died of disease in Grand Junction, Tennessee. Unbeknownst until 2012, Breckenridge had maintained a diary that documented the regiment's history from formation through Breckenridge's death. That diary revealed new details pertaining to Hurst's unsavory wartime activities and his lack of actual leadership in the regiment's day-to-day activities. The diary became the basis of In The Shadow of the Devil: William K.M. Breckenridge in Fielding Hurst's First West Tennessee U.S. Cavalry.

Breckenridge's diary further provided evidence that the ill reputation gained by the regiment was largely due to the actions of Hurst and his fellow officer, William Jay Smith, as well as a handful of their direct subordinates. Otherwise, the regiment appears now to have been composed of otherwise dedicated Unionists.

The First West Tennessee U.S. Cavalry/6th Tennessee U.S. Cavalry clashed several times with the forces of Confederate general Nathan Bedford Forrest. Hurst resigned his commission in December 1864, citing poor health, but largely because of his humiliating defeat at the battle of Bolivar, Tennessee, which resulted largely from his acts of insubordination.

On March 4, 1865, he was elected as a Unionist to represent District 21 of the Tennessee Senate, which at that time consisted of Hardeman, Hardin and McNairy counties. His first vote was to ratify the Thirteenth Amendment. He resigned after the Senate session ended on June 12, 1865, to accept a position as circuit judge. The book, In the Shadow of the Devil, further details Hurst's colorful postwar career.

Hurst was a local leader of the Grand Army of the Republic. He died in poverty near Rose Creek in McNairy County, Tennessee, on April 3, 1882 and remained a hated figure among Confederate sympathizers. He was interred at Mount Gilead Cemetery in McNairy County.

== See also ==
- Guerrilla warfare in the American Civil War
- Tennessee in the American Civil War
