= Frog Jump, Crockett County, Tennessee =

Unincorporated community in Tennessee, US

Coordinates: 35°49′00″N 89°20′07″W

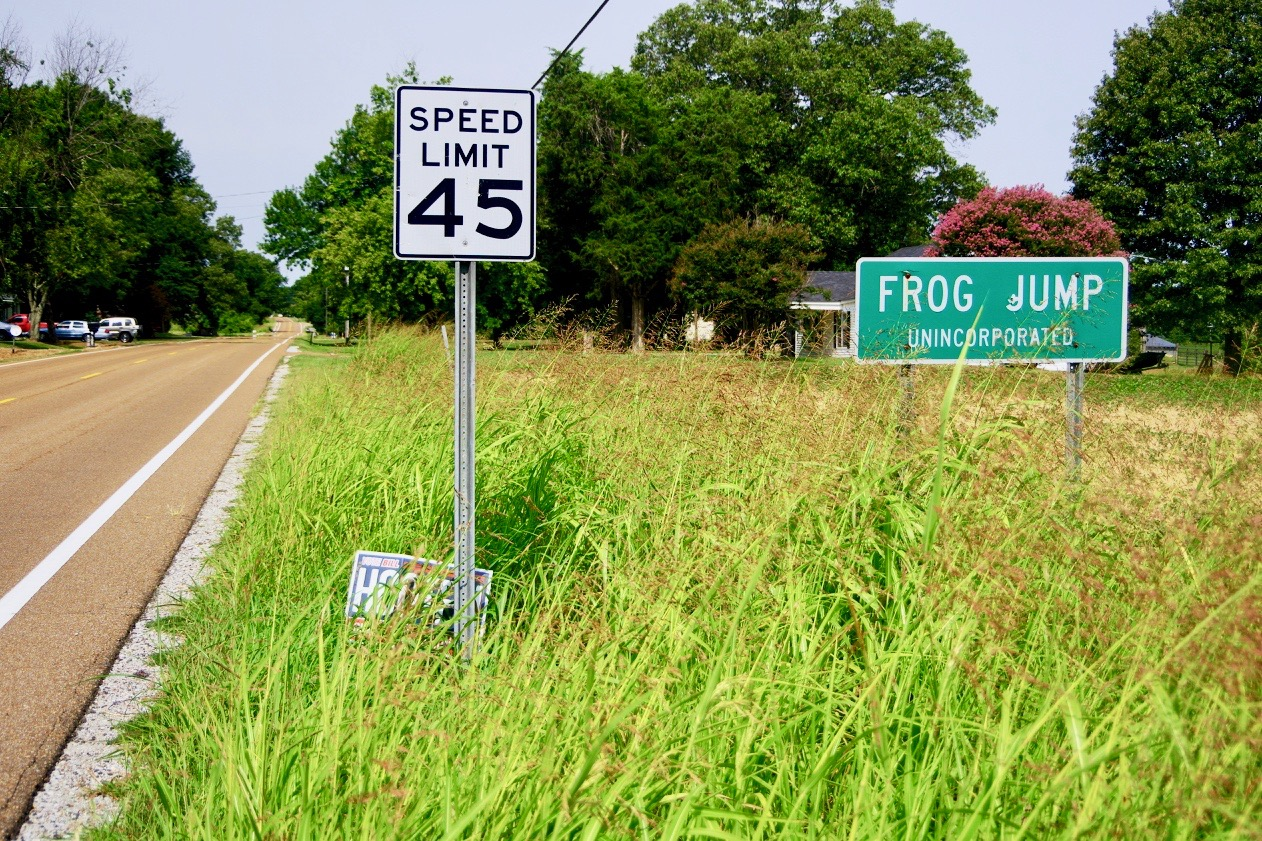
Entrance to Frog Jump along State Route 88

Frog Jump is an unincorporated community in Crockett County, Tennessee, United States. The community lies along a rural stretch of State Route 88 between Halls to the west and Maury City to the east. The community's name is believed to be a humorous reference to its small size, namely that it's small enough for a frog to jump over in a single hop.

== Civil Air Patrol ==
Frog Jump is home to SER-TN-300 (Frog Jump Composite Squadron), a Civil Air Patrol squadron that meets weekly on Wednesday nights 6:00 P.M. to 8:00 P.M. at Archer's Chapel Church, on Archer's Chapel Rd. As of July 31st, 2026 the unit consists of 32 cadet members, and 12 senior members, which bring the total to 44 members. The squadron has been active since 2007, and has been at its current meeting place since 2022.

== Notable inhabitants ==
- Stephen Fincher, a former U.S. congressman, lives in Frog Jump
