= State bank (United States) =

Type of banking charter in the United States

In the United States, a state bank is a bank in a U.S. state that is chartered by the government of that state, as opposed to a national bank which is chartered at the federal level.

== Overview ==
A state chartered bank cannot have "National" or "Federal" in its name.

State banks are chartered and regulated by a state agency (often called the Department of Financial Institutions) in the state in which its headquarters are located. In addition, state banks that are members of the Federal Reserve are regulated by the Federal Reserve; state banks that are not members of the Federal Reserve are regulated by the Federal Deposit Insurance Corporation (FDIC). Therefore, virtually every state chartered bank has both a state and federal regulator. There are a very small number of state banks that do not have FDIC insurance.

== List of U.S. banks with "State Bank" in their name ==
- Union State Bank, Alabama
- Old State Bank (Decatur, Alabama)
- Farmer's State Bank, Arkansas
- Farmers State Bank (Conway, Arkansas)
- Beneficial State Bank, California
- Ontario State Bank Block, California
- Farmers State Bank of Cope, Colorado
- SouthState Bank, Florida
- Old Bunnell State Bank Building, Florida
- Hillsboro State Bank Building, Florida
- Hernando State Bank, Florida
- Old Bunnell State Bank Building, Florida
- Carver State Bank, Georgia
- State Bank of Kamiah, Idaho
- State Bank of Kooskia, Idaho
- Illinois State Bank Building
- American State Bank (Berwyn, Illinois)
- State Bank of Chicago, Illinois
- Lake View State Bank Building, Illinois
- State Bank Building (Collinsville, Illinois)
- The Elgin State Bank, Illinois
- First State Bank of Manlius, Illinois:
- People's State Bank (Orangeville, Illinois)
- Berwyn State Bank Building, Illinois
- Haubstadt State Bank, Indiana
- State Bank of Hammond Building, Indiana
- Purdue State Bank, Indiana
- Old State Bank (Vincennes, Indiana)
- Guttenberg State Bank, Iowa
- National State Bank (Mount Pleasant, Iowa)
- State Bank of Stratford, Iowa
- Tipton State Bank, Iowa
- Farmers' State Bank (Volga, Iowa)
- Stockgrowers State Bank, Kansas
- Dorrance State Bank, Kansas
- First State Bank (Edna, Kansas)
- Security State Bank (Eskridge, Kansas)
- State Bank of Girard, Kansas
- Farmers State Bank (Lindsborg, Kansas)
- Mitchell Building-First State Bank Building, Kentucky
- Louisiana State Bank Building
- Ruston State Bank, Louisiana
- Tensas State Bank hostage crisis, Louisiana
- Citizens State Bank (Odenton, Maryland)
- Huron Valley State Bank, Michigan
- Negaunee State Bank Building, Michigan
- Pioneer State Bank No. 36, Michigan
- Exchange State Bank, Minnesota
- Milroy State Bank Building, Minnesota
- First State Bank (St. Joseph, Minnesota)
- First State Bank of Le Roy, Minnesota
- Payne Avenue State Bank, Minnesota
- First State Bank of Chester, Montana
- Dayton State Bank, Montana
- Farmers and Merchants State Bank (Eureka, Montana)
- Lavina State Bank, Montana
- Three Valleys State Bank, Montana
- Rock Creek State Bank, Montana
- State Bank of Townsend, Montana
- Farmers State Bank (Adams, Nebraska)
- People's State Bank (Diller, Nebraska)
- Germantown State Bank Building, Nebraska
- Nevada State Bank
- Silver State Bank, Nevada
- First National State Bank Building, New Jersey
- National State Bank (Camden, New Jersey)
- National State Bank Building, Troy, New York
- State Bank of North Carolina
- Milton State Bank, North Carolina
- State Bank of Antler, North Dakota
- First State Bank of Buxton, North Dakota
- Forest River State Bank, North Dakota
- State Bank of Edinburg, North Dakota
- Granville State Bank, North Dakota
- Portal State Bank, North Dakota
- Albion State Bank, Oklahoma
- Oregon State Bank
- Benton County State Bank, Oregon
- Monroe State Bank, Oregon
- Delmont State Bank, South Dakota
- First State Bank of Hazel, South Dakota
- Citizens State Bank of Henry, South Dakota
- Ipswich State Bank, South Dakota
- First State Bank Building (Revillo, South Dakota)
- Security State Bank (Willow Lake, South Dakota)
- Wakonda State Bank, South Dakota
- Woonsocket State Bank, South Dakota
- State Bank of Tennessee
- Texas State Bank
- American State Bank, Texas
- Happy State Bank Stadium, Texas
- State National Bank (El Paso, Texas)
- Farmers State Bank (Georgetown, Texas)
- State National Bank Building (Houston, Texas)
- Union State Bank, Florence, Texas
- Farmers State Bank (Georgetown, Texas)
- State Bank of Southern Utah
- State Bank of Wisconsin
- Union State Bank, Wisconsin
- Citizens State Bank of Gillett, Wisconsin
- Glidden State Bank, Wisconsin
- Horicon State Bank, Wisconsin
- State Bank of Spring Green, Wisconsin
- Kraft State Bank robbery, Wisconsin
- First State Bank of Baggs, Wyoming
- Sundance State Bank Building, Wyoming

== See also ==
- National Bank Act
- Bank of North Dakota (only state-owned bank in the United States)
