= Union State Bank =

Union State Bank may refer to one of the following banks in the United States:

- Union State Bank, Alabama
- Union State Bank, Florence, Texas, 1928
- Union State Bank, Wisconsin
