= Old State Bank =

Old State Bank may refer to:

- Old State Bank (Decatur, Alabama), Decatur, Alabama
- Old State Bank (Vincennes, Indiana), Vincennes, Indiana

== See also ==
- Old Bunnell State Bank Building, Bunnell, Florida
