= Ralph Loring =

American architect

Ralph Stoodley Loring
- Born: November 13, 1879; Somerville, Massachusetts
- Died: May 15, 1948 (aged 68); East San Gabriel, California
- Occupation: Architect

Ralph Stoodley Loring (1879-1948), known professionally as Ralph Loring, was an architect of Lewiston, Idaho.

== Life and career ==
Ralph Stoodley Loring was born November 13, 1879, in Somerville, Massachusetts to George Fullington and Sarah Frances (Johnson) Loring. His father was an architect. Loring attended the public schools before entering the Massachusetts Institute of Technology, graduating in 1901 with a degree in civil engineering. He initially worked as a draftsman.

In 1905 he went to Boise, Idaho as superintendent of reconstruction of the United States barracks in that city. In 1906 he went to Lewiston as manager of a branch office for architects John E. Tourtellotte & Company. This office was closed in 1910, and Loring established his own practice in Lewiston. In 1924 he relocated to Pasadena, California, becoming associated with an architecture firm there. He practiced architecture in California for the remainder of his career.

== Personal life ==
Loring married in 1907 to Linnie Marie Hubbell of Milford, Michigan.

Loring died May 15, 1948, at home in East San Gabriel, California at the age of 68.

== Legacy ==
Loring was an architect of a number of buildings which have been listed on the United States National Register of Historic Places.

== Works include (Note: Works dated before 1910 designed as an associate of John E. Tourtellotte & Company.) ==
- Idaho Grocery Warehouse and Annex, 1209 Main St, Lewiston, Idaho (1907 and 1911, NRHP November 17, 1982)
- Lewiston City Hall (former), 207 3rd St, Lewiston, Idaho (1909, NRHP November 17, 1982)
- State Bank of Kamiah, ID-64 Kamiah, Idaho (1909–10, NRHP 1978)
- Lewiston Vineyards Gates, 18th Ave and 10th St, Lewiston, Idaho (1910, NRHP 1983)
- State Bank of Kooskia, 1 S Main St, Kooskia, Idaho (1912, NRHP 1978)

== Gallery of architectural works ==
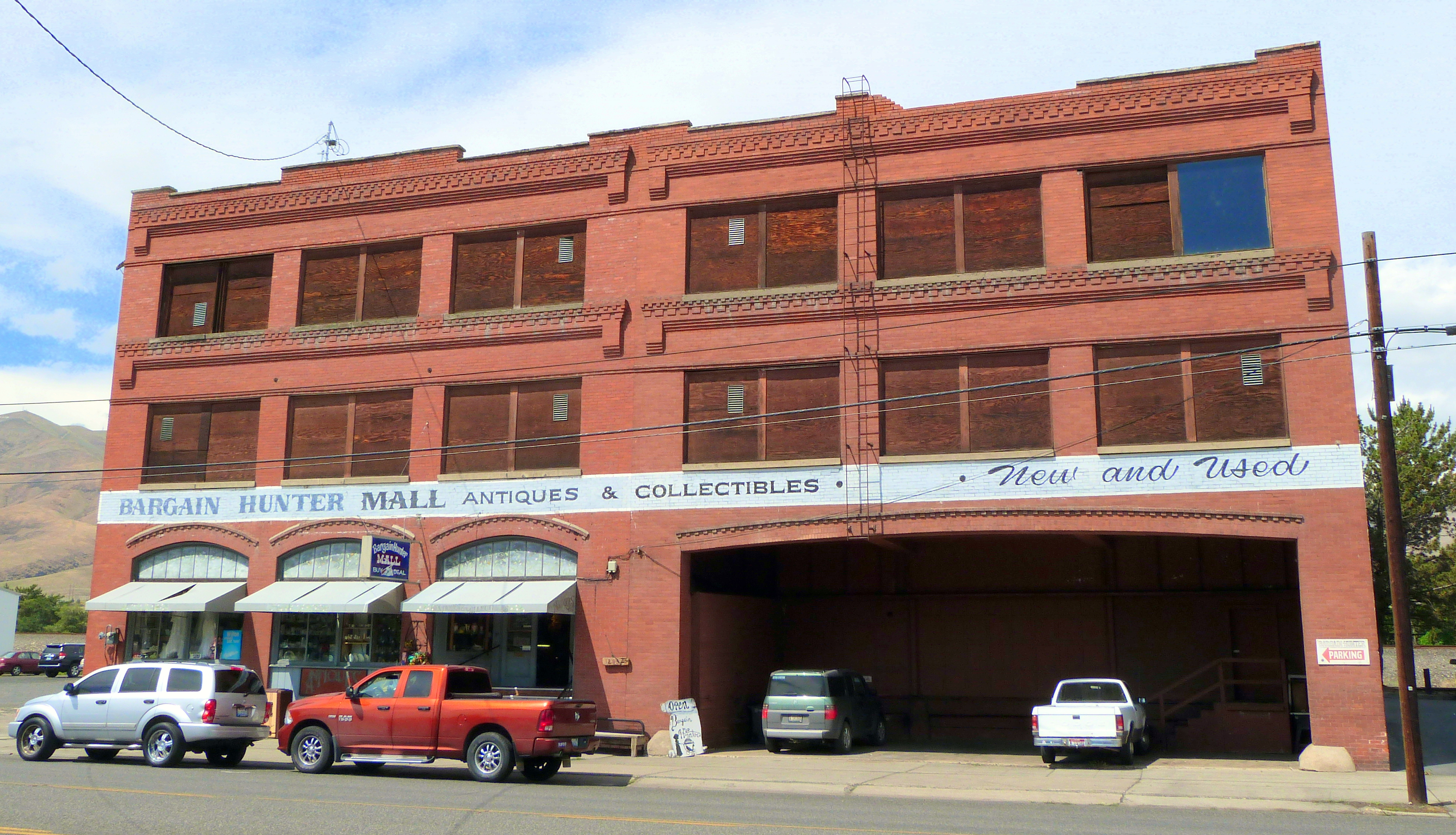
Idaho Grocery Warehouse and Annex, Lewiston, Idaho, 1907 and 1911.

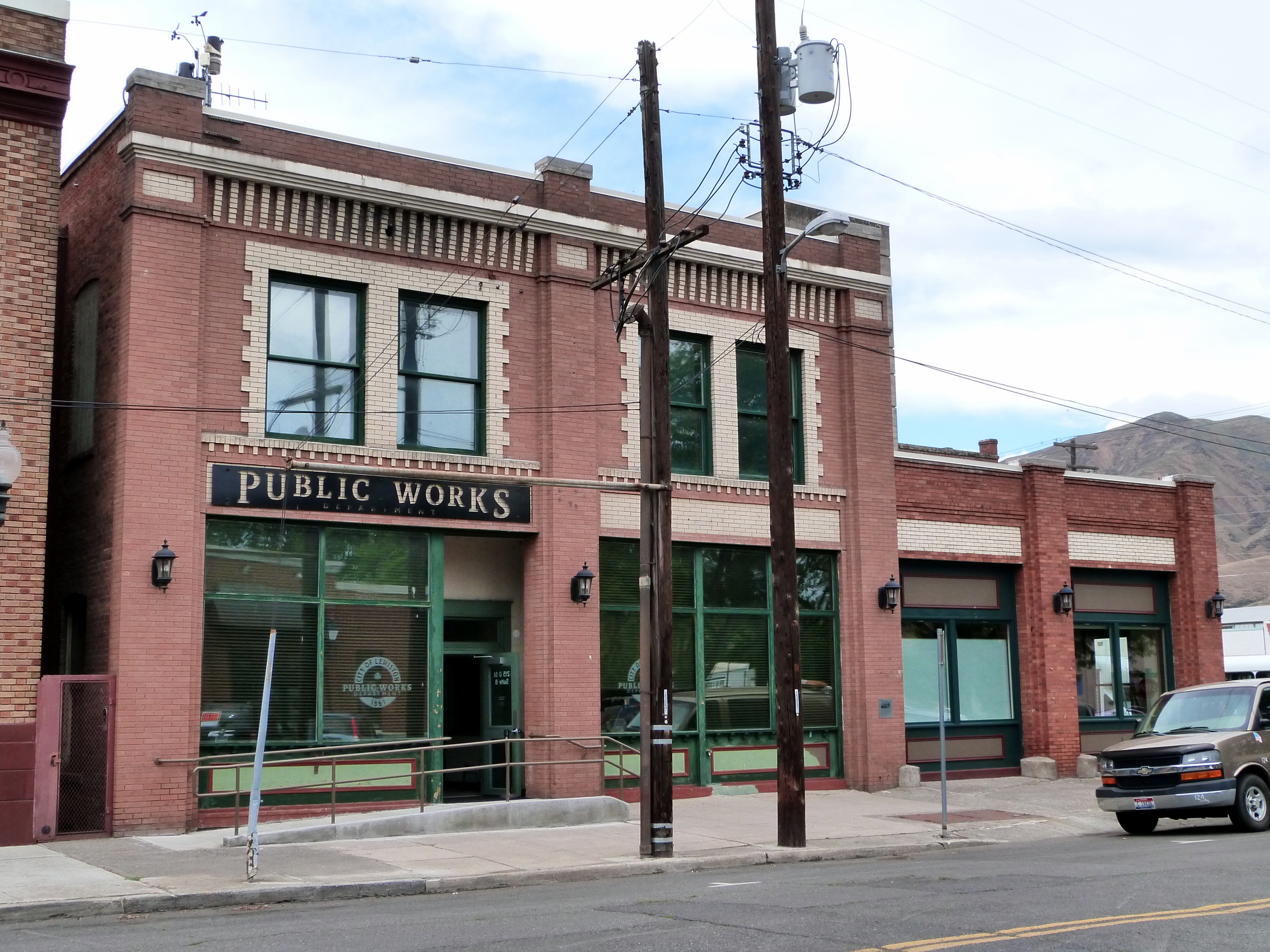
Lewiston City Hall, Lewiston, Idaho, 1909.

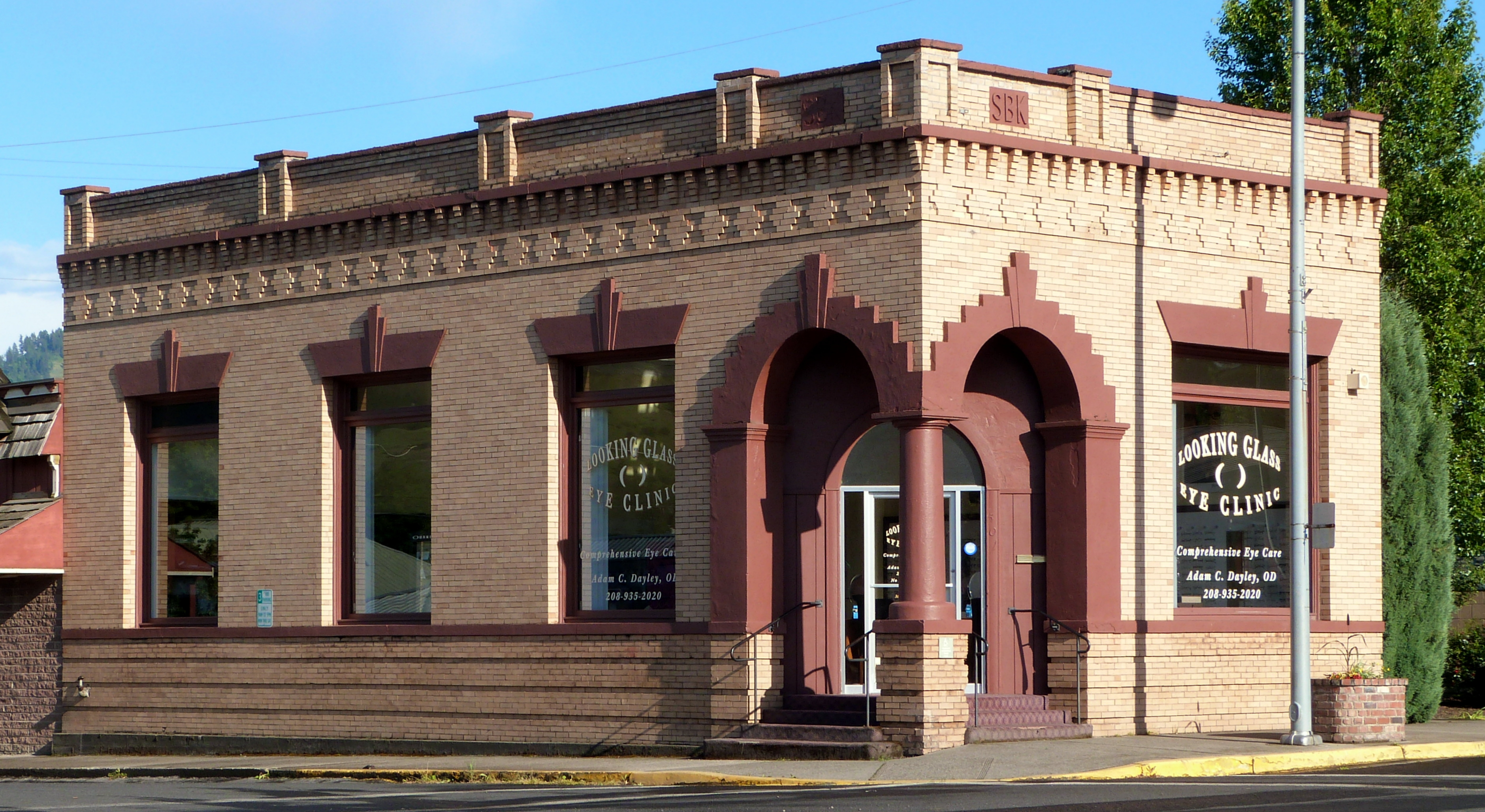
State Bank of Kamiah, Kamiah, Idaho, 1909-10.

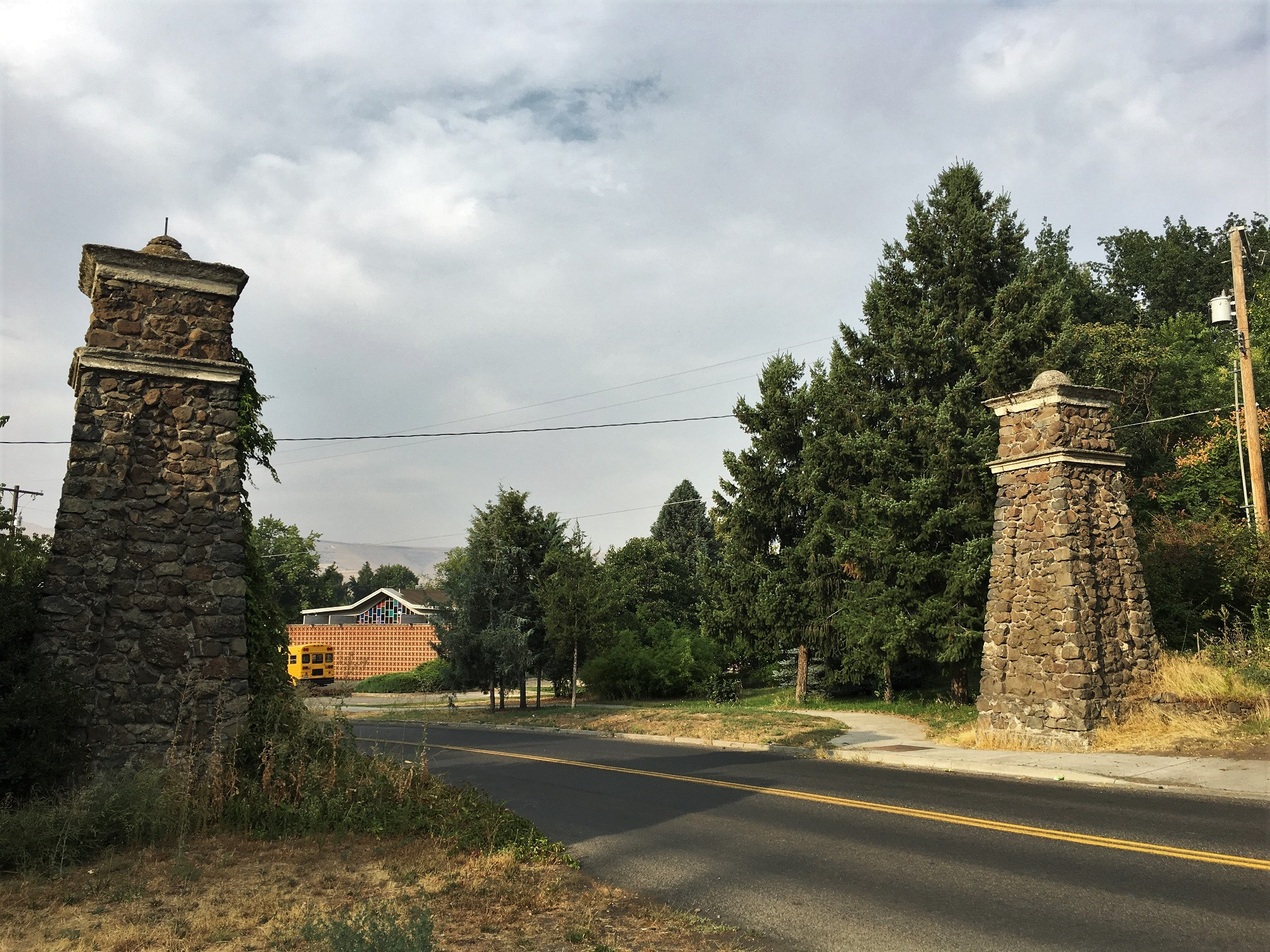
Lewiston Vineyards Gates, Lewiston, Idaho, 1910.

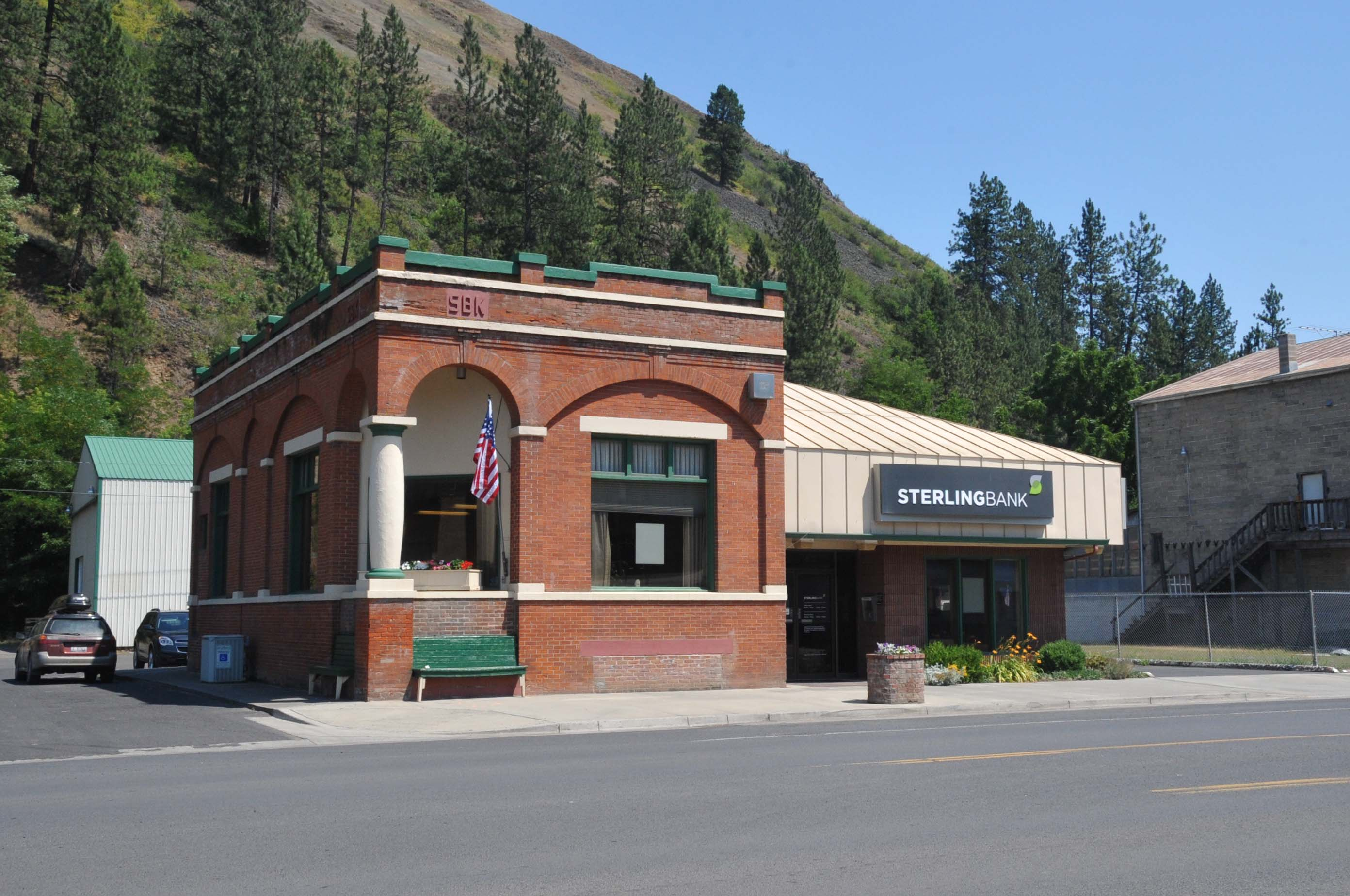
State Bank of Kooskia, Kooskia, Idaho, 1912.
