= Wintrust Arena =

Indoor arena in Chicago, Illinois, U.S.

Wintrust Arena at McCormick Square

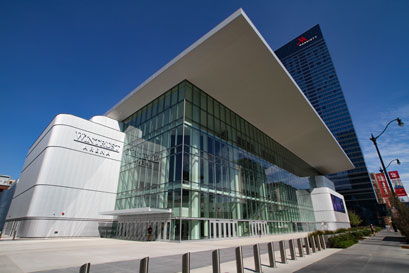
- Wintrust Arena in May 2018
- Interactive map of Wintrust Arena at McCormick Square
- Address: 200 East Cermak Road
- Location: Chicago, Illinois, U.S.
- Coordinates: 41°51′13″N 87°37′17″W
- Owner: Metropolitan Pier and Exposition Authority
- Operator: Oak View Group
- Capacity: 10,387
- Public transit: Green at Cermak–McCormick Place; ME at McCormick Place

Construction
- Groundbreaking: November 16, 2015
- Opened: October 14, 2017
- Cost: $173 million
- Architects: Pelli Clarke Pelli Architects; Moody Nolan (architect of record); AECOM (sports architect)
- Services engineer: IMEG Corp.
- General contractor: Clark Construction

Tenants
- DePaul Blue Demons men's basketball (NCAA) (2017–present); DePaul Blue Demons women's basketball (NCAA) (2017–present); Chicago Sky (WNBA) (2018–present)

Website
- wintrustarena.com

Wintrust Arena at McCormick Square, previously referred to as DePaul Arena or McCormick Place Events Center, is a 10,387-seat sports venue in the Near South Side community area of Chicago that opened in 2017. It is the current home court for the men's and women's basketball teams of DePaul University and serves as an events center for McCormick Place. It also is the home of the Chicago Sky of the Women's National Basketball Association (WNBA).

The arena was announced in May 2013, with construction planned to begin in 2014, and use expected to begin with the 2016–17 season. The start of construction was delayed to November 2015, with completion delayed until the 2017–18 season. Although DePaul had been seeking a new home arena—it had used Allstate Arena in suburban Rosemont since 1980—it rejected a 10-year offer in November 2012 to play rent free at the United Center. Instead, DePaul planned to use Allstate Arena on a recurring one-year basis until it had a new home. On November 16, 2016, DePaul and the Metropolitan Pier and Exposition Authority (MPEA or "McPier") announced that the new event center at McCormick Square would be called Wintrust Arena. The announcement came after the signing of a letter of intent that contemplated a definitive 15-year sponsorship agreement between DePaul and Wintrust.

== Planned construction ==
At the outset there were two different interpretations of the planned venue. ESPN has interpreted the plan as a 10,000-seat arena with a cost to tax payers of $103 million and total cost of $175 million. The Chicago Sun-Times has interpreted the plan as a 12,000-seat arena with public funding of $125 million out of a total spending of $300 million.

=== Original 12,000-seat plan ===
Before the actual announcement, the arena was publicized by the Chicago Sun-Times as a 12,000-seat arena that would cost $300 million. After the announcement, the Chicago Sun-Times reported an expected 12,000-seat venue, but with $125 million coming from public funds.

=== 10,000-seat plan ===
Upon announcement, ESPN reported the expected cost of the 10,000-seat arena, located on Cermak Road between Indiana and Prairie Avenue, across the street from McCormick Place was $173 million. The funding came from three sources: $70 million from the university, $70 million from a McPier bond fund, and $33 million from public taxes (i.e., $103 million from public funds). It was built to host concerts, conventions, and other events in addition to DePaul Basketball games. As the building approached completion, its capacity was announced as 10,387 seats for basketball.

== Funding ==
The decision for public participation in the funding of DePaul's athletic facility was controversial because it was announced six days prior to the Board of Education's decision to close 50 public schools due to a $1 billion deficit. When the Chicago City Council approved funding on July 24, 2013, the Chicago Reader reported the vote as though money was taken from the schools and spent on the arena because the spending plan included $68 million in budget cuts for the Chicago Public Schools. The Chicago Tribune revealed that the land for the project had not yet been acquired four days after the City Hall funding vote.

== Construction ==
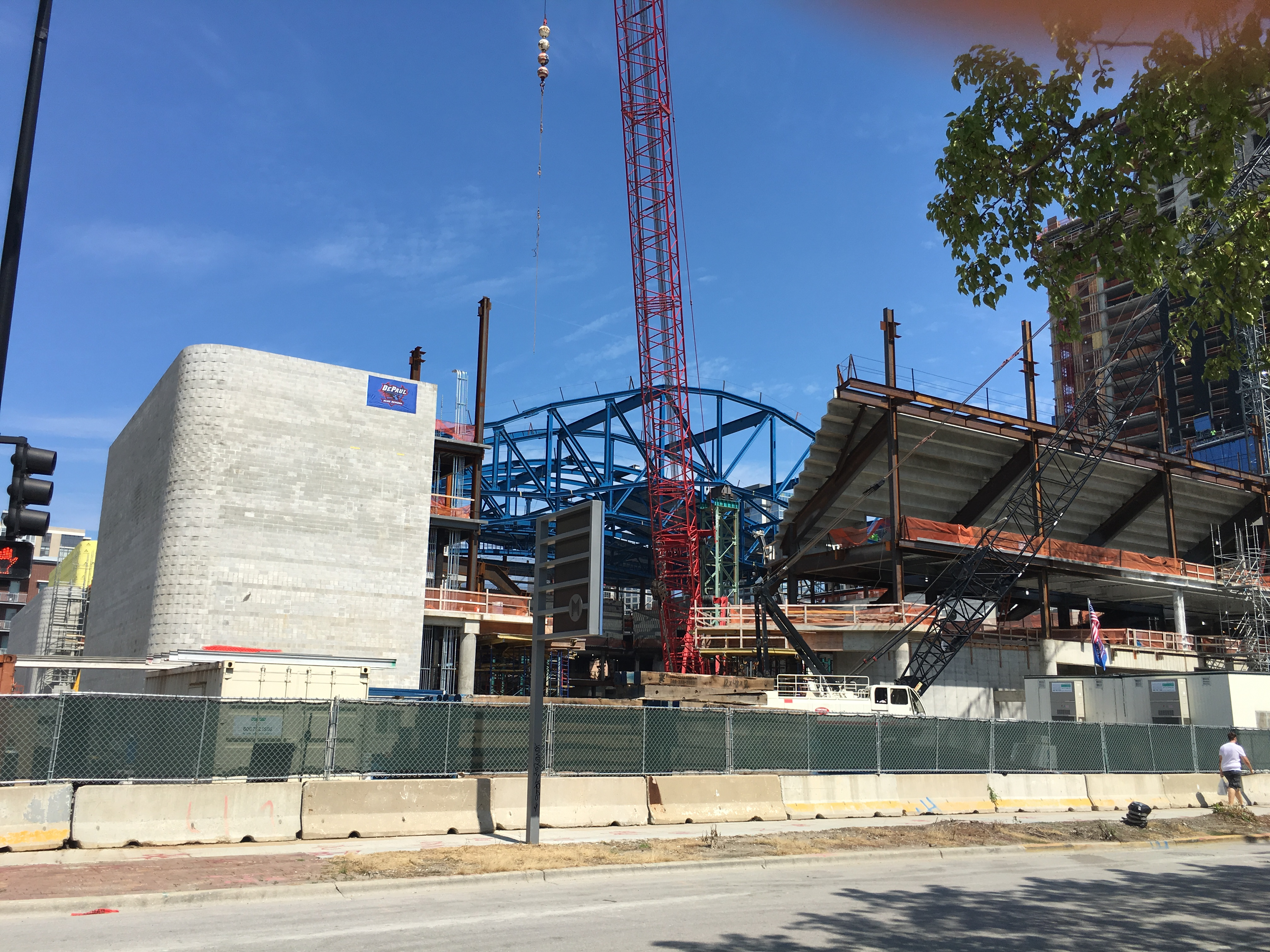
Wintrust Arena under construction in August 2016

On November 16, 2015, Chicago Mayor Rahm Emanuel, officials from DePaul University and McCormick Place attended the ceremonial groundbreaking for the center. At the time of the groundbreaking, the construction was expected to result in a 10,000-seat venue at the corner of Cermak Road and Indiana Avenue and expected to be completed at some time in 2017. At the time, the DePaul Athletics department expected the 2017–18 DePaul Blue Demons to be able to host their season opener at the venue, but the venue was expected to double as an events center for McCormick Place. The Center was expected to create 7,400 construction jobs and 2,500 permanent jobs.

The city issued a "new construction" building permit to McPier on March 23, 2016, for the full building. Previously issued permits allowed the construction of foundations and shear walls.

== History and events ==
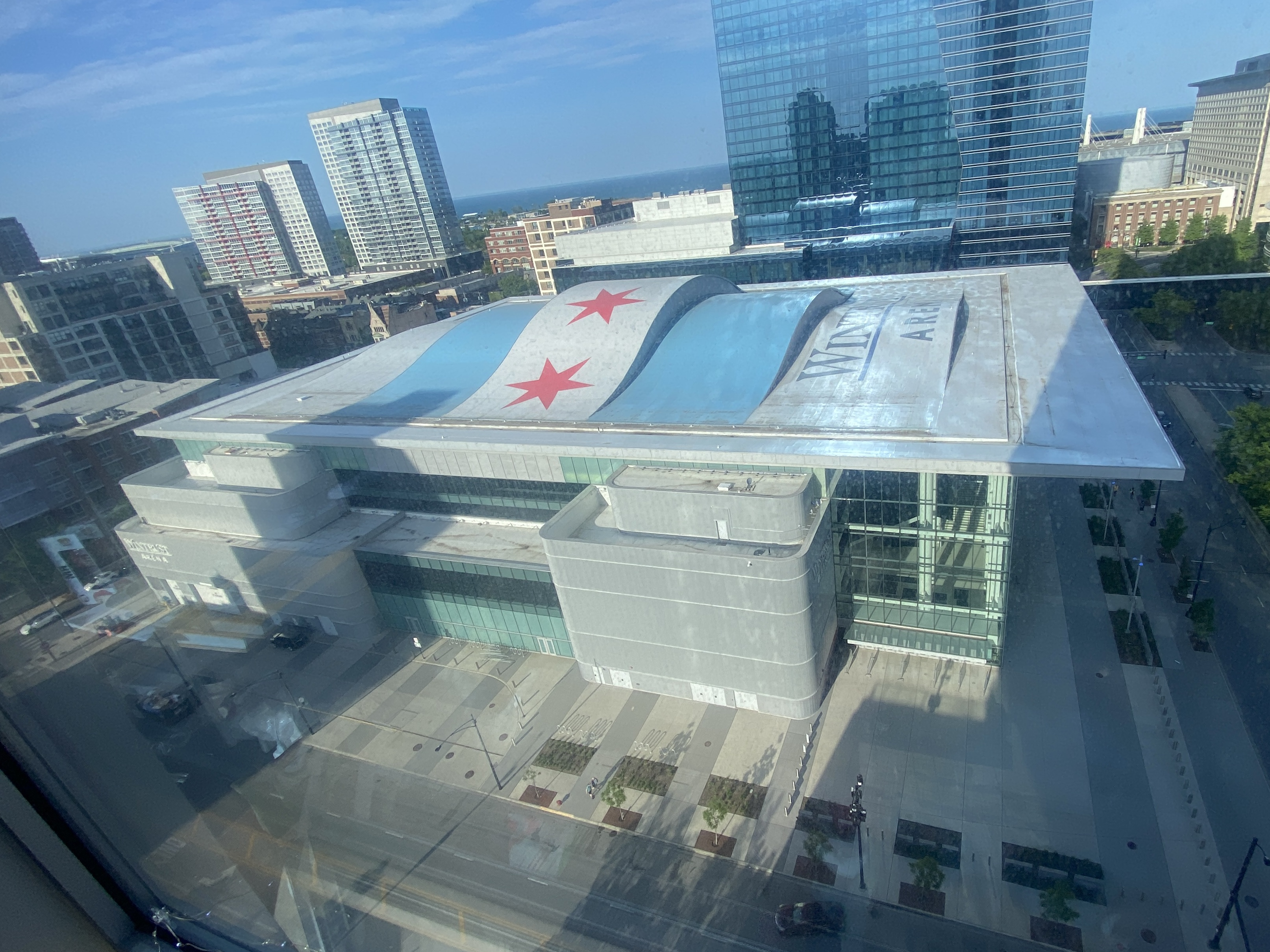
The arena and its distinctive roof, as viewed from a nearby building

After being referred to as both DePaul Arena and McCormick Place Events Center, MPEA and DePaul announced a 15-year naming rights agreement for the complex with Wintrust Financial under the name Wintrust Arena on November 16, 2016.

On July 25, 2017, MPEA announced that it had reached a five-year agreement with the Chicago Sky to play their home games at the arena starting with all 17 home games for the 2018 WNBA season after having played the previous eight seasons at Allstate Arena. The arena's first event was a concert by REO Speedwagon on September 25 that was reserved for attendees of the annual convention of the True Value hardware company. The opening ceremony was held on October 14, 2017, with the event also featuring the season-opening practices for the 2017–18 DePaul men's and women's teams. The first major public event (a concert featuring Bob Dylan and Mavis Staples) took place on October 27. By that time, the arena had been announced as the host of the Big East women's basketball tournament for 2018–2020.

The arena was used for some Junior Basketball Association games for the inaugural 2018 JBA season, especially some games holding the Chicago Ballers franchise. However, it did not hold the 2018 JBA All-Star Event/Game.

=== Other events ===
The arena housed the primary panel stage for the Star Wars Celebration held in Chicago in 2019. From the stage in the arena, cast and crew revealed first looks at franchise productions including Star Wars: The Rise of Skywalker and The Mandalorian, and featured celebrity guests including Stephen Colbert, J. J. Abrams, Daisy Ridley, Billy Dee Williams, Jon Favreau, and Pedro Pascal.

Mayor Lori Lightfoot was inaugurated at the arena on May 20, 2019.

On February 14, 2020, the arena hosted the 2020 NBA All-Star Celebrity Game.

On February 29, 2020, the arena hosted an All Elite Wrestling (AEW) event, Revolution.

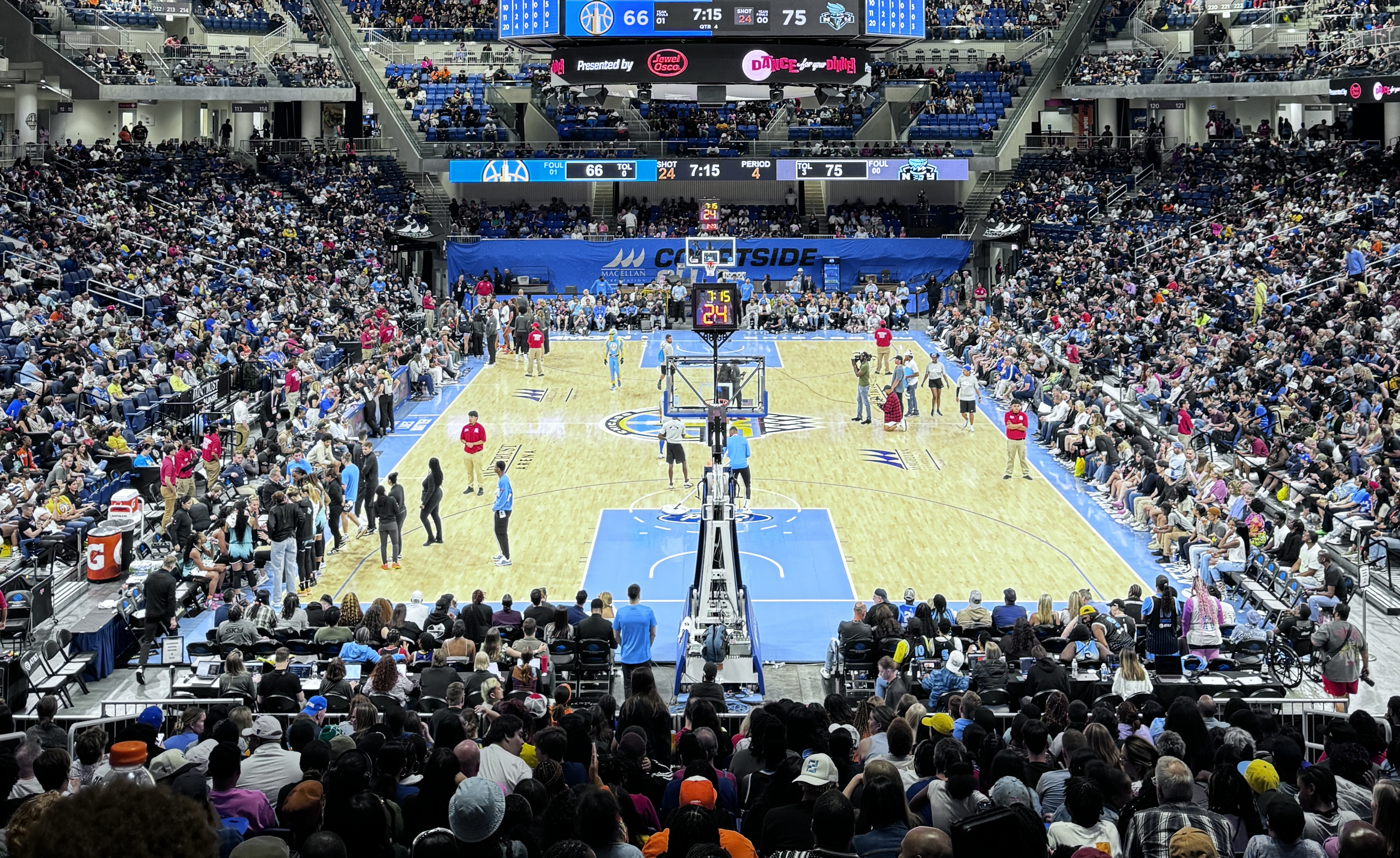
Wintrust Arena is home to the WNBA team, The Chicago Sky

In October 2021, Wintrust Arena hosted Games 3 and 4 of the WNBA Finals, during which the Chicago Sky defeated the Phoenix Mercury to capture the team's first championship. Both home games featured sell-out capacity crowds of 10,387.

On November 24, 2021, AEW returned to the arena to film that week's special Thanksgiving and Black Friday episodes of their weekly television shows AEW Dynamite and AEW Rampage. It hosted the event as annual tradition from 2021 to 2024. In 2025, the Thanksgiving and Black Friday episodes were moved to The Pinnacle in Nashville, Tennessee, ending Chicago tradition.

On February 5, 2022, the arena hosted a high school basketball game between two of the top-ranked teams in the country, #14 Sierra Canyon from Chatsworth, California (21-3) and #19 Glenbard West from Glen Ellyn, Illinois (26-0). A total of nearly 10,000 fans watched the game. Sierra Canyon beat Glenbard West 67-64 on a last second buzzer beater by Dylan Metoyer.

From May 12-May 19, 2024, the arena hosted the NBA draft combine.

On November 29, 2025, Real American Freestyle presented RAF 03 from the arena, an event that was broadcast live on Fox Nation.

On September 4, 2026, the arena hosted the largest indoor women's collegiate volleyball game in Illinois history between the DePaul Blue Demons and the #1 ranked Nebraska Cornhuskers. The event was attended by 8,786 fans. Nebraska would win the game 3-0.

== See also ==
- List of NCAA Division I basketball arenas

Tenants
Preceded by Allstate Arena	Home of Chicago Sky; 2018 – present	Succeeded by current
Preceded by Allstate Arena	Home of DePaul Blue Demons men's basketball 2018 – present	Succeeded by current
Preceded by Sullivan Athletic Center	Home of DePaul Blue Demons women's basketball 2018 – present	Succeeded by current
