= Huron Valley State Bank =

Community bank in Michigan

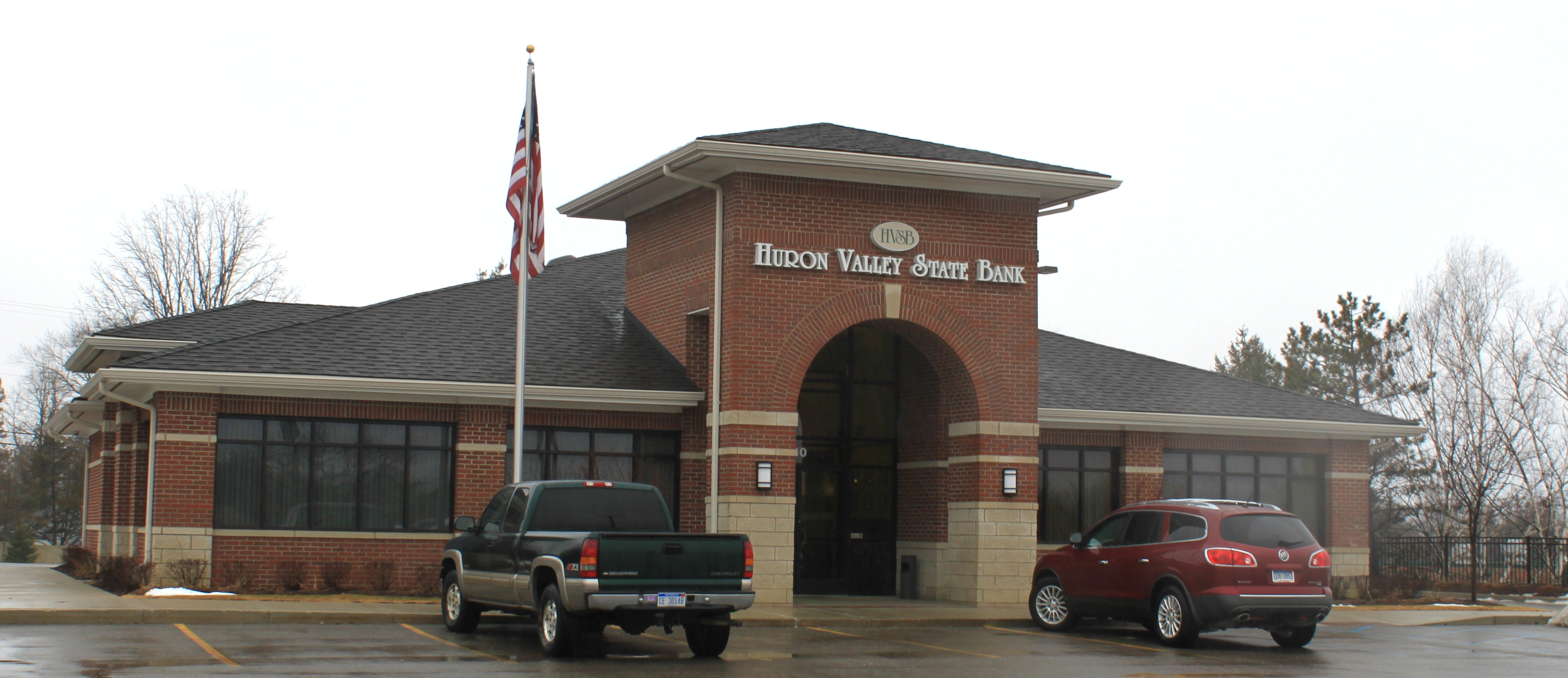
- HVSB's Main Branch in Milford, Michigan
- Trade name: HVSB
- Type: Public
- Traded as: OTCID Basic Current: HVLM
- Industry: Banking; Financial services
- Founded: 2005; 21 years ago
- Headquarters: 130 South Milford Road; Milford, Michigan 48381
- Number of locations: 3 Branches; 1 Financial Center; 3 ATMs (2026)
- Area served: Detroit Metropolitan Area
- Key people: Jack Shubitowski (CEO); Peter Scodeller (chairman); J. Grant Smith (CEO, 2006-2007); David H. Blossey (CEO, 2005-2006)
- Services: Consumer banking, Corporate banking, Financial analysis, Mortgage loans, Credit cards, Card Services
- Net income: ▲US$2.9 million (2025); US$2.8 million (2024)
- Total assets: ▲US$270,373,000 (2025); US$245,328,000 (2024)
- Number of employees: 11-50 (2026)
- Parent: Huron Valley Bancorp, Inc.
- Website: hvsb.com

Huron Valley State Bank (HVSB) is a community bank operating in Southeast Michigan overseen by a group of local investors. The bank operates 2 full service retail branches, a financial center, and 3 ATMs throughout the Detroit Metropolitan Area.

Established in 2005 by Clarkston Financial Corporation as a de-novo bank, Huron Valley State Bank became independent of Clarkston 3 years later in 2008.

In October 2026, the bank publicly announced that it had entered into a definitive agreement to be acquired by the Bank of Ann Arbor.

== History ==
=== Clarkston State Bank ===
In December 2004, Clarkston Financial Corporation, the holding company for Clarkston State Bank, announced its plan to open a new bank in Milford, Michigan in July 2005.

Edwin L. Adler, then board chairman of Clarkston Financial Corporation, revealed that the bank would be replacing a loan production office on North Main Street that Clarkston State Bank had opened earlier that month. Huron Valley State Bank began with David H. Blossey serving as director, president and CEO.

Due to apparent financial pressure from commercial loans, Clarkston Financial Corporation divested its share of Huron Valley State Bank in 2005.

In June 2019, Clarkston Financial Corporation was acquired by Waterford Bancorp, Inc.

=== Bank Branches ===
In August 2005, the first Huron Valley State Bank branch opened its doors to the public. The Main Street branch was located in the Mill Valley Center at 525 North Main Street. The singular branch housed the entirety of the bank's operations until the opening of the bank's first Lending Center in 2012.

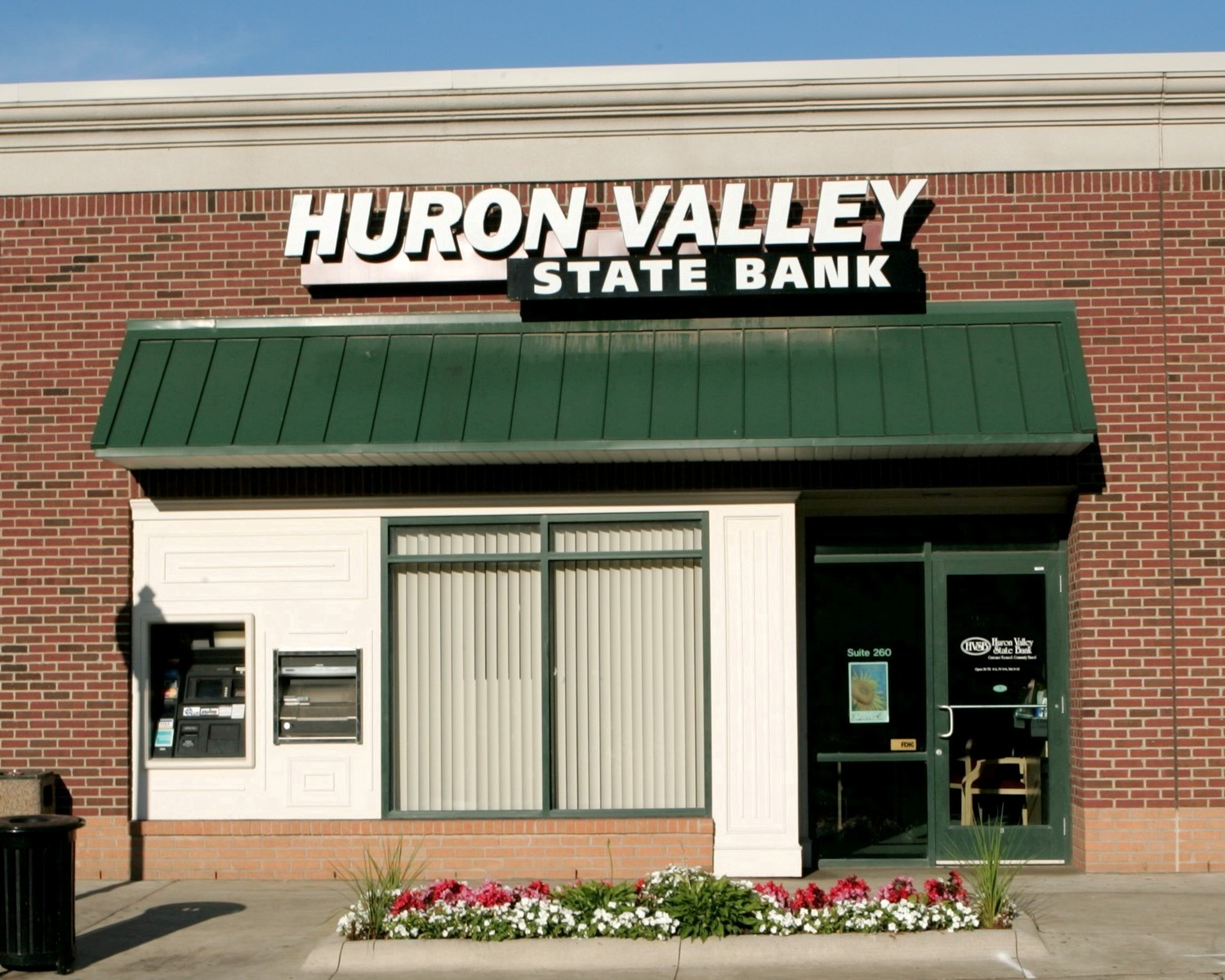
Former Main Street Branch

In October 2008, the retail branch was relocated to its current home in the south side of Milford on South Milford Road. The majority of the bank's operations remained in this branch until the opening of the Financial Center in 2018.

In November of 2008, following the acquisition of a closed Fifth Third Bank Branch, the Milford location was accompanied by a second branch. The branch is located in Highland on the southeast corner of the M-59 and Duck Lake Road intersection.

=== Loan Centers, Financial Centers and ATMs ===
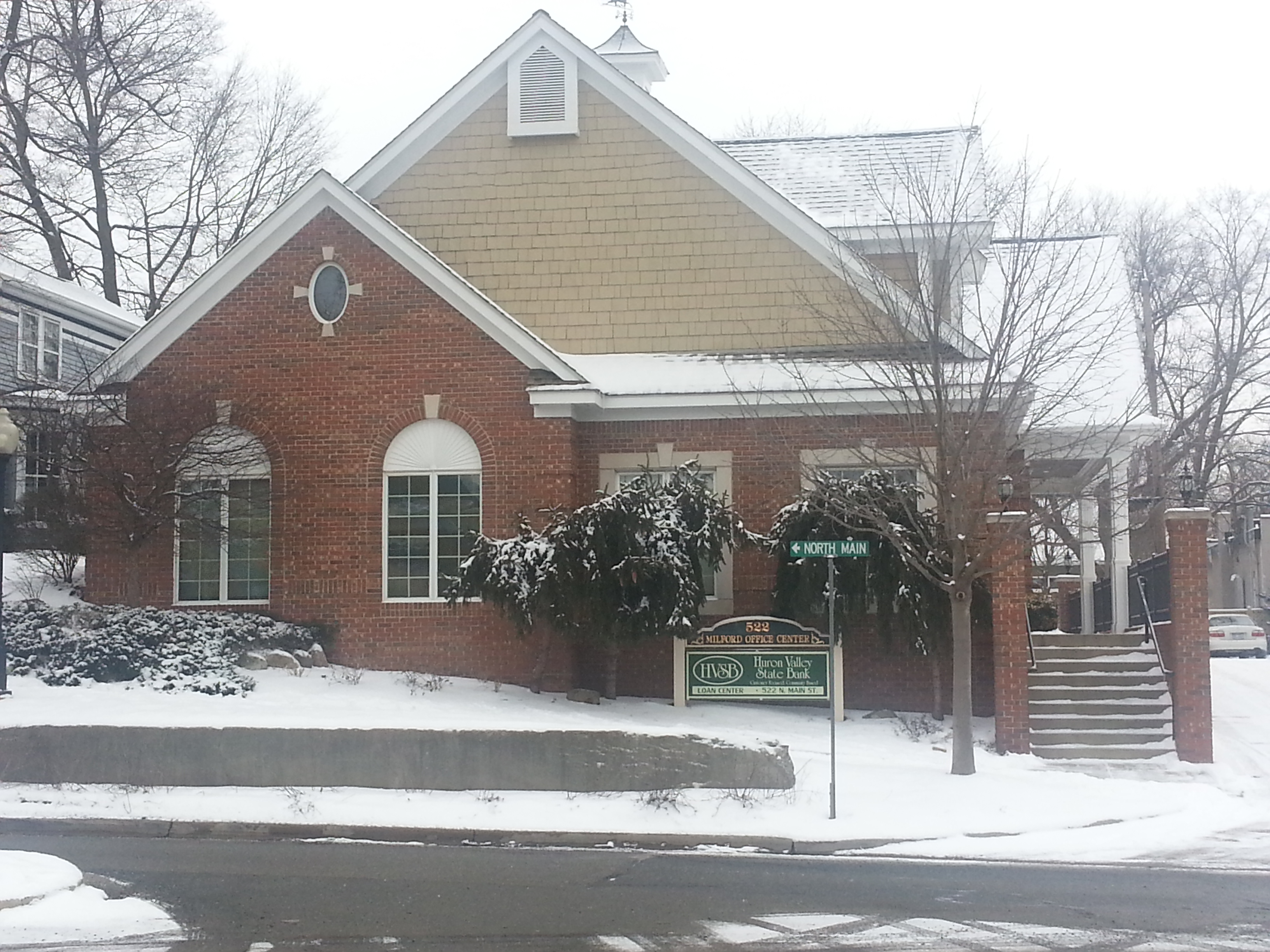
HVSB's Former Milford Lending Center

In June 2012, the bank's former Main Street Lending Center was opened at 522 North Main Street in Milford. The center was located across the street from the original branch on Main Street between the Flat Iron Building and Commerce Road.

In September 2017, the bank opened its first freestanding ATM. The machine was positioned in the parking lot in front of Holden’s Party Store across from the entrance of Kensington Metropark. The original ATM at that location was initially attached to the storefront of Holden's and was subsequently destroyed by a fire that occurred in the store on September 2, 2015.

In August 2018, the bank opened its newest facility, the Financial Center. The Financial Center is located directly behind Holden’s Party Store. This branch was purposed to house the bank’s lending and operations activities.

In May 2023, the bank expanded outside of Oakland County into neighboring Wayne County with the former Plymouth Loan Center. The branch was located in the downtown area, near the corner of Linden Street and Main Street.

=== Bank of Ann Arbor ===
In October 2026, Huron Valley Bancorp, Inc. announced that it had entered into a definitive agreement to be acquired by Arbor Bancorp, Inc., the holding company of Bank of Ann Arbor. The acquisition is expected to close in late 2026 or early 2027. Upon completion, the combined bank is expected to operate 21 locations throughout Michigan.

== Awards ==
- 5 Star rating from Bauer Financial (Ongoing as of 2023)
- “People's Choice” by the Spinal Column for 9 Consecutive years (2022)
- Michigan Bankers Association’s (MBA) Financial Literacy Award (2020 and 2022)
- Metro Detroit’s "Best and Brightest Companies to Work For" for 4 Consecutive Years (2021)
- Top 200 Publicly Traded Community Banks and Thrifts by American Banker Magazine (2021)
- Huron Valley Chamber of Commerce's "Rise to the Occasion" Award (December 2020)
- Huron Valley American Veterans Post 2006’s Patriotism Award (2018)
- “Best Bank” Award by Milford Times for 8 Consecutive Years (2018)
- Jack Shubitowski (CEO) Selected "Citizen of the Year" by the Huron Valley Chamber of Commerce (January 2017)

== Branches ==
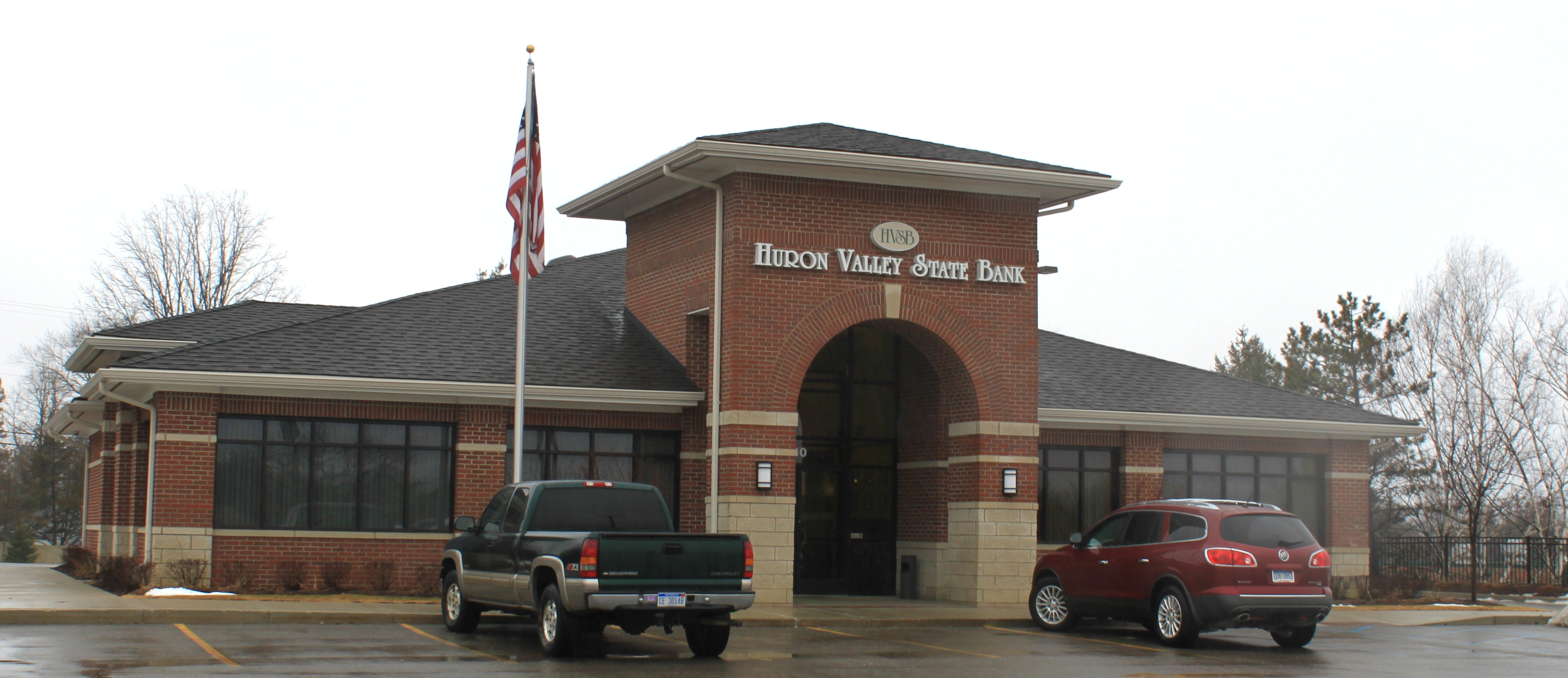
Milford Branch - 130 South Milford Road, Milford, Michigan

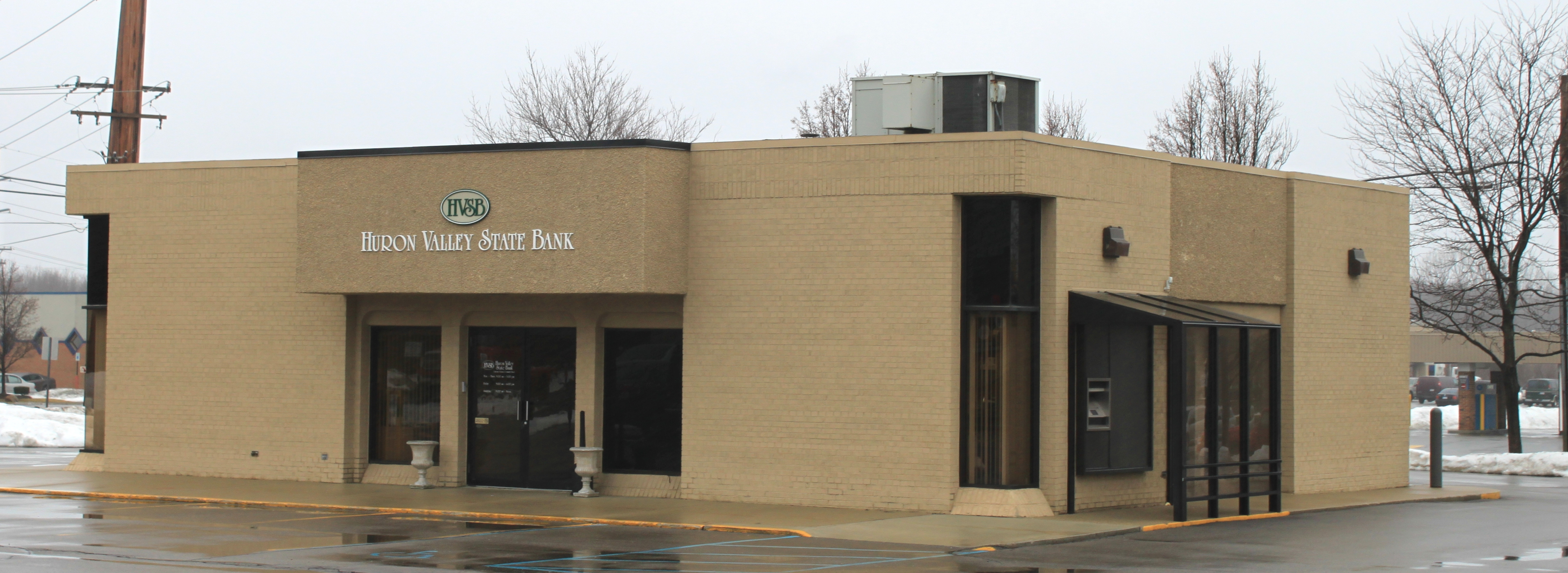
Highland Branch - 2920 East Highland Road, Highland, Michigan

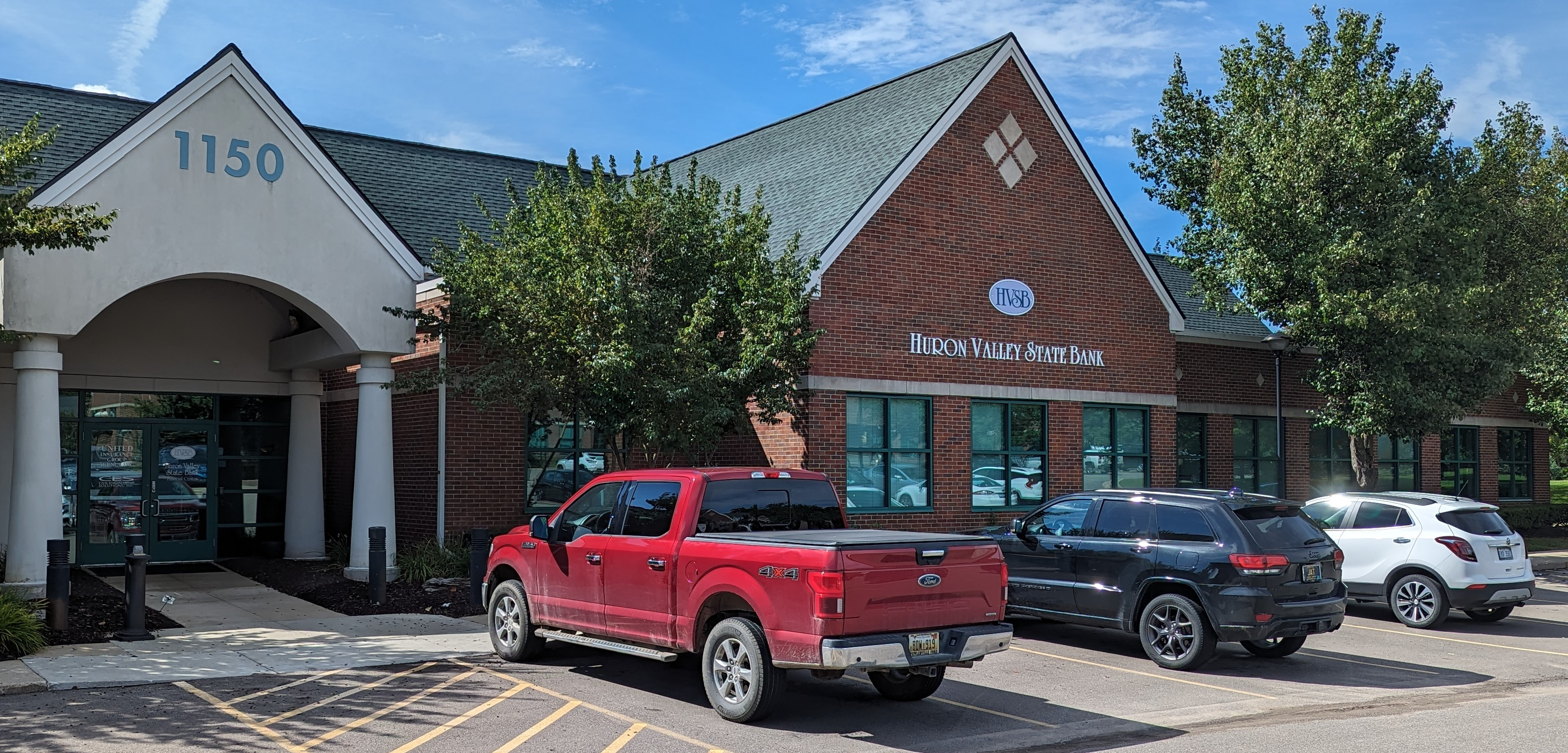
Financial Center - 1150 Corporate Office Drive, Suite 100, Milford, Michigan

== Former Branches ==
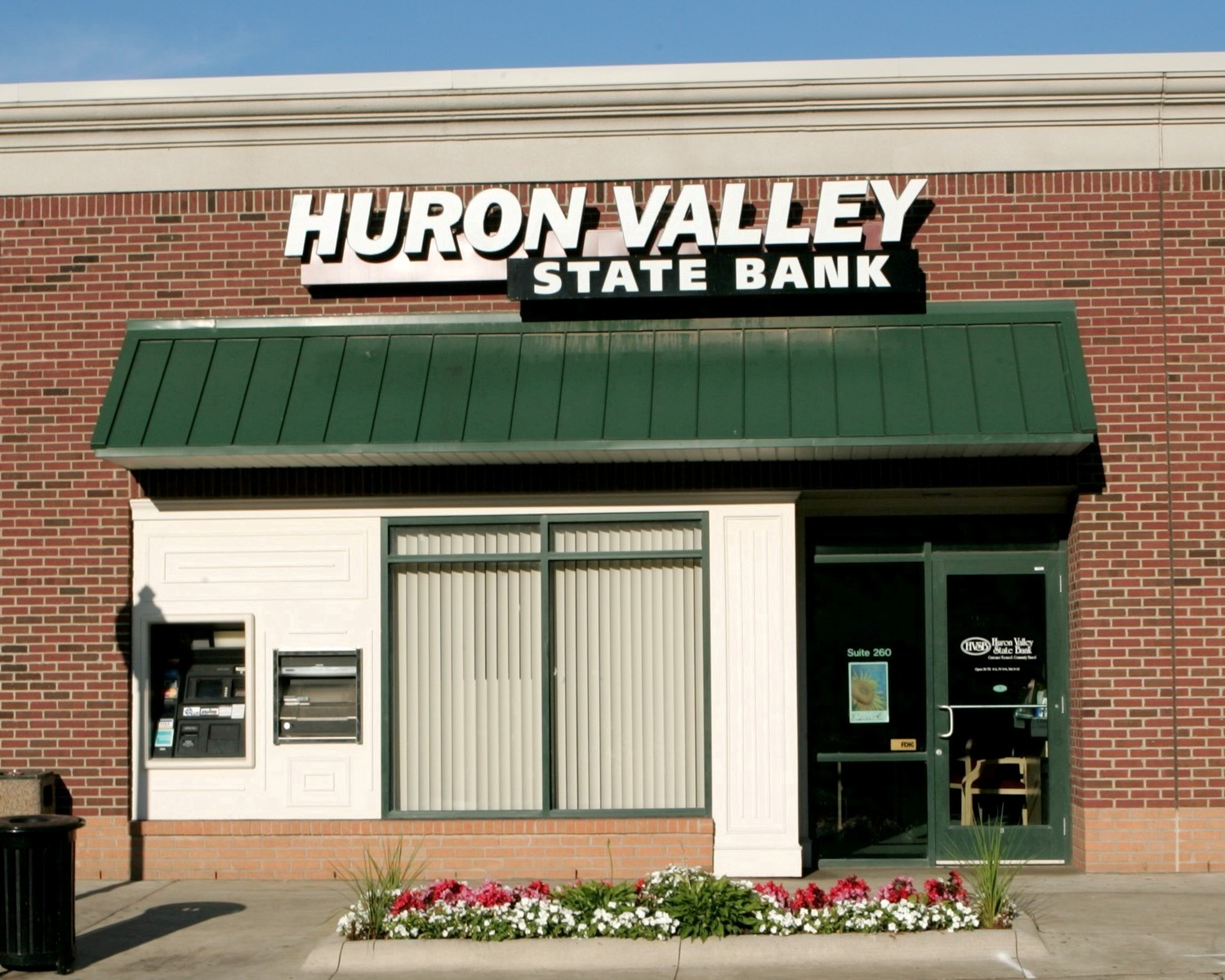
Former Branch - 525 North Main Street, Milford, Michigan

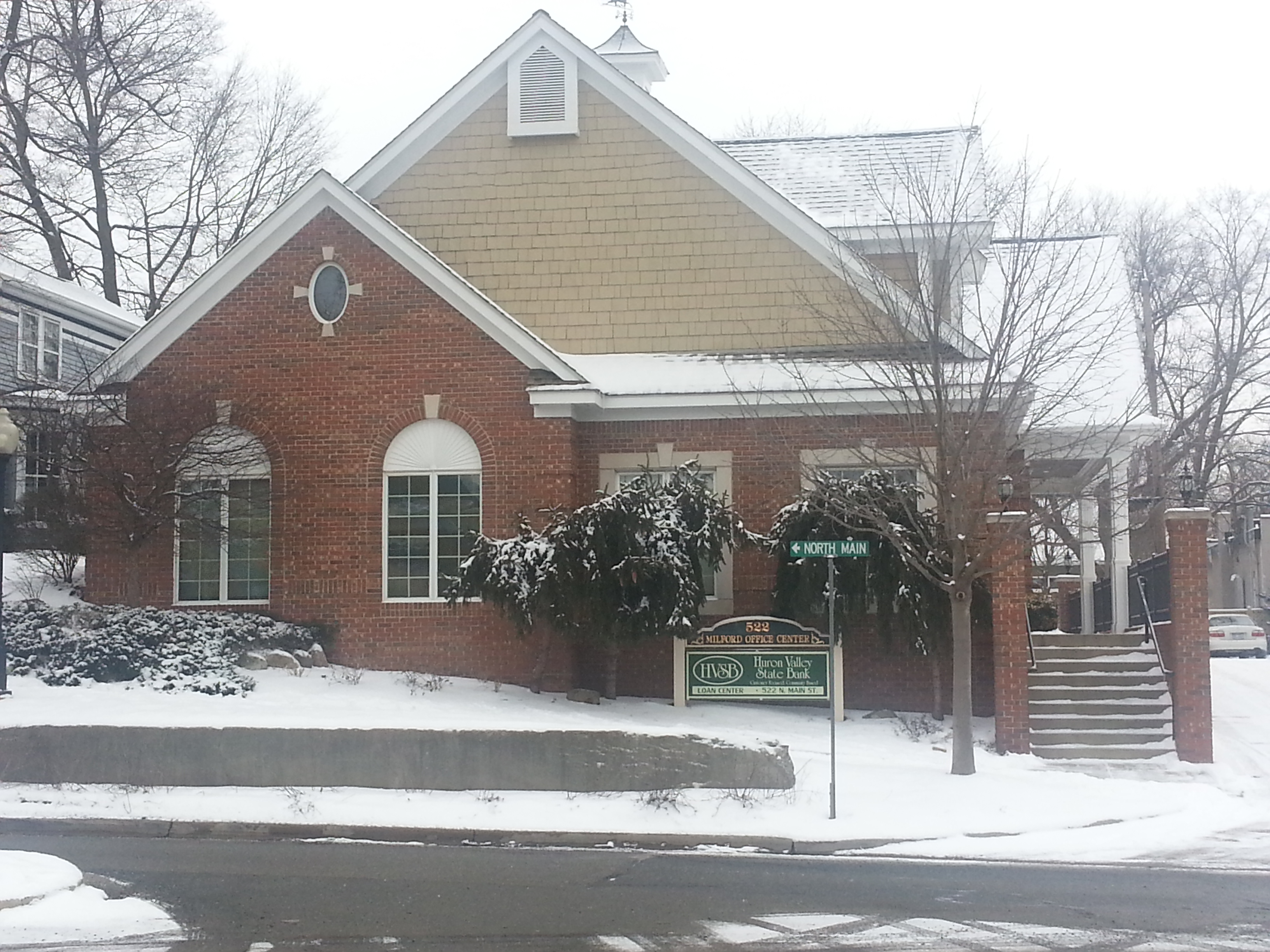
Former Milford Loan Center - 522 North Main Street, Milford, Michigan

Former Plymouth Loan Center - 706 South Main Street, Plymouth, Michigan
