= Fuerste House =

Historic house in Iowa, United States

- U.S. National Register of Historic Places
- U.S. Historic district – Contributing property
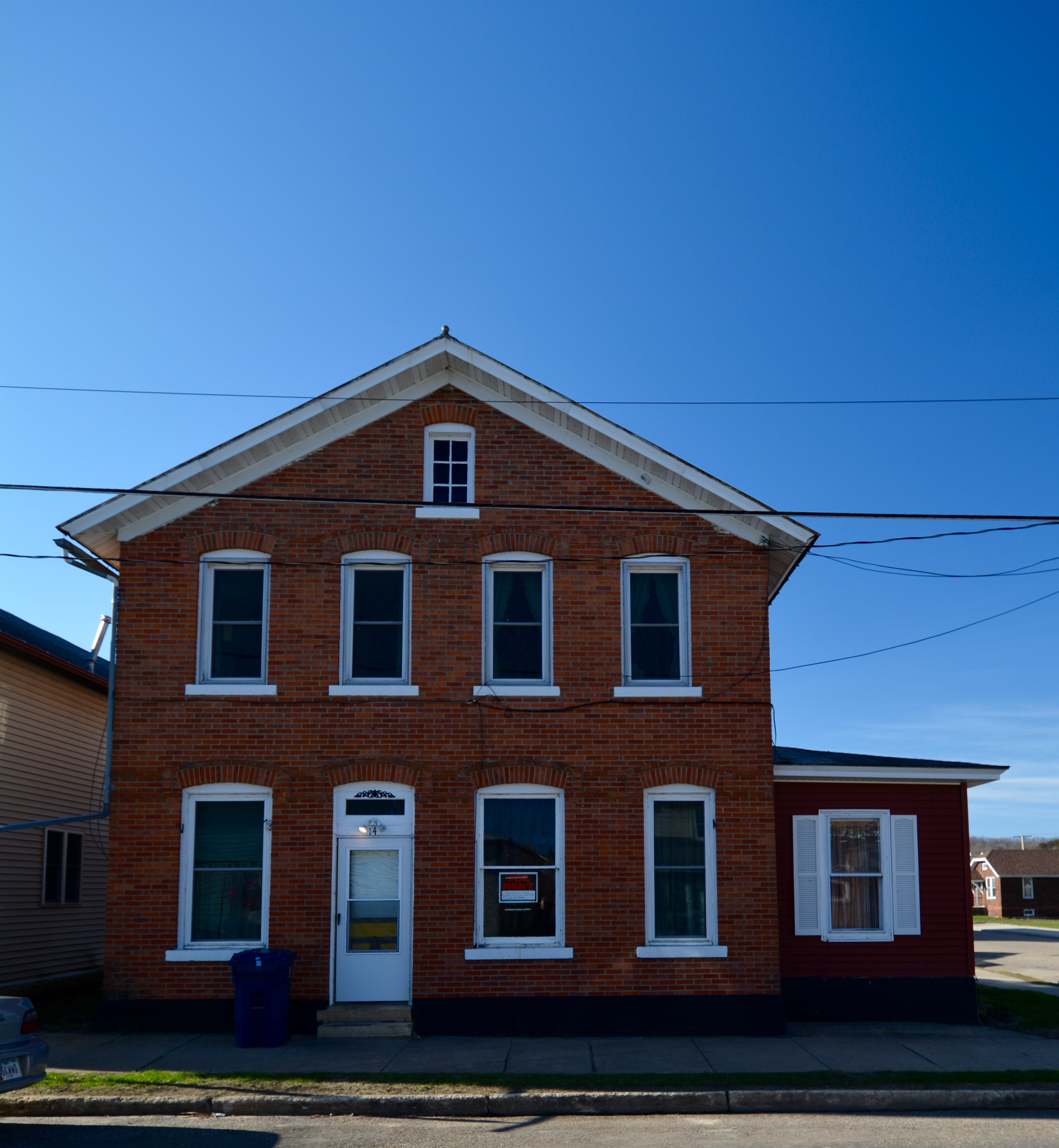

- Location within Iowa Location within the United States
- Location: 503 S. 1st St. Guttenberg, Iowa
- Coordinates: 42°46′53.5″N 91°05′46″W
- Area: less than one acre
- Built: 1870
- Part of: Front Street (River Park Drive) Historic District (ID04001009)
- MPS: Guttenberg MRA
- NRHP reference No.: 84001223
- Added to NRHP: September 24, 1984

The Fuerste House is a historic building located in Guttenberg, Iowa, United States. The two-story brick structure was built about 1870 in the vernacular Greek Revival style. The screened-in porch on the west side was enclosed at some point. Mrs. L. Fuerst operated a millinery shop on the first floor of the family residence by at least 1891. The Fuerst family operated a machine shop across the street. The building was individually listed on the National Register of Historic Places in 1984. In 2004 it was included as a contributing property in the Front Street (River Park Drive) Historic District.
