= Alfred A. McKethan =

American banker

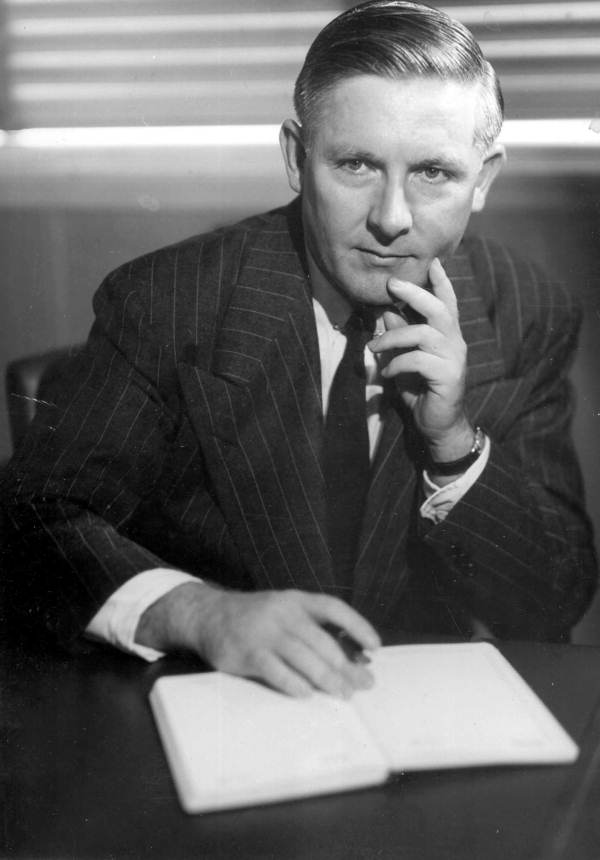
- Born: October 14, 1908; Brooksville, Florida, U.S.
- Died: April 1, 2002 (aged 93); Brooksville, Florida, U.S.
- Education: B.S., University of Florida, 1931
- Known for: Chairman, Hernando State Bank; Chairman, State Road Board
- Spouse: Ruth Arlene Crane (divorced)

Alfred Augustus McKethan (October 14, 1908 – April 1, 2002) was a prominent American banker, citrus grower, businessman and political appointee who was a native and resident of Florida.

== Early life and education ==
McKethan was born in Brooksville, Florida, October 14, 1908. He was a fifth-generation Floridian. After graduating from Hernando High School in 1926, McKethan attended the Virginia Military Institute in Lexington, Virginia for two years, and completed his education at the University of Florida in Gainesville, Florida, where he was a member of Sigma Nu fraternity] (Epsilon Zeta chapter). He graduated with honors from Florida with a bachelor's degree in business administration in 1931.

== Banking and business career ==
McKethan was the former president and chairman of Hernando State Bank, which became Sun Bank and Trust Company, and, in turn, SunTrust Bank. He started work at Hernando State Bank after graduating from the University of Florida in 1931. His first job was that of an assistant cashier, and he later became head cashier, vice president, and then the bank's president in 1940. At the age of 38, McKethan became the youngest president of the Florida Bankers Association. He served as president and chief executive officer of the Sun Bank and Trust Company until 1994, at which time he retired.

Together with his brother, John W. McKethan, he established the Brooksville Rock Company, which later became known as the Florida Mining and Materials Corporation. McKethan was also a citrus grower, serving as the director and then chairman of the Brooksville Citrus Growers Association for forty years, and as Director of the Florida Citrus Exchange for fifteen years. McKethan served as the president of Florida Citrus Mutual.

== Political appointments ==
Florida Governor Fuller Warren appointed McKethan to be the chairman of the State Road Board; he served from 1949 to 1953. McKethan was responsible, in part, for the construction of the Sunshine Skyway Bridge across Tampa Bay, as well as for the initial planning of the Florida Turnpike. He also served as the first chairman of the Southwest Florida Water Management District.

== Philanthropy and retirement ==
In 1988, Alfred McKethan donated the equivalent of $800,000 to his alma mater, the University of Florida, for the construction of a new baseball stadium known as the Alfred A. McKethan Stadium at Perry Field. Later that year, he was inducted into the University of Florida Athletic Hall of Fame as an "honorary letter winner. McKethan Stadium was demolished in 2020, but the playing surface at its replacement was dedicated "Alfred A. McKethan Field" in his honor.

McKethan wrote a history of Hernando County, Florida, entitled Hernando County: Our Story, in 1989.

The Hernando County Park on Pine Island, Alfred McKethan Park, was named for him.

McKethan died in 2002; he was 93 years old.

== See also ==
- Florida Gators baseball
- History of Florida
- History of the University of Florida
- List of Sigma Nu brothers
- List of University of Florida alumni
- List of University of Florida Athletic Hall of Fame members
- List of University of Florida honorary degree recipients

== Bibliography ==
- McKethan, Alfred A., Hernando County: Our Story, Brooksville, Florida (1989).
