= Guttenberg National Fish Hatchery and Aquarium Historic District =

Historic district in Iowa, United States

- U.S. National Register of Historic Places
- U.S. Historic district
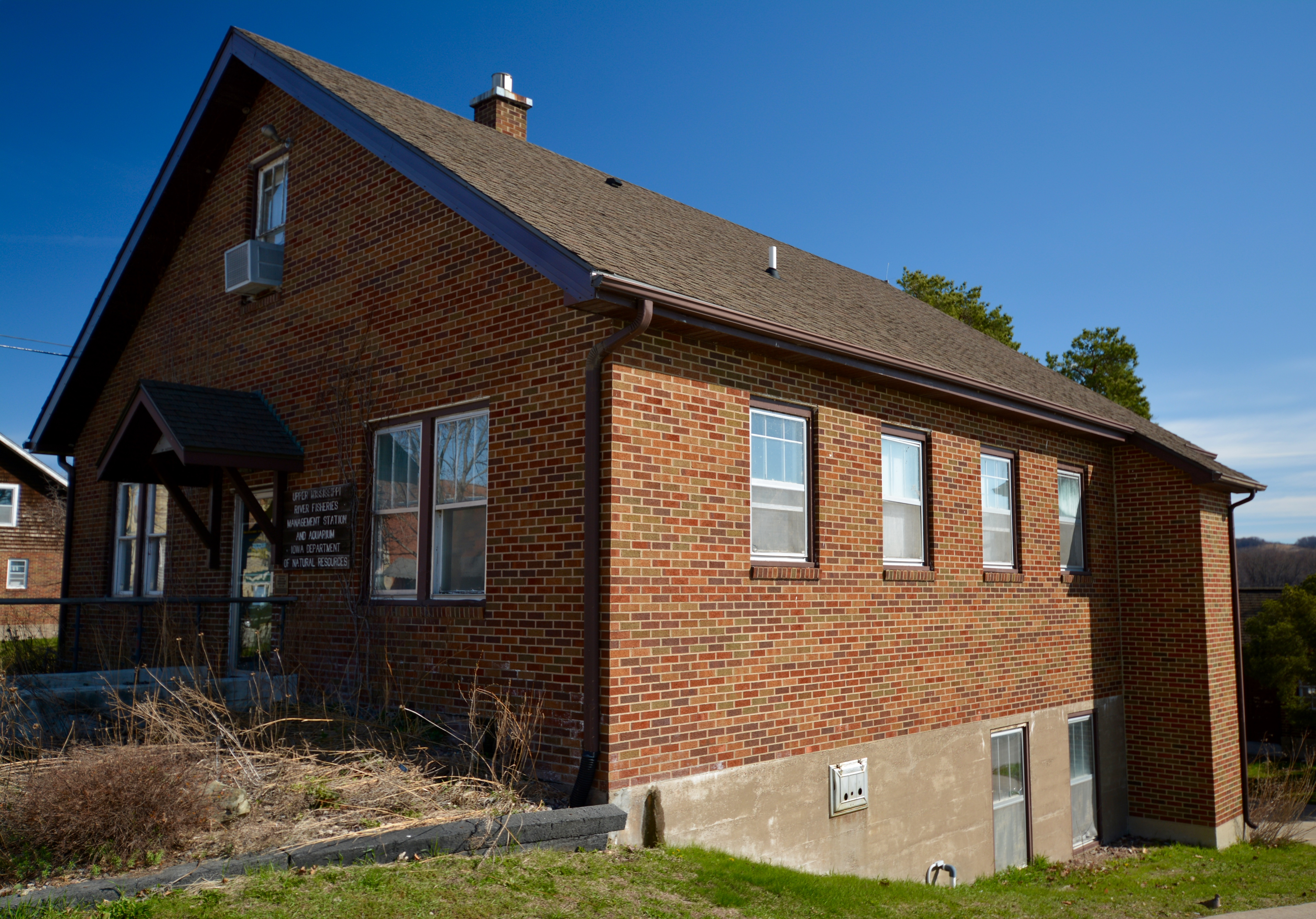
- The hatchery and aquarium building

- Location within Iowa Location within the United States
- Location: 315 S. River Park Dr. Guttenberg, Iowa
- Coordinates: 42°46′59.3″N 91°05′43.7″W
- Area: 2.5 acres (1.0 ha)
- Built: 1938-1940
- MPS: Conservation Movement in Iowa MPS
- NRHP reference No.: 91001833
- Added to NRHP: December 23, 1991

The Guttenberg National Fish Hatchery and Aquarium Historic District is a nationally recognized historic district located in Guttenberg, Iowa, United States. It was operated by the Iowa Department of Natural Resources and listed on the National Register of Historic Places in 1991. At the time of its nomination the district consisted of four resources, all of which are contributing buildings. This district also contributes to the Front Street (River Park Drive) Historic District. The U.S. Fish and Wildlife Service had a long history of involvement with wildlife conservation in Iowa, especially fisheries. They established fish rescue program along the Mississippi River in 1903 and a research station at Fairport in 1910. The development of the lock and dam system in the 1930s brought the fish rescue operations to an end because they eliminated of the backwaters that trapped them. The fish hatchery was developed at that time.

Property for the facility was donated by the City of Guttenberg and the United States Army Corps of Engineers. Construction of the hatchery and aquarium building, the superintendent's residence, and a garage were begun in 1938 and completed in 1939 by the Public Works Administration. The pump house was completed a year later. The fish rearing ponds on Twelve Mile Island were built by the Works Progress Administration from 1939 to 1941. The fish reared in the ponds were distributed to lakes, rivers, and ponds in Iowa, Minnesota, Wisconsin, Illinois, Nebraska, and South Dakota. They also supplied specimen fish to the Shedd Aquarium in Chicago; the National Aquarium in Washington, D.C.; aquariums in Dallas, Cleveland, Pittsburgh, and Philadelphia; the Fish Control Laboratory in La Crosse, Wisconsin; as well as several university research laboratories. The ponds were closed and transferred to the Upper Mississippi River National Wildlife and Fish Refuge in 1971. The rest of the facility was transferred to the State of Iowa in 1974, and it acquired the titles to the properties from the federal government in 1986.
