= Front Street (River Park Drive) Historic District =

Historic district in Iowa, United States

- Front Street (River Park Drive); Historic District
- U.S. National Register of Historic Places
- U.S. Historic district
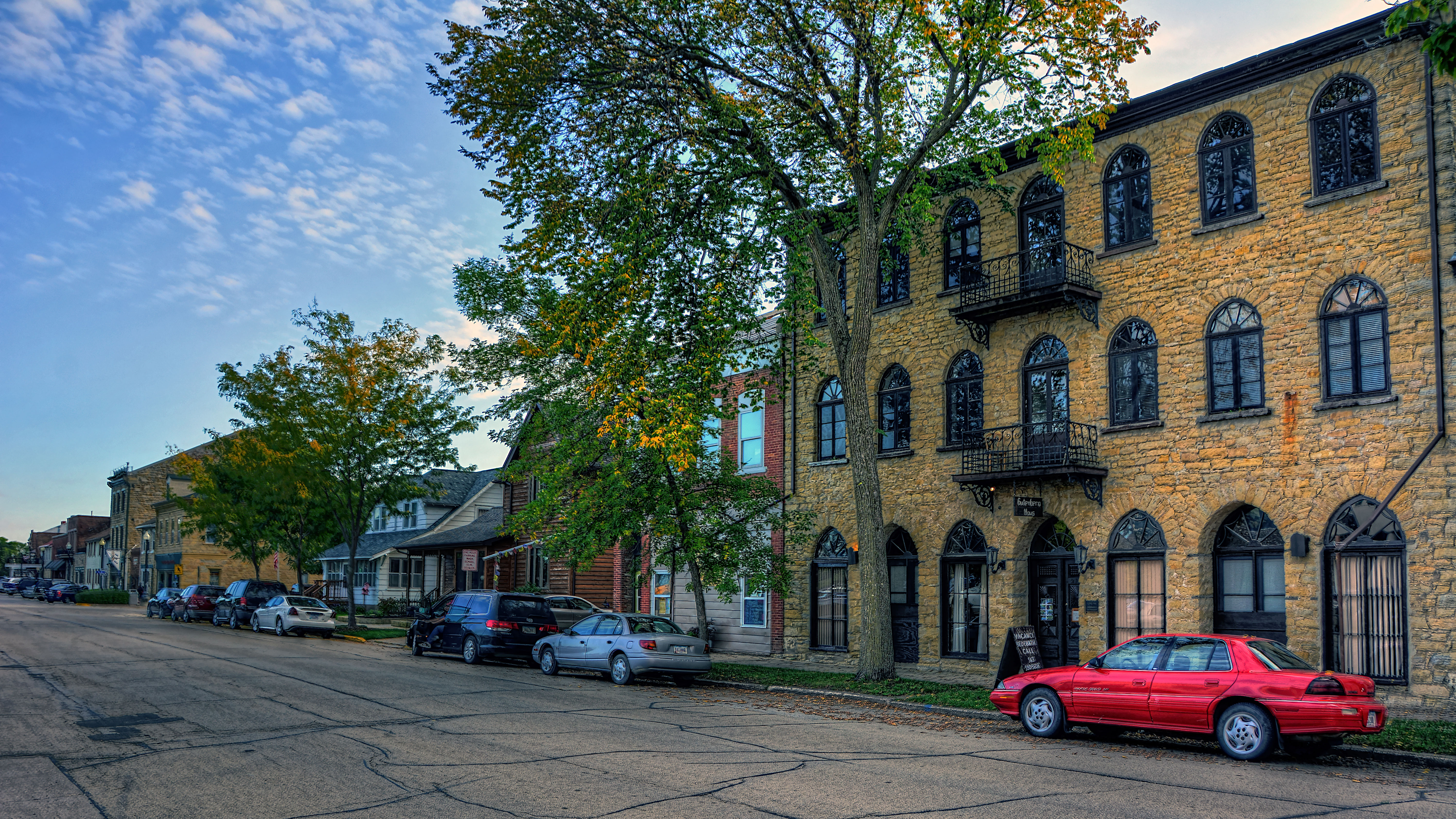

- Location within Iowa Location within the United States
- Location: River Park Dr. between Lessing and Pearl Sts.; also S. 1st, Prince, Goethe, Herder, and Schiller Sts., Guttenberg, Iowa
- Coordinates: 42°46′56″N 91°05′44″W
- Area: 12.5 acres (5.1 ha)
- Architectural style: Late Victorian; Beaux Arts
- MPS: Guttenberg, Iowa MPS
- NRHP reference No.: 84001222 (original); 04001009 (increase)

Significant dates
- Added to NRHP: September 24, 1984
- Boundary increase: December 10, 2004

The Front Street (River Park Drive) Historic District is a nationally recognized historic district located in Guttenberg, Iowa, United States. It was listed on the National Register of Historic Places in 1984, and in 2004 its boundaries increased to include buildings that did not front onto River Park Drive. At the time of its nomination the district consisted of 75 resources, including 57 contributing buildings, one contributing site, and 17 noncontributing buildings. The boundary increase added 19 resources, including 15 contributing buildings, one contributing site, and 3 noncontributing buildings. The 4½ block segment of South River Park Drive, originally called Front Street, that makes up the district is the commercial center of Guttenberg. The buildings line the west side of the street facing a park, a contributing site, and the Mississippi River across the street. The National Fish Hatchery and Aquarium complex (1939-1940), whose buildings contribute to the historic nature of the district, is also located on the east side of the street.

There is a large collection of brick and native limestone buildings in the district. They range in height from one to three stories. The oldest buildings date from the early 1850s with a majority of the buildings overall built before 1900. There is a number of buildings constructed in vernacular forms, and many are capped with either side or front gable roofs. The parapet front commercial type is also prominent. Besides the fish hatchery, the other contributing buildings that are also individually listed on the National Register include the Albertus Building (1855), the Fuerste House (1870), and the Guttenberg State Bank (1902).
