= The Elgin State Bank =

Elgin State Bank
- Industry: Banking
- Founded: 1964; 62 years ago
- Defunct: September 30, 2011; 14 years ago
- Fate: Acquired by Wintrust Financial
- Headquarters: Elgin, Illinois
- Number of locations: 3 branches
- Area served: Elgin, Illinois
- Key people: Mark R. Abate, CEO
- Total assets: ▲$0.277 billion (2011)

Elgin State Bank was a bank headquartered in Elgin, Illinois. In 2011, the bank was acquired by Wintrust Financial for $13.75 million in cash and stock and its branches were re-branded as St. Charles Bank & Trust Company.

The bank had 3 branches, all of which were in Elgin, Illinois.

== History ==
The bank was founded in 1964.

On September 9, 2010, the Federal Deposit Insurance Corporation issued an order against the bank, citing "unsafe or unsound banking practices".

In 2011, the bank was acquired by Wintrust Financial for $13.75 million in cash and stock and its branches were re-branded as St. Charles Bank & Trust Company.
