= Texas State Bank =

American bank, 1926–2019

- Founded: August 17, 1926; 99 years ago
- Defunct: 2019; 7 years ago
- Fate: Merged with American State Bank
- Successor: American State Bank
- Headquarters: Joaquin, Texas
- Website: www.texasstatebank.net

Texas State Bank, based in Joaquin, was a commercial bank founded on August 17, 1926. Ownership remained with individual shareholders until 1983, when Joaquin Bancshares, Inc., purchased controlling interest. Texas State Bank remained an independently owned bank with Joaquin Bancshares, Inc. being the sole stockholder until it merged with American State Bank in 2019.

== History ==
Texas State Bank opened its first branch in 1991. The bank operated in Shelby, Angelina, and Tyler Counties.

The bank was purchased by Banco Bilbao Vizcaya Argentaria along with State National Bank for $2.6 billion USD in 2006.

In 2019, the bank merged with American State Bank, with American State Bank being the successor of the merger.
