= Union State Bank, Florence =

The Union State Bank is an American community bank headquartered in Florence, Texas. It was established in 1928 as a merger of three local banks. Since 1972 the majority interest was acquired by the B.M. "Bernie" Beck family. Currently it is family operated, with Beck's family members serving as president, chairman of the board and CEO.

Between 1990 and 1997, four other branches were added, and the offices were established in Florence, Killeen, Georgetown, Liberty Hill, Round Rock, and Harker Heights. The bank received the "Blue Ribbon" award for financial strength in the top 10% of banks in the United States.
