= American State Bank (Berwyn, Illinois) =

- U.S. National Register of Historic Places
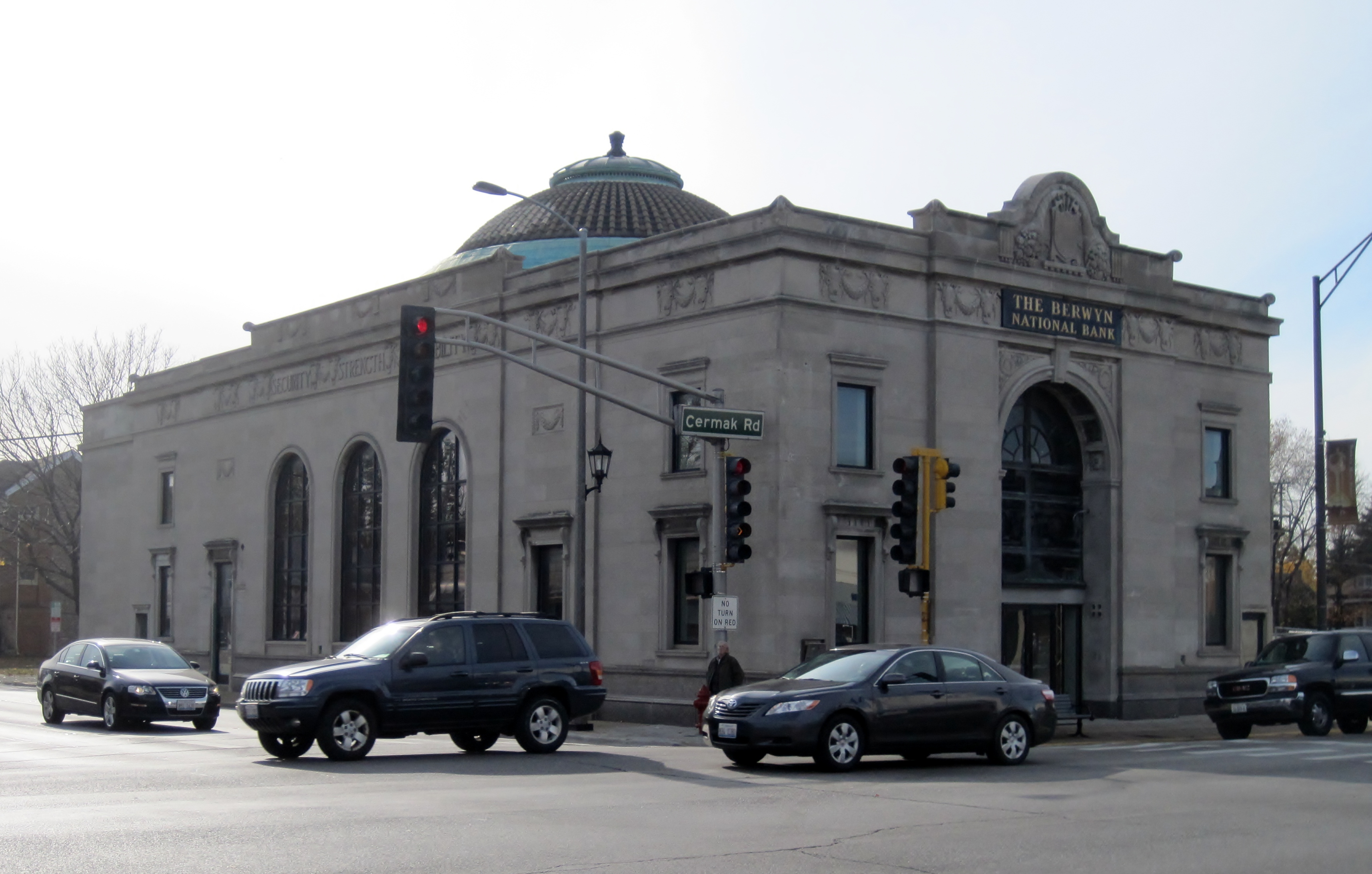

- Location within Illinois Location within the United States
- Location: 6801 Cermak Rd., Berwyn, Illinois
- Coordinates: 41°51′1″N 87°47′37″W
- Area: 0.1 acres (0.040 ha)
- Built: 1925
- Architectural style: Classical Revival
- NRHP reference No.: 00000951
- Added to NRHP: October 5, 2000

The American State Bank, also known as the First American National Bank and the Berwyn National Bank, is a historic bank building in Berwyn, Illinois, United States. It was an important part of the economic development of Berwyn and is associated with its Central European heritage. It was built in 1925 and was placed in receivership in 1932.

== History ==
Berwyn, Illinois was incorporated in 1902 and by 1910, the population exceeded 5,800. By 1930, the population expanded to 47,000. This growth was due to the industrial plants in neighboring Cicero, which brought immigrants from Chicago's west side to the suburbs. Berwyn became a haven for Czechs, who moved from Chicago after being displaced by Polish populations. The Czechs that came were generally of strong socioeconomic status and were skilled craftsmen. Czech-led building and loan associations financed local development. Joseph Cermak and Albert Novotny purchased a large landholding from Biacor Hindman, spurring further growth. New establishments were needed to provide home mortgages to new settlers.

The American State Bank, briefly known as the Twenty-Second Street Bank during its development, was founded by Frank Topinka in October 1925. It was one of five banks operating in Berwyn at the time. More than $5 million was spent on the 20,000 homes, apartments, and stores in Berwyn from 1921 to 1928. The American State Bank financed about $2 million of these loans. Topinka also operated the Oakwyn State Bank in Berwyn and the First State Bank of Fox River Grove. The American State Bank held approximately $1.9 million in assets by 1929.

The Wall Street crash of 1929 devastated the American State Bank. In 1930, the American State Bank merged with the Ridgeland State bank, the Oakwyn, and the First National Bank & Trust in an effort to remain solvent. They conducted operations in this building as the First American National Bank & Trust. The bank was placed in receivership in 1932. Every bank in Berwyn went out of business during the ensuring Great Depression; no banks operated in the town until July 1937. Frank Skala then founded the Berwyn National Bank in the former American State Bank building.

On October 5, 2000, the building was recognized by the National Park Service with a listing on the National Register of Historic Places. The building was recognized as a Berwyn Historic Landmark, along with the Berwyn State Bank Building, in 2008.
