= Hernando State Bank =

- Industry: Banking
- Founded: 1905; 121 years ago
- Defunct: 1985; 41 years ago
- Fate: Acquired by Suntrust Banks
- Headquarters: Brooksville, Florida

Hernando State Bank was a bank based in Brooksville, Florida. The bank was located in a historic building. In 1985, the bank was acquired by Suntrust Banks. At that time, the bank had 8 branches.

== History ==
The bank was established in 1905 with $15,000 in capital by a group of people including J.C. Burwell, Merchant J. A. Jennings, Sheriff W. E. Law, Turpentine Operators L.B. Varn, G. W. Varn, and G. C. Varn, Aripeka Saw Mill president M. A. Amorous.

The bank headquarters was built that same year. The first president of the bank was James A. Jennings.

In 1907, William McKethan acquired the bank and became its president. His son, Alfred A. McKethan, later took over as president.

In 1985, the bank was acquired by Sun Bank, later Suntrust Banks.
