= Guttenberg State Bank =

- U.S. National Register of Historic Places
- U.S. Historic district – Contributing property
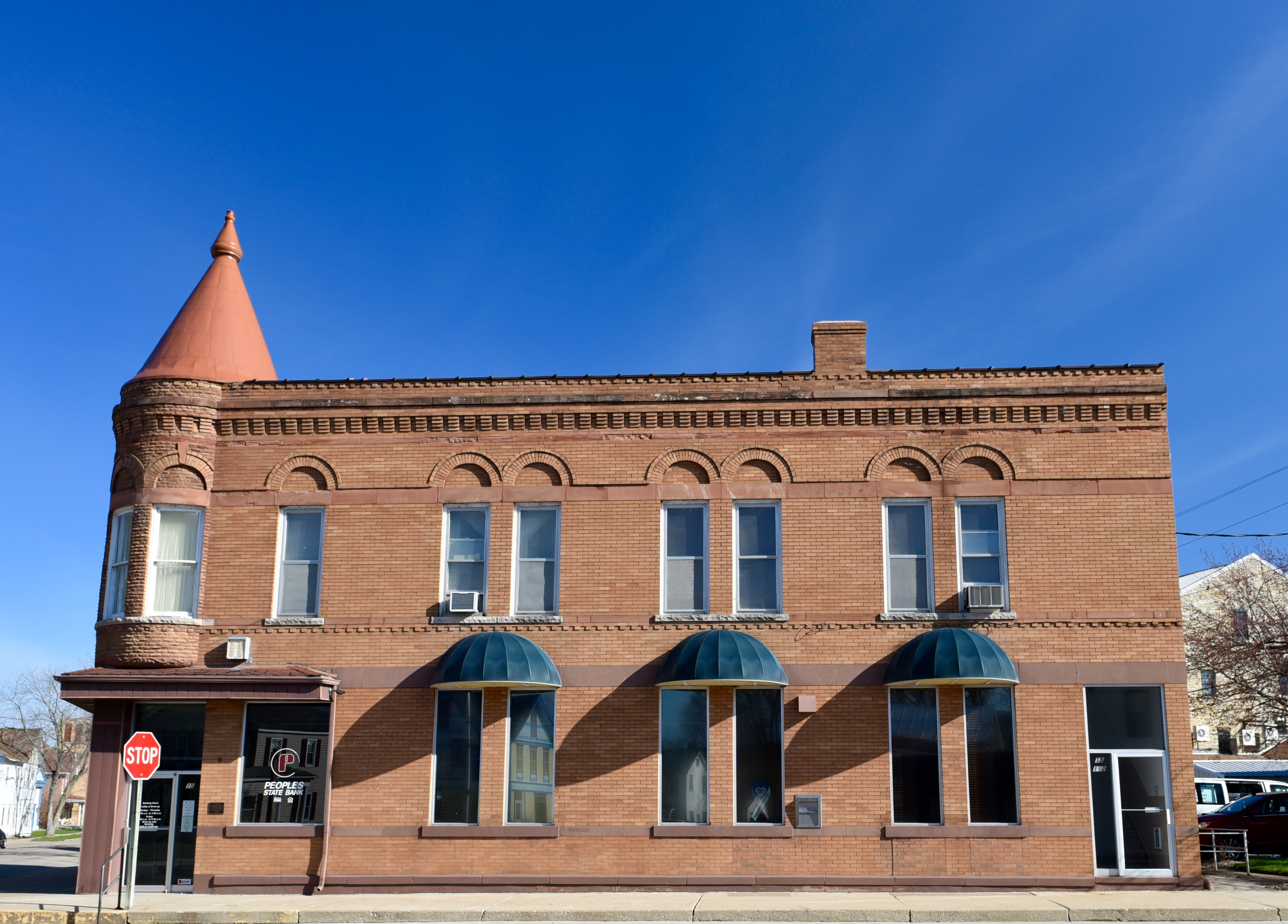

- Location within Iowa Location within the United States
- Location: 15 Goethe St. Guttenberg, Iowa
- Coordinates: 42°46′59″N 91°05′48″W
- Area: less than one acre
- Built: 1902
- Architectural style: Romanesque Revival
- Part of: Front Street (River Park Drive) Historic District (ID84001222)
- MPS: Guttenberg MRA
- NRHP reference No.: 04001009
- Added to NRHP: September 24, 1984

The Guttenberg State Bank, also known as the People's Bank, is a historic building located in Guttenberg, Iowa, United States. The bank was incorporated in May 1900 with John P. Eckart was its president. The bank was also referred to as "Eckart Bank". They built this building two years later. It is a two-story brick structure that features a round tower with a conical roof on the corner. The second floor windows are topped with inlaid brick arches that combines with a brick stringcourse. Above is a brick cornice.

Guttenberg had two banks, the other was Clayton County State Bank, and neither failed during the Great Depression. In 1943 the two banks consolidated, and they continued to do business in this facility. The bank expanded to the north in 1979. The building was individually listed on the National Register of Historic Places in 1984. In 2004 it was included as a contributing property in the Front Street (River Park Drive) Historic District.
