= State Bank of Kamiah =

- U.S. National Register of Historic Places
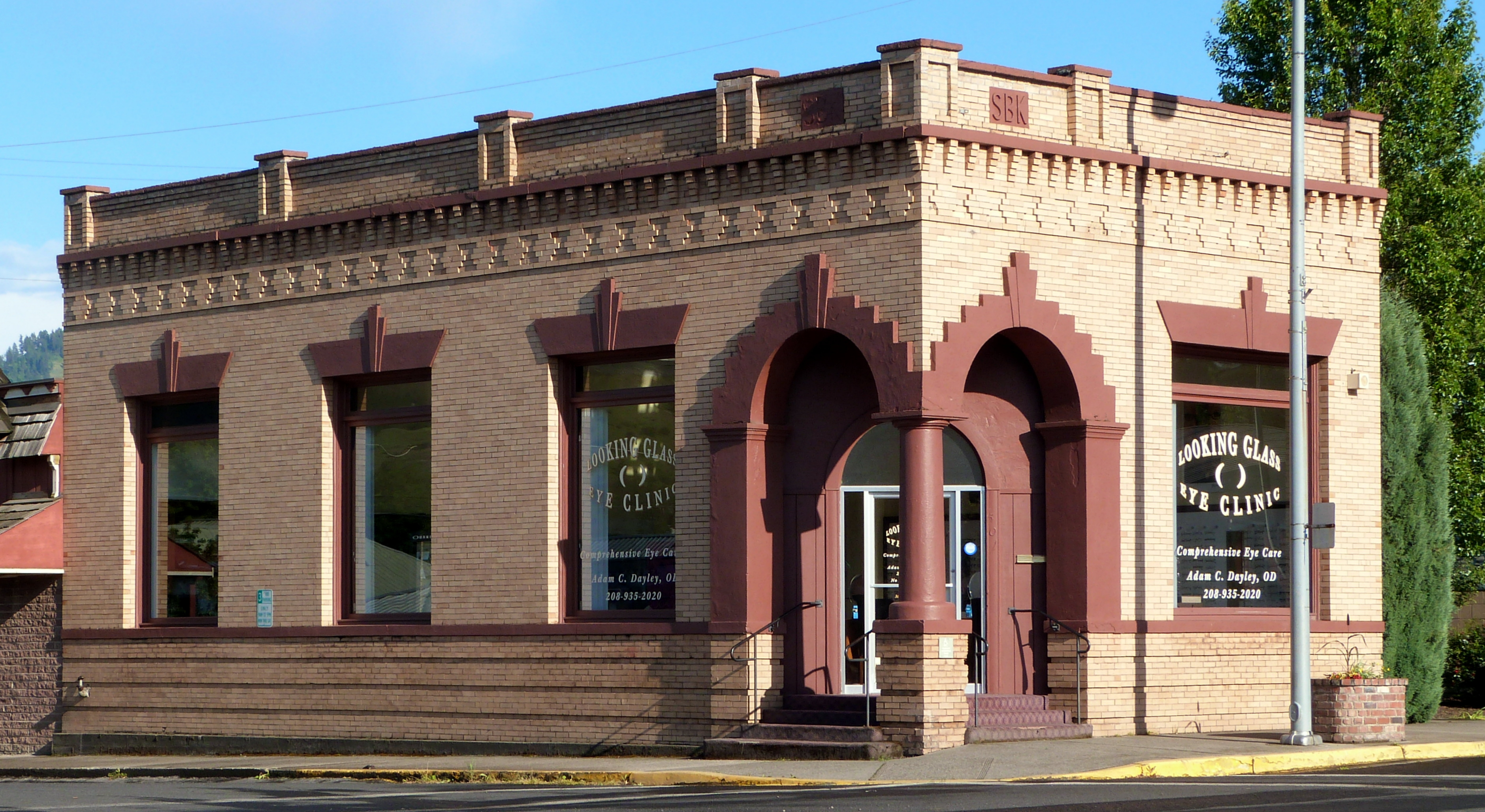
- The State Bank of Kamiah in 2015

- Location within Idaho Location within the United States
- Location: ID 64, Kamiah, Idaho
- Coordinates: 46°13′38″N 116°01′40″W
- Area: less than one acre
- Built: 1919
- Architect: Loring, Ralph
- Architectural style: Chicago, Commercial
- NRHP reference No.: 78001082
- Added to NRHP: August 29, 1978

The State Bank of Kamiah is a building located in Kamiah, Idaho, United States, listed on the National Register of Historic Places.

It was designed by architect Ralph Loring and was built by masons Fred Dole and Jesse Collins.

== See also ==
- List of National Historic Landmarks in Idaho
- National Register of Historic Places listings in Lewis County, Idaho
