= Berwyn State Bank Building =

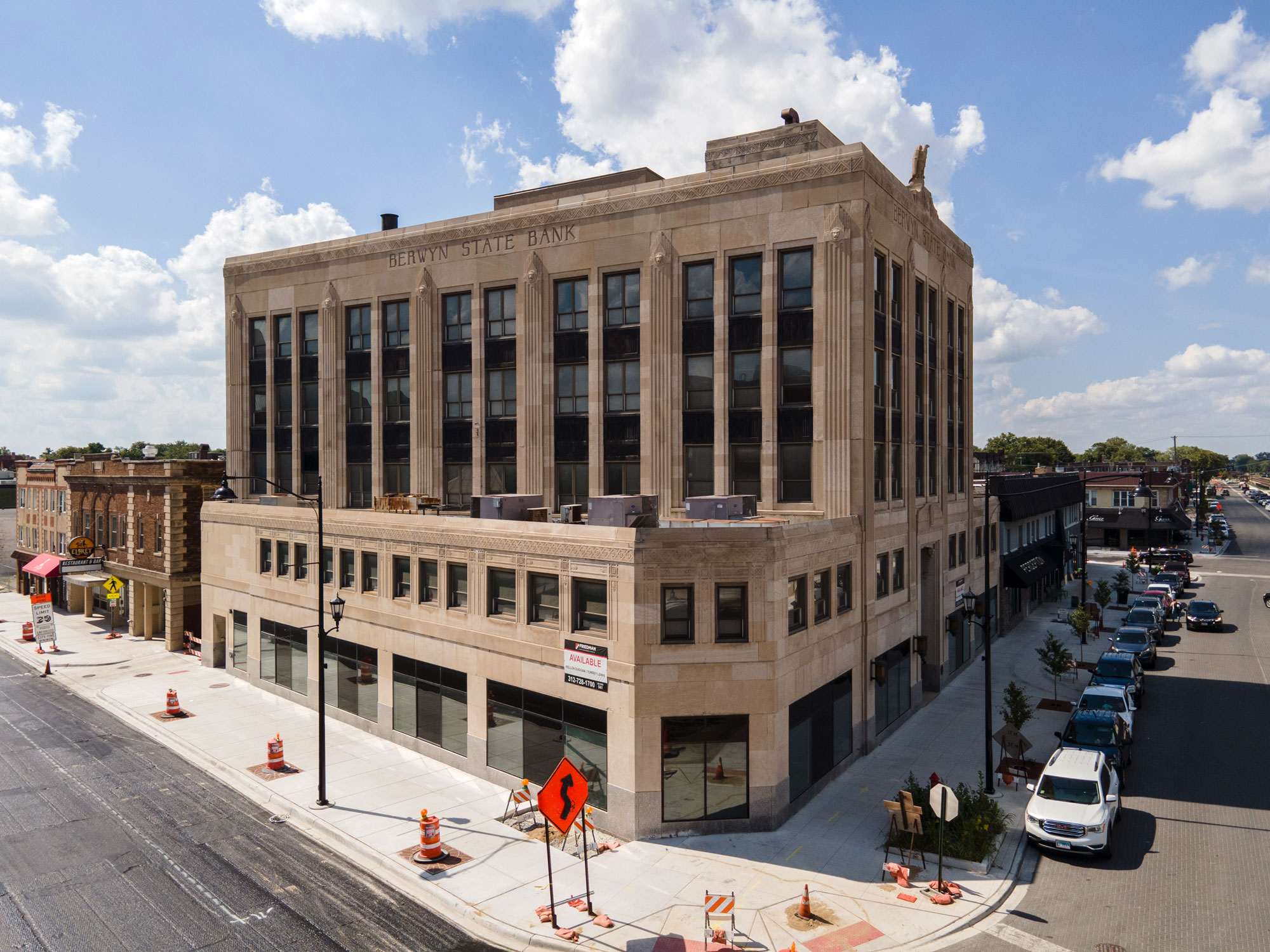

General information
- Architectural style: Art Deco
- Location: 6804 Windsor Avenue, Berwyn, Illinois
- Coordinates: 41°49′58.6″N 87°47′35.1″W
- Completed: 1929
- Opened: June 7, 1930
- Height: 61 feet (19 m)

Technical details
- Floor count: 5
- Floor area: 41,780 sq ft (3,881 m^{2})

Design and construction
- Architect(s): Charles Osborne Liska

The Berwyn State Bank Building is an Art Deco office building at 6804 Windsor Avenue, Berwyn, Illinois. It was designed by Charles O. Liska and was built at a cost of $400,000 in 1929. It is a Berwyn Historic Landmark.

== History ==
The Berwyn State Bank, which was founded in 1909, opened the building on June 7, 1930. It occupied the building’s second floor. For many years, Schoen–McAllister, a dry goods store, was located on the ground floor. Much of the fifth floor was leased to physicians.

The Berwyn State Bank purchased the property where the building stands on November 25, 1914. Title to the building was transferred to the Berwyn State Company on May 27, 1930, and the Oak Park Federal Savings Bank on June 1, 1930. The Berwyn State Bank failed on June 27, 1931. The building was sold to Blackstone Realty in 1947 for $275,000, and the Commercial National Bank was formed and began operating in the building. In the 1960s Metropolitan Life Insurance Company's West Suburban district office was located in the building. In 1970, it was sold to MacNeal Memorial Hospital. In 2003, MacNeal sold the building to HSA Commercial Real Estate. The building was recognized as a Berwyn Historic Landmark, along with the Berwyn National Bank Building, in 2008.
