= Wintrust Financial =

American Financial Holding Company

Wintrust Financial Corporation
- Type: Public
- Traded as: Nasdaq: WTFC; S&P 400 component
- Industry: Financial services
- Founded: 1991; Lake Forest, Illinois
- Founder: Ed Wehmer
- Headquarters: Rosemont, Illinois
- Key people: Tim Crane, CEO & President; David Dykstra, Vice Chairman & COO
- Products: Consumer Banking, Corporate Banking, Insurance, Investment Banking, Mortgage loans, Private Banking, Private Equity, Wealth Management, Credit Cards, Financial Analysis
- Revenue: ▲$ 2.16 billion (fiscal year ended 31 December 2023)
- Net income: ▲$622.63 million (fiscal year ended 31 December 2023)
- Total assets: ▲$ 56.26 billion (fiscal year ended 31 December 2023)
- Number of employees: 5,521 FTE (fiscal year ended 31 December 2023)
- Rating: BBB+ | Fitch (as of 31 December 2023)
- Website: wintrust.com

Wintrust is a financial holding company in the United States that operates 15 chartered community banks in northern Illinois and southern Wisconsin. Wintrust is usually classified as a medium-sized banking institution in the United States and it trades on the Nasdaq Global Select Market with stock symbol WTFC. Wintrust is the second largest banking company in Chicago.

== Services ==
The company provides traditional retail and commercial banking services, as well as wealth management services, commercial and life insurance premium financing, and certain treasury management services such as data processing of payrolls and billings. In 2015 Wintrust began to expand into equipment financing, both directly through its bank branches and indirectly through dealers.

== History ==
Wintrust was founded by Ed Wehmer. Wintrust was among the recipients of capital from the United States government through the U.S. Treasury's Troubled Asset Relief Program. The bank used the 2008 financial crisis to acquire small troubled banks in the Chicago area, backed by its pre-crisis capital supplemented by TARP funds. This positioned it to become one of the area's largest retail banks by eliminating costs and deepening its geographical footprint in the area. Wintrust Financial continues to expand within its footprint area.

In 2018, Wintrust completed its acquisition of Veterans First Mortgage, a Utah-based corporation with approximately 400 employees.

In May 2019, Wintrust acquired Rush-Oak Corporation, the parent company of Oak Bank, an Illinois state-chartered bank which had approximately $201 million in assets. In October 2019, Wintrust acquired STC Bancshares Corp, the parent company of STC Capital Bank, an Illinois state-chartered bank with approximately $275 million in assets.

In 2021, the Hinsdale Bank, a Wintrust Bank, opened the Oak Park Bank in what had been a restaurant space in a historic building. The Oak Park Bank built a second location, new facility, in the village.

In 2022, Wintrust announced a deal to acquire the U.S. asset management arm of Rothschild & Co, which held around $8 billion in assets under management at the time.

On August 1, 2024, it was announced that Wintrust had completed the merger of its operations with Macatawa Bank Corporation, a company based in Holland, Michigan.

== Community banks ==
Unlike most major U.S. banks, Wintrust's business strategy is to retain the identities of the community banks it acquires rather than rebranding them. However, each community bank uses the tagline, "A Wintrust Community Bank." Wintrust's 15 chartered bank subsidiaries and their respective community banks are:

- Barrington Bank & Trust Company, N.A. (Hanover Park Community Bank, Hoffman Estates Community Bank, and Palatine Bank & Trust)
- Beverly Bank & Trust Company, N.A. (Brighton Park Community Bank, First National Bank of Evergreen Park, Hyde Park Bank, Oak Lawn Bank & Trust, and Pullman Bank & Trust)
- Crystal Lake Bank & Trust Company, N.A. (Algonquin Bank & Trust, Cary Bank & Trust, McHenry Bank & Trust)
- Hinsdale Bank & Trust Company, N.A. (Clarendon Hills Bank, Community Bank of Downers Grove, The Community Bank of Western Springs, Community Bank of Willowbrook, Lemont Bank & Trust, Oak Park Bank, Proviso Community Bank, Riverside Bank, and Suburban Bank & Trust)
- Lake Forest Bank & Trust Company, N.A. (Bank of Highwood-Fort Sheridan, Highland Park Bank & Trust, North Chicago Community Bank, Waukegan Community Bank, and Wintrust Banking Center)
- Libertyville Bank & Trust Company, N.A. (Gurnee Community Bank, Mundelein Community Bank, Vernon Hills Bank & Trust, and Wauconda Community Bank)
- Northbrook Bank & Trust Company, N.A.(Buffalo Grove Bank & Trust, Deerfield Bank & Trust, Des Plaines Bank & Trust, Glenview Bank & Trust, and Northview Bank & Trust)
- Old Plank Trail Community Bank, N.A. (New Lenox) (Dyer Bank & Trust, First National Bank of Illinois, Joliet Bank & Trust, Markham Bank & Trust, Orland Park Bank & Trust, Shorewood Bank & Trust, South Holland Bank & Trust)
- St. Charles Bank & Trust Company, N.A. (Aurora Bank & Trust, Elgin State Bank, and Geneva Bank & Trust)
- Schaumburg Bank & Trust Company, N.A. (Addison Bank & Trust, Bloomingdale Bank & Trust, Elk Grove Village Bank & Trust, Roselle Bank & Trust, and Wood Dale Bank & Trust)
- State Bank of the Lakes, N.A.
- Town Bank, N.A.
- Village Bank & Trust, N.A.
- Wheaton Bank & Trust Company, N.A. (Bolingbrook Bank & Trust, Glen Ellyn Bank & Trust and Naperville Bank & Trust)
- Wintrust Bank, N.A. (Evanston Community Bank & Trust and North Shore Community Bank & Trust

== Subsidiaries ==
Its major non-bank subsidiaries are:

- Great Lakes Advisors, LLC
- The Chicago Trust Company
- First Insurance Funding
- Tricom, Inc.
- Wintrust Investments, LLC
- Wintrust Information Technology Services Company
- Wintrust Mortgage – a division of Barrington Bank & Trust Company N.A.

== Marketing ==
Wintrust is the official banking partner of the Chicago Cubs, which features sponsorship of the left-field Daktronics ProStar video board at Wrigley Field; the "W" in "Wintrust" flashes after every Cubs win, and is lit after wins, as part of the traditional win flag.

Wintrust has also partnered with the Chicago White Sox for the naming rights to club seats at Rate Field.
