= Old State Bank (Vincennes, Indiana) =

Historic bank building in Indiana, United States

- U.S. National Register of Historic Places
- U.S. Historic district – Contributing property
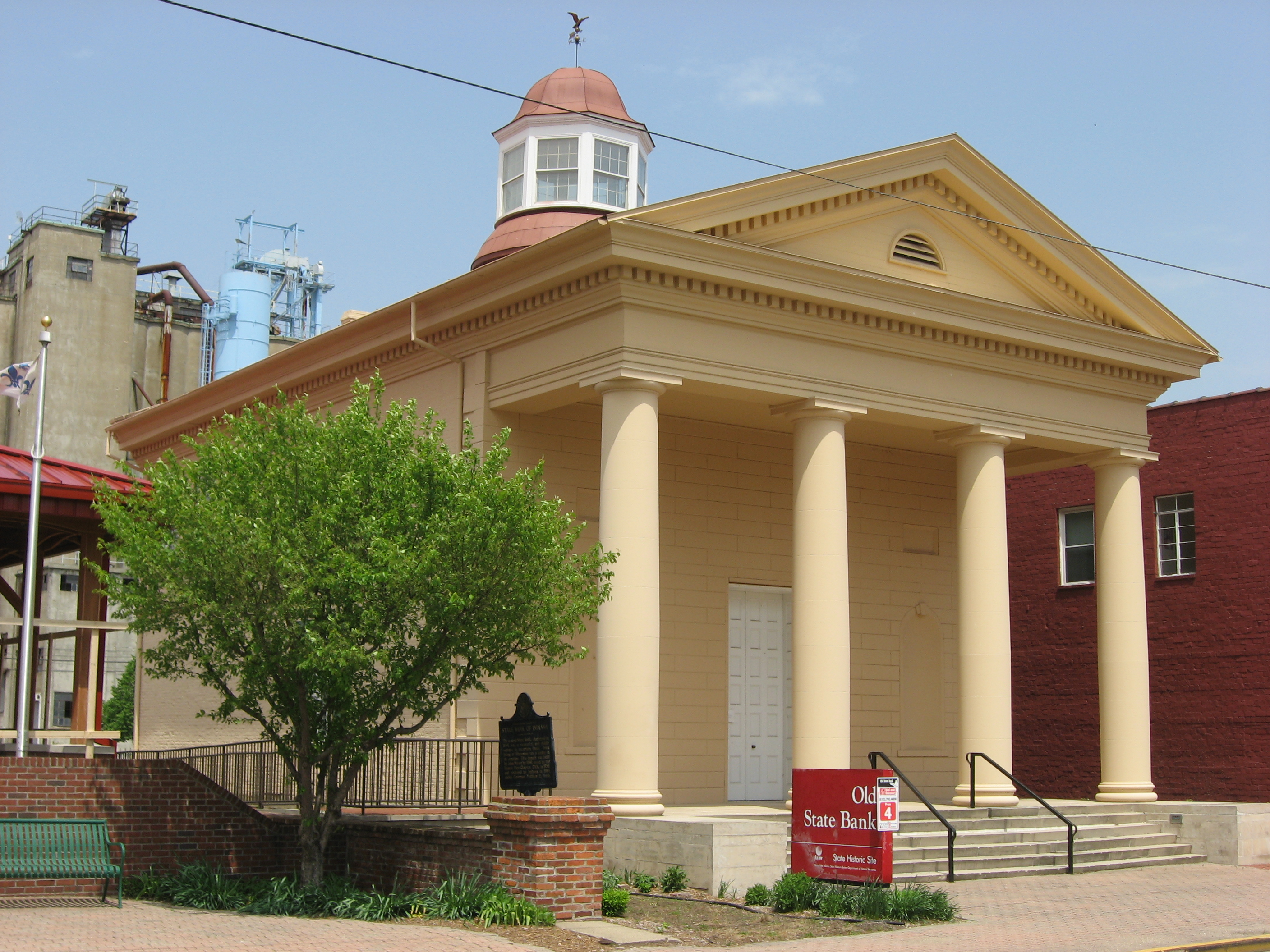
- Old State Bank, April 2011

- Location within Indiana Location within the United States
- Location: N. 2nd St., Vincennes, Indiana
- Coordinates: 38°40′51″N 87°31′52″W
- Area: less than one acre
- Built: 1838
- Architect: Moore, John
- Architectural style: Greek Revival
- NRHP reference No.: 74000021
- Added to NRHP: October 9, 1974

The Old State Bank, also known as the Second State Bank, Vincennes Branch, is a historic bank building located at Vincennes, Indiana. It was built in 1838, and is a 2 1/2-story, Greek Revival style brick building. The building measures 36 feet wide and 48 feet deep. The projecting temple form front facade features four two-story, Doric order columns. The building is topped by a dome with cupola and windows that provide light to the main banking room. The building was restored in 1965.

It was added to the National Register of Historic Places in 1974. It is located in the Vincennes Historic District.
