= Union State Bank, Wisconsin =

The Union State Bank headquartered in Kewaunee, Wisconsin, United States, traces its history since 1910, when the Farmers and Merchants State Bank was established in Kewaunee. The Union State Bank was established in 1934 after the merger of the Farmers and Merchants with the Dairyman's State Bank. In 1987 the Green Bay, Wisconsin office was added and in 2004 the Two Rivers, Wisconsin office was added.

In 2015, Baylake Corp agreed to buy NEW Bancshares, the parent company of Union State Bank, for $9.7 million.
