= Old Bunnell State Bank Building =

- U.S. National Register of Historic Places
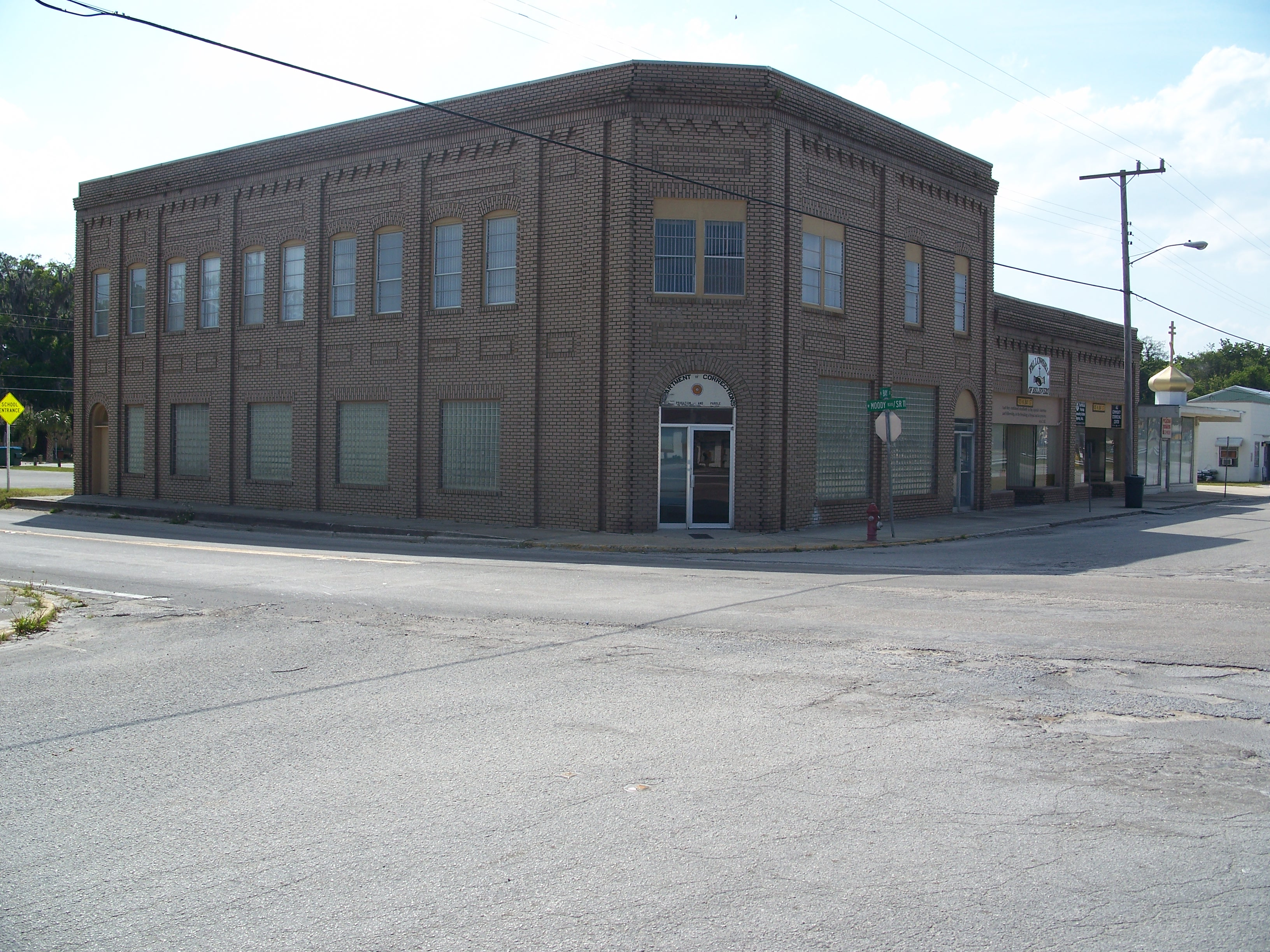

- Location within Florida Location within the United States
- Location: Bunnell, Florida
- Coordinates: 29°27′53″N 81°15′32″W
- NRHP reference No.: 92000824
- Added to NRHP: June 25, 1992

The Old Bunnell State Bank Building (also known as the Citizens Bank of Bunnell) is a historic site in Bunnell, Florida, located between 101 through 107 North Bay Street. On June 25, 1992, it was added to the U.S. National Register of Historic Places.

The Bunnell State Bank was incorporated in 1910 and moved into this building in 1917. The two-story structure is built in the Masonry Vernacular style, with decorative brickwork on the north side. The interior is paneled with wood. This was the only bank in Flagler County from 1917 until 1932, and again from 1938 to 1942.
