= State Bank of Kooskia =

- U.S. National Register of Historic Places
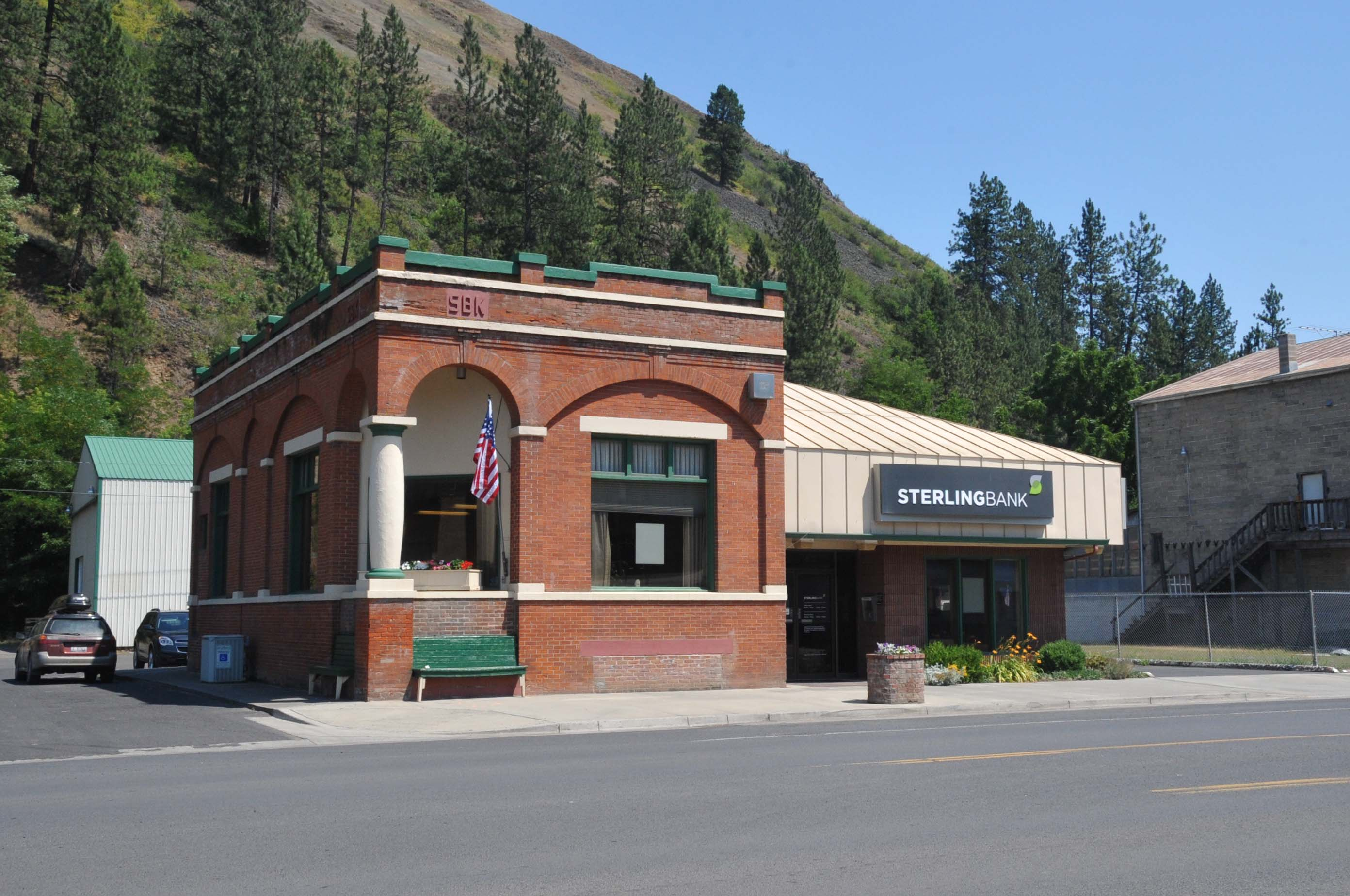

- Location within Idaho Location within the United States
- Location: 1 S. Main St., Kooskia, Idaho
- Coordinates: 46°8′24″N 115°58′40″W
- Area: less than one acre
- Built: 1912
- Built by: Trenary, George
- Architect: Loring, Ralph
- NRHP reference No.: 78001067
- Added to NRHP: May 22, 1978

The State Bank of Kooskia in Kooskia, Idaho was built in 1912. It was listed on the National Register of Historic Places in 1978.

It is a one-story 50 by 25 feet (15.2 m × 7.6 m) brick building with a later one-story brick addition at the rear which makes the building L-shaped. It has brick pilasters and terra cotta band molding. It has a brick parapet with stone capstones.

Its NRHP nomination asserts:

The State Bank of Kooskia is architecturally significant as a good example of a rural community's bank building. Its compact and concise design has charm and its brickwork exhibits good craftsmanship. It is also significant as a local landmark, being Kooskia's oldest brick building and one of the few substantial structures of its period remaining in the town.

It was designed by Lewiston architect Ralph Loring, who also designed other banks in nearby small towns. It was built by Kooskia contractor George Trenary.
