= American State Bank =

- Company type: Private
- Industry: Finance
- Founded: 1948
- Headquarters: Lubbock, Texas
- Key people: W. R. Collier (Chairman), Mike Marshall (President)
- Products: Financial services

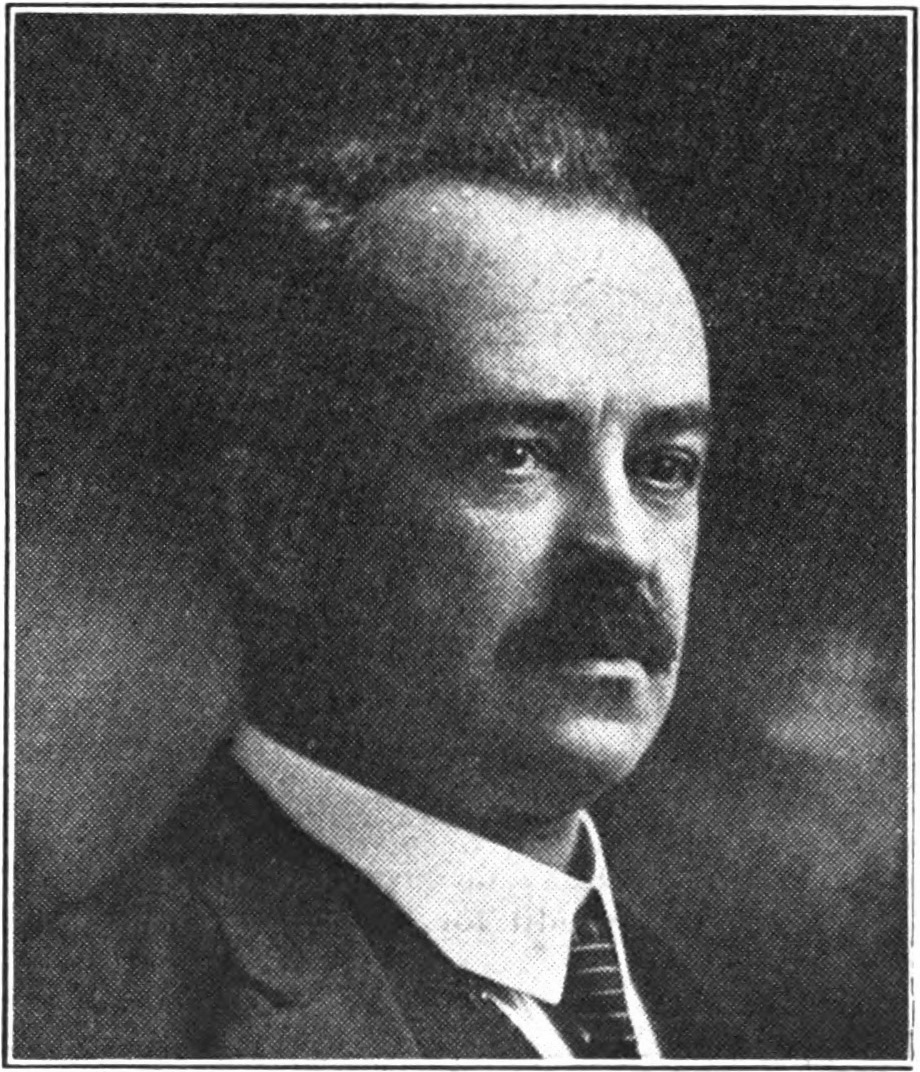
James F. Štěpina, president of the bank before 1923

American State Bank was a financial service company operating 37 locations in 21 communities across Texas, mainly in West Texas.

American State Bank first opened on May 20, 1948, in Lubbock. American State Bank had unusual continuity of management - there were only three presidents since its inception. The first president, Jack Payne, had a term lasting from the banks first opening until 1974.

American State Bank did not accept any bailout funds from the federal government.

On February 27, 2012, Houston-based Prosperity Bancshares, the parent company of Prosperity Bank, announced that it had signed a merger agreement with ASB, whereby ASB will merge into Prosperity Bank subject to shareholder and regulatory approval. The merger became final effective July 1, 2012. Prosperity Bancshares ultimately paid over 500 million dollars, through a combination of cash and common stock, to acquire American State Bank.
