= Union State Bank, Alabama =

The Union State Bank, headquartered in Pell City, Alabama, United States, was established in 1903. In 2010, the bank had 15 offices in Alabama and Florida.
