= Community bank =

Depository institution which is owned and operated locally

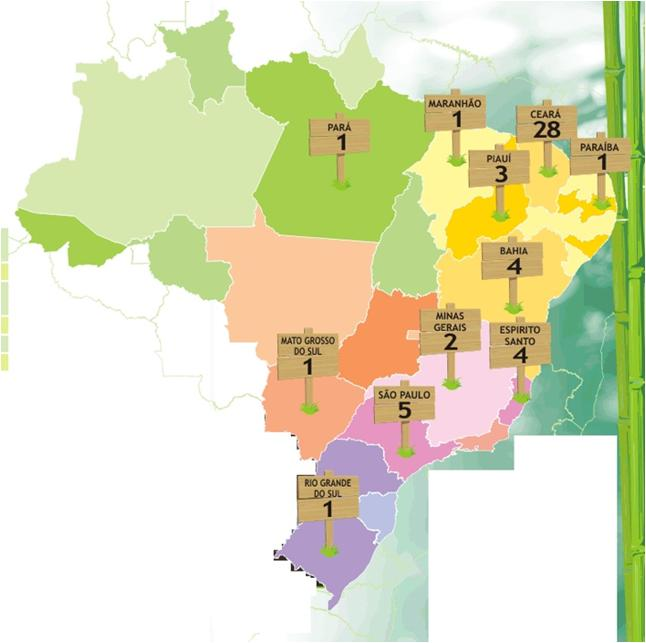
Network of community banks in Brazil as of 2010

A community bank is a depository institution that is typically locally owned and operated. Community banks tend to focus on the needs of the businesses and families where the bank holds branches and offices. Lending decisions are made by people who understand the local needs of families, businesses, and farmers. Employees often reside within the communities they serve.

In the United States, community banks are not clearly defined. Most U.S. agencies base this term on aggregate assets size with varying definitions such as less than $1 billion (Office of the Comptroller of the Currency) up to less than $10 billion (Federal Reserve Board and Government Accountability Office). Beyond size (as measured by assets), the Federal Deposit Insurance Corporation (FDIC) imposes a number of additional requirements on institutions classified as community banks. From 1985 to 2004 community banks comprised roughly 94% of all commercial banks in the United States, but the proportion of total national deposits held by community banks declined from about 25.89% of all U.S. deposits in 1985 to 13.55% of the U.S. deposits in 2003. The decline in community banking prevalence in the United States has drawn the attention of economists and policymakers, some of whom have argued that community banks play an important role in macroeconomic stability.

According to the FDIC, banks it classified as community banks reported $29.9 billion in net income for 2025, up 22.5% from 2024. Their full-year pretax return on assets was 1.32%, up 18 basis points from 2024.

== See also ==
- United States Federal Deposit Insurance Corporation
- Credit unions in the United States
- Mutual savings bank
- Regional bank
- Community development financial institution
