= Farmers State Bank =

Farmers State Bank or Farmers State Bank Building may refer to:

in the United States (by state)

- Farmers State Bank (Conway, Arkansas), listed on the National Register of Historic Places (NRHP)
- Farmers State Bank of Cope, Cope, Colorado, NRHP-listed in Washington County
- Farmers State Bank Building (Fort Morgan, Colorado), listed on the NRHP in Colorado
- Farmers' State Bank (Volga, Iowa), listed on the NRHP in Iowa
- Farmers State Bank (Lindsborg, Kansas), listed on the NRHP in Kansas
- Farmers State Bank (Valparaiso, Indiana), a part of the NRHP-listed Valparaiso Downtown Commercial District
- Farmers State Bank of Chesterfield, listed on the NRHP in Missouri
- Farmers State Bank (Adams, Nebraska), listed on the NRHP in Nebraska
- Farmers State Bank (Loomis, Nebraska), listed on the NRHP in Nebraska
- Farmers State Bank of Platte, listed on the NRHP in South Dakota
- Farmers State Bank (Georgetown, Texas)

== See also ==
- Farmers and Mechanics Savings Bank (disambiguation)
- Farmers and Merchants Bank (disambiguation)
