= Frauenthal =

Frauenthal is a surname of Germanic origin. People with the surname include:

- Max Frauenthal (1836–1914), leading merchant in post-bellum Arkansas
- Samuel Frauenthal (1862–1935), associate justice of the Arkansas Supreme Court

== See also ==
- Frauenthal Castle, historic building in Frauental an der Laßnitz in the district of Deutschlandsberg in Styria, Austria
  - Frauental an der Laßnitz, municipality in the district of Deutschlandsberg in the Austrian state of Styria
- Frauenthal Center for the Performing Arts, in downtown Muskegon, Michigan
- Frauenthal & Schwarz Building, historic commercial building in Conway, Arkansas
- Frauenthal House (disambiguation), various houses
