= Frauenthal House =

Frauenthal House may refer to:

- Frauenthal House (Conway, Arkansas), listed on the National Register of Historic Places (NRHP)
- Clarence Frauenthal House, Heber Spring, Arkansas, NRHP-listed, also known as Frauenthal House
- Frauenthal House (Little Rock, Arkansas), NRHP-listed

== See also ==
- Frauenthal & Schwarz Building, Conway, Arkansas, NRHP-listed
