= F&M Bank =

F&M Bank may refer to:

- Farmers and Merchants Bank (disambiguation)
- Farmers and Mechanics Bank (disambiguation)
