= Max Frauenthal =

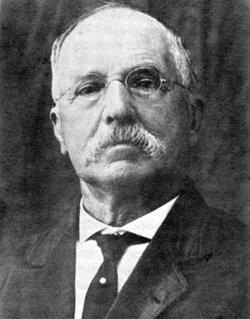
- Max Frauenthal in later life
- Born: November 11, 1836; Bavaria, German Confederation
- Died: March 8, 1914 (aged 77); McGehee, Arkansas, United States
- Occupation: Merchant
- Spouse: Sallie Jacobs
- Children: 7
- Military career
- Allegiance: Confederate States
- Branch: Confederate States Army
- Rank: Drummer
- Unit: 16th Mississippi Infantry
- Conflicts: American Civil War

Max Frauenthal (also Frankenthal, or Fronthall) (November 11, 1836 – March 8, 1914) was a leading merchant in post-bellum Arkansas, and was a founding father of Conway, Arkansas; Heber Springs, Arkansas; and Cleburne County, Arkansas. He is known for the courage he showed during the Battle of Spotsylvania Court House in the American Civil War.

== Origin of his last name ==
The name "Frauenthal" was derived from the German city the Frauenthals lived in. Max Frauenthal's grandfather, who was called simply Meyer, adopted the name Frauenthal in early nineteenth century, when the Napoleonic Code required European Jews to take surnames.

== Early life ==
Max Frauenthal was born on November 11, 1836, in Marienthal, Rhenish Bavaria. His family moved to the United States when he was 15 years old, eventually settling in Brookhaven, Mississippi, after short stints in New York City, Texas and Louisiana.

== The Civil War ==
Frauenthal enlisted in the Confederate States Army as a private in Company A of the 16th Mississippi Infantry Regiment at Summit, Mississippi; one of 1500 Jewish volunteers in the Confederate Army. Although he was officially an army drummer, he often used his musket in battle. Some of the most "terrific and long-sustained fighting" (as described by a private A. T. Watts) was fought at Bloody Acute Angle at Spotsylvania, Virginia, on May 12, 1864. For several hours, surrounded by the soldiers from Union Army, Frauenthal fought between the "most terrific hail of lead, and coolly and deliberately loaded and fired without cringing."

Frauenthal's bravery made a lasting impression on Watts. Almost 30 years after the battle, in an 1893 letter, Watts (by then a judge in Dallas) wrote:

I cannot forego the mention of one individual. Fronthall, a little Jew, though insignificant in appearance, had the heart of a lion ... I now understand how it was that a handful of Jews could drive before them the hundred kings; they were all Fronthalls!

The phrase "a regular Fronthall" was used to refer to the bravest soldiers in 16th Regiment. Brought home by the veterans from Texas, it is still in use in the area around Galveston.

== Post-bellum ==
In 1869, Frauenthal married Sallie Jacobs, a native of Baltimore, in Louisville, Kentucky. They had 13 children; six survived to adulthood. Frauenthal would go on to have an impact in the commercial and civic development of both Conway and Heber Springs.

Frauenthal moved to Conway Station in 1871 and opened the new railroad town's second store in 1872. Rather than locate on the town square, Frauenthal located his store on the alley where he noticed the farmers would park their wagons. As a result, the shoppers visited his store first making it the most successful. Other retailers took notice and located their stores on the alley as well, moving the retail nexus from the square to what would later become Front Street. In 1875, Frauenthal was among the 30 petitioners to incorporate "Conway" as a town, dropping "Station" from its name. After a fire destroyed Front Street in 1878, Frauenthal was the first to rebuild, erecting the growing town's first brick building (which included Conway's first plate glass window) in 1879.

In 1881, Frauenthal bought land in Van Buren County from John T. Jones. He founded the Sugar Loaf Springs Company and plotted a town site which was incorporated as "Sugar Loaf" on October 4, 1882. In 1883, Frauenthal donated land for the courthouse square, built a frame courthouse to be used by the soon to be created Cleburne County, and donated the land for Spring Park, thus securing the county seat for the new town. Frauenthal chose the name Cleburne to honor Confederate General Patrick Cleburne, who was killed in the Battle of Franklin in 1864. In 1910, Sugar Loaf's name was changed to Heber Springs in order to avoid confusion with another town with a post office named Sugar Loaf. Frauenthal chose the new name to honor John T. Jones's son, Dr. Heber Jones, who was a prominent physician in Memphis, Tennessee, where Frauenthal had since moved. Some hold that "Heber" is reminiscent of the Hebrew word meaning "Pleasant."

Frauenthal died on March 8, 1914, and is buried at Temple Israel Cemetery in Memphis.

== See also ==
- Frauenthal & Schwarz Building, Conway, Arkansas, NRHP-listed
- Frauenthal House (Conway, Arkansas), listed on the National Register of Historic Places (NRHP)
- Clarence Frauenthal House, Heber Spring, Arkansas, NRHP-listed, also known as Frauenthal House
- Frauenthal House (Little Rock, Arkansas), NRHP-listed
