= The Commons Shopping Center =

Shopping mall in Martinsburg, West Virginia

Coordinates: 39.44036°N 77.99251°W

The Commons
- Location: Martinsburg, West Virginia, United States
- Opened: 2009; 17 years ago
- Developer: AIG Baker, LLC.
- Owner: RCG Ventures
- Num. of anchor tenants: 10
- Floor area: 279,201 square feet (26,000 m^{2})
- Floors: 1
- Public transit: EPTA bus: 14, 30, 40
- Website: rcgventures.com/properties/the-commons-2

The Commons is a power center in Martinsburg, West Virginia. United States, situated along Interstate 81. It is anchored by Aldi, Best Buy, Books-A-Million, Dick's Sporting Goods, Michaels, Old Navy, PetSmart, Target, TJ Maxx, and Ulta Beauty.

== History ==
The initial plans for The Commons were submitted to the Berkeley County Planning Commission in February 2007. The original plans proposed a 104,231-square-foot (9,683.4 m^{2}) tenant to be beside Target. A major tenant had withdrawn from the project and was replaced with a 50,000-square-foot (4,600 m^{2}) Dick's Sporting Goods. Development started on The Commons shopping center in May 2008. The 45-acre (180,000 m^{2}) site was developed and is managed by AIG Baker, LLC. The first store (Bed Bath & Beyond) opened in early July 2009 with eight other anchors opening within the next 45 days. Staples opened on March 6, 2010.

In December 2012, an American Automobile Association office moved into the center from downtown. Stapes closed on January 17, 2015. The space was planned to be expanded and replaced with an Aldi in 2019. A 111-room Hilton Garden Inn was slated to open in spring 2016. On June 30, 2017, Bath & Body Works opened, previously residing at Martinsburg Mall.

On October 16, 2020, the Bed Bath & Beyond was announced to close alongside 62 other stores. In 2019, a shopping center was proposed across the street from The Commons with Weis Markets and HomeGoods as tenants. Weis opened on February 3, 2021.
