= Apple Blossom Mall =

- Apple Blossom Mall in July 2020
- Location: Winchester, Virginia, U.S.
- Coordinates: 39°9′37″N 78°9′47.4″W
- Opened: October 6, 1982; 44 years ago
- Renovated: July 30, 2013; 13 years ago
- Developer: New England Development
- Manager: Simon Property Group
- Owner: Simon Property Group (49.1%)
- Num. of stores: 66
- Num. of anchor tenants: 4 (3 open, 1 vacant)
- Floor area: 473,672 square feet (44,006 m^{2})
- Floors: 1
- Parking: Lit Parking Lot
- Public transit: PVTA bus: 102, 103
- Website: simon.com/mall/apple-blossom-mall

Apple Blossom Mall is a regional mall in Winchester, Virginia, just off of Interstate 81 and U.S. Route 50. It is partially owned and operated by Simon Property Group. The mall has three anchors, JCPenney, AMC Classic, and Belk (formerly Leggett). Its single vacant anchor space was formerly occupied by Sears.

== History ==
=== 1982–1999: Development, opening, and early years ===
Cinema VI (June 2012)

Apple Blossom Mall was developed by New England Development. Announced tenants were JCPenney, Leggett, F&M Bank, a six-screen cinema, "80 smaller stores", and Sears, which opened on July 26, 1982. The rest of the mall opened on October 6, 1982. Cinema VI opened two of its six screens on December 10, 1982, the rest were set to open on Christmas.

In 1999, Simon Property Group acquired the mall. They own and manage 49% of the property.

=== 2000s–present: Renovation and Sears closure ===
Food court (October 2011)

In 2007, Simon Property Group announced the development of a lifestyle center at Apple Blossom Mall. The addition was slated to include two big box stores, an additional department store, new restaurants, and an RC Theatres 16-screen complex. Construction on the theatres was planned to begin in the spring of 2007 with its opening scheduled between late 2007 and early 2008. The lifestyle center, however, never materialized.

In mid-2012, mall representatives announced to renovate the mall, which included new floors and lighting, and a children's play area. The older six-screen Carmike was demolished and replaced with Apple Blossom 12, a newer twelve-screen Carmike cinema which was completed the next year. Renovations were completed by July 30, 2013. In March 2017, the Carmike was planned to be converted into an AMC Classic.

On November 7, 2019, it was announced that Sears would be closing the Apple Blossom Mall location in February 2020 as part of their plan to close 96 stores nationwide. On March 29, 2020, the mall closed temporarily due to the COVID-19 pandemic. It reopened on May 15, 2020.

== See also ==
- List of shopping malls in Virginia
- Foxcroft Towne Center at Martinsburg
