= FMB =

FMB may refer to:

- Falcon Marching Band, of Bowling Green State University
- Famous Maroon Band, of Mississippi State University
- Federación Mexicana de Baloncesto, a basketball federation in Mexico
- Federation of Master Builders, in the United Kingdom
- First Merchant Bank, a Malawi bank
- Flavored malt beverage
- "Foggy Mountain Breakdown", a 1949 bluegrass song
- Fort Myers Beach, a town in Florida, United States
- Funky Monkey Babys, a Japanese band

== See also ==
- Farmers and Merchants Bank (disambiguation)
