= United States Post Office–Geneva =

US Post Office-Geneva may refer to:

- United States Post Office (Geneva, Nebraska), listed on the NRHP in Nebraska
- United States Post Office (Geneva, New York), listed on the NRHP in New York
