= Geneva Downtown Commercial Historic District (Geneva, New York) =

Historic district in New York, United States

- U.S. National Register of Historic Places
- U.S. Historic district
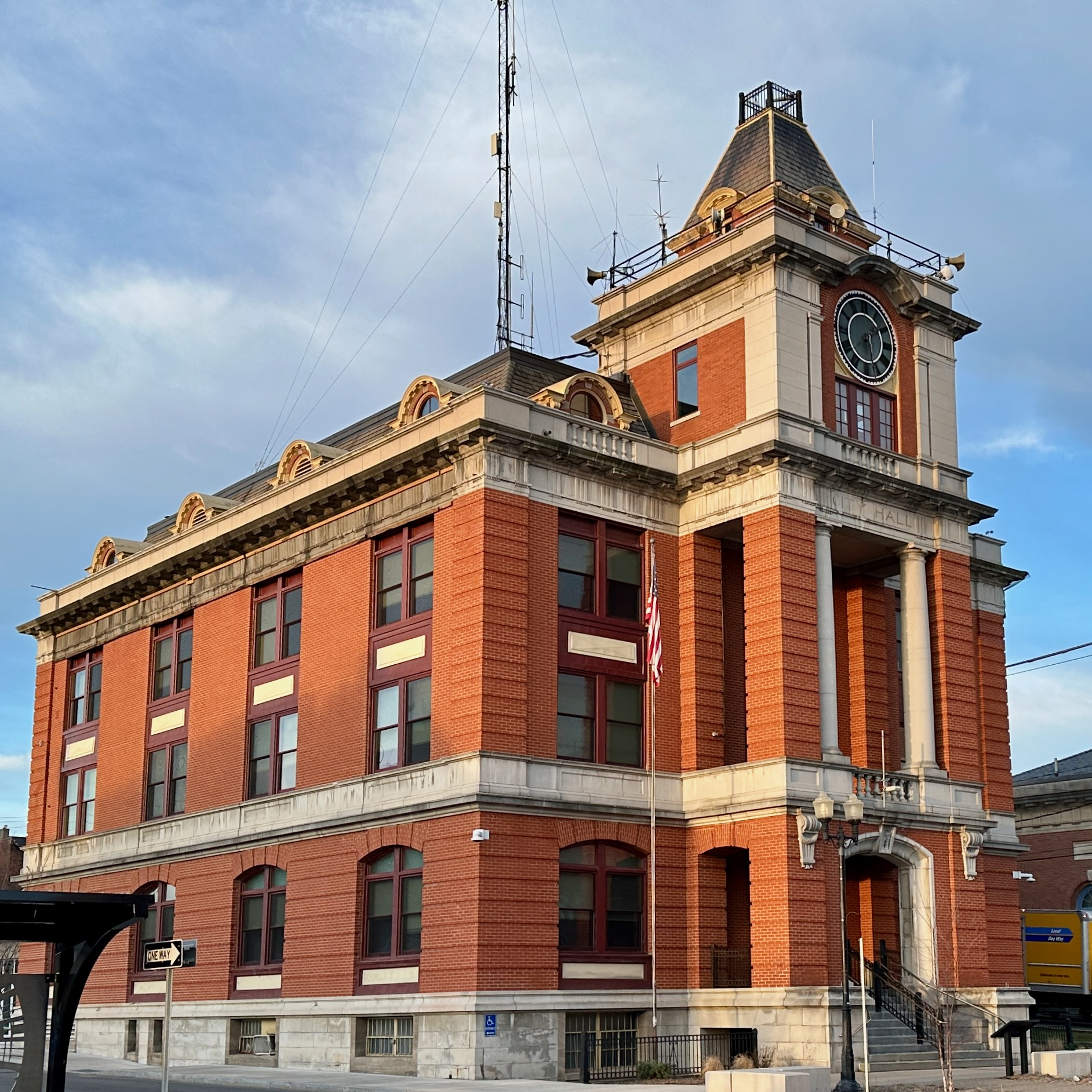
- Geneva City Hall, 2024

- Location within New York Location within the United States
- Location: 8-156 Castle, 16 & 20 E. Castle, 396-555 Exchange, 20-120 Seneca, 24-52 Linden & 317, 319, 325 & 329 Main Sts., Geneva, New York
- Coordinates: 42°52′04″N 76°59′01″W
- Area: 14.54 acres (5.88 ha)
- Built: 1840
- Built by: Solomon Persons and Edward Siglar
- Architect: Pierce & Bickford; Lloyd Phillips Adams
- Architectural style: Greek Revival, Romanesque, Italianate, Colonial Revival, Art Deco, et al.
- NRHP reference No.: 14000225
- Added to NRHP: May 20, 2014

Geneva Downtown Commercial Historic District is a national historic district located at Geneva, Ontario County, New York. It encompasses 83 contributing buildings in the central business district of Geneva. They were built between about 1840 and 1940, and include notable examples of Greek Revival, Italianate, Romanesque Revival, Colonial Revival, and Art Deco style commercial architecture. Located in the district are the separately listed Farmers and Merchants Bank, Smith's Opera House, and United States Post Office. Other notable buildings include the Prouty Block (1876), YMCA (1902), Wheat Building (1904), Guard Building (1917, 1924), Geneva City Hall (1913, 1940), Odd Fellows Building (1884-1890), and Kresge Building (1928).

It was listed on the National Register of Historic Places in 2014.
