= Farmers' State Bank (Volga, Iowa) =

- U.S. National Register of Historic Places
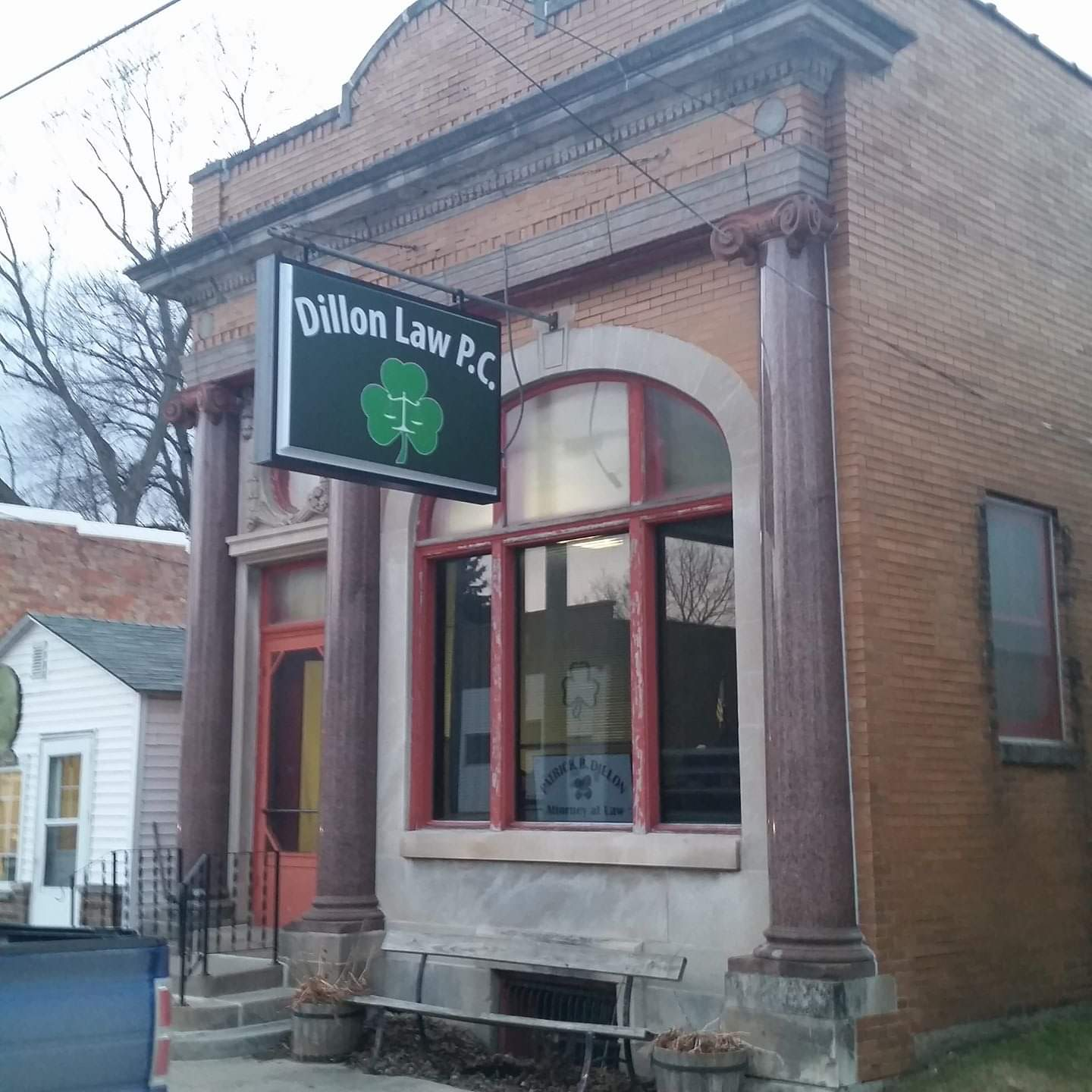

- Location within Iowa Location within the United States
- Location: 502 Washington St. Volga, Iowa
- Coordinates: 42°48′11″N 91°32′28″W
- Area: less than one acre
- Built: 1912
- Built by: E.M. Loop
- Architect: Netcott and Donnan
- Architectural style: Beaux-Arts
- NRHP reference No.: 99000740
- Added to NRHP: September 24, 2018

Farmers' State Bank is a historic building located in Volga, Iowa, United States. Its significance is derived from its Beaux-Arts architecture and the bank's role in the town's early 20th-century agriculture-based economy and railroad development along a branch of the Chicago, Milwaukee & St. Paul Railroad. Completed in 1912, the Beaux Arts elements on the buildings main façade includes a large elliptical-arch window, Ionic granite columns, classical entablature, and circle window above the door framed by garlands. Farmers' State Bank was Volga's second financial institution. It survived the downturn in the farm economy in the 1920s before it merged with the other bank in town in 1931 to form Iowa State Savings Bank. That bank used this building until the following year when it failed. The city of Volga acquired the building in 1935 and used it for its public library and city hall. It was used for a bank again from 1947 to 2015 when it housed Volga State Bank and the Volga branch of Central State Bank of Elkader. The building then housed a law office. It was listed on the National Register of Historic Places in 2018.
