= Foxcroft Towne Center at Martinsburg =

Former mall in Martinsburg, West Virginia

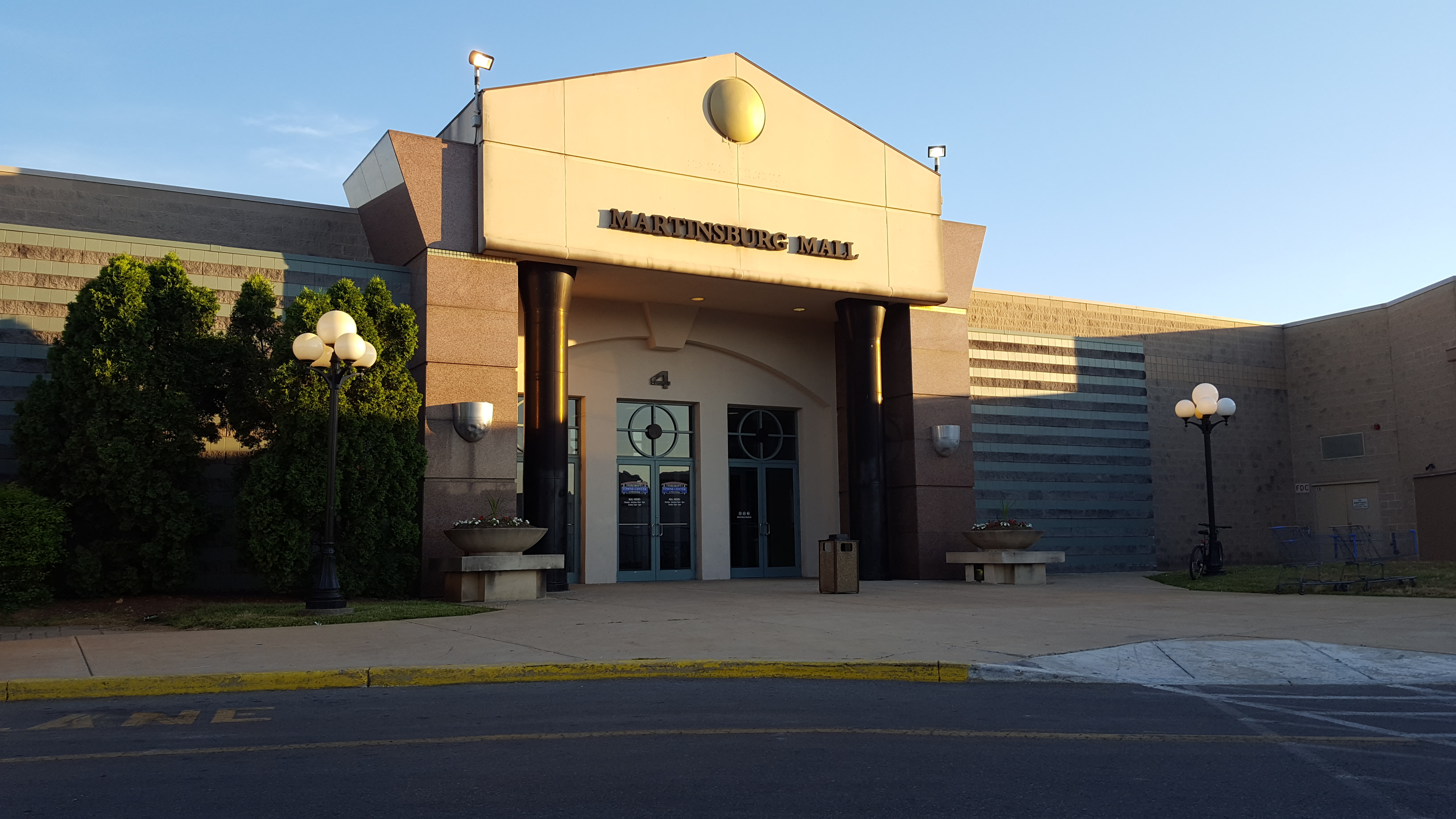
- Entrance to Foxcroft Towne Center at Martinsburg, June 2016
- Location: Martinsburg, West Virginia, United States
- Coordinates: 39°27′2″N 77°59′9″W
- Opened: October 2, 1991; 35 years ago
- Closed: November 1, 2016; 10 years ago
- Previous names: Martinsburg Mall (1991-2015)
- Developer: Crown American
- Manager: Paramount Development Corporation
- Owner: Paramount Development Corporation
- Num. of anchor tenants: 4
- Floor area: 670,000 square feet (62,000 m^{2})
- Floors: 1
- Parking: 5000
- Public transit: EPTA bus: 10, 14, 25, 30, 35, 40
- Website: paramountdevcorp.com/projects/foxcroft-towne-center

Foxcroft Towne Center at Martinsburg (formerly Martinsburg Mall) was a regional shopping mall in Martinsburg, West Virginia, situated off of Interstate 81 and Route 45. It was a retail hub for the eastern panhandle of West Virginia. The property was redeveloped into an outdoor shopping center.

== History ==
=== 1990–1998: Development, opening, and anchor changes ===
The gazebo in Foxcroft Towne Center (July 2011)

Martinsburg Mall was developed and owned by Crown American. The mall started construction in May 1990, with over 20 stores leasing the property. Announced retailers were Brooks, County Seat, Foot Locker, Gemstone Jewelry, Jolly Time Arcade, Lerner New York, Payless Shoe Source, and Regis Hair-stylists. The mall opened on October 2, 1991, with almost 50 stores and a food court. It could contain up to 97 stores and 8 kiosks. Anchor stores were Hess's, JCPenney, Sears, and Walmart, with space for a possible fifth anchor. Attractions included "Par for the Course" (an indoor mini-golf course), a carousel, and an arcade.

From 1991 to October 5, 2016, Foxcroft Towne Center held a joint program with West Virginia University Healthcare for mall walkers called the “Healthy Start Mall Walking” program. Three laps around the mall equaled two miles.

Hess's was renovated and converted into The Bon-Ton in January 1995, after 19 of its stores were purchased by Bon-Ton the previous year.

In October 1998, Walmart expanded its location from a discount store to a Supercenter, making it the largest in the Eastern panhandle and Hagerstown areas.

=== 2003–2018: Decline, closure, and interior demolition ===
The former logo used from 2005 to the early 2010s

In 2004, Lightstone bought Martinsburg Mall from PREIT (who acquired Crown American in the previous year), in a transaction with four other malls.

In 2008, Martinsburg Mall defaulted on a $80.9 million dollar debt, leading to receivership in January 2009 with Jones Lang LaSalle as the manager. In 2010, Mountain State University purchased the Martinsburg Mall. The university planned to use existing vacant space inside the mall to create a conference area and classrooms. In July 2012, MSU announced that it would be selling the mall help stay financially afloat in the wake of its accreditation issues. On May 24, 2013, the mall was sold to Paramount Development Cooperation.

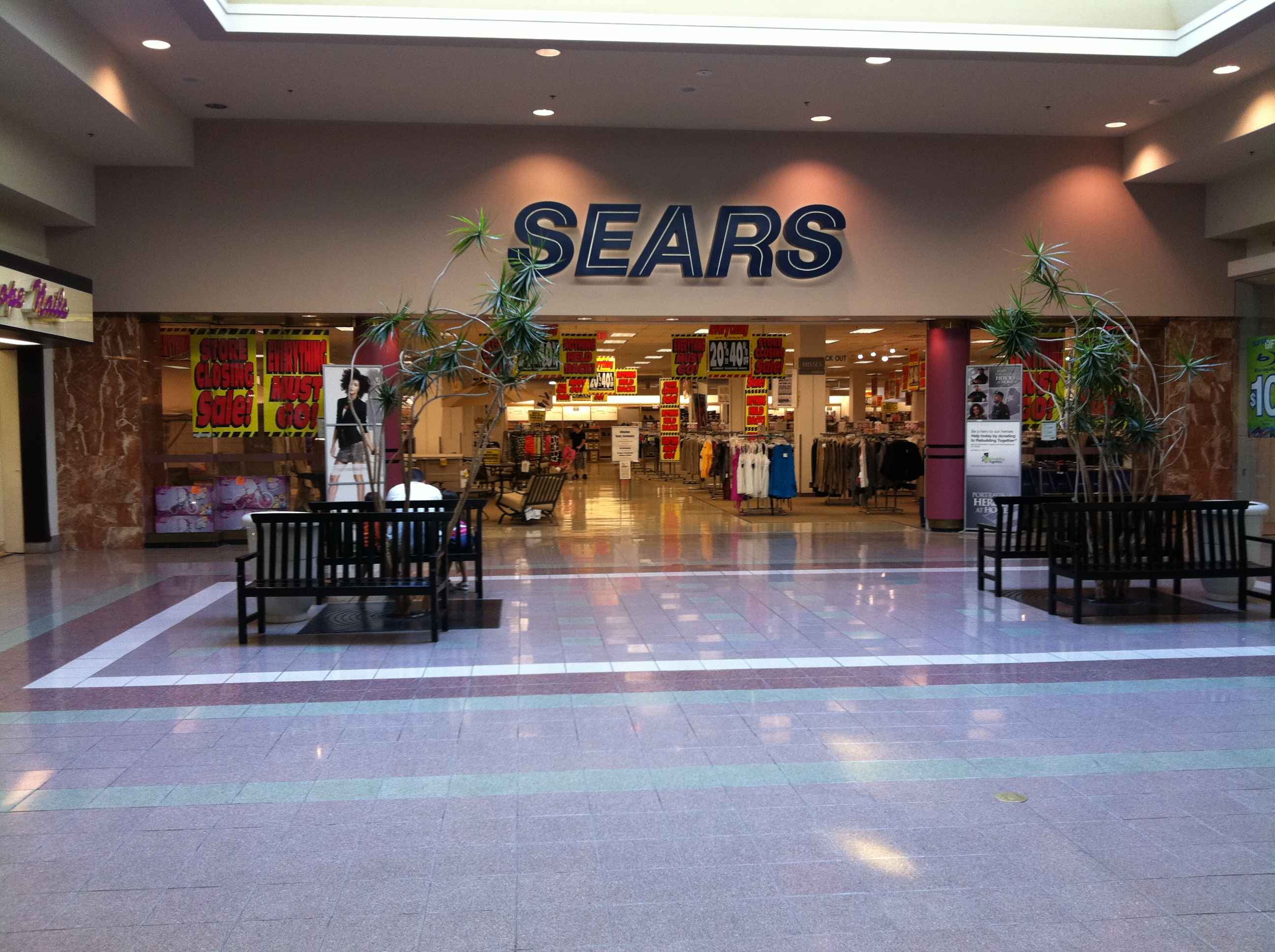
Sears liquidation sale (July 2011)

Demolition of the former Sears wing (March 2017), to the left was the former Hibbett Sports

Sears closed in 2011 and was demolished three years later.

Martinsburg Mall changed its name to Foxcroft Towne Center at Martinsburg effective October 1, 2015. On September 7, 2016, owners announced that the interior portion of the mall would close on November 1, 2016. This was demolished, leaving The Bon-Ton, JCPenney, and Walmart. They stated that the mall struggled due to vacancies and competing malls in Hagerstown and Winchester. Fifteen tenants resided in the mall among its closure. JCPenney closed in the summer of 2017, closing among 138 other stores in the chain. The Bon-Ton closed in 2018.

=== 2012–present: Redevelopment as Foxcroft Towne Center ===
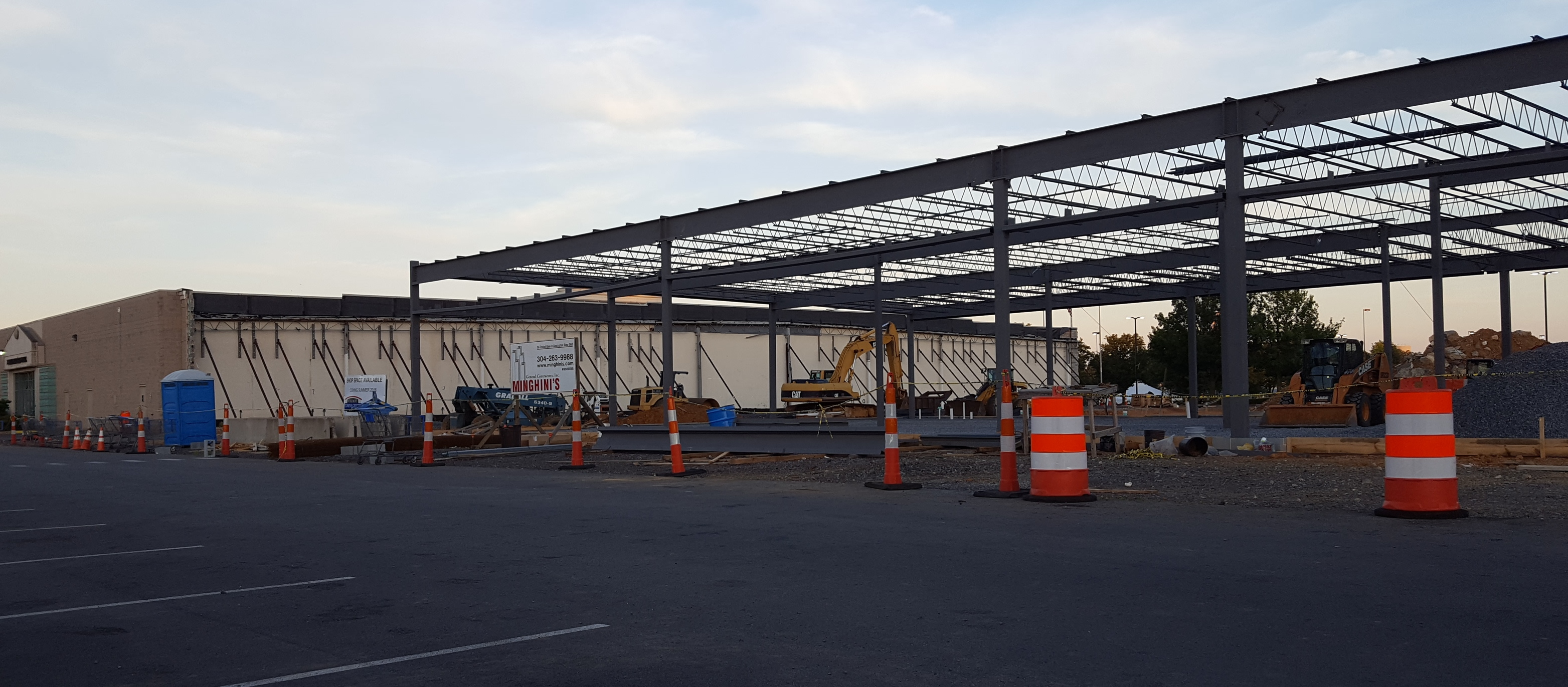
Construction of pad sites

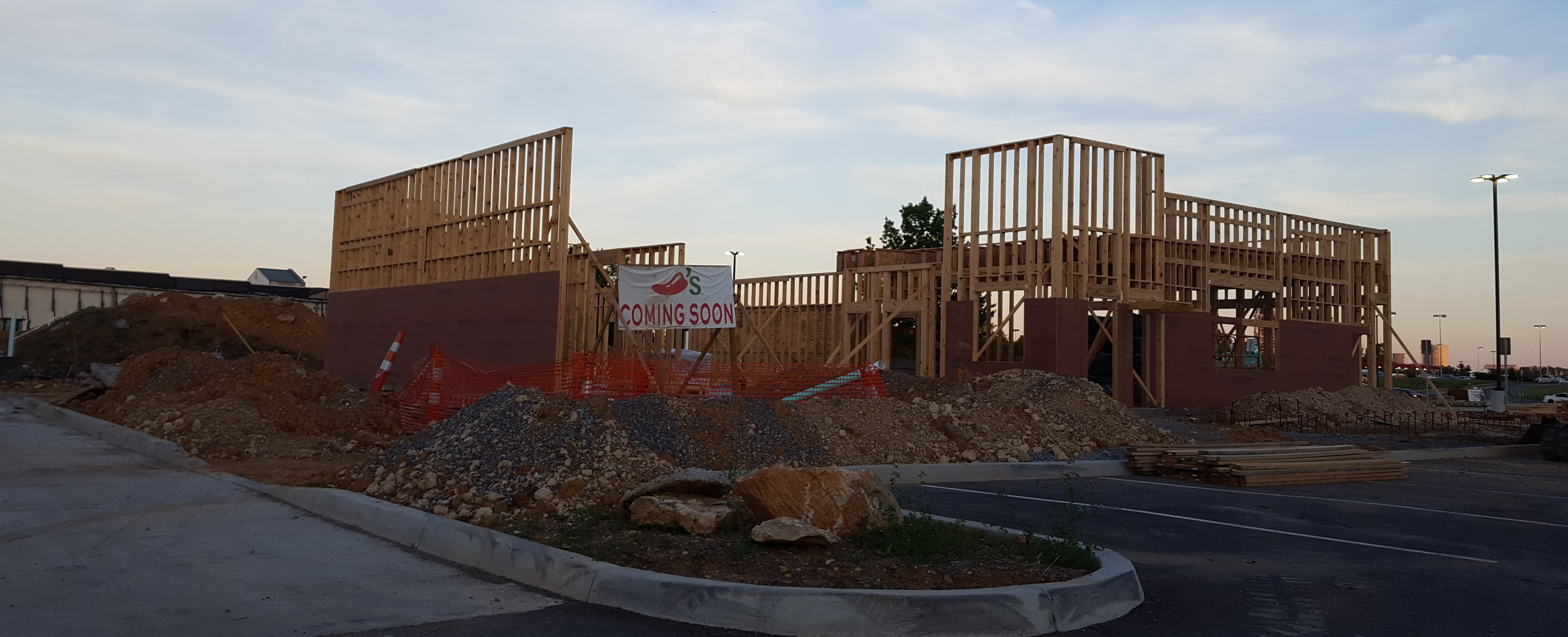
Chili's construction

Construction on the site of the former Sears (June 2016)

In October 2012, Martinsburg city officials approved a plan to redevelop the former Sears. This was part of phase one of Paramount's redevelopment plan to open several businesses in six new pad sites. This included Chili's, Firehouse Subs, Panera Bread, Mattress Warehouse, and some empty retail spaces. Olive Garden opened on an outparcel in November 2012.

In October 2016, phase two of the redevelopment plan was approved in conjunction with the demolition of the mall. Before demolition, the mall's military memorial stone was relocated to War Memorial Park. Its flags were moved to the VA Medical Center in Martinsburg after Paramount got criticized for leaving them in the demolition site. Five Guys, Great Clips, Kay Jewelers (which relocated from the mall), T-Mobile, and Wingstop opened on the property. In December, Angelo’s Pizza reopened on Foxcroft Avenue, previously closing alongside the interior mall.

Hobby Lobby opened in the former JCPenney on April 16, 2018, and the former Bon-Ton became a Grand Home Furnishings on January 11, 2019. The anchors are Walmart, Hobby Lobby, and Grand Home Furnishings. Ross announced it would open on October 24, 2020 and Home2 Suites planned to open four days later. Onelife Fitness opened by April 18, 2024. Walmart underwent a renovation which was completed on June 21, 2024. On July 10, 2024, Tru by Hilton opened nearby the shopping center.

== Gallery ==
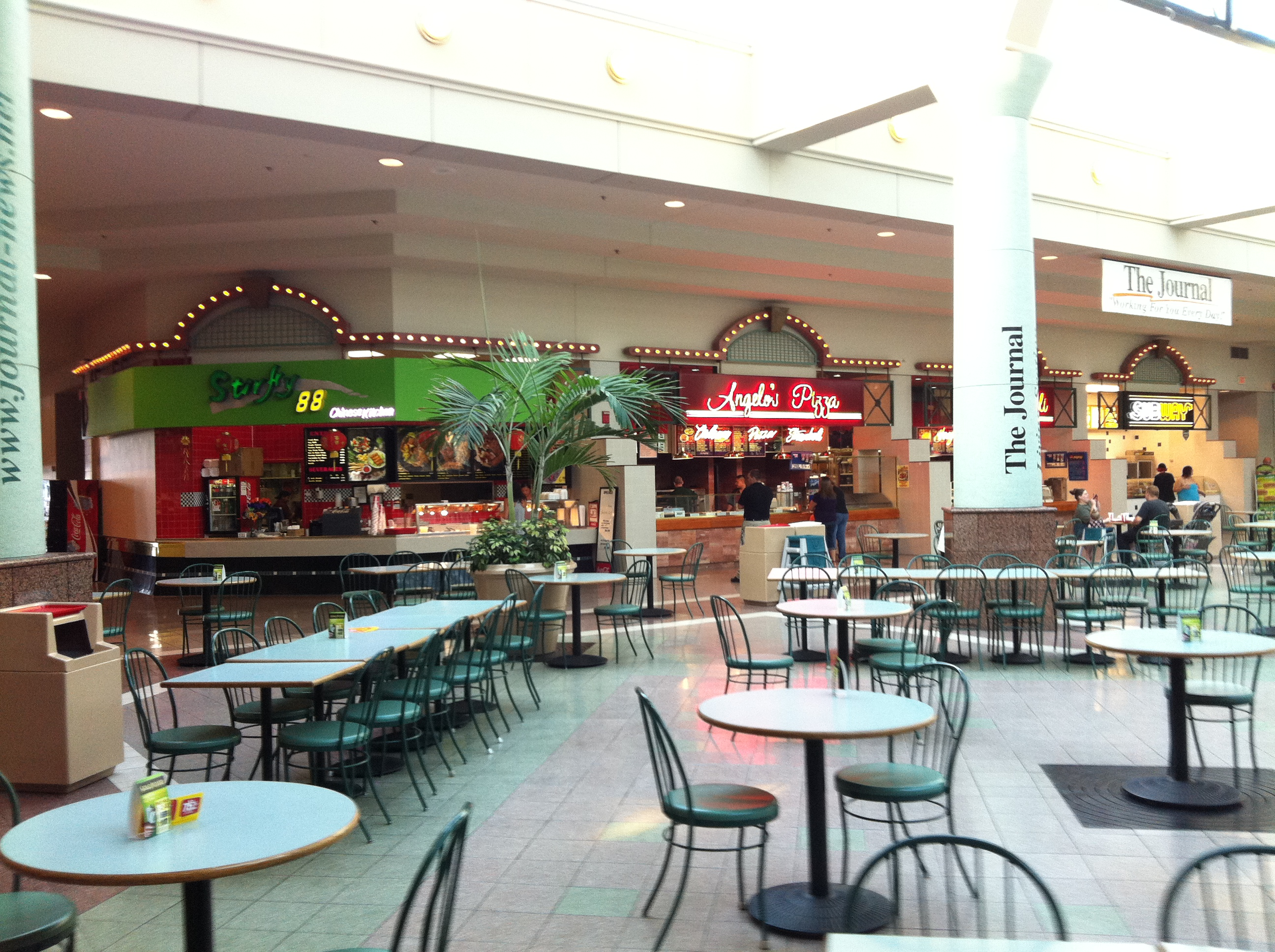
Food Court

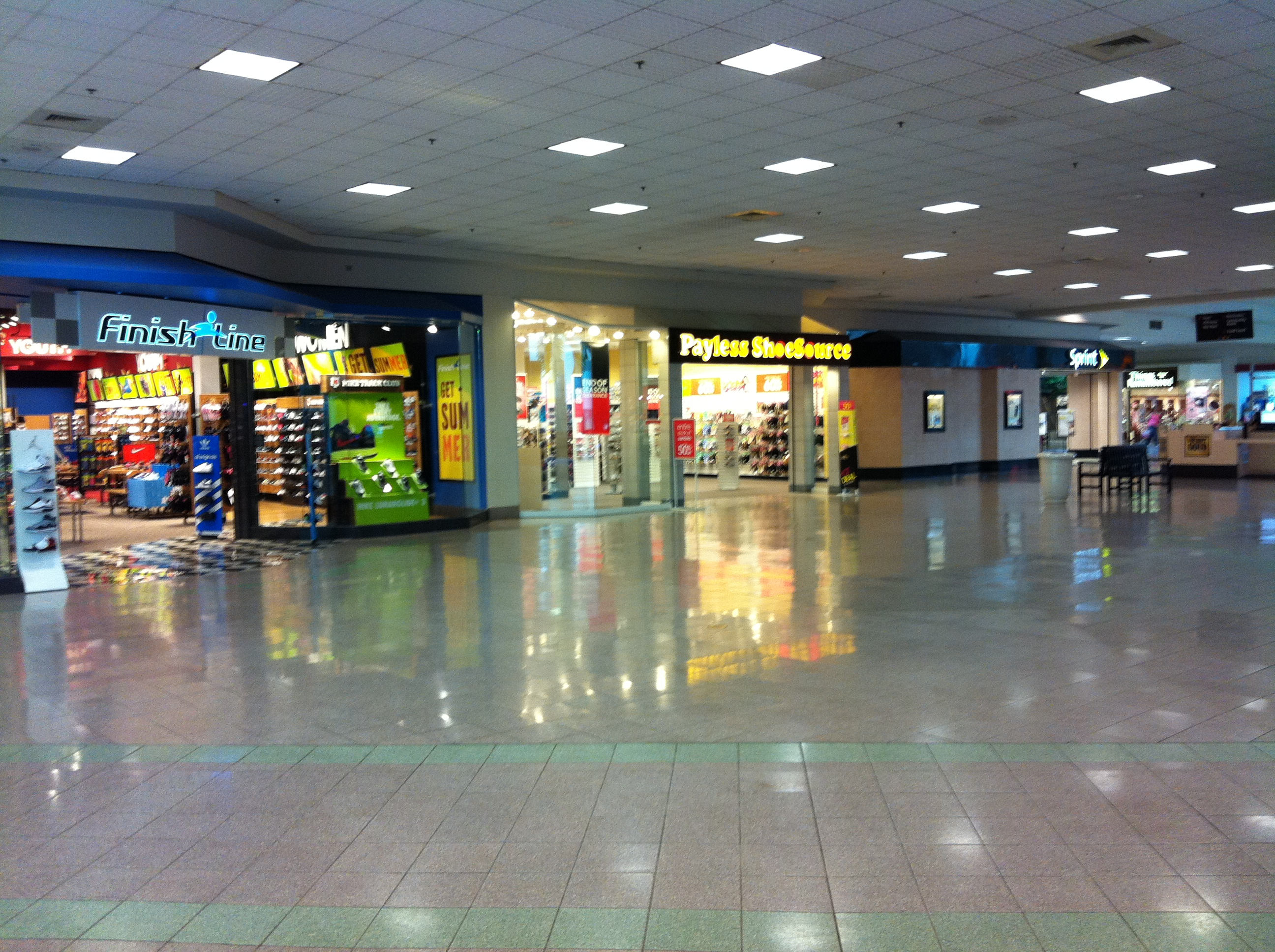
Finish Line, Payless, and Sprint

Sealed-off Walmart mall entrance

JCPenney

Sears

The Bon-Ton

Walmart

Demolition of the Food Court

== See also ==
- List of shopping malls in West Virginia
- The Commons Shopping Center
- Valley Mall (Hagerstown)
- Apple Blossom Mall
- Frederick Towne Mall
- Country Club Mall
