= Smith's Opera House =

- Smith Opera House
- U.S. National Register of Historic Places
- U.S. Historic district – Contributing property
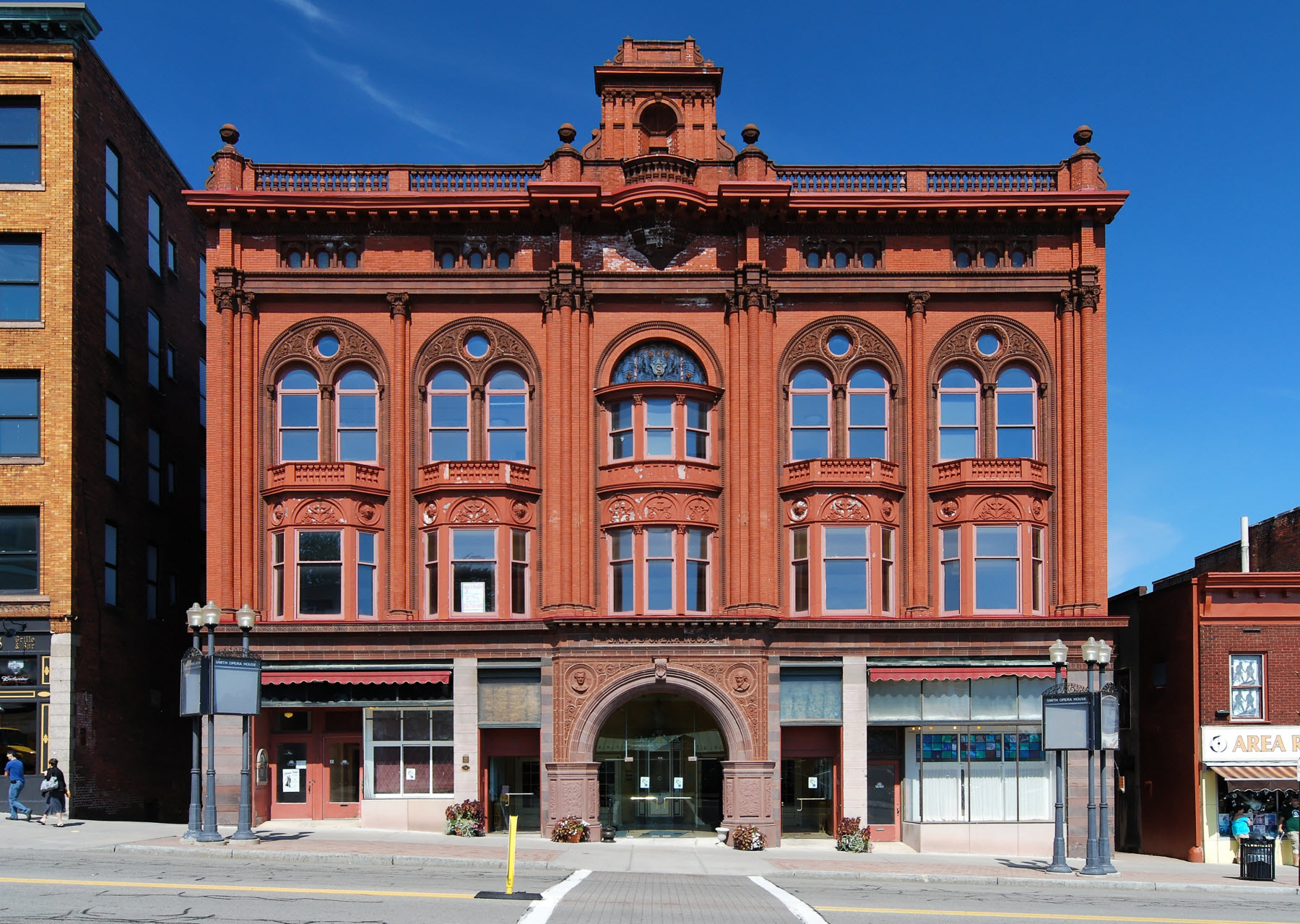
- Smith Opera House, September 2012

- Location within New York Location within the United States
- Location: 82 Seneca St., Geneva, New York
- Coordinates: 42°51′53″N 76°59′4″W
- Area: 0 acres (0 ha)
- NRHP reference No.: 02001454
- Added to NRHP: October 10, 1979

Smith Opera House, also known as the Geneva Theater, the Smith, and Smith's Opera House, is a historic theater building located at Geneva in Ontario County, New York. It was constructed in 1894 and is a 3 1/2-story, detached brick-and-stone building. It was built by one of Geneva's most respected citizens, William Smith, to a design by the architecture firm Pierce & Bickford. It was renovated in 1931 as a movie theater by architect Victor Rigaumount in a unique combination of Art Deco and Baroque motifs. At one time, it was part of the Schine Theater Chain and was substantially redecorated and redesigned under their ownership. In the late 1960s the theater changed to the ownership of Panther Enterprises and was renamed simply The Geneva Theater. The Geneva Theatre was renamed Smith Opera House in 1983.

It was listed on the National Register of Historic Places in 1979. It is located in the Geneva Commercial Historic District.
