= Farmers State Bank (Conway, Arkansas) =

Historic building

- U.S. National Register of Historic Places
- U.S. Historic district – Contributing property
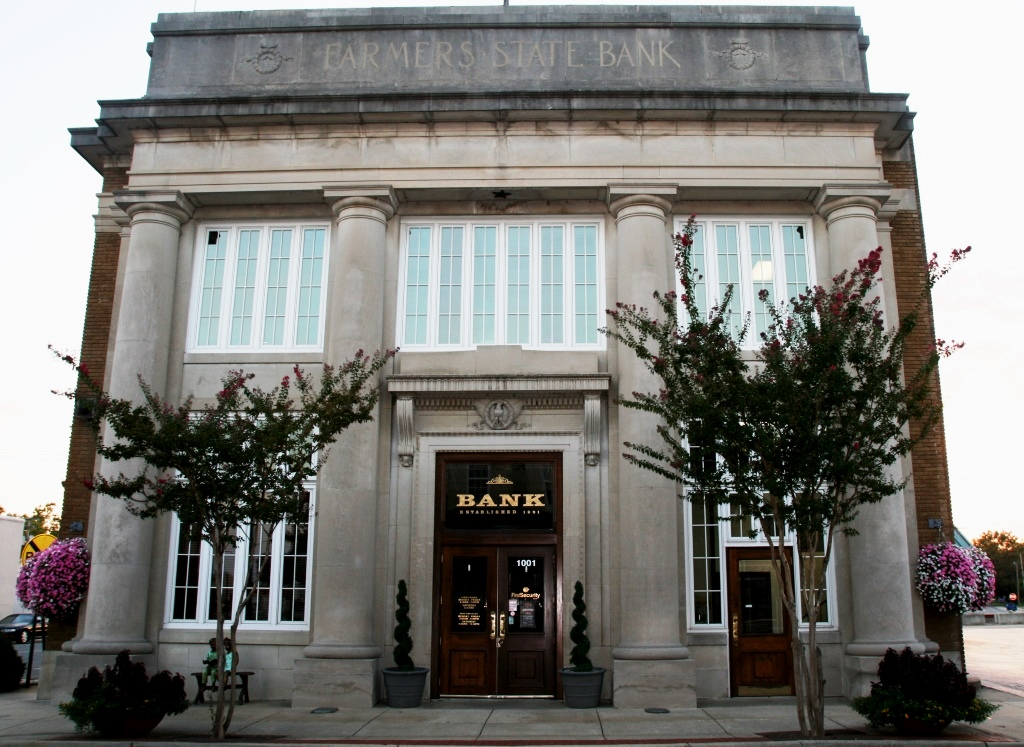

- Location within Arkansas Location within the United States
- Location: 1001 Front St., Conway, Arkansas
- Coordinates: 35°5′31″N 92°26′28″W
- Area: less than one acre
- Built: 1918
- Architect: Thompson & Harding
- Architectural style: Classical Revival
- Part of: Conway Commercial Historic District (ID10000779)
- MPS: Thompson, Charles L., Design Collection TR
- NRHP reference No.: 82000812

Significant dates
- Added to NRHP: December 22, 1982
- Designated CP: September 23, 2010

The Farmers State Bank is a historic commercial building at 1001 Front Street in Conway, Arkansas. It is a two-story masonry building designed in the Classical Revival style. Its side walls are finished in brick, and most of its facade is in stone. The dominant feature of the facade are four massive engaged Tuscan columns, which support an entablature, cornice, and parapet. The main entrance is set in the central bay, with a bracketed hood above. It was designed by Thompson & Harding and built about 1918.

The building was listed on the National Register of Historic Places in 1982.

== See also ==
- National Register of Historic Places listings in Faulkner County, Arkansas
