= Eastern Panhandle Transit Authority =

Transit agency in West Virginia

- MARC shuttle in October 2026
- Formerly: PanTran
- Founded: June 1975; 51 years ago
- Commenced operation: November 1976; 50 years ago
- Headquarters: 446 Novak Dr, Martinsburg, WV
- Service area: Martinsburg, Berkeley County, Jefferson County
- Service type: bus service, paratransit, non-emergency medical transit
- Routes: 14
- Hubs: Martinsburg station, Gabe's, VA Medical Center
- Fleet: 23 vehicles
- Annual ridership: 193,113 (2016)
- Website: www.eptawv.com

The Eastern Panhandle Transit Authority (EPTA) formerly known as PanTran, is a public bus operator for Berkeley County, and Jefferson County, West Virginia. The agency operates fixed and demand-response transit as well as bus shuttles for Shepherd University and MARC.

== Fares ==
Since 2017, the Eastern Panhandle Transit Authority operates on a zone-based fare system. Travel in Martinsburg costs $2.00, travel between Martinsburg and Inwood costs $2.50, travel between Martinsburg and Charles Town costs $3.00, and travel between Martinsburg and Harpers Ferry costs $3.50. The agency uses fare cards, day passes, and monthly passes.

== Routes ==
=== Fixed routes ===
The Eastern Panhandle Transit Authority operates the following routes:

- Route 10
- Route 11
- Route 12
- Route 14
- Route 16 (Jefferson County)
- Route 18 (Inwood)
- Route 20 (Jefferson County)
- Route 25 (Evening)
- Route 30 (Evening)
- Route 35 (Saturday)
- Route 40 (Saturday)
- Ram Express (Shepherd University)
- Ram Force One (Shepherd University)
- MARC-Harpers Ferry
- MARC-Martinsburg

== Background ==
Between 1979 and 1980, the Eastern Panhandle Transit Authority was funded by the Transportation, Remuneration, Incentive Program (TRIP), which was a five year public transportation improvement program in West Virginia. The agency was funded by section 147 of the Federal Highway Administration, Governor's Counter-Cyclical, local, and state funds.

== History ==
=== Founding and early history ===
The Eastern Panhandle Transit Authority was founded in June 1975. Service started in November 1976. In 1994, the Federal Transit Administration's section 18 program began providing funds for the EPTA. In 2002, a bus facility was built at 446 Novak Drive in Martinsburg near the Tabler Station Business Park. The agency also drafted up a proposal to improve EPTA transit service along Route 9 to relieve traffic congestion. Around this time, the Martinsburg Mall was a major stop for the agency. In 2005, the EPTA added new routes. In December 2007, the EPTA started charter bus service for private companies in a fifty-mile radius from its headquarters. In 2012, the EPTA was designated as a "small urban area" transit system.

=== Expansion and route changes ===
From November 15, 2013, to December 15, 2013, the EPTA launched a pilot project after an agreement with Macy's to provide transportation between Hagerstown and the Macy's complex in Martinsburg. The EPTA wanted to provide full-time service to the complex and expand the pilot project into Winchester. Around the same time, a government shutdown financially affected the agency's route to Harpers Ferry. Bus service to Shepherd University started in 2014. The service started with two round trips to Caperton Train station and all day service around Shepherd University. The EPTA received a grant in 2007 to build three bus shelters, the first one being completed in 2017 via a public–private partnership at Shepherd University's Martinsburg campus for its high ridership. The agency wanted to add three more shelters at this time. In April 2018, the agency added new bus routes and realigned existing ones. This was done to add more transfers and to expand serve into Inwood. In 2019, the EPTA announced six new vehicles and busses to serve increasing ridership and to replace vehicles operating since 2011.

The COVID-19 pandemic negatively affected the EPTA's ridership and several drivers were unable to work due to illness. In June 2020, the EPTA released a transit development draft which proposed extending hours on its transit system, extending and reconfiguring routes, and discontinuing evening and Saturday service for regular bus service at those times.

In 2022, it was proposed to create a commuter bus line to the Ashburn Metrorail station by December 2023. The line planned to travel between Martinsburg and the Metro station with one intermediate stop at Ranson's Potomac Marketplace; which planned to have a park-and-ride. According to the EPTA in 2025, the proposal was "too costly". In the summer of 2023, a bus shelter was installed in the Shepherd University in front of the Stutzman-Slonaker Hall. In the fall of 2023, the shuttle bus for MARC train 875 was temporarily discontinued due to construction on U.S. Route 340. The other shuttle, which was for MARC train 883, operated on a detour. Both shuttles were restored on December 4, 2023 after the road finished completion.

In the EPTA draft plan from 2025, the agency recommended new routes and realignments of existing routes. The proposal planned to serve Spring Mills, Hedgesville, and the VA Medical Center, as well as add more Saturday routes.

==== Transit center ====
In 2016, the Eastern Panhandle Transit Authority studied to build a transit center and maintenance facility to replace the current transfer hub at Martinsburg station and the current facility at 446 Novak Drive in Martinsburg, which was over capacity and far out from where the agency served. The plan costed approximately $75,000, it was funded by the agency and the West Virginia Division of Public Transit. The project was further developed in 2017 and 2020. By 2022, the project was 30% completed.

On June 19, 2024, the EPTA started construction on the transit center, which is located at Race and Raleigh Street. This is planned to be 24,200 square feet (2,250 m^{2}) with six bays, a park and ride, and bicycle parking for the transit center and eight charging stations and a fueling station at the maintenance facility.

== See also ==
- Washington County Transit
