= Farmers State Bank of Cope =

- U.S. National Register of Historic Places
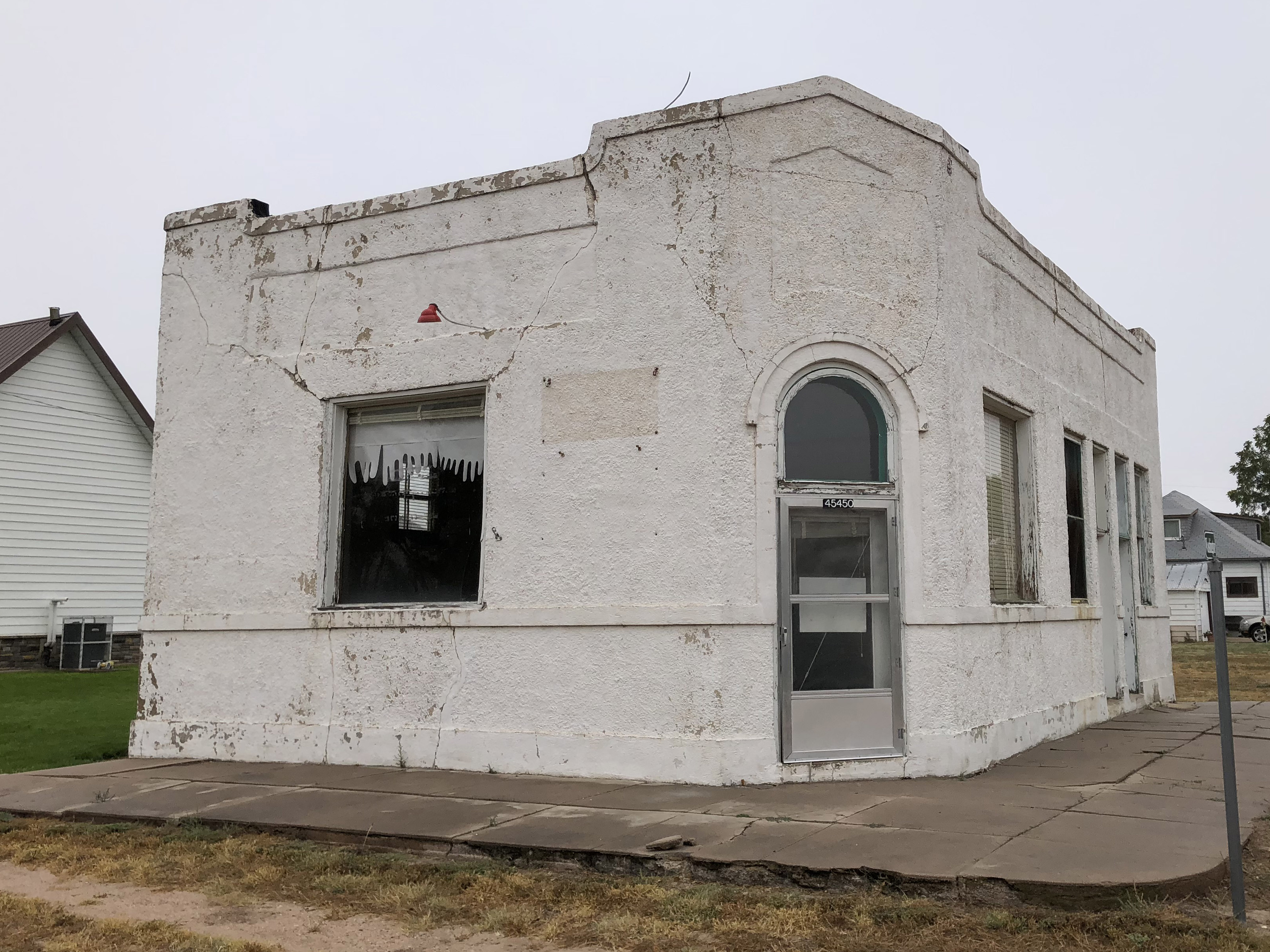

- Location within Colorado Location within the United States
- Location: 45450 Washington Ave., Cope, Colorado
- Coordinates: 39.663601°N 102.851032°W
- NRHP reference No.: 100000952
- Added to NRHP: May 8, 2017

The Farmers State Bank of Cope in Cope, Colorado was listed on the National Register of Historic Places in 2017.

There were Farmers State Bank branches in Washington County towns of Cope, Otis, and Platner as of 1922.

In 2017, there is a Farmers State Bank branch in Akron in Washington County, as well as one in Brush in Morgan County.

== See also ==
- Farmers State Bank Building
