= Conway Commercial Historic District =

Historic district in Arkansas, United States

- U.S. National Register of Historic Places
- U.S. Historic district
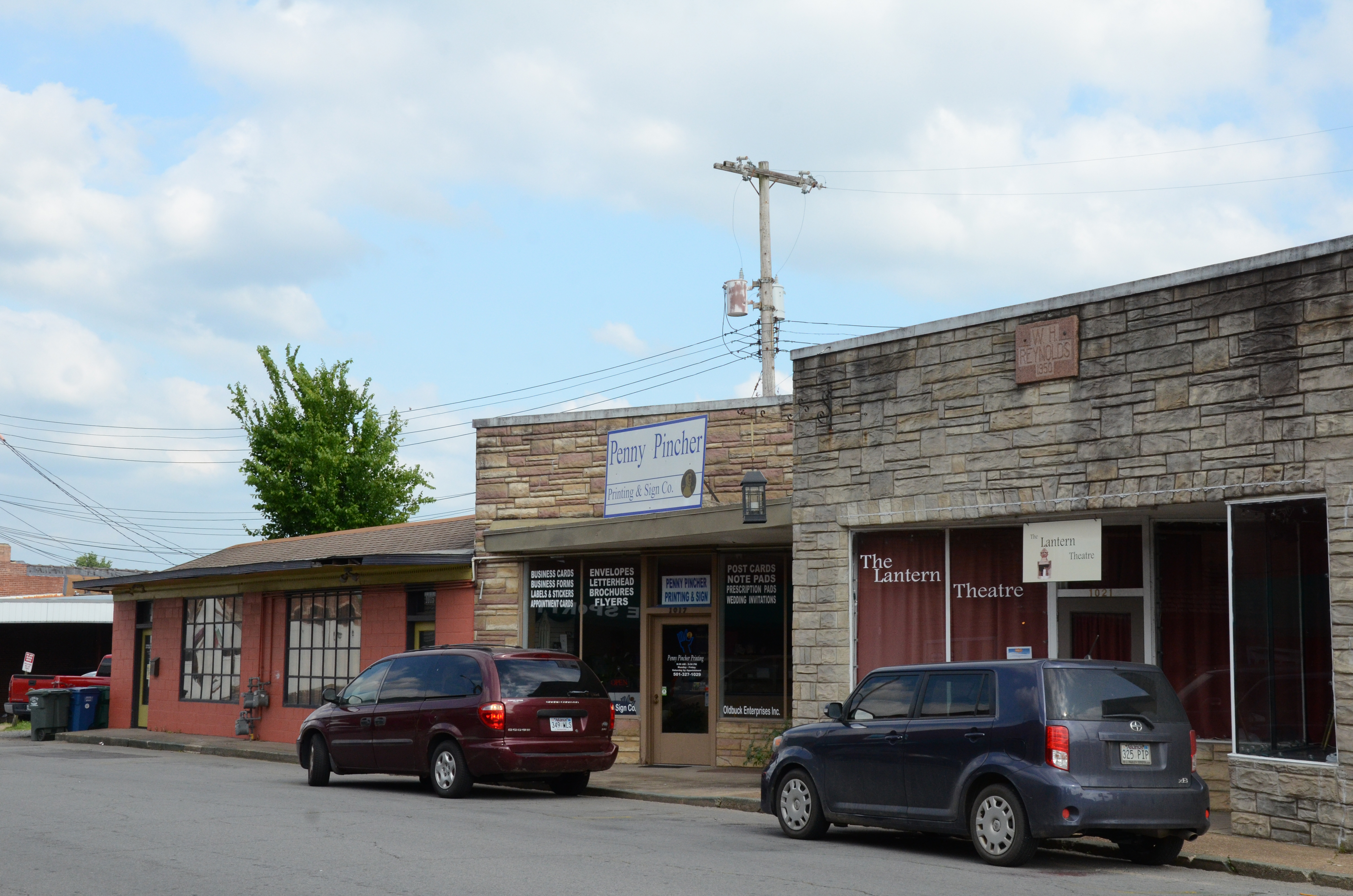

- Location within Arkansas Location within the United States
- Location: Roughly bounded by Cross, Prince, Faulkner, and Watkins Sts., and Robinson Ave., Conway, Arkansas
- Coordinates: 35°5′34″N 92°26′24″W
- Area: 34 acres (14 ha)
- Architectural style: Italianate, Classical Revival, Late Gothic Revival, International, et al.
- NRHP reference No.: 10000779
- Added to NRHP: September 23, 2010

The Conway Commercial Historic District encompasses the historic commercial heart of Conway, Arkansas. The area, roughly bounded by Main Street on the south, Harkrider and Spencer Streets on the east, just south of Mill Street to the north, and Locust Street to the west, was developed between 1879 and 1960, and includes representative architecture from four major phases of the city's development. It includes the city's oldest commercial building, the 1879 Frauenthal & Schwarz Building.

The district was listed on the National Register of Historic Places in 2001.

== See also ==
- National Register of Historic Places listings in Faulkner County, Arkansas
