= Farmers and Mechanics Bank =

Farmers and Mechanics Savings (sometimes abbreviated as F&M Bank) or variations such as Farmers and Mechanics Savings Bank may refer to:

- Farmers and Mechanics Bank (Middletown, Connecticut)
- Farmers and Mechanics Savings Bank (1891), Minneapolis, Minnesota, now Scheik's Palace Royale
- Farmers and Mechanics Savings Bank (1942), Minneapolis, Minnesota, now a Westin Hotel
- Mechanics and Farmers Bank, Durham, North Carolina
- Farmers and Mechanics National Bank (Fort Worth), Texas
- Farmers and Mechanics Bank (Georgetown), Washington, D.C.

== See also ==
- Farmers and Merchants Bank (disambiguation)
