= CBI Bank & Trust =

Community bank in Muscatine, Iowa, US

- Company type: Private company
- Industry: Financial services
- Founded: 1865; 161 years ago in Muscatine, Iowa, United States
- Headquarters: Muscatine, Iowa, United States
- Area served: East-Central Iowa, West-Central Illinois and the Illinois/Wisconsin State Line area
- Products: Retail banking, Commercial banking, savings accounts
- Owner: Central Bancshares, Inc.
- Number of employees: 250+ (2021)
- Website: www.cbibt.com

CBI Bank & Trust, formerly known as Central State Bank, is a community bank based in Muscatine, Iowa. It is a subsidiary of Central Bancshares, Inc., a bank holding company that is also based in Muscatine. Total assets are over $1.45 billion and it employs over 250 individuals.

The bank traces its origins to 1865 and as of 2021, serves over 45,000 households and businesses with a full range of banking and financial services delivered through 23 offices, as well as a variety of electronic banking channels. In addition, the bank's Trust and Investment divisions manage combined client assets of approximately $1.4 billion.

Banking facilities are located in Coralville, Buffalo, Davenport, Kalona, Muscatine, Walcott, Washington and Wilton, Iowa; Brimfield, Buffalo Prairie, Galesburg, Joy, Moline, Monmouth, Peoria and Roscoe, Illinois; and Beloit, Wisconsin.

== History ==
The story of CBI Bank & Trust actually encompasses the history of over a half dozen banks that came together over the years to form today's organization.

=== CBI Bank & Trust (formerly Central State Bank) ===
Central State Bank's history can be traced to the mid-nineteenth century, a time when "private banks" — those not open to the general public — were the norm. The private banking house of Isett and Brewster of Muscatine was one of the earliest of this type in Iowa and operated successfully for a number of years. On May 1, 1865, it was converted to a state-chartered institution, Merchants Exchange Bank, which was opened to the general public. Later that year, conversion to a national charter brought a change in name to Merchants National Exchange Bank.

In the early years, it was not unusual for banks to operate under two charters, one national and one state, with both institutions located in the same building and owned by the same stockholders. Nationally chartered banks traditionally catered to the needs of businesses and they could issue their own bank notes, which served as currency in the absence of today's Federal Reserve Notes. By contrast, state-chartered institutions emphasized serving individuals and families by accepting savings deposits and making loans for personal and home financing. In 1880, state-chartered Muscatine Savings Bank was organized for the purpose of serving the community in tandem with Merchants Exchange National Bank.

During the intervening years, this dual-bank organization continued to grow. There were a couple of name changes along the way: in 1886, Merchants National became the First National Bank of Muscatine (no relationship to the present-day entity of the same name), and in 1907, Muscatine Savings Bank changed its name to the First Trust and Savings Bank of Muscatine. Simon Casady served as the bank's President from 1909 until 1925, when he began to serve on the bank's board. The year 1933 brought a combining of banking interests into a single operating unit, a new state charter, and a change in name to Central State Bank.

From the 1930s through the 1990s the bank operated primarily in the Muscatine trade area and developed a reputation for leadership. It was among the first banks in Iowa to offer a sidewalk/walkup teller with extended hours for customer convenience (1957); the first bank in Muscatine to offer drive-up banking; the first to open an office on the community's north side (Park Avenue Banking Center, 1971) and the first to branch into the south side (Grandview Avenue Banking Center, 1977). It launched the area's first banking affinity group, the Ambassador Club (1988), and it was the first to offer in-store banking (Econofoods, 1990). It was also among the first in the area to offer ATM services, debit cards, online and mobile banking.

In 2005, the bank branched beyond Muscatine for the first time, opening an office in Wilton, Iowa. In July, 2013, two affiliate banks, Freedom Security Bank (with locations in Coralville, Iowa and Kalona, Iowa) and West Chester Saving Bank (located in Washington, Iowa) were merged into the organization, but continued to operate under their existing names as offices of Central State Bank. On April 1, 2015, the bank's parent company, Muscatine-based Central Bancshares, Inc., acquired Buffalo Prairie State Bank, Buffalo Prairie, Illinois and began operating it under its existing name as an office of Central State Bank.

On September 1, 2015, Central State Bank changed its name to CBI Bank & Trust and concurrently brought the Freedom Security Bank, West Chester Savings Bank and Buffalo Prairie State Bank offices together under the new name, logo and brand.

In August, 2016, the downtown Davenport, Iowa branch office of MidwestOne Bank was acquired and merged into the bank.

In June, 2020, Walcott Trust and Savings Bank, based in Walcott, Iowa, was merged into CBI Bank & Trust. It had been acquired by Central Bancshares, Inc. the previous December.

In February, 2021, Galesburg, Illinois-based F&M Bank was merged into CBI Bank & Trust. It had been purchased in 2002 by Central Bancshares, Inc., and operated for nearly 20 years as an independently chartered institution. Locations continue to be operated under the F&M Bank name and brand, as a division of CBI Bank & Trust.

In October, 2023, SENB Bank (formerly known as South East National Bank) was merged into CBI Bank & Trust. The Moline, Illinois-based bank had approximately $340 million in assets and six offices in the Illinois-Iowa Quad Cities and the State Line (Rockford/Beloit) region of Illinois and Wisconsin.

In January, 2024, the Joy, Illinois branch office of Farmers-Merchants Bank of Illinois merged into CBI Bank & Trust.

=== Freedom Security Bank ===
Freedom Security Bank was founded in 1899 as Farmers Savings Bank in Kalona, Iowa. It had a legacy of strong family leadership and commitment to the community through the Skola family, dating back to Fred Skola, Sr.’s employment with the bank in 1903. Three generations of the family served as President prior to the sale of the institution to Central Bancshares, Inc., in 1994.

In 2002, the bank expanded beyond the Kalona market, building a new facility at 1st Avenue and Holiday Road in Coralville, Iowa. It concurrently changed its name to Freedom Security Bank to reflect its broadened scope of operations.

In mid-2014, the bank was merged into Central State Bank, Muscatine, Iowa. It continued to operate under its former name, as an office of Central State Bank, until September 1, when all Central State Bank offices were combined under the same name and branding of CBI Bank & Trust.

=== West Chester Savings Bank ===
West Chester Savings Bank was incorporated March 6, 1900 and the organization’s first building was constructed shortly thereafter in the village of West Chester, Iowa. It opened its doors for its first day of business on July 16, 1900.

The bank enjoyed steady growth over the years. A very notable characteristic is that it never closed its doors in the 1930s during the Great Depression.

In 1948, controlling interest in the bank was sold to A.R. Wolf, his son Calvin C. Wolf, and son-in-law John Butler. In 1985, Farmers Savings Bank of Kalona purchased a controlling interest from the major stockholders and continued to operate the institution as a separate, independent entity.

In 1994, the bank was sold to Central Bancshares, Inc. of Muscatine, Iowa and in 1995, the bank charter was moved to Washington, Iowa, where a temporary bank office was leased while construction began on a 2,500 square foot permanent banking facility, which opened for business in March, 1997. In April, 2002, the West Chester facility was consolidated into Washington Banking Center and in 2005, work was completed a 4,000 square foot addition constructed to accommodate continued growth of the organization.

In July, 2014, the bank was merged into Central State Bank, Muscatine, Iowa. It continued to operate under the name West Chester Savings Bank, as an office of Central State Bank, until September 1, 2015, when all Central State Bank offices were combined under the same name and branding of CBI Bank & Trust.

=== Buffalo Prairie State Bank ===
Buffalo Prairie State Bank, located in Buffalo Prairie, Illinois, was chartered in September, 1920. Over the years it developed an excellent reputation serving the banking needs of western Rock Island County, Illinois. Growth was steady and at year-end 2014 total assets were over $71 million.

The bank was purchased by Central Bancshares, Inc., on April 1, 2015 and concurrently merged into Central State Bank, Muscatine, Iowa. It continued to operate under its former name, as an office of Central State Bank until September 1, 2015, when all Central State Bank locations were combined under the same name and branding of CBI Bank & Trust.

=== Walcott Trust and Savings Bank ===
Walcott Trust and Savings Bank was created during the Great Depression, on May 20, 1931, through the merger of two organizations: Walcott Savings Bank (organized in 1893) and Farmers Savings Bank (founded in 1904). The Werner family was involved in both banks from the time they were established, culminating in the acquisition of a controlling interest in 1949. Over the years, the bank played an important leadership role in the community and grew along with Walcott through the expansion of its staff and its facility including the addition of drive-up services, several building expansions, and an extensive renovation of the historic structure in 1998-1999. In June, 2014, WTSB opened its first branch, located in Paul Revere Square on East Kimberly Road in Davenport, Iowa.

The bank was purchased by Central Bancshares, Inc., in December, 2019 and it was subsequently merged into CBI Bank & Trust in June, 2020.

=== F&M Bank ===
The Farmers and Mechanics Bank, known as F&M Bank, was founded in 1869 in Galesburg, Illinois by Chauncey Colton. Housed in the main floor of the Union Hotel, it served the deposit and lending needs of the community.

Eventually F&M Bank was acquired by the Minneapolis-based Marquette banking organization and became known as Marquette Bank Illinois. The middle and later decades of the 20th century brought many changes. In 1969, the bank added drive-up service to their location at the corner of Cherry and Main. A decade later, in 1979, the Main Bank facility in downtown Galesburg was constructed. In 1989, the bank opened the community's first full-service, seven-day-a-week office in the Eagle Food Store on North Henderson Street. The bank opened its first branch outside of Galesburg in Peoria, Illinois on Sheridan Road. It subsequently moved to North University in 2003, then to 4900 North Glen Park Place in 2006.

In 2002, the Galesburg offices of Marquette Bank Illinois were purchased by Central Bancshares, Inc., and they began once again using the familiar F&M Bank name, logo and branding. In 2004, it built a new branch at 1230 North Henderson Street. In 2012, it acquired the Galesburg offices of Wisconsin-based Associated Bank. In July, 2016, the acquisition of Brimfield Bank, Brimfield, Illinois was completed. In 2018, construction of another Galesburg location, Seminary Square, was completed.

In February, 2021, F&M Bank was merged with CBI Bank & Trust and locations continued to be operated under the F&M Bank name and branding, as a division of CBI Bank & Trust. In December, 2021, a new location was added in Monmouth, Illinois.

=== SENB Bank ===
SENB Bank, formerly known as South East National Bank, was founded in 1961 in the Iowa-Illinois Quad Cities.In 2019 it expanded into the Stateline (Roscoe/Beloit) region of Illinois and Wisconsin and by 2023 had grown to approximately $370 million in assets and six banking centers serving Illinois, Iowa and Wisconsin.

In May, 2023, the bank’s parent company, Moline, Illinois-based McLaughlin Holding Company, entered into an agreement to be acquired by Central BAncshares, Inc. The sale was completed in October, 2023, and the SENB Bank locations were merged into CBI Bank & Trust at that time.

=== Joy, Illinois Banking Location ===
In September, 2023, Central Bancshares, Inc. announced that it had entered into an agreement with Farmers-Merchants Bank of Illinois to purchase its Joy, Illinois branch office. The proposed purchase of the branch, which was formerly known as Joy State Bank, will include all deposit accounts held at the office (approximately $62 million at the time of announcement) and $27 million in loans.

The transaction, which was subject to customary closing conditions including regulatory approval, was finalized January 26, 2024.

== Ownership ==
CBI Bank & Trust is a wholly owned subsidiary of Muscatine-based Central Bancshares, Inc. Stock in the organization is closely held and not actively traded. A majority of the outstanding shares are owned by individuals who either live in or are connected to the Muscatine, Iowa area.

== Scope of Operations ==
The bank's primary market area consists of East-Central Iowa and West-Central Illinois (Muscatine County, Iowa, Washington County, Iowa, Johnson County, Iowa, Scott County, Iowa, Rock Island County, Illinois, Knox County, Illinois, Mercer County, Illinois, Peoria County, Illinois, Warren County, Illinois), and the Illinois/Wisconsin State Line area (Rockford, Illinois and Beloit, Wisconsin).

It serves individuals, families and businesses in these trade areas through 24 full-service locations: three in Muscatine, Iowa, three in Davenport, Iowa, three in Galesburg, Illinois, three in Moline, Illinois, and one each in Buffalo, Iowa, Coralville, Iowa, Kalona, Iowa, Walcott, Iowa, Washington, Iowa, Wilton, Iowa, Brimfield, Illinois, Buffalo Prairie, Illinois, Joy, Illinois, Monmouth, Illinois, Peoria, Illinois, Roscoe, Illinois and Beloit, Wisconsin. The Galesburg, Brimfield, Monmouth and Peoria locations operate under the F&M Bank name which incorporates branding as a division of CBI Bank & Trust.

Over the years, the bank has consistently been one of the largest financial institutions in its home market of Muscatine County, Iowa. Local deposit market share there has traditionally been in the high 20% to low 30% range, with slight variations from year to year.

== Products & Services ==
CBI Bank & Trust offers a full range of banking products and services including checking, savings and money market accounts; CDs, IRAs and related investments; personal, auto, consumer and home equity loans; conventional, insured and first-time homebuyer mortgages; business, commercial and ag loans; commercial deposit and cash management products; remote deposit capture and merchant processing services; online banking, online bill pay, mobile and telephone banking services; ATM, debit, credit, HSA and gift cards; automated teller machines, drive up and night deposit services; stocks, mutual funds, annuities and investment advisory services (through its affiliates, CBI Investment Services and F&M Investment Services); and trust services.

It hosts several bank clubs, most notably the Ambassador Club, open to customers age 50 and better with qualifying banking relationships, and the Mini-Millionaires Club, developed to help children age 12 and under develop good savings and money habits.

== Community Involvement ==
The organization places a high priority on good corporate citizenship in the form of community involvement and philanthropic efforts. Bank officers serve in leadership capacities, on boards, and on committees for a wide range of organizations in its trade area. Employees are encouraged to volunteer their time and efforts to support local civic and charitable causes.

Charitable giving is consistent, significant, and encompasses both traditional corporate donations as well as some unique approaches to funding. Nontraditional programs include a number of sports-related donation efforts tied to local high school teams, and Hometown Hundreds where tens of thousands of dollars has been donated over the years in the form of $100-per-week payments to a wide variety of local charities and programs nominated by the public.

== Memberships & Affiliations ==
Bank affiliations include membership in the American Bankers Association, the Iowa Bankers Association, the Illinois Bankers Association, the SHAZAM electronic funds transfer network, the National Automated Clearing House Association (NACHA), the Federal Deposit Insurance Corporation, the Federal Reserve System, and the Federal Home Loan Bank System.
