= Clarence Frauenthal House =

Historic house in Arkansas, United States

- U.S. National Register of Historic Places
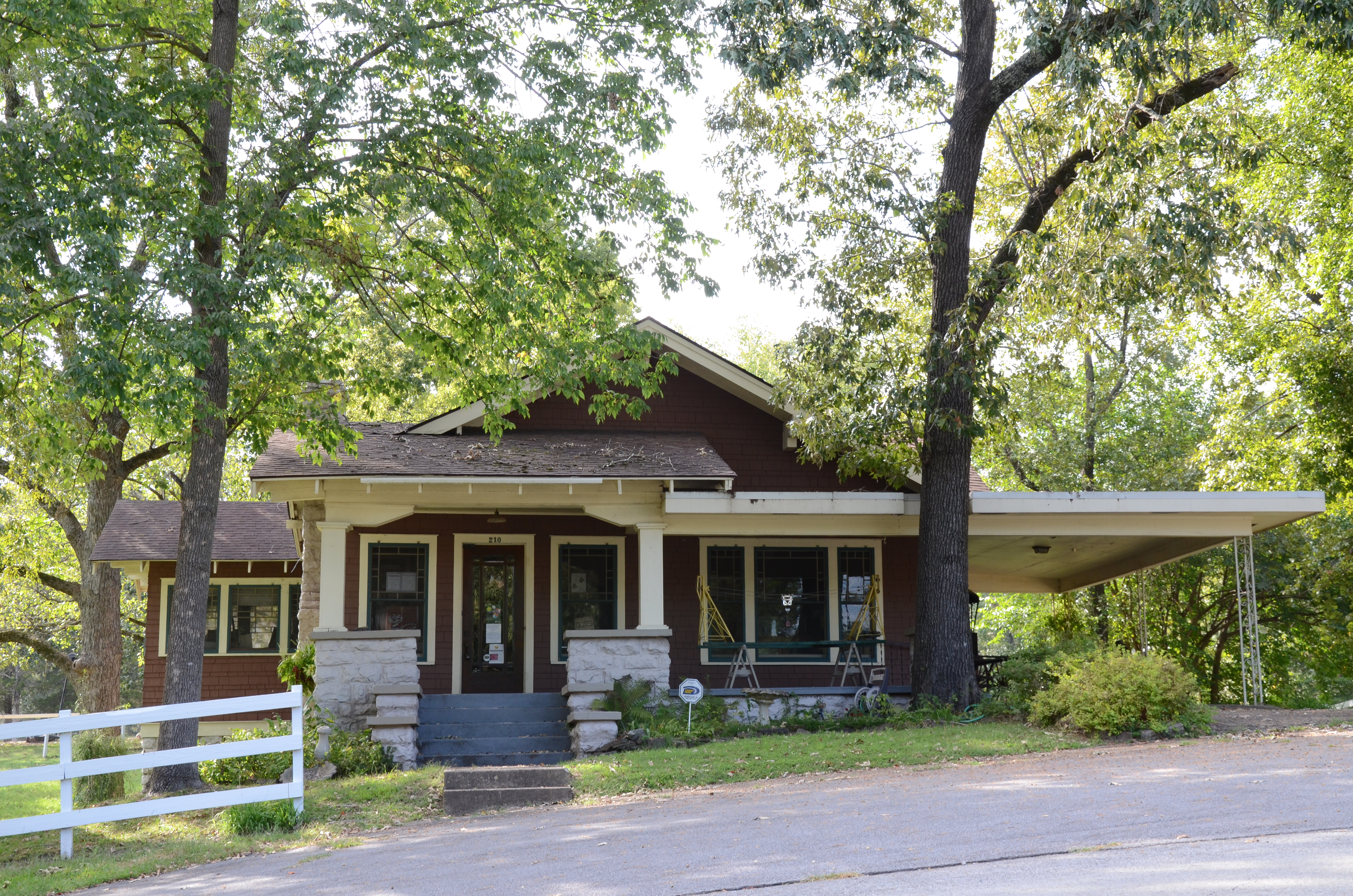

- Location within Arkansas Location within the United States
- Location: 210 N. Broadway St., Heber Springs, Arkansas
- Coordinates: 35°29′36″N 92°1′40″W
- Area: less than one acre
- Built: 1914
- Architectural style: Bungalow/craftsman
- NRHP reference No.: 93001256
- Added to NRHP: November 19, 1993

The Clarence Frauenthal House is a historic house at 210 North Broadway in Heber Springs, Arkansas. Clarence was a son of Heber Springs founder, Max Frauenthal. It is a single-story wood-frame structure, with a gabled roof, redwood siding, and a sandstone foundation. The main roof has its gable to the front, with a number of side gables, one of which extends to a flat-roofed porte-cochere on the right, another, extends one roof face forward over the front entry porch, and a third covers a projecting side ell. The front porch is supported by square posts, and shows exposed rafters. The house was built in 1914, and is Heber Springs' best example of Craftsman architecture. The house was listed on the U.S. National Register of Historic Places in 1993. Upon the death of Clarence's son Julian, the home was sold to the Cleburne County Historical Society; in 2017 the Historical Society sold the home to Clarence's grandson Max Don.

== See also ==
- National Register of Historic Places listings in Cleburne County, Arkansas
