= Farmers and Merchants Bank (Geneva, New York) =

Historic commercial building in New York, United States

- U.S. National Register of Historic Places
- U.S. Historic district – Contributing property
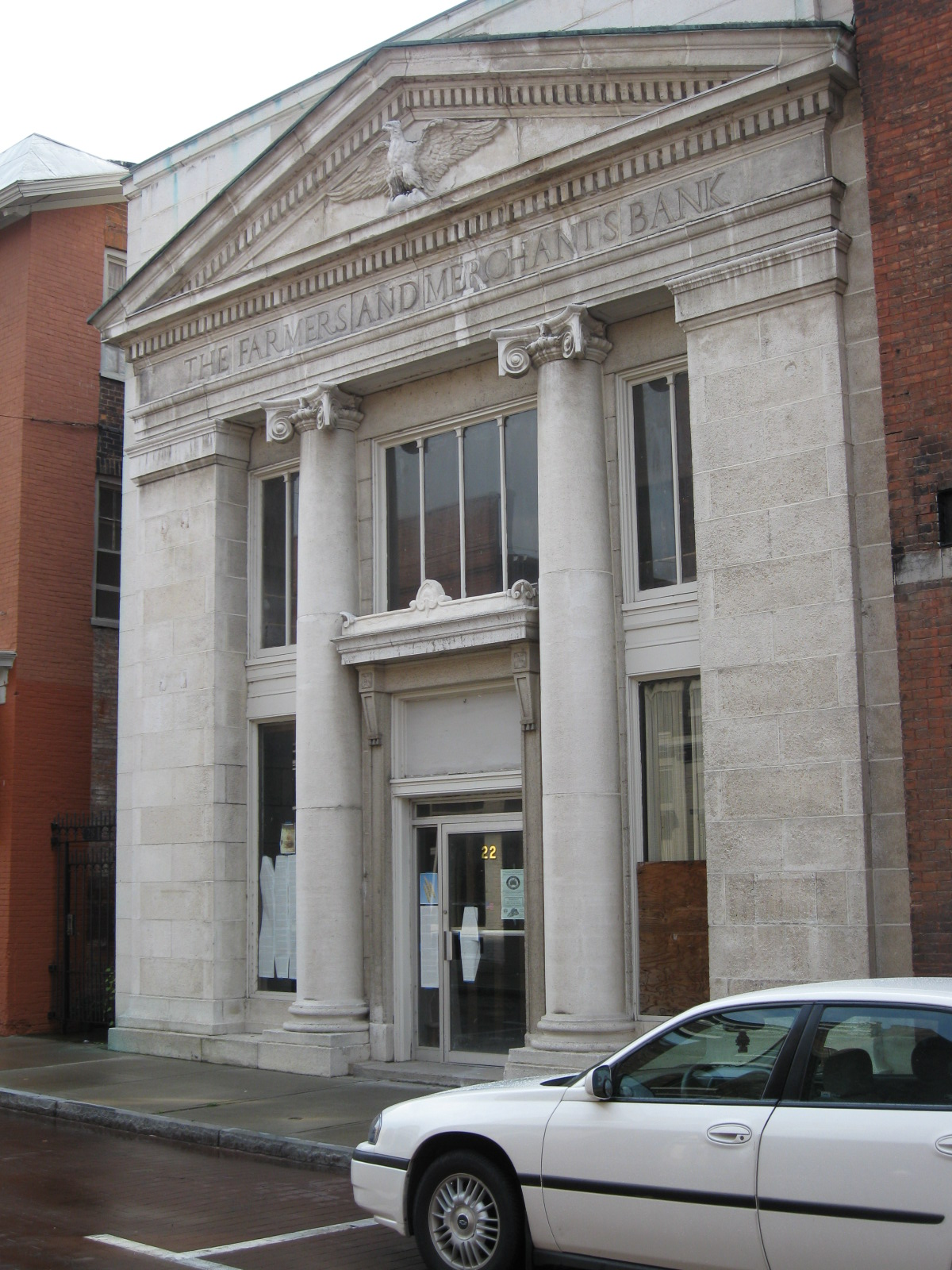
- Farmers and Merchants Bank, August 2009

- Location within New York Location within the United States
- Location: 24-26 Linden St., Geneva, New York
- Coordinates: 42°52′3″N 76°59′2″W
- Area: less than one acre
- Built: 1914
- Architectural style: Classical Revival
- NRHP reference No.: 08000102
- Added to NRHP: February 28, 2008

Farmers and Merchants Bank, also known as Geneva Savings Bank, is a historic bank building located at Geneva in Ontario County, New York. It was constructed in 1914–1915 and is a 2 1/2-story, three-bay brick building with a cast stone facade. The facade embodies a full range of Neoclassical features derived from ancient Greek architecture that were meant to convey a sense of integrity, durability, and reliability to the venerable financial institution of public banking.

It was listed on the National Register of Historic Places in 2008. It is located in the Geneva Commercial Historic District.
