= Farmers and Mechanics Bank (Georgetown) =

- U.S. National Historic Landmark District – Contributing property
- D.C. Inventory of Historic Sites
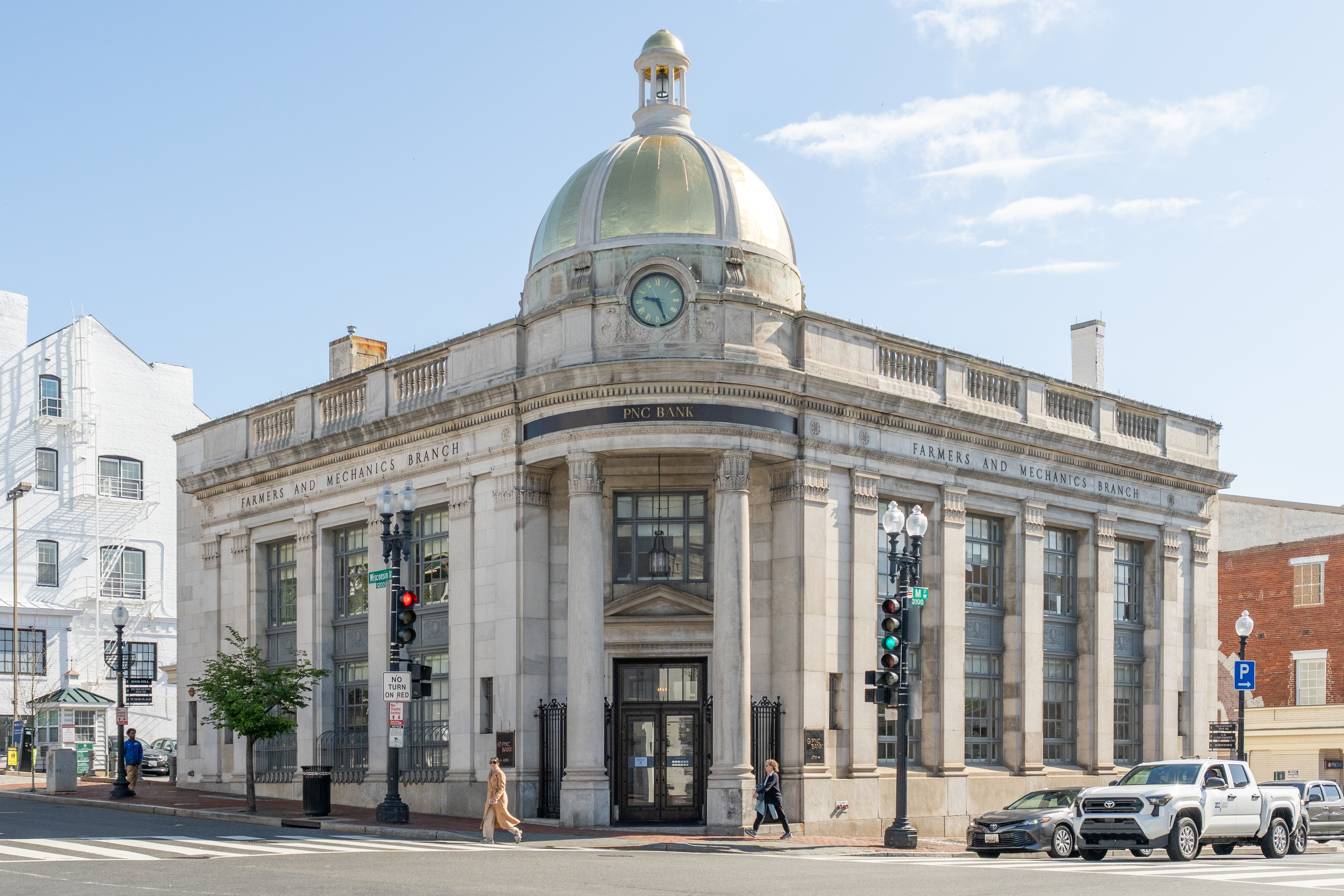
- Farmers and Mechanics Bank in 2026
- Location: M Street and Wisconsin Avenue, Georgetown, Washington, D.C.
- Coordinates: 38°54′19.4″N 77°03′45.2″W
- Built: 1922; 104 years ago
- Architectural style: Neoclassical
- Part of: Georgetown Historic District (ID67000025)
- MPS: Banks and Financial Institutions of Washington, D.C.

Significant dates
- Designated NHLDCP: May 28, 1967
- Designated DCIHS: November 8, 1964

The Farmers and Mechanics Bank is a historic building in the Georgetown neighborhood of Washington, D.C. Constructed between 1921 and 1922, the bank was first the headquarters of the Farmers and Mechanics National Bank. Soon thereafter, it became known as the Farmers and Mechanics Branch of Riggs National Bank. In 2005, the building became a branch of PNC bank.

== History ==
In 1814, the Farmers and Mechanics National Bank was established by George Corbin Washington and Romulus Riggs at the intersection of M Street and 31st Street. The bank decided to move its headquarters to the intersection of M Street and Wisconsin Avenue, and constructed the present building between 1921 and 1922, across the street from the Potomac Savings Bank. The building occupied the spot of the former O'Donnell's Drug Store.

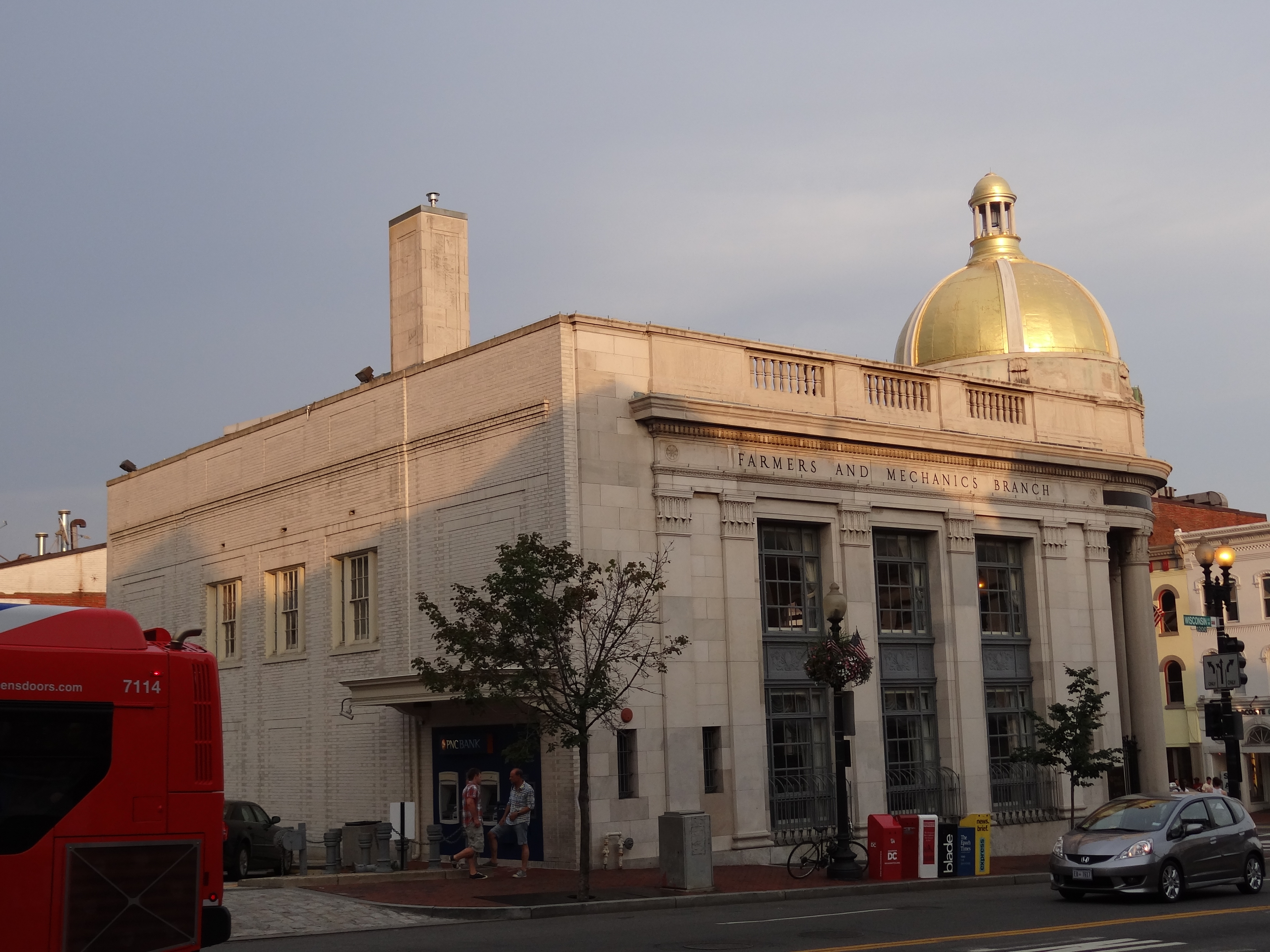
Side and rear of the bank

In 1928, the Farmers and Mechanics National Bank was acquired by Riggs Bank and the Georgetown location was thenceforth known as the Farmers and Mechanics Branch of Riggs National Bank, which name was inscribed atop the building. The dome and cupola atop the rounded corner portico were gilded with gold leaf in 1961 and remains so today.

With the designation of the Georgetown Historic District as a National Historic Landmark District on May 28, 1967, the Farmers and Mechanics Bank in Georgetown became a contributing property.

In 1985, Riggs Bank decided to restore many of its historic bank buildings, including the Georgetown location, returning the interior, which had been extensively remodeled over the years, to more closely model its original design. The neoclassical façade was also refurbished.

When Riggs Bank was acquired by PNC in 2005, ownership of the Georgetown bank was transferred and it began operating as a branch of PNC.
