= Washington County Transit =

Bus system in Washington County, Maryland, U.S.

- Headquarters: 1000 West Washington Street
- Locale: Hagerstown, Maryland
- Service area: Washington County, Maryland
- Service type: bus service, paratransit
- Routes: 14
- Website: www.washco-md.net

Washington County Transit (WCT), formerly County Commuter, is the primary provider of mass transportation in Washington County, Maryland. The agency operates 14 routes from Monday through Saturday. Total ridership averages 516,000 passenger trips annually.

== Fares ==
Washington County Transit operates on a fixed fare. This is $1.25 USD for adults, $0.95 or $0.60 for seniors (peak and non-peak hours), $0.85 for students, and free for children under 5. The agency also uses passes and ride cards.

== Route list ==
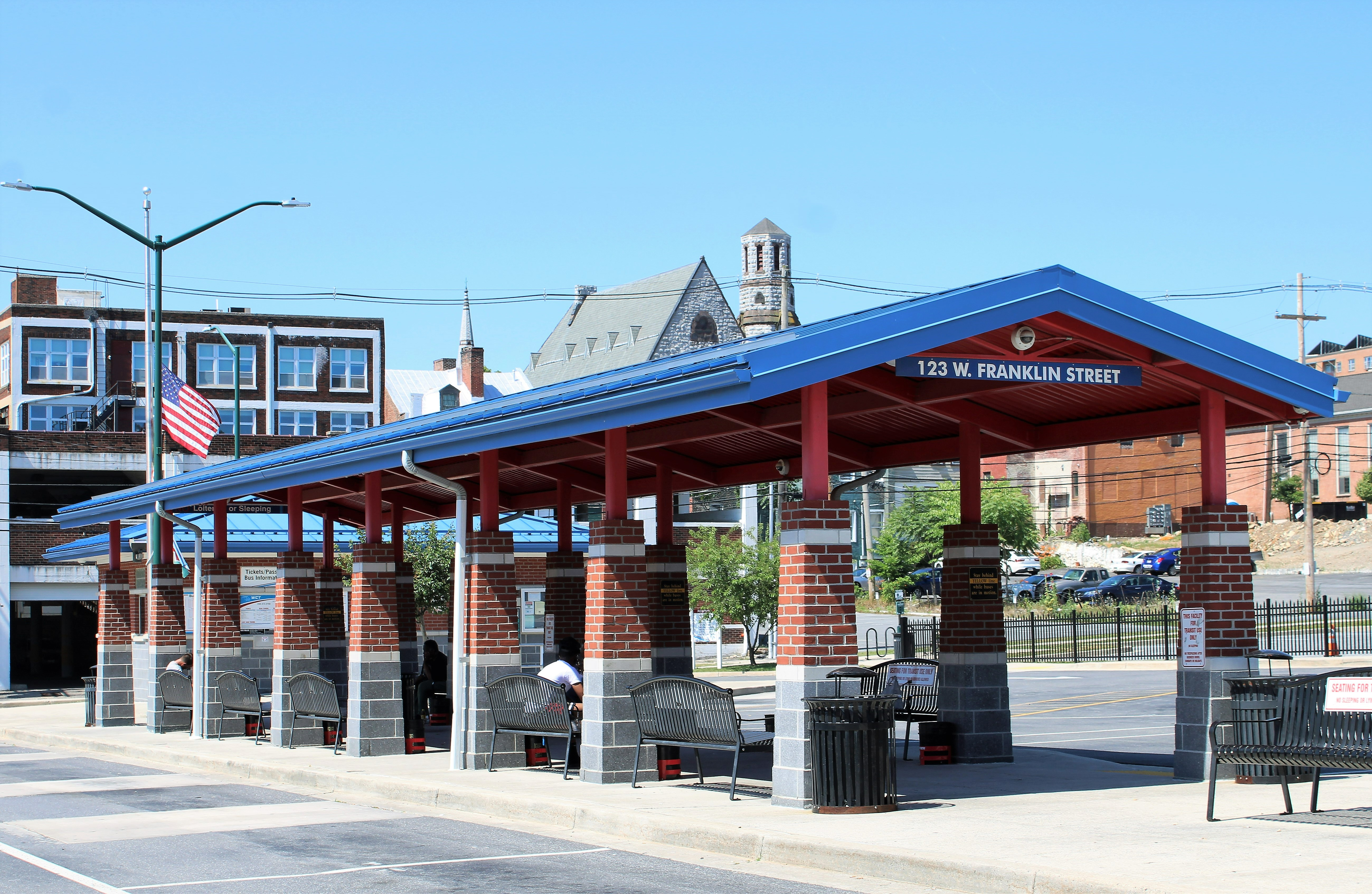
Washington County Transit Center in Hagerstown, Maryland

WCT operates the following routes:

- 111-Valley Mall
- 112-Valley Mall Express
- 113-Valley Mall Night Run
- 114-Long Meadow Night Run
- 116-Long Meadow via Locust
- 117-Long Meadow via Eastern
- 221-Robinwood
- 222-Smithsburg (Monday-Friday)
- 223-Smithsburg (Saturday)
- 331-Funkstown
- 333-West End
- 441-Williamsport
- 443-Maugansville
- 552-Premium Outlets
