= Farmers and Merchants Bank =

Farmers and Merchants Bank (sometimes abbreviated as F&M Bank) may refer to:

- Farmers and Merchants Bank-Masonic Lodge, Booneville, Arkansas, listed on the National Register of Historic Places (NRHP)
- Farmers and Merchants Bank (Mountain View, Arkansas), NRHP-listed
- Farmers and Merchants Bank of Fullerton, Fullerton, California, NRHP-listed in Orange County
- Farmers and Merchants Bank of Los Angeles, California
- Farmers and Merchants Bank Building (Idaho Falls, Idaho), NRHP-listed in Bonneville County
- Farmers and Merchants Bank (Nampa, Idaho), NRHP-listed
- Farmers and Merchants Savings Bank (Grand Mound, Iowa), NRHP-listed
- Old Farmers and Merchants State Bank, Ocean Springs, Mississippi, NRHP-listed in Jackson County
- Farmers and Merchants Bank Building (Monroe City, Missouri), NRHP-listed
- Farmers and Merchants State Bank (Eureka, Montana), NRHP-listed
- Farmer's and Merchant's Bank Building (Red Cloud, Nebraska), NRHP-listed
- Farmers and Merchants Bank (Geneva, New York), NRHP-listed
- Farmers and Merchants Bank (Chouteau, Oklahoma), NRHP-listed in Mayes County
- Farmers and Merchants National Bank (Hennessey, Oklahoma), NRHP-listed in Kingfisher County
- Farmers and Merchants Bank of Western Pennsylvania, Kittanning, Pennsylvania
- Farmers and Merchants Bank Building (Eastover, South Carolina), NRHP-listed
- Farmers and Merchants Bank (South Dakota), later known as Great Western Bank
- Farmers and Merchants Bank Building (White Bluff, Tennessee), NRHP-listed in Dickson County
- F&M Bank (Timberville, Virginia)
- Farmers and Merchants Bank (Baraboo, Wisconsin), NRHP listed
- Farmers and Merchants Union Bank (Columbus, Wisconsin), NRHP-listed

== See also ==
- Farmers and Mechanics Bank (disambiguation)
