= United States Post Office (Geneva, New York) =

- US Post Office-Geneva
- U.S. National Register of Historic Places
- U.S. Historic district – Contributing property
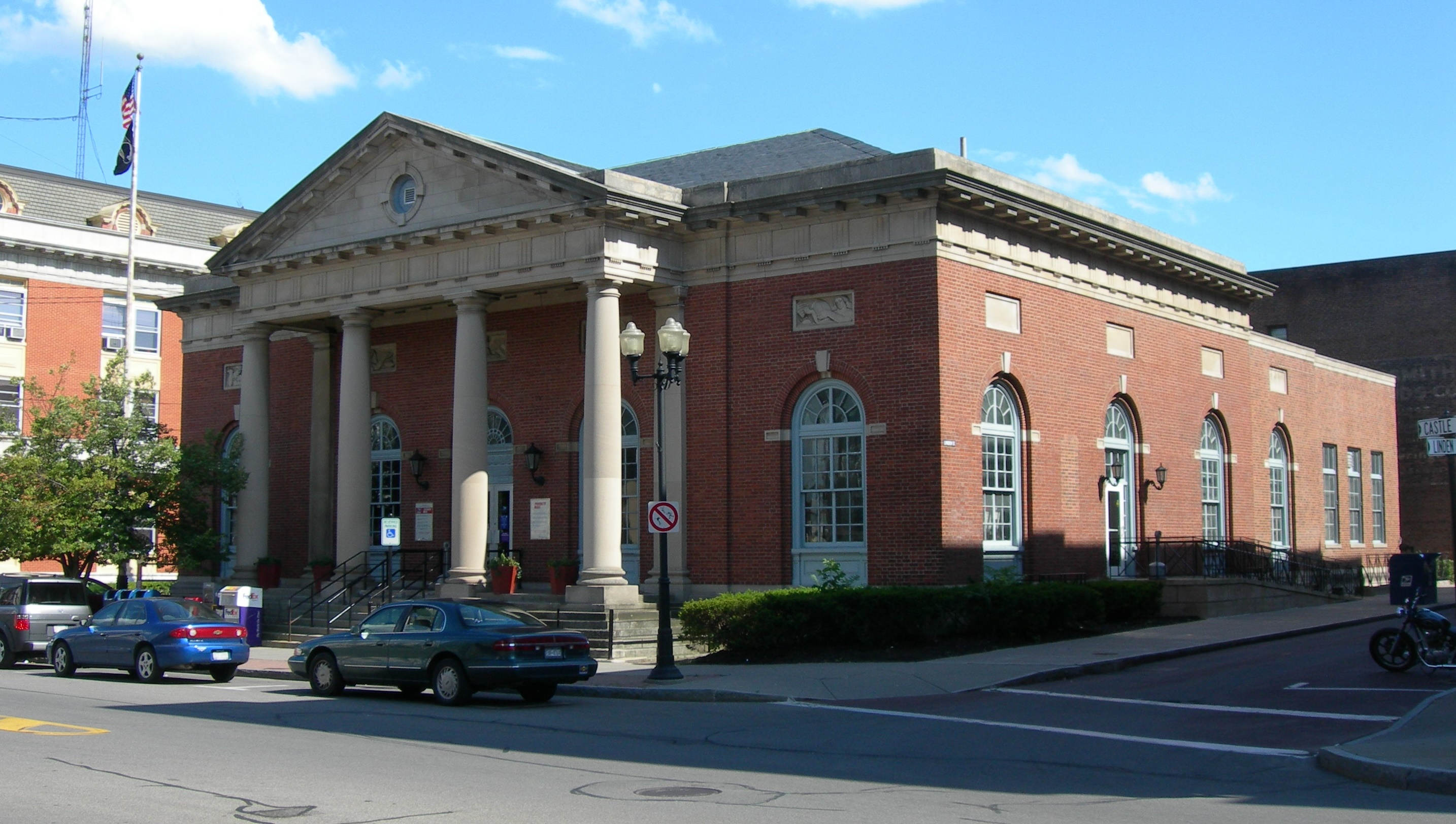
- U.S. Post Office, Geneva NY, July 2008

- Location within New York Location within the United States
- Interactive map showing the location for U.S. Post Office-Geneva
- Location: 67 Castle St., Geneva, New York
- Coordinates: 42°52′3″N 76°59′7″W
- Area: less than one acre
- Built: 1905
- Architect: Taylor, James Knox; Simon, Louis A.
- Architectural style: Colonial Revival
- MPS: US Post Offices in New York State, 1858-1943, TR
- NRHP reference No.: 88002523
- Added to NRHP: May 11, 1989

US Post Office—Geneva is a historic post office building located at Geneva in Ontario County, New York. It is a symmetrically massed one story structure faced with red brick and trimmed in limestone. It was constructed in 1905-1906 and is the first post office constructed in New York state in the Colonial Revival style. It is one of 13 post offices in New York State designed by the Office of the Supervising Architect of the Treasury Department under James Knox Taylor. The entrance portico features four Doric columns supporting a full Doric entablature and pediment with an oculus in its tympanum. The interior features a mural titled "The Vineyard" by Peter Blume and installed in 1942.

It was listed on the National Register of Historic Places in 1989. It is located in the Geneva Commercial Historic District.
