= Farmers State Bank (Adams, Nebraska) =

- U.S. National Register of Historic Places
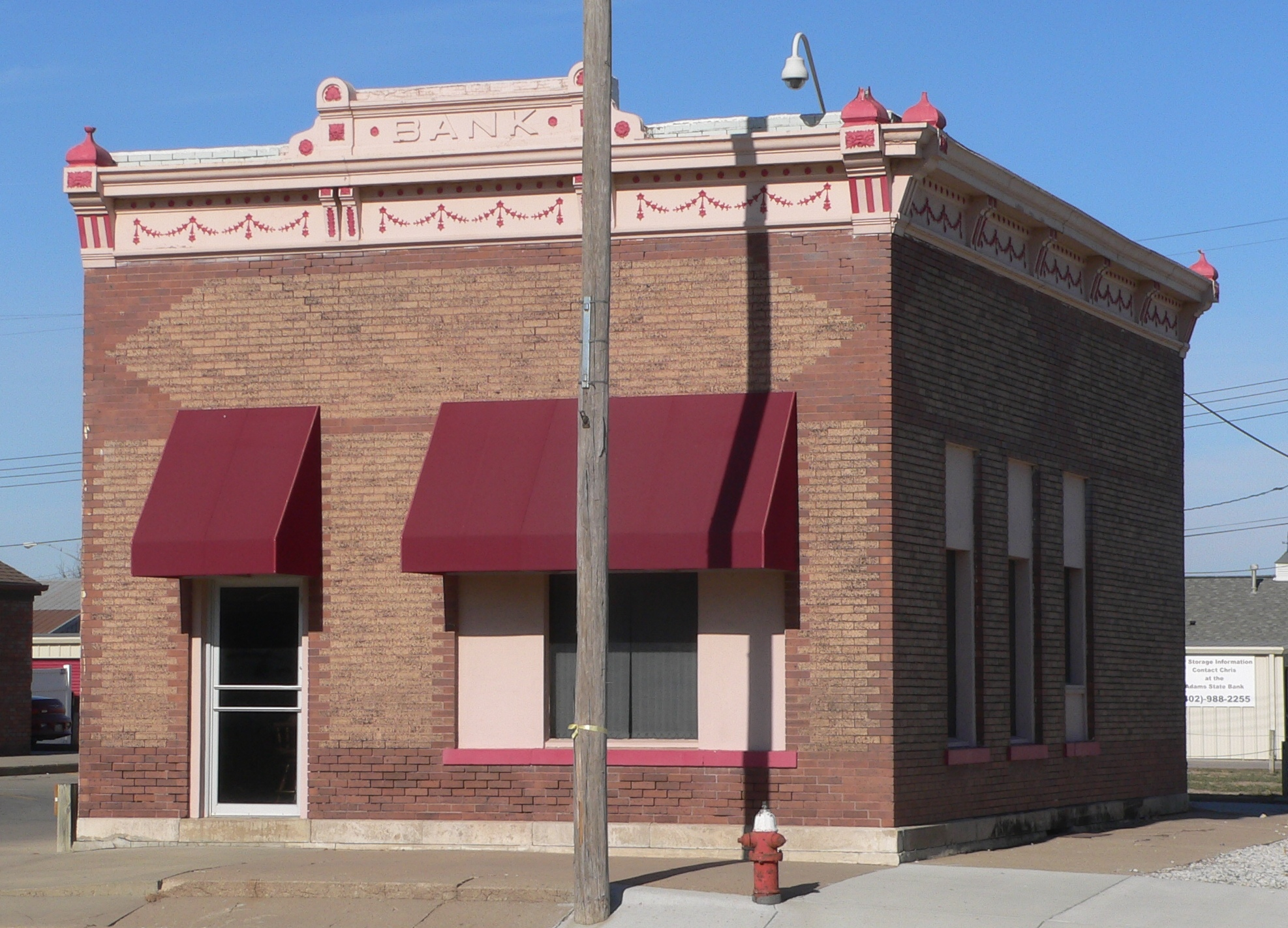
- The two principal facades, in 2012

- Location within Nebraska Location within the United States
- Location: 601 Main, Adams, Nebraska
- Coordinates: 40°27′35″N 96°30′29″W
- Area: less than one acre
- Built: 1908
- Architectural style: Renaissance
- NRHP reference No.: 92000702
- Added to NRHP: June 11, 1992

The Farmers State Bank, at 601 Main in Adams, Nebraska, was built in 1908. It served as a bank from 1908 to 1936 and then served as a post office. It was listed on the National Register of Historic Places in 1992.

It was deemed significant architecturally "as a good example of a small town bank, a characteristic type in Nebraska", having "two principle [sic] facades that displayed fine materials and dignified styling", and was judged to be the best surviving early 20th century commercial structure in Adams.

In 1992, the building was used as a dentist's office.
