= Frauenthal House (Conway, Arkansas) =

Historic house in Arkansas, United States

- U.S. National Register of Historic Places
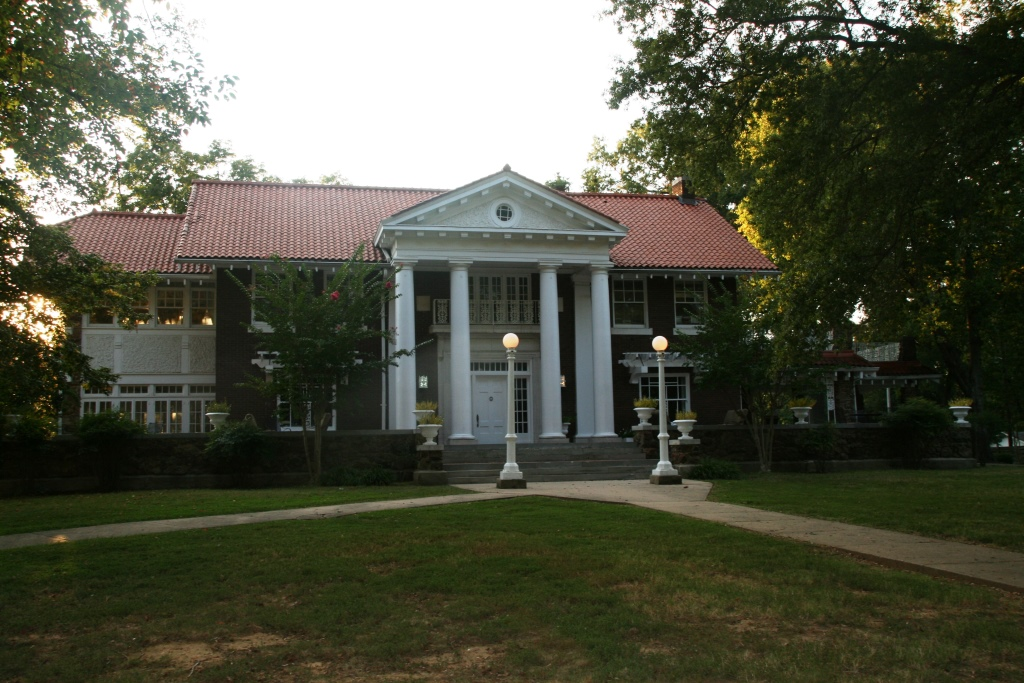

- Location within Arkansas Location within the United States
- Location: 631 Western, Conway, Arkansas
- Coordinates: 35°5′14″N 92°27′28″W
- Area: less than one acre
- Built: 1913
- Architect: Charles L. Thompson
- Architectural style: Colonial Revival, Georgian Revival
- MPS: Thompson, Charles L., Design Collection TR
- NRHP reference No.: 82000814
- Added to NRHP: December 22, 1982

The Frauenthal House is a historic house in Conway, Arkansas. It was designed by Charles L. Thompson and built in 1913, exhibiting a combination of Colonial Revival, Georgian Revival, and Craftsman styling. It is a two-story brick building, topped by a gabled tile roof with exposed rafter ends in the eaves. A Classical portico shelters the entrance, with four Tuscan columns supporting an entablature and full pedimented and dentillated gable. The 5,000-square-foot (460 m^{2}) house, with 22 rooms, was built for Jo and Ida Baridon Frauenthal and is currently occupied by the Conway Regional Health Foundation.

The house was listed on the U.S. National Register of Historic Places in 1982.

== See also ==
- Frauenthal & Schwarz Building, Conway, Arkansas, also associated with Charles L. Thompson and related firms and NRHP-listed
- Frauenthal House (Little Rock, Arkansas), also Charles L. Thompson-designed and NRHP-listed
