= F&M Bank (Timberville, Virginia) =

American community bank

- Company type: Subsidiary
- Traded as: OTCQX: FMBM
- Industry: Financial services
- Founded: 1908
- Headquarters: Timberville, VA, United States
- Number of locations: 14
- Area served: Virginia
- Key people: Mike Wilkerson; Barton Black; Mike Pugh
- Parent: F&M Bank Corp.
- Website: www.fmbankva.com

F&M Bank is a Timberville, Virginia based community bank. The bank was chartered on April 15, 1908, as a state chartered bank and was incorporated in 1983 as a one-bank holding company in Virginia. F&M Bank functions as a regulated financial institution, but provides commercial banking services to small and medium-size businesses, nonprofits, as well as families and individuals in Virginia’s Shenandoah Valley.

It operates as a subsidiary of F&M Bank Corp that provides retail, commercial, and municipal banking services.

== History ==
The history of F&M Bank can be traced to 1908, when it started its operation as a state chartered bank in Timberville as Farmers & Merchants Bank of Timberville, Inc. In 1983, F&M Bank was incorporated in Virginia and became a registered bank holding company. It maintains its headquarters in Timberville, VA and is a full-service financial institution, offering complete consumer, business, and financial services. F&M is the oldest and the only publicly traded corporation based in Rockingham County, VA.

Regional branch office locations of the bank are located in Bridgewater, Craigsville, Edinburg, Elkton, Grottoes, Luray, Staunton, Harrisonburg and Broadway and these offices share operational responsibility for retail operations and ATMs.

== Operations ==
The bank focuses on traditional community banking activities, taking deposits and making loans. The bank originates loans for marketplace lenders and processes payments. As of December 2017, the bank had grown to over $750 million in assets and more than 160 employees.

== Services ==
The bank offers direct lending and marketplace lending processed through different peer-to-peer lending portals.

=== Lending ===
F&M Bank was founded to provide assistance to individuals in low wealth communities, including entrepreneurs and existing businesses. The Bank’s loans have helped multiple nonprofit organizations and businesses with cash management services intended to increase administrative and operational efficiency in the region.

== Acquisitions ==
In 2017, F&M Bank acquired Valley Southern Title, an insurance company based in Harrisonburg, VA.

== Community involvement ==
Through its community programs, F&M Bank has formed partnerships with local community-based organizations and corporations in Virginia.
