= Frauenthal House (Little Rock, Arkansas) =

Historic house in Arkansas, United States

- U.S. National Register of Historic Places
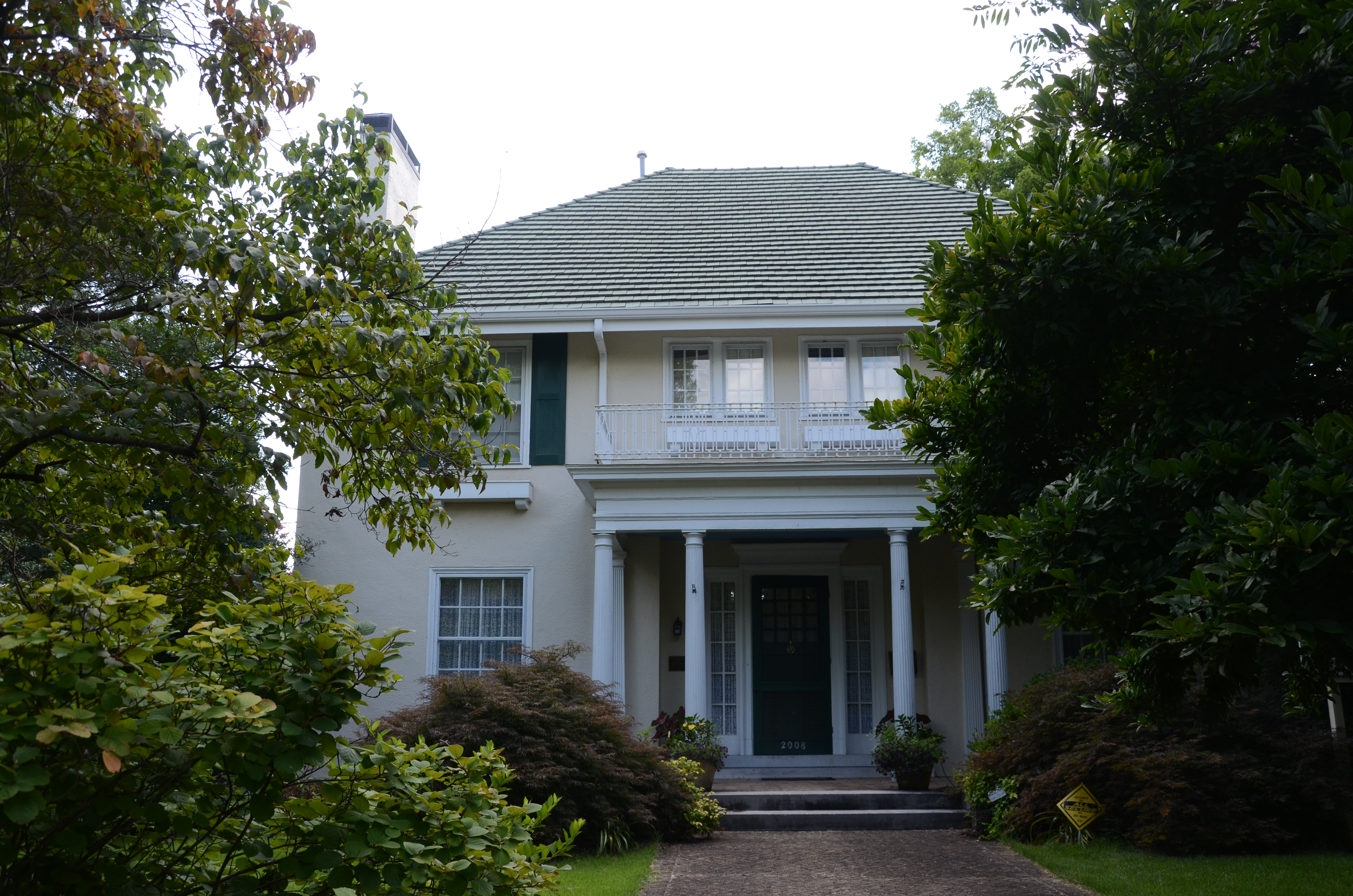

- Location within Arkansas Location within the United States
- Location: 2008 Arch St., Little Rock, Arkansas
- Coordinates: 34°43′45″N 92°16′48″W
- Area: less than one acre
- Built: 1919
- Architect: Thompson & Harding
- Architectural style: Colonial Revival, Late 19th and 20th Century Revivals, Mediterranean Revival
- MPS: Thompson, Charles L., Design Collection TR
- NRHP reference No.: 82000895
- Added to NRHP: December 22, 1982

The Frauenthal House is a historic house in Little Rock, Arkansas. It is a two-story stuccoed structure, three bays wide, with a terra cotta hip roof. Its front entry is sheltered by a Colonial Revival portico, supported by fluted Doric columns and topped by an iron railing. The entrance has a half-glass door and is flanked by sidelight windows. It was designed in 1919 by Thompson & Harding and built for Charles Frauenthal.

The house was listed on the U.S. National Register of Historic Places (NRHP) in 1982.

== See also ==
- Frauenthal House (Conway, Arkansas), another Thompson design
- National Register of Historic Places listings in Little Rock, Arkansas
