= Frauenthal & Schwarz Building =

- U.S. National Register of Historic Places
- U.S. Historic district – Contributing property
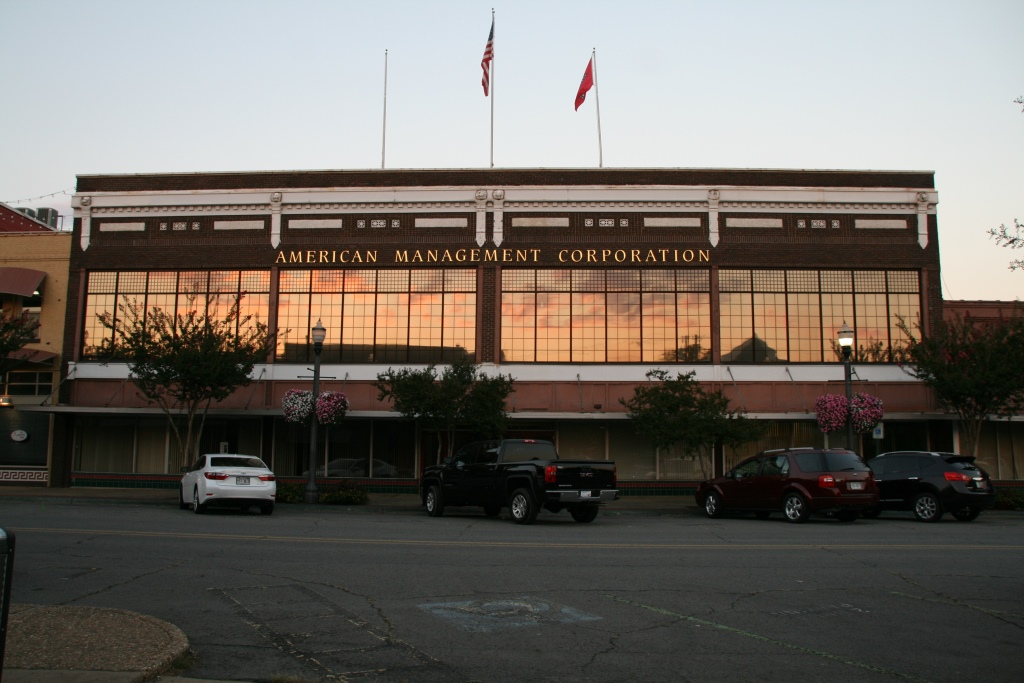

- Location within Arkansas Location within the United States
- Location: 824 Front St., Conway, Arkansas
- Coordinates: 35°5′29″N 92°26′27″W
- Area: less than one acre
- Built: 1925
- Architect: Sanders & Ginocchio
- Architectural style: Late 19th and 20th Century Revivals, Chicago, The Commercial Style
- Part of: Conway Commercial Historic District (ID10000779)
- NRHP reference No.: 92000956

Significant dates
- Added to NRHP: October 23, 1992
- Designated CP: September 23, 2010

The Frauenthal & Schwarz Building, also known as the Front Street Mall. is a historic commercial building at 824 Front Street in Conway, Arkansas. It was designed by architects Sanders & Ginocchio and built in 1925 as a major expansion and renovation of an 1879 building. It is a two-story structure, built of brick, steel, and concrete. Its ground floor storefront consists of plate glass windows and two double-leaf doorways, sheltered by a flat metal overhang. The upper floor has four groups of six windows, each consisting of larger-paned sections topped by smaller-paned ones. A decorative cornice with Mediterranean touches and flattened Italianate brackets extends above them. The building is one of the city's architecturally finest surviving commercial structures of the 1920s, designed by a prominent firm.

The building was listed on the U.S. National Register of Historic Places in 1992.

== See also ==
- Frauenthal House (Conway, Arkansas), also designed by Charles L. Thompson and related firms and NRHP-listed
