= First State Bank =

First State Bank or First State Bank Building may refer to several institutions and structures in the United States:

== Bank systems ==
- First State Bank (Nebraska), now Dayspring Bank, a regional community bank system
- First State Bank(Loomis, Nebraska), a subsidiary of Lauritzen Corporation

== Bank buildings ==
Alphabetical by state, then town

- First State Bank of Manlius, Illinois, listed on the National Register of Historic Places (NRHP)
- First State Bank (Edna, Kansas), NRHP-listed
- Mitchell Building-First State Bank Building, Barbourville, Kentucky, NRHP-listed
- First State Bank of Le Roy, Minnesota, NRHP-listed
- First State Bank (St. Joseph, Minnesota), NRHP-listed
- First State Bank of Chester, Montana, NRHP-listed
- First State Bank, Dowling and Emhoff Buildings, Stevensville, Montana, NRHP-listed in Ravalli County
- First State Bank of Bethany, Lincoln, Nebraska, NRHP-listed in Lancaster County
- First State Bank of Buxton, North Dakota, NRHP-listed
- First State Bank of Indiahoma, Oklahoma, NRHP-listed in Comanche County
- First State Bank of Maramec, Oklahoma, NRHP-listed in Pawnee County
- First State Bank (Shattuck, Oklahoma), NRHP-listed in Ellis County
- First State Bank of Hazel, South Dakota, NRHP-listed
- First State Bank Building (Revillo, South Dakota), NRHP-listed
- First State Bank and Trust Building, Bryan, Texas, NRHP-listed in Brazos County
- First State Bank of Baggs, Wyoming, NRHP-listed
- Carey Block, also known as First State Bank of Greybull, Wyoming, NRHP-listed
