= 2020 United States presidential election in Tennessee =

- November 3, 2020
- Turnout: 69.30% (▲7.38 pp)

Nominee	Donald Trump	Joe Biden
Party	Republican	Democratic
Home state	Florida	Delaware
Running mate	Mike Pence	Kamala Harris
Electoral vote	11	0
Popular vote	1,852,475	1,143,711
Percentage	60.66%	37.45%

Trump
40–50%
50–60%
60–70%
70–80%
80–90%
90–100%
Biden
40–50%
50–60%
60–70%
70–80%
80–90%
90–100%
Tie/No data
President before election
Donald Trump
Republican
Elected President
Joe Biden
Democratic

The 2020 United States presidential election in Tennessee was held on Tuesday, November 3, 2020, as part of the 2020 United States presidential election in which all 50 states plus the District of Columbia participated. Tennessee voters chose electors to represent them in the Electoral College via a popular vote, pitting the Republican Party's nominee, incumbent President Donald Trump, and running mate Vice President Mike Pence against Democratic Party nominee, former Vice President Joe Biden, and his running mate California Senator Kamala Harris. Tennessee has 11 electoral votes in the Electoral College.

Prior to the election, all major news organizations once again considered Tennessee a safe or likely red state; the state has voted Republican in every presidential election since 2000, including by double-digit margins since 2004.

Trump won Tennessee with 60.66% of the vote, almost tied with his 60.72% vote share in 2016. Despite this, Biden got 37.45% of the vote, three points better than Hillary Clinton. Prior to the election, all 17 news organizations considered this a state Trump would win, or a safe red state. Tennessee has not supported a Democrat for president since 1996.

Per exit polls by the Associated Press, Trump's strength in Tennessee came from a 69% showing among Southern whites, who made up 84% of the electorate. Similarly, Trump carried white born-again/Evangelical Christians by 86%–12%. The state of Tennessee is entirely covered in the Bible Belt.

The only strength Biden showed was with 88% of African American voters. Biden won 64.4% of the vote in Shelby County, Tennessee, (Note: Shelby County is home to Memphis, and is majority African-American.) the highest vote share in the county for the Democratic Party since 1944. 65% of voters opposed removing Confederate statues from public places in Tennessee, and these voters backed Trump by 83%–15%.

== Primary elections ==
=== Democratic primary ===
The Democratic primary was on March 3, 2020. Elizabeth Warren, Bernie Sanders, and former Vice President Joe Biden were among the major declared candidates. Former vice president Joe Biden easily decided the primary, winning almost 42% of the vote and 36 delegates and benefitting from overwhelming African-American support, as well as rural support among predominantly white working-class voters. Senator Bernie Sanders took 25% of the vote gaining 22 delegates, while former mayor Michael Bloomberg reached the threshold with slightly more than 15% but was not allocated any statewide delegates due to his withdrawal the next day. Otherwise Biden would have had 33 delegates, Sanders 20 delegates and Bloomberg 10 delegates. Senator Elizabeth Warren received a single district delegate.

Popular vote share by county Biden: 30–40% 40–50% 50–60% 60–70%; Sanders: 30–40%

2020 Tennessee Democratic presidential primary
Candidate	Votes	%	Delegates
Joe Biden	215,390	41.72	36 (Note: 33 delegates, if Bloomberg's statewide delegates would have been calculated.)
Bernie Sanders	129,168	25.02	22 (Note: 20 delegates, if Bloomberg's statewide delegates would have been calculated.)
Michael Bloomberg	79,789	15.46	5 (Note: 10 delegates, if Bloomberg's statewide delegates would have been calculated.)
Elizabeth Warren	53,732	10.41	1
Pete Buttigieg (withdrawn) (Note: Candidate withdrew shortly before the primary, after early voting started.)	17,102	3.31	
Amy Klobuchar (withdrawn)	10,671	2.07	
Tulsi Gabbard	2,278	0.44	
Tom Steyer (withdrawn)	1,932	0.37	
Michael Bennet (withdrawn)	1,650	0.32	
Andrew Yang (withdrawn)	1,097	0.21	
Cory Booker (withdrawn)	953	0.18	
Marianne Williamson (withdrawn)	498	0.10	
John Delaney (withdrawn)	378	0.07	
Julian Castro (withdrawn)	239	0.05	
Deval Patrick (withdrawn)	182	0.04	
Uncommitted	1,191	0.23	
Total	516,250	100%	64

=== Republican primary ===
The Republican primary was on March 3, 2020. Incumbent President Donald Trump won the state in a landslide getting 96.5% of the vote and all 58 delegates

Former Tennessee senator Bob Corker was considered a potential primary opponent for Trump.

Popular vote share by county Trump: >90%

2020 Tennessee Republican primary
Candidate	Votes	%	Estimated delegates
Donald Trump (incumbent)	384,266	96.47	58
Joe Walsh (withdrawn)	4,178	1.05	0
Bill Weld	3,922	0.98	0
Uncommitted	5,948	1.49	0
Total	398,314	100%	58

== General election ==
=== Predictions ===
Source	Ranking	As of
The Cook Political Report	Safe R	September 10, 2020
Inside Elections	Safe R	September 4, 2020
Sabato's Crystal Ball	Safe R	July 14, 2020
Politico	Safe R	September 8, 2020
RCP	Safe R	August 3, 2020
Niskanen	Safe R	July 26, 2020
CNN	Safe R	August 3, 2020
The Economist	Safe R	September 2, 2020
CBS News	Likely R	August 16, 2020
270towin	Safe R	August 2, 2020
ABC News	Safe R	July 31, 2020
NPR	Likely R	August 3, 2020
NBC News	Safe R	August 6, 2020
538	Safe R	September 9, 2020

=== Polling ===
View source data.

Aggregate polls

Source of poll aggregation	Dates administered	Dates updated	Joe Biden Democratic	Donald Trump Republican	Other/ Undecided (Note: Calculated by taking the difference of 100% and all other candidates combined.)	Margin
RealClearPolitics	Jan 28, 2020 – May 22, 2020	September 15, 2020	39.0%	53.0%	8.0%	Trump +14.0
FiveThirtyEight	until November 2, 2020	November 3, 2020	41.4%	55.1%	3.5%	Trump +13.7
Average			40.2%	54.1%	5.7%	Trump +13.9

Polls

Poll source	Date(s) administered	Sample size (Note: Key: A – all adults RV – registered voters LV – likely voters V – unclear)	Margin of error	Donald Trump Republican	Joe Biden Democratic	Jo Jorgensen Libertarian	Howie Hawkins Green	Other	Undecided
SurveyMonkey/Axios	Oct 20 – Nov 2, 2020	3,342 (LV)	± 2.5%	54% (Note: Overlapping sample with the previous SurveyMonkey/Axios poll, but more information available regarding sample size)	45%	–	–	–	–
Swayable	Oct 23 – Nov 1, 2020	485 (LV)	± 5.9%	58%	41%	1%	0%	–	–
SurveyMonkey/Axios	Oct 1–28, 2020	5,099 (LV)	–	56%	42%	–	–	–	–
SurveyMonkey/Axios	Sep 1–30, 2020	2,329 (LV)	–	58%	41%	–	–	–	2%
SurveyMonkey/Axios	Aug 1–31, 2020	1,796 (LV)	–	59%	40%	–	–	–	1%
SurveyMonkey/Axios	Jul 1–31, 2020	2,481 (LV)	–	61%	38%	–	–	–	2%
SurveyMonkey/Axios	Jun 8–30, 2020	1,092 (LV)	–	61%	37%	–	–	–	2%
SSRS/Vanderbilt University	May 5–22, 2020	1,000 (RV)	± 3.8%	51%	42%	–	–	5% (Note: "Someone else" and would not vote with 2%; "refused" with 1%)	2%
East Tennessee State University	Apr 22 – May 1, 2020	536 (LV)	–	53%	36%	–	–	6%	5%
Mason-Dixon	Jan 28–30, 2020	625 (RV)	± 4.0%	55%	39%	–	–	–	6%

Former candidates

Donald Trump vs. Michael Bloomberg

Poll source	Date(s) administered	Sample size	Margin of error	Donald Trump (R)	Michael Bloomberg (D)	Undecided
Mason-Dixon	Jan 28–30, 2020	625 (RV)	± 4.0%	54%	39%	7%

Donald Trump vs. Pete Buttigieg

Poll source	Date(s) administered	Sample size	Margin of error	Donald Trump (R)	Pete Buttigieg (D)	Undecided
Mason-Dixon	Jan 28–30, 2020	625 (RV)	± 4.0%	55%	38%	7%

Donald Trump vs. Bernie Sanders

Poll source	Date(s) administered	Sample size	Margin of error	Donald Trump (R)	Bernie Sanders (D)	Undecided
Mason-Dixon	Jan 28–30, 2020	625 (RV)	± 4.0%	57%	37%	6%

Donald Trump vs. Elizabeth Warren

Poll source	Date(s) administered	Sample size	Margin of error	Donald Trump (R)	Elizabeth Warren (D)	Undecided
Mason-Dixon	Jan 28–30, 2020	625 (RV)	± 4.0%	57%	36%	7%

=== Electoral slates ===
These slates of electors were nominated by each party in order to vote in the Electoral College should their candidates win the state:

Donald Trump and Mike Pence Republican Party	Joe Biden and Kamala Harris Democratic Party	Jo Jorgensen and Spike Cohen Libertarian Party	Kanye West and Michelle Tidball Independent	Don Blankenship and William Mohr Constitution Party	Howie Hawkins and Angela Nicole Walker Green Party	Alyson Kennedy and Malcom Jarrett Socialist Workers Party	Gloria La Riva and Sunil Freeman Party for Socialism and Liberation	Rocky De La Fuente and Darcy Richardson Alliance Party	Brian T. Carroll and Amar Patel American Solidarity Party	Jade Simmons and Claudeliah Roze Independent	Tom Hoefling and Andy Prior Independent	R19 Boddie and Eric Stoneham Independent	Kasey Wells and Rachel Wells Independent
Paul Chapman; Cindy Hatcher; Tina Benkiser; John Stanbery; Beverly Knight-Hurley; Mary Parks; Jim Looney; Kathy Bryson; Terry Roland; Scott Smith; Julia Atchley-Pace	Barbara Wagner; Maria Brewer; Mike Hampton; Meryl Rice; Madeline Rogero; Deborah Reed; Andrew Berke; Gale Carson; Charles Howard; Kevin Huddleston; Martha Shepard	Robert Hammett; Justin Cornett; David Tyler; Suzanne Eltz; Daniel Lewis; Joshua Eakle; Trisha Butler; Victoria Sexton; Jaron Weldner; Heather Scott; David Sexton	Breanna Sellars; LeeAnn Anderson; Sammantha Ashley; Clarissa Layne; Nicola La Mattina; Ricky Williams; Mike Magnusson; Rochelle Stevens; Nicholas Tatum; Isaac Ford; Newton Ford	Coal Lankston; Terri Coker; H. James Hepping; Laura Marquis; James Barlow; James Beck; Joan Castle; James Webb; Susan Lankston; Darrell Castle	Josh Berger; Martin Pleasant; Trevor Miles; Michael Principe; Elizabeth Dachowski; Leith Patton; Howard Switzer; Richard Griffith; James Maynard; Charles Owens; John Miglietta	Helen Wright; Jahaan Jones; Cordelious Johnson; Kristin Griffin; Mohd Nasan; Clark Harris; Keith Cherry; Erica Teel; Emily Dalerta; Jimmy Smartt; Celest Farmer	Victoria Hewlett; Daniel Castillo; James Baker; Lucas Byrd; Ronda Shelton; Janice Martin; Haley Rader; Cassy Morris; Kole Oakes; Sebastian Baltes; Zen Baltes	Karrie Davis; Kurt Davis; Marjorie Lloyd; Timothy Nelson; Heather Couch; Sue Litman; Jeffrey Lichterman; Steven Pitcairn; Molly Hoehn; Jonathan Etheridge; Starla Etheridge	Juan Villalba; Sarah Bourque; Robert Ritchey; Clinton Poston; Jonathan Sword; Caleb Poston; Nathan Warf; Heidi Scott; David Rogers; Patrick Harris; Sara Taylor	Olivia McCaughan; Reginald Jackson; Colin Nottage; Rebecca Murphy; Sherronda Broughton; Brittany Mansfield; Doris Littleton; Jamel Carter; Yolanda Roberson; Brittany Murphy; Candi Carter	Jesse Owenby; Paula Roffey; Alexander Ionnidis; Jamie Christley; Cecret Williams; David Schaffer; Bryan Davis; James Goodman; Josiah Weaver; Susan Davis; Tom Kovach	Preston Sprinkle; Fran Stidham; Ernestine Thomas; Amber Penny; Stephanie Frierson; Isiah Strafford; Debra Rainey; Jason Ballard; Brigitte Philmore; Joseph Frierson; Tamika Wright	Bettina Cohan; William Bowlin; Melissa Holloway; John Guigneaux; Tiffany Snow; Ashley Stone; Whitney Tucker; Matthew Brown; Lacoco Pirtle; Kim Moses; Kippie Lowry

=== Results ===
State Senate district results

State House district results

2020 United States presidential election in Tennessee
Party	Candidate	Votes	%	±%
Republican	Donald Trump Mike Pence	1,852,475	60.66%	−0.06%
Democratic	Joe Biden Kamala Harris	1,143,711	37.45%	+2.73%
Independent (Note: Jorgensen and Cohen were nominated by the Libertarian Party of Tennessee but placed on the ballot as independents because the party did not have ballot access.)	Jo Jorgensen Spike Cohen	29,877	0.98%	−1.83%
Independent	Kanye West Michelle Tidball	10,279	0.34%	N/A
Independent (Note: Blankenship and Mohr were nominated by the Constitution Party of Tennessee but placed on the ballot as independents because the party did not have ballot access.)	Don Blankenship William Mohr	5,365	0.18%	+0.12%
Independent (Note: Hawkins and Walker were nominated by the Green Party of Tennessee but placed on the ballot as independents because the party did not have ballot access.)	Howie Hawkins Angela Walker	4,545	0.15%	−0.49%
Independent (Note: Kennedy and Jarrett were nominated by the Socialist Workers Party but placed on the ballot as independents because the party did not have ballot access.)	Alyson Kennedy Malcolm Jarrett	2,576	0.08%	−0.04%
Independent (Note: La Riva and Freeman were nominated by the Party for Socialism and Liberation but placed on the ballot as independents because the party did not have ballot access.)	Gloria La Riva Sunil Freeman	2,301	0.08%	N/A
Independent (Note: De La Fuente and Richardson were nominated by the Alliance Party but placed on the ballot as independents because the party did not have ballot access.)	Rocky De La Fuente Darcy Richardson	1,860	0.06%	−0.10%
American Solidarity	Brian T. Carroll (write-in) Amar Patel (write-in)	762	0.02%	N/A
Independent	Jade Simmons (write-in) Claudeliah Roze (write-in)	68	0.00%	N/A
Independent	Tom Hoefling (write-in) Andy Prior (write-in)	31	0.00%	N/A
Independent	R19 Boddie (write-in) Eric Stoneham (write-in)	1	0.00%	N/A
Independent	Kasey Wells (write-in) Rachel Wells (write-in)	0	0.00%	N/A
Total votes		3,053,851	100.00%	
Republican hold				

==== By county ====
County	Donald Trump Republican		Joe Biden Democratic		Various candidates Other parties		Margin		Total
County	#	%	#	%	#	%	#	%	Total
Anderson	23,184	65.18%	11,741	33.01%	645	1.81%	11,443	32.17%	35,570
Bedford	14,354	75.20%	4,453	23.33%	281	1.47%	9,901	51.87%	19,088
Benton	5,668	78.07%	1,529	21.06%	63	0.87%	4,139	57.01%	7,260
Bledsoe	4,725	82.06%	971	16.86%	62	1.08%	3,754	65.20%	5,758
Blount	47,369	71.12%	17,932	26.92%	1,308	1.96%	29,437	44.20%	66,609
Bradley	35,204	76.76%	9,851	21.48%	810	1.76%	25,353	55.28%	45,865
Campbell	12,331	82.58%	2,441	16.35%	161	1.07%	9,890	66.23%	14,933
Cannon	5,190	79.15%	1,261	19.23%	106	1.62%	3,929	59.92%	6,557
Carroll	9,205	77.32%	2,559	21.50%	141	1.18%	6,646	55.82%	11,905
Carter	19,584	79.96%	4,529	18.49%	379	1.55%	15,055	61.47%	24,492
Cheatham	14,438	71.26%	5,514	27.22%	308	1.52%	8,924	44.04%	20,260
Chester	5,952	78.48%	1,412	18.62%	220	2.90%	4,540	59.86%	7,584
Claiborne	10,604	81.92%	2,202	17.01%	139	1.07%	8,402	64.91%	12,945
Clay	2,733	77.95%	735	20.96%	38	1.09%	1,998	56.99%	3,506
Cocke	12,162	81.85%	2,533	17.05%	164	1.10%	9,629	64.80%	14,859
Coffee	17,883	73.65%	5,705	23.49%	694	2.86%	12,178	50.16%	24,282
Crockett	4,673	76.43%	1,382	22.60%	59	0.97%	3,291	53.83%	6,114
Cumberland	25,168	77.97%	6,728	20.84%	383	1.19%	18,440	57.13%	32,279
Davidson	100,218	32.36%	199,703	64.49%	9,737	3.15%	−99,485	−32.13%	309,658
Decatur	4,229	80.69%	904	17.25%	108	2.06%	3,325	63.44%	5,241
DeKalb	6,672	78.37%	1,750	20.56%	91	1.07%	4,922	57.81%	8,513
Dickson	17,643	72.54%	6,106	25.10%	574	2.36%	11,537	47.44%	24,323
Dyer	11,768	78.04%	3,158	20.94%	153	1.02%	8,610	57.10%	15,079
Fayette	15,690	68.26%	7,027	30.57%	267	1.17%	8,663	37.69%	22,984
Fentress	7,441	85.24%	1,214	13.91%	74	0.85%	6,227	71.33%	8,729
Franklin	13,987	73.11%	4,864	25.42%	281	1.47%	9,123	47.69%	19,132
Gibson	16,259	72.80%	5,771	25.84%	305	1.36%	10,488	46.96%	22,335
Giles	9,784	74.10%	3,298	24.98%	121	0.92%	6,486	49.12%	13,203
Grainger	8,565	84.52%	1,467	14.48%	102	1.00%	7,098	70.04%	10,134
Greene	22,259	79.25%	5,199	18.51%	629	2.24%	17,060	60.74%	28,087
Grundy	4,802	82.02%	988	16.87%	65	1.11%	3,814	65.15%	5,855
Hamblen	18,811	76.37%	5,500	22.33%	320	1.30%	13,311	54.04%	24,631
Hamilton	92,108	53.83%	75,522	44.14%	3,483	2.03%	16,586	9.69%	171,113
Hancock	2,372	86.44%	362	13.19%	10	0.37%	2,010	73.25%	2,744
Hardeman	5,760	57.24%	4,180	41.54%	123	1.22%	1,580	15.70%	10,063
Hardin	9,559	82.85%	1,775	15.38%	204	1.77%	7,784	67.47%	11,538
Hawkins	20,405	82.20%	4,083	16.45%	336	1.35%	16,322	65.75%	24,824
Haywood	3,343	44.94%	4,012	53.93%	84	1.13%	−669	−8.99%	7,439
Henderson	9,797	81.51%	2,092	17.40%	131	1.09%	7,705	64.11%	12,020
Henry	11,239	74.69%	3,548	23.58%	260	1.73%	7,691	51.11%	15,047
Hickman	7,577	77.06%	2,130	21.66%	125	1.28%	5,447	55.40%	9,832
Houston	2,718	73.74%	871	23.63%	97	2.63%	1,847	50.11%	3,686
Humphreys	6,120	74.31%	2,017	24.49%	99	1.20%	4,103	49.82%	8,236
Jackson	4,118	77.36%	1,135	21.32%	70	1.32%	2,983	56.04%	5,323
Jefferson	18,651	78.98%	4,654	19.71%	311	1.31%	13,997	59.27%	23,616
Johnson	6,468	82.91%	1,246	15.97%	87	1.12%	5,222	66.94%	7,801
Knox	124,540	56.47%	91,422	41.45%	4,594	2.08%	33,118	15.02%	220,556
Lake	1,492	73.35%	526	25.86%	16	0.79%	966	47.49%	2,034
Lauderdale	5,674	63.29%	3,193	35.62%	98	1.09%	2,481	27.67%	8,965
Lawrence	15,334	81.92%	3,195	17.07%	189	1.01%	12,139	64.85%	18,718
Lewis	4,474	79.76%	1,072	19.11%	63	1.13%	3,402	60.65%	5,609
Lincoln	12,281	78.68%	2,919	18.70%	408	2.62%	9,362	59.98%	15,608
Loudon	21,713	73.99%	6,948	23.68%	686	2.33%	14,765	50.31%	29,347
Macon	8,096	85.34%	1,307	13.78%	84	0.88%	6,789	71.56%	9,487
Madison	23,943	55.75%	18,390	42.82%	617	1.43%	5,553	12.93%	42,950
Marion	9,911	74.77%	3,177	23.97%	168	1.26%	6,734	50.80%	13,256
Marshall	11,043	74.22%	3,605	24.23%	230	1.55%	7,438	49.99%	14,878
Maury	31,464	67.44%	14,418	30.90%	775	1.66%	17,046	36.54%	46,657
McMinn	18,198	79.66%	4,361	19.09%	285	1.25%	13,837	60.57%	22,844
McNairy	9,093	80.65%	1,943	17.23%	239	2.12%	7,150	63.42%	11,275
Meigs	4,467	80.75%	1,008	18.22%	57	1.03%	3,459	62.53%	5,532
Monroe	16,783	80.70%	3,764	18.10%	250	1.20%	13,019	62.60%	20,797
Montgomery	42,187	54.96%	32,472	42.30%	2,099	2.74%	9,715	12.66%	76,758
Moore	2,888	81.60%	573	16.19%	78	2.21%	2,315	65.41%	3,539
Morgan	6,930	84.22%	1,167	14.18%	131	1.60%	5,763	70.04%	8,228
Obion	10,790	79.80%	2,589	19.15%	142	1.05%	8,201	60.65%	13,521
Overton	7,918	78.89%	2,033	20.26%	86	0.85%	5,885	58.63%	10,037
Perry	2,775	80.95%	615	17.94%	38	1.11%	2,160	63.01%	3,428
Pickett	2,381	81.24%	525	17.91%	25	0.85%	1,856	63.33%	2,931
Polk	6,792	81.24%	1,492	17.85%	76	0.91%	5,300	63.39%	8,360
Putnam	23,759	70.73%	9,185	27.34%	649	1.93%	14,574	43.39%	33,593
Rhea	11,050	81.03%	2,369	17.37%	218	1.60%	8,681	63.66%	13,637
Roane	19,230	74.20%	6,043	23.32%	644	2.48%	13,187	50.88%	25,917
Robertson	24,536	72.77%	8,692	25.78%	489	1.45%	15,844	46.99%	33,717
Rutherford	81,480	56.63%	59,341	41.24%	3,057	2.13%	22,139	15.39%	143,878
Scott	8,004	88.42%	986	10.89%	62	0.69%	7,018	77.53%	9,052
Sequatchie	5,855	80.74%	1,298	17.90%	99	1.36%	4,557	62.84%	7,252
Sevier	33,783	77.60%	8,721	20.03%	1,031	2.37%	25,062	57.57%	43,535
Shelby	129,815	33.98%	246,105	64.42%	6,135	1.60%	−116,290	−30.44%	382,055
Smith	7,136	78.84%	1,802	19.91%	113	1.25%	5,334	58.93%	9,051
Stewart	4,950	78.62%	1,232	19.57%	114	1.81%	3,718	59.05%	6,296
Sullivan	55,860	75.12%	17,272	23.23%	1,225	1.65%	38,588	51.89%	74,357
Sumner	63,454	68.50%	27,680	29.88%	1,496	1.62%	35,774	38.62%	92,630
Tipton	20,070	73.49%	6,837	25.04%	401	1.47%	13,233	48.45%	27,308
Trousdale	2,936	73.44%	1,012	25.31%	50	1.25%	1,924	48.13%	3,998
Unicoi	6,599	79.44%	1,615	19.44%	93	1.12%	4,984	60.00%	8,307
Union	6,803	83.75%	1,249	15.38%	71	0.87%	5,554	68.37%	8,123
Van Buren	2,342	80.18%	544	18.62%	35	1.20%	1,798	61.56%	2,921
Warren	11,850	74.02%	3,924	24.51%	235	1.47%	7,926	49.51%	16,009
Washington	40,444	67.18%	18,638	30.96%	1,121	1.86%	21,806	36.22%	60,203
Wayne	5,795	86.89%	820	12.30%	54	0.81%	4,975	74.59%	6,669
Weakley	10,396	75.69%	3,020	21.99%	319	2.32%	7,376	53.70%	13,735
White	9,606	80.76%	2,143	18.02%	146	1.22%	7,463	62.74%	11,895
Williamson	86,469	62.20%	50,161	36.08%	2,386	1.72%	36,308	26.12%	139,016
Wilson	50,296	67.67%	22,254	29.94%	1,780	2.39%	28,042	37.73%	74,330
Totals	1,852,475	60.66%	1,143,711	37.45%	57,665	1.89%	708,764	23.21%	3,053,851

==== By congressional district ====
Trump won seven of nine congressional districts.

District	Trump	Biden	Representative
1st	76.18%	22.12%	Phil Roe
1st	76.18%	22.12%	Diana Harshbarger
2nd	63.59%	34.50%	Tim Burchett
3rd	65.31%	32.93%	Chuck Fleischmann
4th	67.54%	30.65%	Scott DesJarlais
5th	36.74%	60.28%	Jim Cooper
6th	72.69%	25.60%	John W. Rose
7th	66.88%	31.33%	Mark E. Green
8th	65.51%	33.09%	David Kustoff
9th	20.1%	78.29%	Steve Cohen

== Analysis ==
A Southern state in the heart of the Bible Belt, no Democrat has won Tennessee's electoral votes since Bill Clinton of neighboring Arkansas, who shared the ticket with favorite son Al Gore, in 1996, nor has it been contested at the presidential level since 2000, when Gore narrowly lost his home state by less than 4 points. The last Democratic presidential candidate to win at least 40% of the state vote was Barack Obama in 2008, and Republicans have occupied all statewide offices in Tennessee since 2011.

Winning the state by 708,764 votes, Tennessee gave Trump his largest margin of victory by the number of votes nationally. This exceeded the 631,221-vote margin by which he won in Texas, marking the first time since 1988 (when Florida provided the largest margin of victory) where Texas did not provide the Republican presidential nominee with his widest margin of votes for a statewide victory. Additionally, this is the second consecutive election in which a nominee carried over 60% of Tennessee's vote.

Biden won the same counties as Clinton did: urban Shelby and Davidson counties—anchored by Memphis and Nashville, respectively—as well as majority-Black Haywood County. In addition, Trump performed somewhat better than polls anticipated, as they had Trump leading Biden by 55%–41%. Biden also became the first Democrat to win the presidency without Hardeman County.

Despite this, Biden was able to improve his support in the Nashville metropolitan area, gaining 64.5% of the vote in Davidson County, the best Democratic performance in the county since FDR won 72.1% of the vote in 1944. At the same time, Biden also made gains in the Nashville suburban counties of Williamson, Rutherford, Wilson, Sumner, and Cheatham, performing considerably better than Hillary Clinton in 2016. For example, Biden lost Rutherford County, anchored by Murfreesboro, only by 15.4%, much lower than Clinton's 25.9-point loss in 2016. Additionally, he narrowed Trump's margins in Hamilton County—anchored by Chattanooga, the state's fourth largest city—only losing it by 9.7 points, the best Democratic performance there since Bill Clinton lost the county by 6.5% in 1996. Biden won 44.1% of Hamilton County's popular vote, the best Democratic percentage since Carter's 48% in 1976. Biden narrowed Knox County—anchored by Knoxville, the state's third largest city—from a loss of 23.73% in 2016 to 15.02% in 2020. This election is the first time a Democrat has even garnered 40% of the vote in Rutherford County since 2000, when favorite son Al Gore lost the county by 9.7 points while at the same time losing both his home state and the election.

=== By Grand Division ===
Results by Grand Division Trump: 40–50% 50–60% 60–70%

Trump won all three of Tennessee's Grand Divisions—West, Middle, and East Tennessee. Middle and East Tennessee are solidly Republican, while West Tennessee, owing to its high Black population, was formerly loyal to the Democrats. It has become competitive for Republicans in recent elections. In 2016, Trump had won it with 48.93% to Clinton's 47.82%. Democrats had previously won West Tennessee in 2004, 2008, and 2012.

Grand Division	Trump	Biden
West	49.43%	49.06%
Middle	59.20%	38.67%
East	68.97%	29.27%

== See also ==
- United States presidential elections in Tennessee
- 2020 United States presidential election
- 2020 Democratic Party presidential primaries
- 2020 Republican Party presidential primaries
- 2020 Tennessee elections
- 2020 United States elections
