= McWherter =

McWherter is a surname. Notable people with the surname include:

- Mike McWherter (born 1955), American lawyer, businessman, and politician
- Ned McWherter (1930–2011), American politician
