= First State =

First State may refer to:

- The official nickname of Delaware
- First State (DJ), Dutch trance act formed in the year 2005

== Parks ==
- First State Heritage Park, in Dover, Delaware
- First State National Historical Park, in Delaware and Pennsylvania

== See also ==
- First State Bank (disambiguation)
- First State Super, Australian superannuation fund
- First Statement, Canadian literary magazine
