= 2010 Tennessee gubernatorial election =

- November 2, 2010
- Turnout: 41.32% ▼8.65 pp
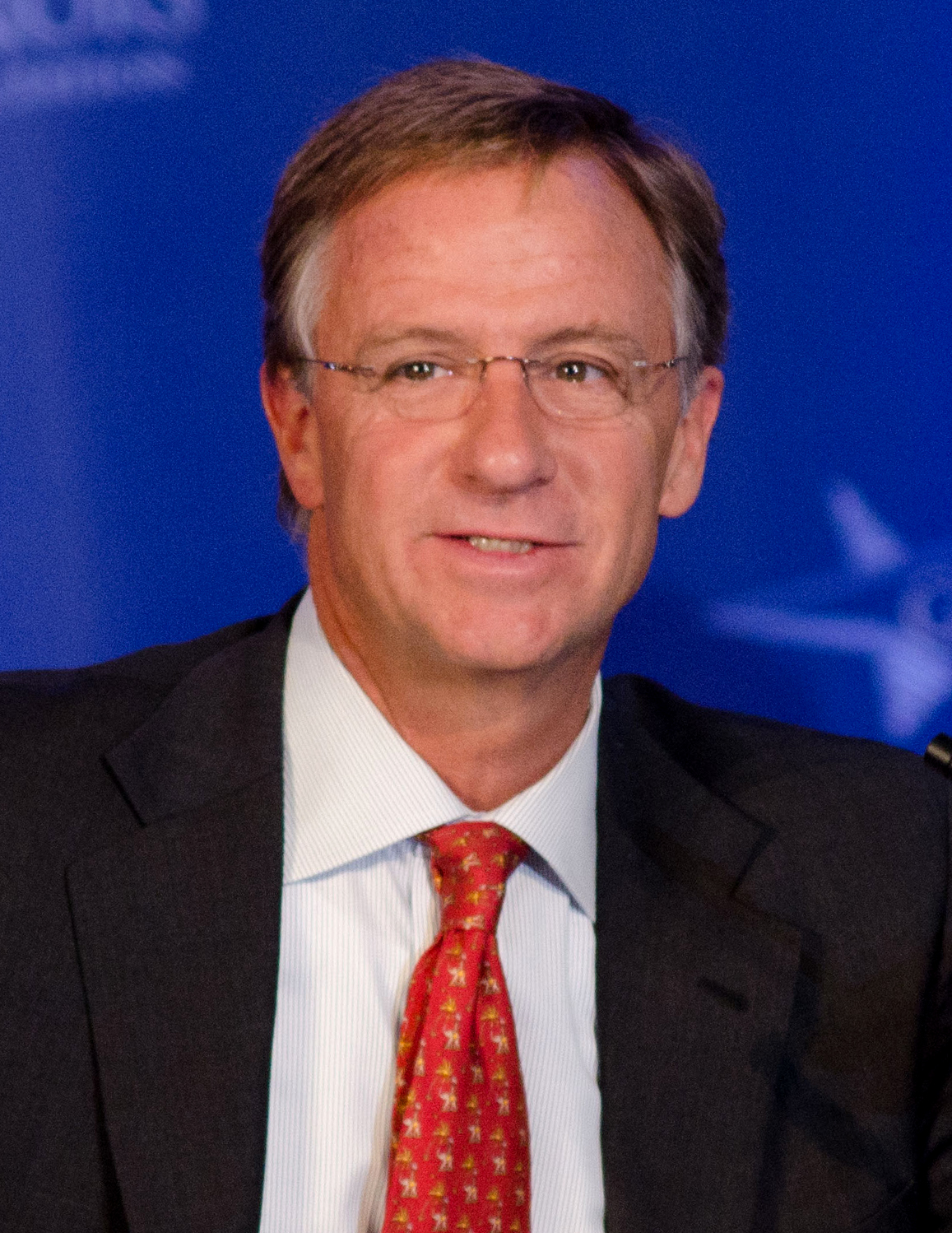

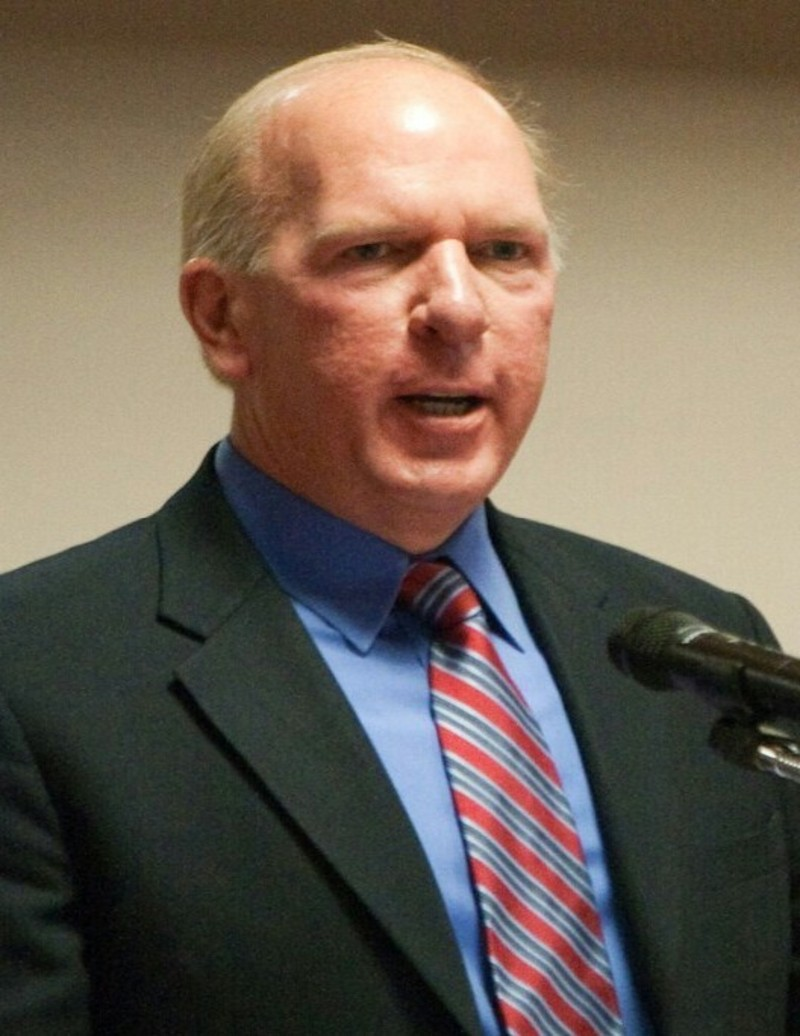
Nominee	Bill Haslam	Mike McWherter
Party	Republican	Democratic
Popular vote	1,041,545	529,851
Percentage	65.03%	33.08%
- Haslam: 50–60% 60–70% 70–80% 80–90% McWherter: 40–50% 50–60% 60–70%
Governor before election
Phil Bredesen
Democratic
Elected Governor
Bill Haslam
Republican

The 2010 Tennessee gubernatorial election took place on November 2, 2010, to elect the next governor of Tennessee, alongside other state and local elections. Incumbent Democratic Governor Phil Bredesen was term-limited and prohibited by the Constitution of Tennessee from seeking a third consecutive term. Knoxville Mayor and Republican nominee Bill Haslam was elected with 65.0% of the vote, defeating Democratic nominee Mike McWherter.

The primary election was held on August 5, 2010, with Haslam and McWherter winning their respective parties' nominations.

Haslam received endorsements from former U.S. senator Howard Baker and Congressman Jimmy Duncan. The Tennessean wrote, "Haslam appears most likely to be able to ride Gov. Phil Bredesen's pro-business coattails, despite the different party affiliation."

Haslam campaigned on his executive experience as both Knoxville's mayor and the president of a major company. His opponents attacked him as an oil executive, especially in the wake of price-gouging allegations levied against Pilot in the wake of the post-Hurricane Katrina fuel shortages, and criticized his refusal to release information related to his income while at Pilot.

With this win, Haslam flipped the state into Republican control, with the state legislature also being controlled by Republicans. The last time Republicans held a government trifecta in the state was in 1869. Ever since this election, Republicans have maintained their trifecta.

News organizations The Cook Political Report, CQ Politics, and The New York Times rated the gubernatorial election as leaning Republican, while The Rothenberg Political Report rated it as "Republican favored," RealClearPolitics and Sabato's Crystal Ball as "Likely Republican", and Rasmussen Reports as "Solid Republican."

== Republican primary ==
A recorded debate featuring three of the candidates, organized by campaign coordinator James Crenshaw, was held at the Scarett-Benett Center in Nashville, Tennessee.

From July 1, 2009, until January 15, 2010, Haslam collected $1.8 million, Ramsey raised $1,412,593 including a $200,000 loan, Wamp raised $1,373,078 including a $61,000 loan, and Gibbons raised $225,218.

=== Candidates ===
- Bill Haslam, mayor of Knoxville
- Joe Kirkpatrick, businessman; withdrew from race
- Basil Marceaux, Soddy Daisy resident
- Ron Ramsey, lieutenant governor
- Zach Wamp, U.S. representative, 3rd district

=== Polling ===
Poll source	Dates administered	Bill Haslam	Ron Ramsey	Zach Wamp	Undecided
Mason-Dixon	July 19–21, 2010	36%	20%	25%	17%
WSMV TV Channel 4	July 8, 2010	32%	11%	21%	36%

=== Results ===
County results Haslam: <40%; 40–50%; 50–60%; 60–70%; >70%; Wamp: <40%; 40–50%; 50–60%; 60–70%; 70–80%; Ramsey: <40%; 40–50%; 50–60%; 60–70%; Tie: 30–40%

Republican primary results
Party	Candidate	Votes	%
Republican	Bill Haslam	341,229	47.34%
Republican	Zach Wamp	210,332	29.18%
Republican	Ron Ramsey	158,960	22.05%
Republican	Joe Kirkpatrick	6,775	0.94%
Republican	Basil Marceaux	3,508	0.49%
Total votes		720,804	100.00%

== Democratic primary ==
From July 1, 2009, until January 15, 2010, State Senate Minority Leader Jim Kyle collected $741,485 including a $300,000 personal loan, McWherter raised $402,868, and Kim McMillan raised $159,981.

=== Candidates ===
- Mike McWherter, businessman, former attorney, son of former governor Ned McWherter

=== Results ===
Democratic primary results
Party	Candidate	Votes	%
Democratic	Mike McWherter	284,894	100.00%
Total votes		284,894	100.00%

== Independents ==
- Bayron Binkley, broker
- Brandon Dodds, optometrist
- Samuel David Duck, Independent Federalist (withdrew from race and endorsed Brandon Dodds)
- David Gatchell
- June Griffin
- Toni Hall
- Floyd Knois
- J. David Maharrey, Tea Party
- Boyce McCall
- Linda Kay Perry
- James Reesor, Tennessee author
- Thomas Smith II
- Howard Switzer, architect (Green Party nominee; listed on the ballot as an independent)
- Carl Twofeathers Whitaker, Native American Indian Movement chief

== General election ==
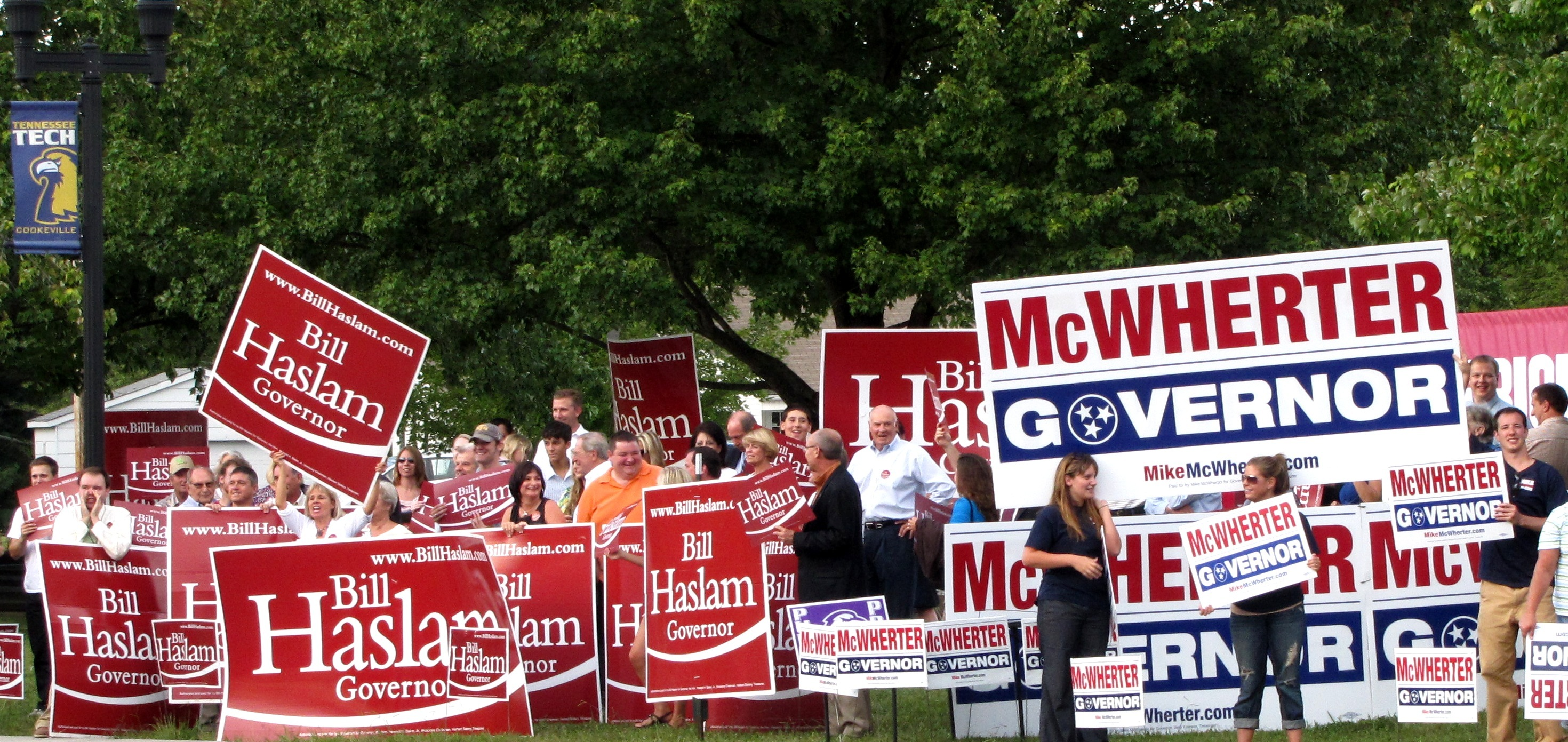
Simultaneous Haslam and McWherter rallies before the Highlands town hall debate

=== Predictions ===
Source	Ranking	As of
Cook Political Report	Safe R (flip)	October 14, 2010
Rothenberg	Safe R (flip)	October 28, 2010
RealClearPolitics	Safe R (flip)	November 1, 2010
Sabato's Crystal Ball	Likely R (flip)	October 28, 2010
CQ Politics	Lean R (flip)	October 28, 2010

=== Polling ===
Poll source	Date(s) administered	Sample size	Margin of error	Mike McWherter (D)	Bill Haslam (R)	Other	Unde- cided
MTSU (report)	October 24, 2010	635	± 4%	29%	51%	4%	6%
MTSU (report)	October 14, 2010	635	± 4%	19%	41.6%	4%	36%
Rasmussen Reports (report)	October 9, 2010	500	± 4.5%	31%	59%	3%	6%
Rasmussen Reports (report)	September 7, 2010	500	± 4.5%	31%	59%	2%	7%
Rasmussen Reports (report)	August 9, 2010	500	± 4.5%	31%	56%	3%	10%
Mason-Dixon (report)	July 19–21, 2010	625	± 5.0%	31%	49%	—	20%
WSMV-TV Channel 4 (report)	July 8, 2010	603	± 4.0%	34%	60%	—	6%
Rasmussen Reports (report)	June 15, 2010	500	± 4.5%	32%	50%	5%	14%
Rasmussen Reports (report)	March 22, 2010	500	± 4.5%	27%	45%	5%	23%

=== Results ===

2010 Tennessee gubernatorial election
Party	Candidate	Votes	%	±%
Republican	Bill Haslam	1,041,545	65.03%	+35.83%
Democratic	Mike McWherter	529,851	33.08%	−35.24%
Independent	Carl Twofeathers Whitaker	6,536	0.41%	N/A
Independent	Brandon Dodds	4,728	0.29%	N/A
Independent	Bayron Binkley	4,663	0.29%	N/A
Independent	June Griffin	2,587	0.16%	N/A
Independent	Linda Kay Perry	2,057	0.13%	N/A
Independent	Howard M. Switzer	1,887	0.12%	N/A
Independent	Samuel David Duck	1,755	0.11%	N/A
Independent	Thomas Smith II	1,207	0.07%	N/A
Independent	Toni K. Hall	993	0.06%	N/A
Independent	David Gatchell	859	0.05%	N/A
Independent	Boyce T. McCall	828	0.05%	N/A
Independent	James Reesor	809	0.05%	N/A
Independent	Mike Knois	600	0.03%	N/A
Independent	Donald Ray McFolin	583	0.03%	N/A
Independent	Write-Ins (3 candidates)	61	0.003%	N/A
Majority		511,694	32.21%	
Turnout		1,601,567		
Republican gain from Democratic		Swing		

==== By county ====
County	Bill Haslam Republican		Mike McWherter Democratic		Other votes	
County	%	#	%	#	%	#
Anderson	72.50%	13,938	24.89%	4,785	2.61%	502
Bedford	69.50%	6,808	28.31%	2,773	2.20%	215
Benton	51.36%	2,590	47.23%	2,382	1.41%	71
Bledsoe	66.26%	2,527	31.83%	1,214	1.92%	73
Blount	79.38%	23,786	18.19%	5,449	2.42%	728
Bradley	82.10%	17,522	16.29%	3,477	1.61%	344
Campbell	72.75%	6,309	24.78%	2,149	2.47%	214
Cannon	61.51%	2,412	36.09%	1,415	2.40%	94
Carroll	56.72%	4,724	41.83%	3,484	1.44%	120
Carter	76.98%	10,783	21.43%	3,001	1.60%	223
Cheatham	68.92%	7,017	29.16%	2,969	1.91%	195
Chester	69.39%	2,763	28.80%	1,147	1.80%	72
Claiborne	74.45%	4,768	22.85%	1,463	2.71%	173
Clay	59.07%	1,179	38.98%	778	1.95%	39
Cocke	75.69%	6,385	22.08%	1,863	2.24%	188
Coffee	69.43%	9,436	28.49%	3,872	2.09%	283
Crockett	64.49%	2,818	34.42%	1,504	1.10%	48
Cumberland	77.71%	15,550	20.29%	4,061	1.98%	399
Davidson	48.44%	75,381	49.11%	76,427	2.44%	3,810
Decatur	56.31%	1,820	41.80%	1,351	1.89%	61
DeKalb	58.40%	2,870	39.62%	1,947	1.98%	97
Dickson	64.09%	7,812	34.04%	4,150	1.87%	228
Dyer	66.48%	6,576	28.79%	2,847	4.72%	467
Fayette	68.78%	8,490	29.71%	3,667	1.51%	187
Fentress	71.44%	3,630	27.04%	1,374	1.51%	77
Franklin	63.35%	7,792	34.73%	4,272	1.92%	236
Gibson	57.57%	8,664	40.88%	6,152	1.55%	233
Giles	60.25%	4,936	37.52%	3,074	2.22%	183
Grainger	74.79%	3,399	22.75%	1,034	2.46%	112
Greene	76.83%	12,066	21.11	3,315	2.07	324
Grundy	55.07%	1,693	42.03%	1,292	1.90%	89
Hamblen	79.47%	10,798	19.19%	2,608	1.33%	181
Hamilton	65.59%	57,090	32.81%	28,556	1.60%	1,393
Hancock	73.25%	923	24.21%	305	2.54%	32
Hardeman	50.45%	3,250	47.25%	3,044	2.28%	148
Hardin	69.10%	4,315	28.98%	1,810	1.92%	120
Hawkins	75.29%	9,320	22.76%	2,817	1.95%	241
Haywood	45.70%	2,462	52.96%	2,853	1.34%	72
Henderson	69.43%	4,328	28.73%	1,791	1.85%	115
Henry	55.20%	5,261	43.33%	4,129	1.46%	140
Hickman	59.80%	3,156	37.89%	2,000	1.85%	122
Houston	47.90%	1,016	49.74%	1,055	2.36%	50
Humphreys	53.62%	2,689	44.51%	2,232	1.88%	94
Jackson	53.02%	1,587	44.54%	1,333	2.45%	73
Jefferson	79.54%	8,895	18.24%	2,040	2.21%	248
Johnson	75.59%	3,452	22.62%	1,033	1.80%	82
Knox	81.07%	84,915	17.06%	17,869	1.87%	1,958
Lake	47.38%	661	49.32%	688	3.35%	46
Lauderdale	54.74%	3,369	43.64%	2,686	1.63%	100
Lawrence	66.54%	7,722	32.00%	3,714	1.46%	169
Lewis	63.42%	2,235	33.97%	1,197	2.61%	92
Lincoln	72.30%	6,196	24.15%	2,070	3.55%	304
Loudon	82.07%	12,552	15.78%	2,413	2.16%	330
Macon	68.21%	3,349	29.84%	1,465	1.96%	96
Madison	55.74%	15,762	43.20%	12,214	1.06%	300
Marion	62.47%	4,579	35.69%	2,616	1.84%	135
Marshall	63.50%	4,810	34.59%	2,620	1.93%	145
Maury	65.50%	15,190	32.82%	7,612	1.67%	389
McMinn	76.63%	8,711	21.66%	2,462	1.71%	194
McNairy	64.05%	4,357	34.44%	2,343	1.51%	103
Meigs	68.28%	1,804	29.52%	780	2.20%	58
Monroe	75.02%	7,795	23.09%	2,399	1.88%	196
Montgomery	61.80%	19,227	35.87%	11,159	2.33%	726
Moore	68.59%	1,435	27.68%	579	3.73%	78
Morgan	69.81%	3,032	27.33%	1,187	2.85%	124
Obion	53.99%	5,063	43.21%	4,052	2.80%	263
Overton	58.68%	3,088	39.24%	2,065	2.08%	109
Perry	55.34%	1,057	41.83%	799	2.83%	54
Pickett	66.20%	1,428	31.66%	683	2.13%	46
Polk	64.86%	2,569	32.69%	1,295	2.45%	97
Putnam	69.83%	13,031	28.44%	5,306	1.73%	323
Rhea	76.06%	5,452	21.58%	1,547	2.35%	169
Roane	73.79%	11,523	23.74%	3,707	2.36%	385
Robertson	67.94%	12,151	30.28%	5,416	1.78%	318
Rutherford	68.77%	41,999	29.33%	17,912	1.89%	1,160
Scott	74.48%	3,522	23.41%	1,107	2.10%	100
Sequatchie	70.74%	2,497	24.37%	966	1.89%	96
Sevier	84.01%	16,592	13.63%	2,692	2.36%	467
Shelby	46.74%	107,227	51.86%	118,977	1.39%	3,200
Smith	58.36%	3,369	39.67%	2,290	1.98%	114
Stewart	54.91%	2,120	43.05%	707	2.04%	79
Sullivan	77.44%	30,529	21.20%	8,359	1.36%	535
Sumner	73.17%	32,543	26.12%	13,672	2.31%	1,209
Tipton	68.63%	10,880	29.69%	4,706	1.69%	267
Trousdale	56.06%	1,170	41.93%	875	2.01%	42
Unicoi	75.48%	3,334	22.66%	1.001	1.85%	82
Union	75.15%	2,861	22.83%	869	2.02%	77
Van Buren	57.29%	931	40.25%	654	2.46%	40
Warren	59.61%	5,745	37.77%	3,640	2.62%	253
Washington	76.95%	22,403	21.63%	6,296	1.42%	415
Wayne	73.26%	2,606	25.13%	894	1.60%	57
Weakley	51.76%	4,891	46.49%	4,393	1.74%	165
White	64.94%	4,542	32.31%	2,260	2.75%	192
Williamson	80.06%	48,518	18.29%	11,085	1.65%	1,000
Wilson	72.88%	25,217	25.21%	8,724	1.91%	659

Counties that flipped from Democratic to Republican

- Bledsoe (largest city: Pikeville)
- Claiborne (largest city: Harrogate)
- Hardin (largest city: Savannah)
- Lincoln (largest city: Fayetteville)
- Macon (largest city: Lafayette)
- Pickett (largest city: Byrdstown)
- Rutherford (largest city: Murfreesboro)
- Sumner (largest city: Hendersonville)
- Wilson (largest city: Mt. Juliet)
- Tipton (largest city: Atoka)
- Madison (largest city: Jackson)
- Chester (largest city: Henderson)
- Henderson (largest city: Lexington)
- Wayne (largest city: Waynesboro)
- Williamson (largest city: Franklin)
- Scott (largest city: Oneida)
- Cumberland (largest city: Crossville)
- Meigs (largest city: Decatur)
- Hamilton (largest city: Chattanooga)
- Bradley (largest city: Cleveland)
- McMinn (largest city: Athens)
- Blount (largest city: Maryville)
- Loudon (largest city: Lenoir City)
- Monroe (largest city: Sweetwater)
- Sevier (largest city: Sevierville)
- Jefferson (largest city: Jefferson City)
- Knox (largest city: Knoxville)
- Cocke (largest city: Newport)
- Grainer (largest city: Bean Station)
- Hamlben (largest city: Morristown)
- Greene (largest city: Greenville)
- Hancock (largest city: Sneedville)
- Hawkins (largest city: Kingsport)
- Sullivan (largest city: Kingsport)
- Johnson (largest city: Mountain City)
- Washington (largest city: Johnson City)
- Carter (largest city: Elizabethton)
- Unicoi (largest city: Erwin)
- Anderson (largest city: Oak Ridge)
- Carroll (largest city: McKenzie)
- Cheatham (largest city: Ashland City)
- Coffee (largest city: Tullahoma)
- Dyer (largest city: Dyersburg)
- Fayette (largest town: Oakland)
- Fentress (largest city: Jamestown)
- Lawrence (largest city: Lawrenceburg)
- Maury (largest city: Columbia)
- McNairy (largest city: Selmer)
- Meigs (largest city: Decatur)
- Montgomery (largest city: Clarksville)
- Moore (largest city: Lynchburg)
- Morgan (largest city: Coalfield)
- Obion (largest city: Union City)
- Polk (largest city: Benton)
- Putnam (largest city: Cookeville)
- Roane (largest city: Oak Ridge)
- Sequatchie (largest city: Dunlap)
- Union (largest city: Maynardville)
- Weakley (largest city: Martin)
- Bedford (largest city: Shelbyville)
- Campbell (largest city: LaFollette)
- Cannon (largest city: Woodbury)
- Crockett (largest city: Bells)
- Decatur (largest city: Parsons)
- DeKalb (largest city: Smithville)
- Dickson (largest city: Dickson)
- Franklin (largest city: Winchester)
- Gibson (largest city: Humboldt)
- Giles (largest city: Pulaski)
- Henry (largest city: Paris)
- Hickman (largest city: Centerville)
- Lewis (largest city: Hohenwald)
- Marion (largest city: Jasper)
- Marshall (largest city: Lewisburg)
- Robertson (largest city: Springfield)
- Warren (largest city: McMinnville)
- White (largest city: Sparta)
- Benton (largest municipality: Camden)
- Clay (largest municipality: Celina)
- Grundy (largest municipality: Altamont)
- Humphreys (largest municipality: Waverly)
- Lauderdale (largest municipality: Ripley)
- Overton (largest municipality: Livingston)
- Perry (largest municipality: Linden)
- Smith (largest municipality: Carthage)
- Stewart (largest municipality: Dover)
- Trousdale (largest municipality: Hartsville)
- Van Buren (largest municipality: Spencer)
- Jackson (largest town: Gainesboro)
- Hardeman (largest city: Bolivar)
- Rhea (largest city: Dayton)

== See also ==
- 2010 United States House of Representatives elections in Tennessee
- 2010 Tennessee elections
