= 2016 United States presidential election in Tennessee =

- November 8, 2016
- Turnout: 61.92% (▲0.06 pp)

Nominee	Donald Trump	Hillary Clinton
Party	Republican	Democratic
Home state	New York	New York
Running mate	Mike Pence	Tim Kaine
Electoral vote	11	0
Popular vote	1,522,925	870,695
Percentage	60.72%	34.72%

Trump
40–50%
50–60%
60–70%
70–80%
80–90%
90–100%
Clinton
40–50%
50–60%
60–70%
70–80%
80–90%
90–100%
Tie/No data
President before election
Barack Obama
Democratic
Elected President
Donald Trump
Republican

Treemap of the popular vote by county.

The 2016 United States presidential election in Tennessee was held on November 8, 2016, as part of the 2016 General Election in which all 50 states plus the District of Columbia participated. Tennessee voters chose electors to represent them in the Electoral College via a popular vote pitting the Republican nominee, businessman Donald Trump, and running mate Indiana Governor Mike Pence against Democratic nominee, former Secretary of State Hillary Clinton and her running mate, Virginia Senator Tim Kaine.

On March 1, 2016, in the presidential primaries, Tennessee voters expressed their preferences for the Democratic and Republican parties' respective nominees for president. Registered members of each party only voted in their party's primary, while voters who were unaffiliated chose any one primary in which to vote.

Trump won the election in Tennessee with 60.7% of the vote. Clinton received 34.7% of the vote. This is the first time since 1972 that either party has earned over 60% of the vote in Tennessee. Tennessee was one of eleven states won by Bill Clinton in 1992 and 1996 but lost by Hillary Clinton.

== Primary elections ==
=== Democratic primary ===
Hillary Clinton was challenged by Bernie Sanders, the only other major candidate remaining in the Democratic primaries. Clinton won the state, defeating Sanders by 33.6 points and earning 44 delegates while Sanders earned 23 delegates.

Popular vote share by county Clinton: 40–50%; 50–60%; 60–70%; 70–80%; 80–90%; Sanders: 50–60%

Tennessee Democratic primary, March 1, 2016
Candidate	Popular vote		Estimated delegates		
Candidate	Count	Percentage	Pledged	Unpledged	Total
Hillary Clinton	245,930	66.07%	44	7	51
Bernie Sanders	120,800	32.45%	23	0	23
Martin O'Malley (withdrawn)	2,025	0.54%			
Uncommitted	3,467	0.93%	0	1	1
Total	372,222	100%	67	8	75

=== Republican primary ===
Donald Trump won the primary with a plurality, carrying 38.9% of the vote and all but one county, awarding him 33 delegates.

Texas Senator Ted Cruz, came second with 24.7% of the vote and 16 delegates. Florida Senator Marco Rubio came third with 21.2% of the vote and 9 delegates, carrying only the county of Williamson. All other candidates did not receive any delegates.

Popular vote share by county Trump: 20–30% 30–40% 40–50% 50–60%; Rubio: 30–40%

Tennessee Republican primary, March 1, 2016
Candidate	Votes	Percentage	Actual delegate count		
Candidate	Votes	Percentage	Bound	Unbound	Total
Donald Trump	333,180	38.94%	33	0	33
Ted Cruz	211,471	24.71%	16	0	16
Marco Rubio	181,274	21.18%	9	0	9
Ben Carson	64,951	7.59%	0	0	0
John Kasich	45,301	5.29%	0	0	0
Jeb Bush (withdrawn)	9,551	1.12%	0	0	0
Mike Huckabee (withdrawn)	2,415	0.28%	0	0	0
Rand Paul (withdrawn)	2,350	0.27%	0	0	0
Uncommitted	1,849	0.22%	0	0	0
Chris Christie (withdrawn)	1,256	0.15%	0	0	0
Carly Fiorina (withdrawn)	715	0.08%	0	0	0
Rick Santorum (withdrawn)	710	0.08%	0	0	0
Jim Gilmore (withdrawn)	267	0.03%	0	0	0
Lindsey Graham (withdrawn)	253	0.03%	0	0	0
George Pataki (withdrawn)	186	0.02%	0	0	0
Unprojected delegates:			0	0	0
Total:	855,729	100.00%	58	0	58
Source: The Green Papers

== General election ==
=== Voting history ===
Tennessee has not voted for a Democratic presidential nominee since 1996. In 2012, Republican nominee Mitt Romney won the state by a margin of more than twenty points due to the unpopularity of the Obama administration in the conservative state. Typically Democrats do very well in the urban regions of Memphis and Nashville, while Republicans dominate the rural and suburban areas. Tennessee is considered a safe Republican state. In 2016, it stayed that way, with Trump winning the state with 60.7% of the vote.

=== Predictions ===
Source	Ranking	As of
Los Angeles Times	Safe R	November 6, 2016
CNN	Safe R	November 4, 2016
Cook Political Report	Safe R	November 7, 2016
Electoral-vote.com	Likely R	November 8, 2016
Rothenberg Political Report	Safe R	November 7, 2016
Sabato's Crystal Ball	Safe R	November 7, 2016
RealClearPolitics	Likely R	November 8, 2016
NBC	Likely R	November 7, 2016

^Highest rating given

=== Electoral slates ===
The following individuals were nominated as presidential electors: (Note: Under Tennessee law, only "statewide political parties" (those polling at least 5% in a prior statewide election) are granted automatic ballot access under their party name. All other candidates must qualify as independents by submitting a petition with the required number of signatures from registered voters.) (Note: While several additional minor candidates qualified for the Tennessee ballot in 2016, only the slates for the top eight candidates by vote total are listed here; the full list of candidates and their respective electors is available in the provided source.)

Donald Trump and Mike Pence Republican Party	Hillary Clinton and Tim Kaine Democratic Party	Gary Johnson and Bill Weld Libertarian Party	Jill Stein and Ajamu Baraka Green Party
Patricia Allen; Beth Scott Clayton Amos; Mike Callahan; Drew Daniel; Lynne Davis; Shannon Haynes; Liz Holiway; Joey Jacobs; Tom Lawless; Susan Mills; Jason Mumpower	Raumesh Akbari; John T. Bragg, Jr. Gale Jones Carson; Michael T. Cartwright; Roy Cockrum; Andrea Conte; Richard J. Eskind; Nancy Fischman; Aubrey T. Givens; Annie Hall; Michael McWherter	Thomas C. Arnold, Jr. Joshua James; Edward D. Marsh; John Polk III; Caleb Rowe; Michael D. Salyer; Heather L. Scott; Paul L. Teague; James L. Tomasik; Stephen A. Trinward; Mark R. White	Lori D. Bowers; Kathleen A. Culver; Elizabeth Dachowski; Aaron Fowles; Penny Gharanfoli; Richard E. Griffith, Jr. Martin Holsinger; Martin Pleasant; Clarence W. Raupach; Howard M. Switzer; Joan Thomas
Evan McMullin and Nathan Johnson Independent	Mike Smith and Daniel White Independent	Rocky De La Fuente and Michael Steinberg American Delta	Alyson Kennedy and Osborne Hart Socialist Workers
Michael Calton Bowen; Elaine Annette Curtis-Quick; Christy Helen Grimste; Elaine Abigail Hall; Colby Scott Humprey; Scott Liedel; Henry G. Loeb; Patrece McCrary; Larry Thomas McFarland; Stacey Jean Plant; Charles Robert Powell	Brooke Clement; Gregory Cox; Jamie K. McPherson; Austin W. Parsons; Tanner Rice; Carol A. Roberson; Juanita Smith; Vicki S. Smith; Windy Smith; Ann Brown Thomason; Verlinda C. Waters	Ronnie D. Allen; Harvey Anderson; Jasmin Brooks; Carol Gibson; Steven Goldsmith; Joe Johnson Jr. Clint Larsen; Roshunda Merritt; Patricia Washington; Kelsey Wood; Quintus Woodard	Alishia Banks; Ashley Jones; Leonard O. Keitt; John B. Miller; Beyonca J. Patterson; Chester Porter; Larry Ransom; Rita P. Salgado; Kalley T. Sutton; Charles H. Watt III; Virginia A. Welsch

=== Results ===
State Senate district results

State House district results

2016 United States presidential election in Tennessee
Party	Candidate	Votes	%
Republican	Donald Trump/Mike Pence	1,522,925	60.72%
Democratic	Hillary Clinton/Tim Kaine	870,695	34.72%
Independent	Gary Johnson	70,397	2.81%
Independent	Jill Stein	15,993	0.64%
Independent	Evan McMullin (write-in)	11,991	0.48%
Independent	Mike Smith	7,276	0.29%
Independent	Rocky De La Fuente	4,075	0.16%
Independent	Alyson Kennedy	2,877	0.12%
Write-in		1,798	0.07%
Total votes		2,508,027	100.00%

==== By county ====
County	Donald Trump Republican		Hillary Clinton Democratic		Various candidates Other parties		Margin		Total
County	#	%	#	%	#	%	#	%	Total
Anderson	19,212	64.30%	9,013	30.16%	1,656	5.54%	10,199	34.14%	29,881
Bedford	11,486	74.80%	3,395	22.11%	474	3.09%	8,091	52.69%	15,355
Benton	4,716	74.53%	1,474	23.29%	138	2.18%	3,242	51.24%	6,328
Bledsoe	3,622	77.66%	897	19.23%	145	3.11%	2,725	58.43%	4,664
Blount	37,443	71.72%	12,100	23.18%	2,665	5.10%	25,343	48.54%	52,208
Bradley	29,768	76.99%	7,070	18.28%	1,828	4.73%	22,698	58.71%	38,666
Campbell	9,870	78.76%	2,248	17.94%	414	3.30%	7,622	60.82%	12,532
Cannon	4,007	75.40%	1,127	21.21%	180	3.39%	2,880	54.19%	5,314
Carroll	7,756	74.69%	2,327	22.41%	301	2.90%	5,429	52.28%	10,384
Carter	16,898	80.15%	3,453	16.38%	733	3.47%	13,445	63.77%	21,084
Cheatham	11,297	70.94%	3,878	24.35%	749	4.71%	7,419	46.59%	15,924
Chester	5,081	78.09%	1,243	19.10%	183	2.81%	3,838	58.99%	6,507
Claiborne	8,602	80.09%	1,832	17.06%	306	2.85%	6,770	63.03%	10,740
Clay	2,141	73.32%	707	24.21%	72	2.47%	1,434	49.11%	2,920
Cocke	9,791	80.74%	1,981	16.34%	354	2.92%	7,810	64.40%	12,126
Coffee	14,417	72.19%	4,743	23.75%	811	4.06%	9,674	48.44%	19,971
Crockett	3,982	73.78%	1,303	24.14%	112	2.08%	2,679	49.64%	5,397
Cumberland	20,413	77.44%	5,202	19.73%	745	2.83%	15,211	57.71%	26,360
Davidson	84,550	33.95%	148,864	59.77%	15,654	6.28%	-64,314	-25.82%	249,068
Decatur	3,588	78.14%	894	19.47%	110	2.39%	2,694	58.67%	4,592
DeKalb	5,171	74.35%	1,569	22.56%	215	3.09%	3,602	51.79%	6,955
Dickson	13,233	70.77%	4,722	25.25%	744	3.98%	8,511	45.52%	18,699
Dyer	10,180	76.33%	2,816	21.12%	340	2.55%	7,364	55.21%	13,336
Fayette	13,055	67.31%	5,874	30.29%	465	2.40%	7,181	37.02%	19,394
Fentress	6,038	82.34%	1,100	15.00%	195	2.66%	4,938	67.34%	7,333
Franklin	11,532	70.30%	4,374	26.66%	498	3.04%	7,158	43.64%	16,404
Gibson	13,786	70.53%	5,258	26.90%	503	2.57%	8,528	43.63%	19,547
Giles	7,970	71.56%	2,917	26.19%	250	2.25%	5,053	45.37%	11,137
Grainger	6,626	82.74%	1,154	14.41%	228	2.85%	5,472	68.33%	8,008
Greene	18,562	78.71%	4,216	17.88%	805	3.41%	14,346	60.83%	23,583
Grundy	3,636	76.34%	999	20.97%	128	2.69%	2,637	55.37%	4,763
Hamblen	15,857	76.63%	4,075	19.69%	760	3.68%	11,782	56.94%	20,692
Hamilton	78,733	55.29%	55,316	38.84%	8,359	5.87%	23,417	16.45%	142,408
Hancock	1,843	82.61%	322	14.43%	66	2.96%	1,521	68.18%	2,231
Hardeman	4,919	53.05%	4,185	45.13%	169	1.82%	734	7.92%	9,273
Hardin	8,012	80.53%	1,622	16.30%	315	3.17%	6,390	64.23%	9,949
Hawkins	16,648	80.14%	3,507	16.88%	619	2.98%	13,141	63.26%	20,774
Haywood	3,013	44.09%	3,711	54.30%	110	1.61%	-698	-10.21%	6,834
Henderson	8,138	79.65%	1,800	17.62%	279	2.73%	6,338	62.03%	10,217
Henry	9,508	73.45%	3,063	23.66%	374	2.89%	6,445	49.79%	12,945
Hickman	5,695	72.89%	1,824	23.35%	294	3.76%	3,871	49.54%	7,813
Houston	2,182	68.88%	866	27.34%	120	3.78%	1,316	41.54%	3,168
Humphreys	4,930	68.92%	1,967	27.50%	256	3.58%	2,963	41.42%	7,153
Jackson	3,236	72.46%	1,129	25.28%	101	2.26%	2,107	47.18%	4,466
Jefferson	14,776	77.47%	3,494	18.32%	802	4.21%	11,282	59.15%	19,072
Johnson	5,410	82.23%	988	15.02%	181	2.75%	4,422	67.21%	6,579
Knox	105,767	58.53%	62,878	34.80%	12,052	6.67%	42,889	23.73%	180,697
Lake	1,357	68.88%	577	29.29%	36	1.83%	780	39.59%	1,970
Lauderdale	4,884	60.39%	3,056	37.79%	147	1.82%	1,828	22.60%	8,087
Lawrence	12,420	79.28%	2,821	18.01%	425	2.71%	9,599	61.27%	15,666
Lewis	3,585	77.56%	890	19.26%	147	3.18%	2,695	58.30%	4,622
Lincoln	10,398	77.90%	2,554	19.13%	396	2.97%	7,844	58.77%	13,348
Loudon	17,610	75.29%	4,919	21.03%	862	3.68%	12,691	54.26%	23,391
Macon	6,263	83.46%	1,072	14.29%	169	2.25%	5,191	69.17%	7,504
Madison	21,335	55.97%	15,448	40.52%	1,337	3.51%	5,887	15.45%	38,120
Marion	7,696	70.85%	2,832	26.07%	334	3.08%	4,864	44.78%	10,862
Marshall	8,184	71.44%	2,852	24.90%	419	3.66%	5,332	46.54%	11,455
Maury	23,799	67.29%	10,038	28.38%	1,532	4.33%	13,761	38.91%	35,369
McMinn	14,691	78.33%	3,510	18.72%	554	2.95%	11,181	59.61%	18,755
McNairy	7,841	78.11%	1,848	18.41%	349	3.48%	5,993	59.70%	10,038
Meigs	3,342	77.36%	856	19.81%	122	2.83%	2,486	57.55%	4,320
Monroe	13,374	78.24%	3,186	18.64%	533	3.12%	10,188	59.60%	17,093
Montgomery	32,341	56.13%	21,699	37.66%	3,580	6.21%	10,642	18.47%	57,620
Moore	2,325	79.46%	496	16.95%	105	3.59%	1,829	62.51%	2,926
Morgan	5,441	81.15%	1,054	15.72%	210	3.13%	4,387	65.43%	6,705
Obion	9,526	77.77%	2,426	19.81%	297	2.42%	7,100	57.96%	12,249
Overton	6,059	73.63%	1,945	23.64%	225	2.73%	4,114	49.99%	8,229
Perry	2,167	75.90%	597	20.91%	91	3.19%	1,570	54.99%	2,855
Pickett	2,021	77.28%	536	20.50%	58	2.22%	1,485	56.78%	2,615
Polk	5,097	78.17%	1,252	19.20%	171	2.63%	3,845	58.97%	6,520
Putnam	19,002	69.83%	6,851	25.18%	1,359	4.99%	12,151	44.65%	27,212
Rhea	8,660	78.29%	1,942	17.56%	460	4.15%	6,718	60.73%	11,062
Roane	15,880	73.28%	4,837	22.32%	952	4.40%	11,043	50.96%	21,669
Robertson	19,410	71.59%	6,637	24.48%	1,066	3.93%	12,773	47.11%	27,113
Rutherford	64,515	60.05%	36,706	34.17%	6,215	5.78%	27,809	25.88%	107,436
Scott	6,044	84.85%	934	13.11%	145	2.04%	5,110	71.74%	7,123
Sequatchie	4,441	77.99%	1,053	18.49%	200	3.52%	3,388	59.50%	5,694
Sevier	28,629	78.84%	6,297	17.34%	1,386	3.82%	22,332	61.50%	36,312
Shelby	116,344	34.48%	208,992	61.95%	12,047	3.57%	-92,648	-27.47%	337,383
Smith	5,494	73.88%	1,689	22.71%	253	3.41%	3,805	51.17%	7,436
Stewart	3,864	72.92%	1,222	23.06%	213	4.02%	2,642	49.86%	5,299
Sullivan	46,979	75.43%	12,578	20.20%	2,721	4.37%	34,401	55.23%	62,278
Sumner	50,129	70.11%	18,161	25.40%	3,215	4.49%	31,968	44.71%	71,505
Tipton	16,910	72.02%	5,785	24.64%	786	3.34%	11,125	47.38%	23,481
Trousdale	2,103	66.55%	946	29.94%	111	3.51%	1,157	36.61%	3,160
Unicoi	5,671	78.82%	1,262	17.54%	262	3.64%	4,409	61.28%	7,195
Union	5,053	80.89%	1,012	16.20%	182	2.91%	4,041	64.69%	6,247
Van Buren	1,820	75.24%	539	22.28%	60	2.48%	1,281	52.96%	2,419
Warren	9,540	70.09%	3,535	25.97%	537	3.94%	6,005	44.12%	13,612
Washington	34,252	68.85%	13,024	26.18%	2,474	4.97%	21,228	42.67%	49,750
Wayne	5,036	85.98%	717	12.24%	104	1.78%	4,319	73.74%	5,857
Weakley	9,008	73.93%	2,772	22.75%	404	3.32%	6,236	51.18%	12,184
White	7,671	78.08%	1,845	18.78%	309	3.14%	5,826	59.30%	9,825
Williamson	68,212	64.19%	31,013	29.18%	7,046	6.63%	37,199	35.01%	106,271
Wilson	39,406	69.46%	14,385	25.36%	2,943	5.18%	25,021	44.10%	56,734
Totals	1,522,925	60.72%	870,695	34.72%	114,407	4.56%	652,230	26.00%	2,508,027

==== Counties that flipped from Democratic to Republican ====
- Hardeman (largest city: Bolivar)

==== By congressional district ====
Trump won seven of nine congressional districts.

District	Trump	Clinton	Representative
1st	76.45%	19.61%	Phil Roe
2nd	64.71%	29.53%	Jimmy Duncan
3rd	65.07%	30.05%	Chuck Fleischmann
4th	68.19%	27.27%	Scott DesJarlais
5th	37.87%	56.06%	Jim Cooper
6th	72.34%	23.58%	Diane Black
7th	67.05%	28.03%	Marsha Blackburn
8th	66.06%	30.43%	Stephen Fincher
8th	66.06%	30.43%	David Kustoff
9th	20.03%	76.93%	Steve Cohen

== Analysis ==
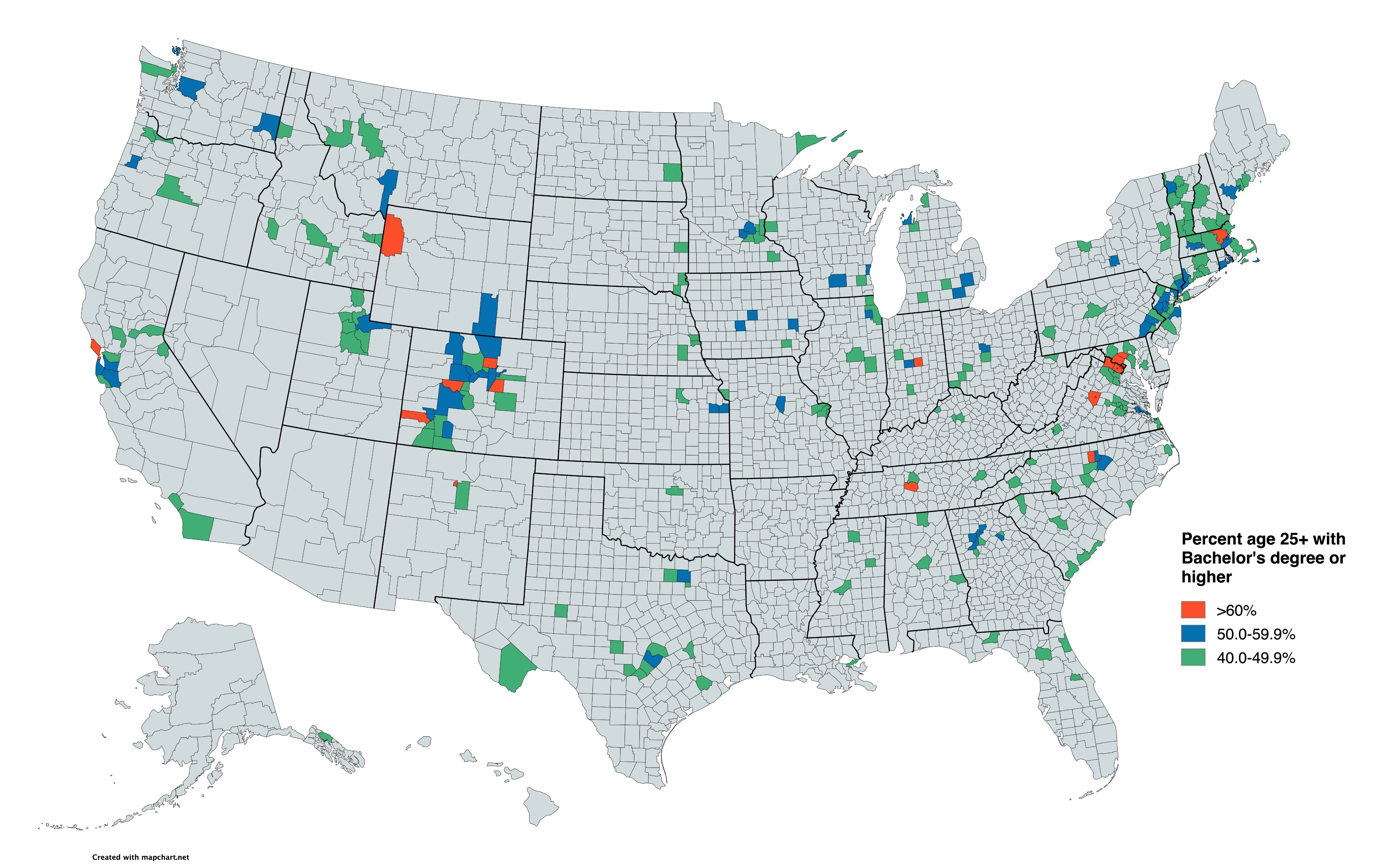
A map of the most college-educated counties in the United States

A Southern state in the heart of the Bible Belt, no Democrat has won Tennessee's electoral votes since Bill Clinton of neighboring Arkansas, who shared the ticket with favorite son Al Gore, in 1996, nor has it been contested at the presidential level since 2000, when Gore narrowly lost his home state by less than 4 points. The last Democratic presidential candidate to win at least 40% of the state vote was Barack Obama in 2008, and Republicans have occupied all statewide offices in Tennessee since 2011.

Despite losing the state, Clinton made large gains in Williamson County, Tennessee (home to Franklin, Tennessee), the most highly-educated and wealthiest county in the state. The county is also one of the most highly-educated counties in the country, with over 60% of adult residents having a Bachelor's degree (see the map). The county remained very red, giving Trump 64% of the vote, but shifted leftward by 11%. Clinton also gained in Davidson County, Tennessee (home to Nashville, Tennessee) and Knox County, Tennessee (home to Knoxville, Tennessee).

Winning Tennessee by 652,230 votes, Donald Trump achieved his second-largest margin of victory by vote count nationwide, surpassed only by the 807,179-vote margin in Texas. Trump significantly outperformed previous Republican candidates in rural areas, particularly in Appalachia and the rural regions of Middle and West Tennessee. Notably, Trump flipped rural Hardeman County, winning it by 734 votes, marking the first time since 1988 that the county voted for a Republican in a presidential race since. This marked the first presidential election since 1972 in which a nominee garnered over 60% of Tennessee's vote.

== See also ==
- First presidency of Donald Trump
- United States presidential elections in Tennessee
- 2016 Democratic Party presidential debates and forums
- 2016 Democratic Party presidential primaries
- 2016 Republican Party presidential debates and forums
- 2016 Republican Party presidential primaries
- 2016 Tennessee elections
