= First State Bank of Manlius =

- U.S. National Register of Historic Places
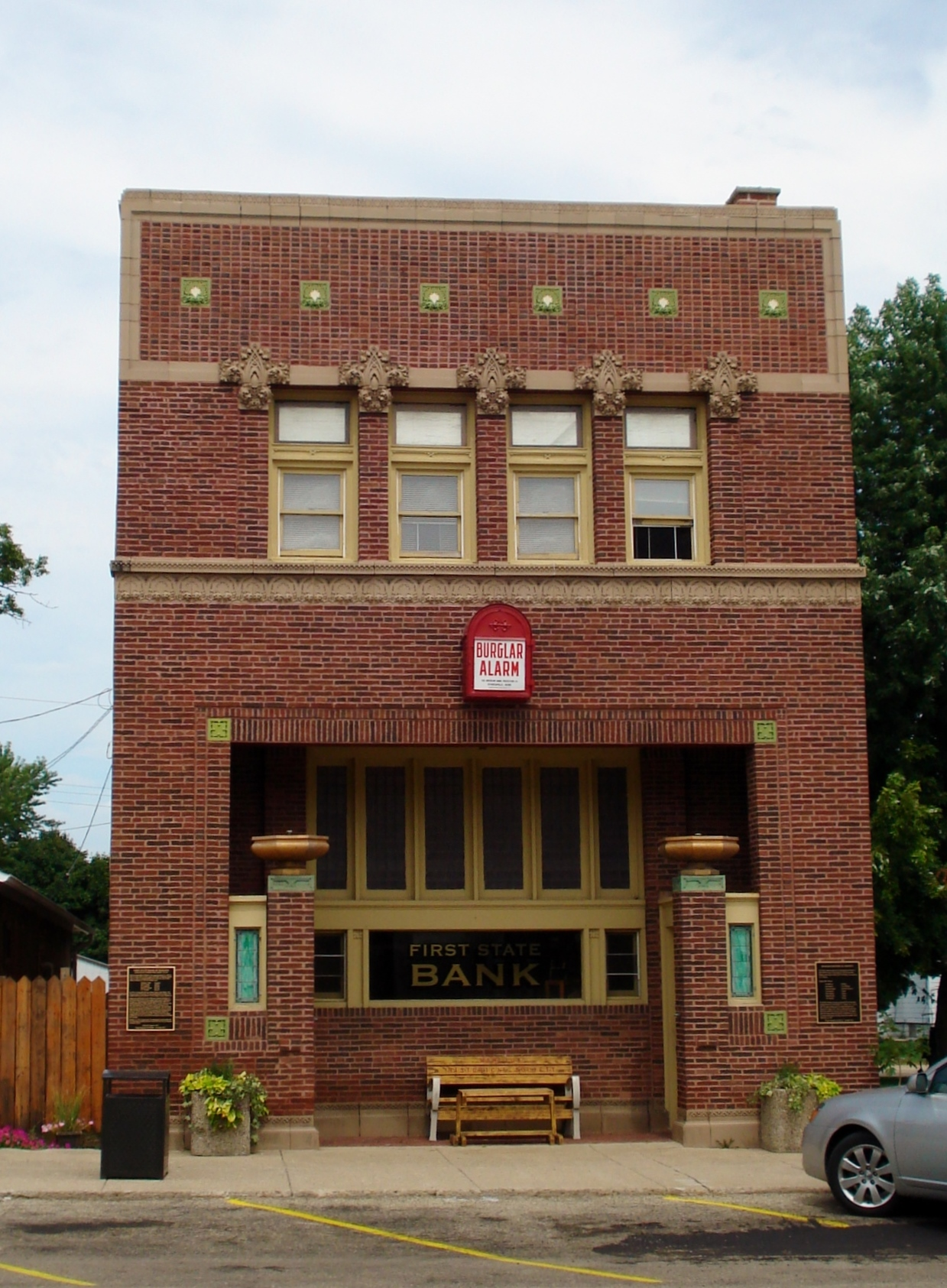

- Location within Illinois Location within the United States
- Location: N side of Maple St., Manlius, Illinois
- Coordinates: 41°27′24″N 89°40′11″W
- Area: 0.7 acres (0.28 ha)
- Built: 1915
- Architect: Berry, Parker
- NRHP reference No.: 75000639
- Added to NRHP: May 12, 1975

The First State Bank of Manlius is a historic bank building located on the north side of Maple Street in Manlius, Illinois. The building was constructed in 1915 from a design by Parker Berry, Louis Sullivan's chief draftsman at the time. Berry died of the Spanish flu at age 30 in 1918, and the bank is the only surviving example of a commercial building he designed. His design for the bank featured a red brick exterior with terra cotta ornamentation and piers topped with urns in front of the two side entrances. The bank failed in the Great Depression and subsequently became a vault for the village's other bank.

The bank was added to the National Register of Historic Places on May 12, 1975.
