= First State Bank (Edna, Kansas) =

Bank in Kansas, U.S.

- U.S. National Register of Historic Places
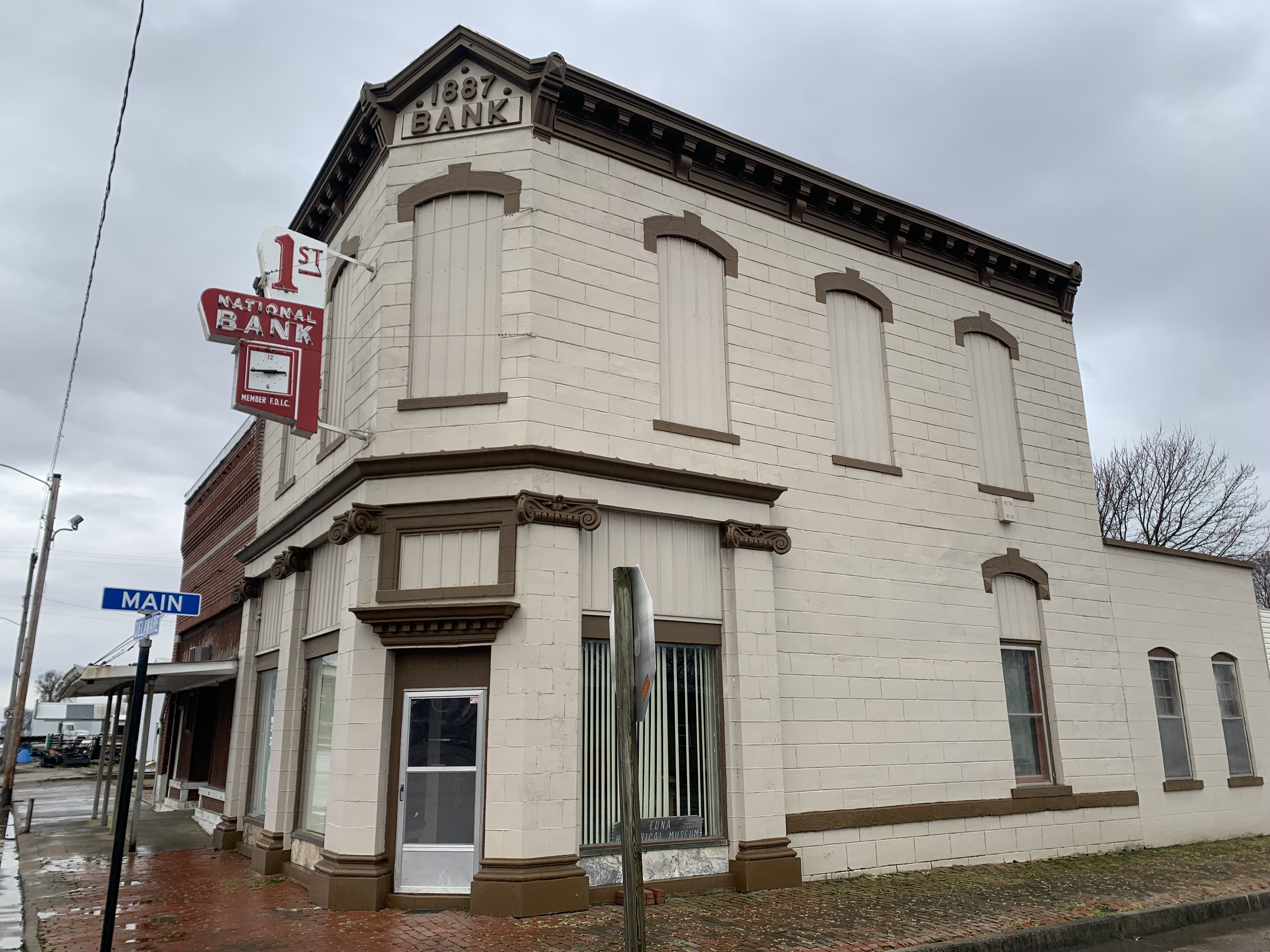
- Historic Bank in Edna, Kansas

- Location within Kansas Location within the United States
- Location: Southwest corner of Delaware and Main Sts., Edna, Kansas
- Coordinates: 37°03′24″N 95°21′34″W
- Area: Less than one acre
- Built: 1887
- Architectural style: Classical Revival
- NRHP reference No.: 82000417
- Added to NRHP: November 1, 1982

The First State Bank in Edna, Kansas, is a Classical Revival-style bank built in 1887. It was listed on the National Register of Historic Places in 1982. It is located at the southwest corner of Delaware and Main Streets in Edna.

The main block of the building is 40 by 27 feet (12.2 m × 8.2 m) in plan. in 1912 a 16 by 27 feet (4.9 m × 8.2 m) one-story extension was added to the rear, and a 1958 modification added a 12 by 13 feet (3.7 m × 4.0 m) area.
