= Mike McWherter =

American politician (born 1955)

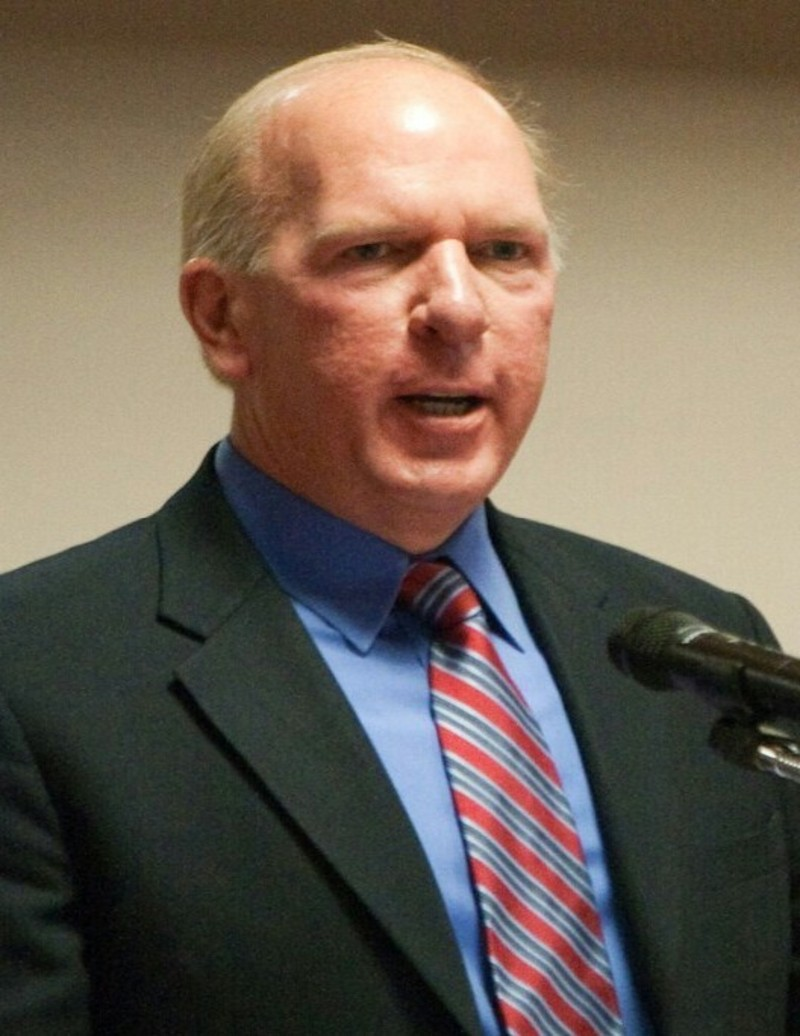
- McWherter in 2010

Personal details
- Born: 1955 (age 70–71)
- Party: Democratic
- Relatives: Ned McWherter (father)
- Education: Vanderbilt University (BA, JD)

Michael Ray McWherter is an American lawyer, businessman and politician from the state of Tennessee. He was the Democratic nominee for Governor of Tennessee in 2010.

== Early life, education and career ==
The son of former Tennessee governor Ned McWherter, McWherter is a native of West Tennessee. He graduated from Union City High School, and planned on attending Rice University before changing his mind. McWherter earned his Bachelor of Arts and Juris Doctor from Vanderbilt University, after which he worked in private practice in Nashville. He later moved to Jackson to start his own business.

McWherter operates the family's beer distribution business in Jackson. He is also the chairman of the board of First State Bank, headquartered in Union City, and serves on the board of directors for the Jackson Energy Authority.

== Political career ==
Although he has never held elected office, McWherter made an attempt to challenge Republican U.S. Senator Lamar Alexander in the 2008 election. He opted out over fundraising concerns and an intense campaign season.

=== 2010 Tennessee gubernatorial campaign ===
On April 23, 2009, he announced he would run for Governor of Tennessee in the 2010 election. McWherter said he will run on a platform of jobs, education and fiscal responsibility. Incumbent Tennessee governor, Phil Bredesen, endorsed McWherter's candidacy.

He was reported as supporting a ban on unmarried (including gay) couples adopting children, indicating that he feels "having parents of the opposite sex is better for a child." In the same interview he also agreed that "foster care by an opposite-sex couple was better than adoption by a same-sex couple."

McWherter supports teaching intelligent design creationism in schools alongside scientific evolution. Asked about teaching intelligent design at a debate, he replied, "I think there's a place to talk about evolution in our public schools, but I prefer a more traditional curriculum. We can blend science and religion in that regard."

McWherter was defeated in the general election by Bill Haslam.

McWherter announced on September 6, 2013, that he would not contest a second gubernatorial run in 2014.

== Personal life ==
McWherter lives in Jackson with his wife, Mary Jane, their son Walker, and daughter Bess.

Party political offices
Preceded by Phil Bredesen	Democratic nominee for Governor of Tennessee; 2010	Succeeded by Charles Brown
