= Mitchell Building-First State Bank Building =

- U.S. National Register of Historic Places
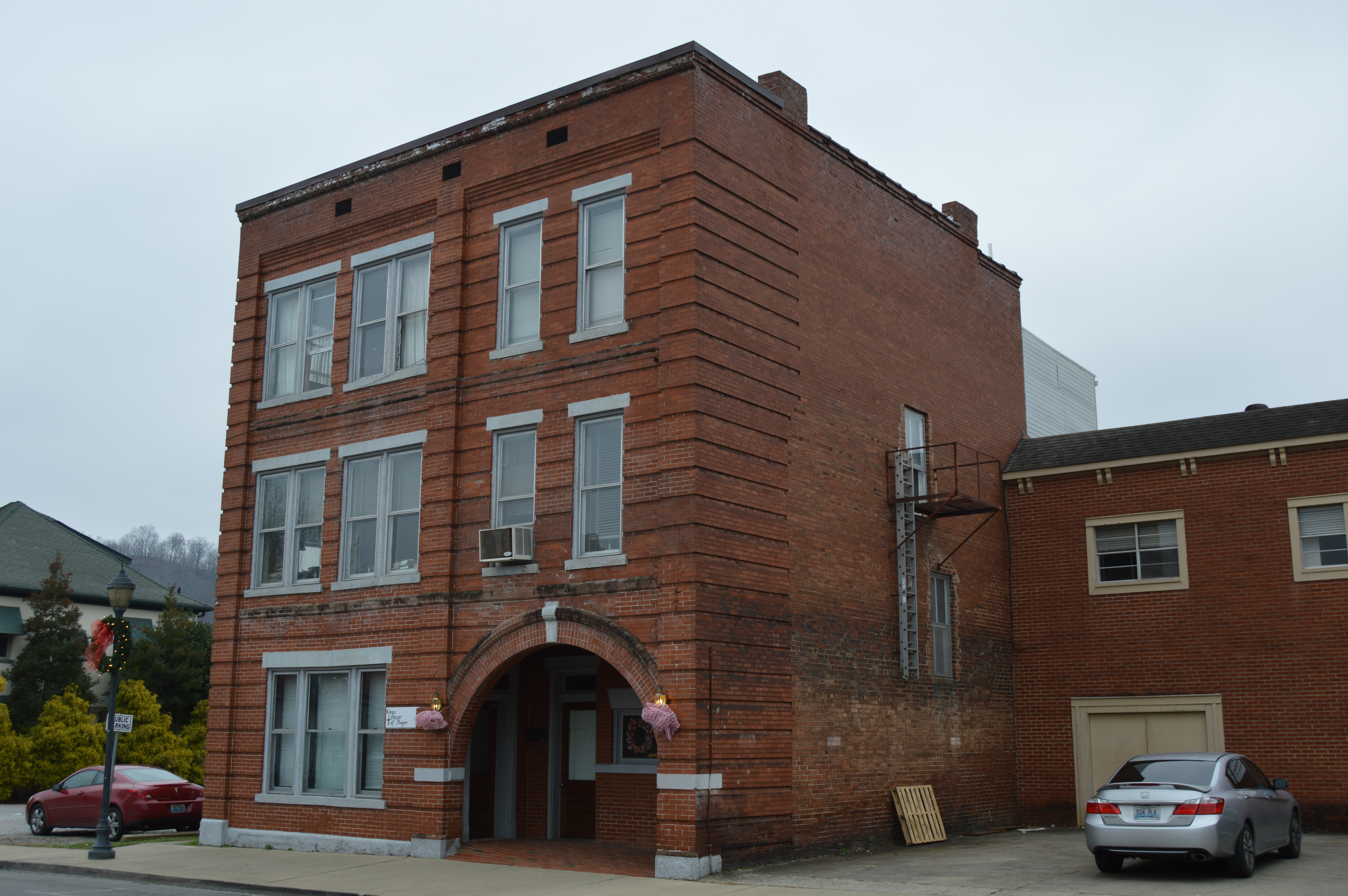

- Location within Kentucky Location within the United States
- Location: 222 Knox St., Barbourville, Kentucky
- Coordinates: 36°52′01″N 83°53′12″W
- Area: 0.1 acres (0.040 ha)
- Built: 1910
- Built by: Ed Dishman
- Architect: Ed Dishman
- Architectural style: Romanesque Revival
- NRHP reference No.: 84002751
- Added to NRHP: August 1, 1984

The Mitchell Building-First State Bank Building, at 222 Knox Street in Barbourville, Kentucky, is a Romanesque Revival-style building built in 1910. It was listed on the National Register of Historic Places in 1984.

It is a three-story masonry wall and wood-frame building, with a Romanesque brick arch entry as its most salient feature. The brickwork is in common bond with a quoin detail every sixth course. It was designed and built by Ed Dishman.

It was deemed notable as "the best example of the Romanesque Revival style in Barbourville."
