= Dayspring Bank =

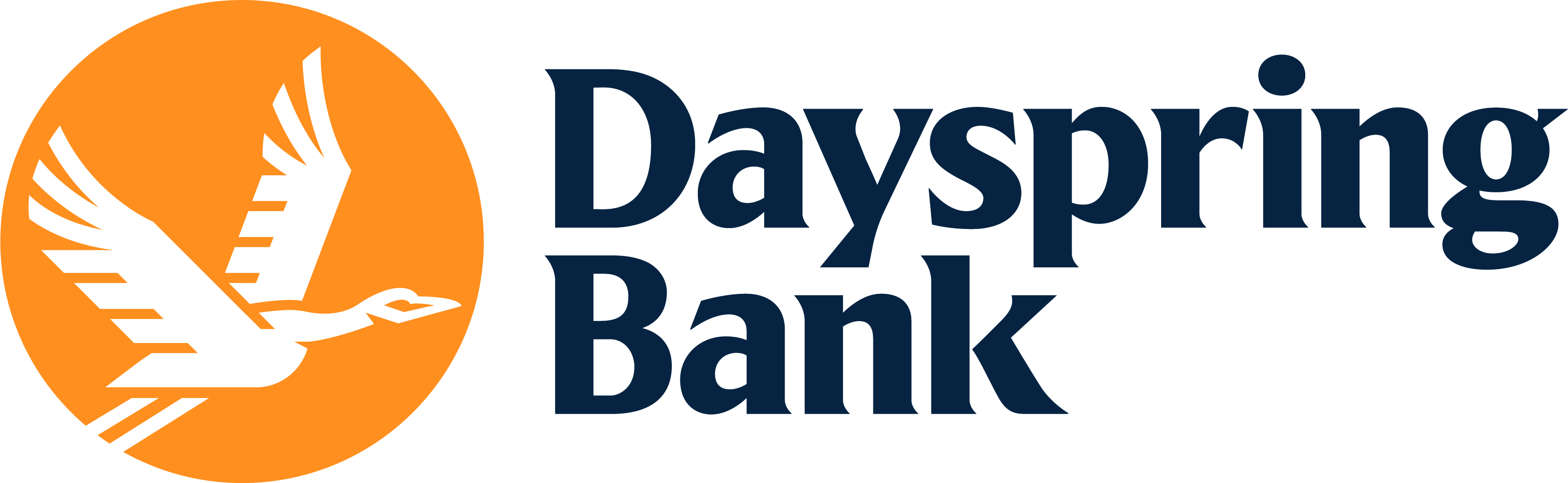
- Company type: Private
- Industry: Finance and Insurance
- Founded: Gothenburg, Nebraska; February 1906
- Headquarters: Gothenburg, Nebraska, United States
- Number of locations: 8
- Products: Financial services
- Total assets: $1,200,000,000
- Number of employees: 100
- Website: https://dayspring.bank
- Footnotes / references For Whatever the Day Brings

Dayspring Bank is a state chartered regional community bank that has eight locations throughout Nebraska, with its headquarters located in Gothenburg. Other branches are located in Mullen, North Platte, Wallace, and the Omaha Metro. As of December 31, 2025, Dayspring Bank was sitting at $1.2 billion in assets.

The bank was chartered in 1906 with the name Citizens National Bank. In 1915 the bank name was changed to First State Bank and in 2023 it was changed to Dayspring Bank.

Bank Locations

- 914 Lake Avenue, Gothenburg NE 69138
- 605 10th Street, Gothenburg NE 69138
- 101 NW 1st Street, Mullen NE 69152
- 410 Rodeo Road, North Platte NE 69101
- 5370 S 72nd Street, Ralston NE 68127
- 9831 S 96th St, Papillion NE 68046
- 11910 Standing Stone Drive, Gretna, NE 68028
- 234 S Commercial Avenue, Wallace NE 69169

Philanthropy

- 2023
  - Dayspring donated $1,050,000 towards The Impact Center that is being built in Gothenburg, Nebraska.
