= First State Bank of Chester =

- U.S. National Register of Historic Places
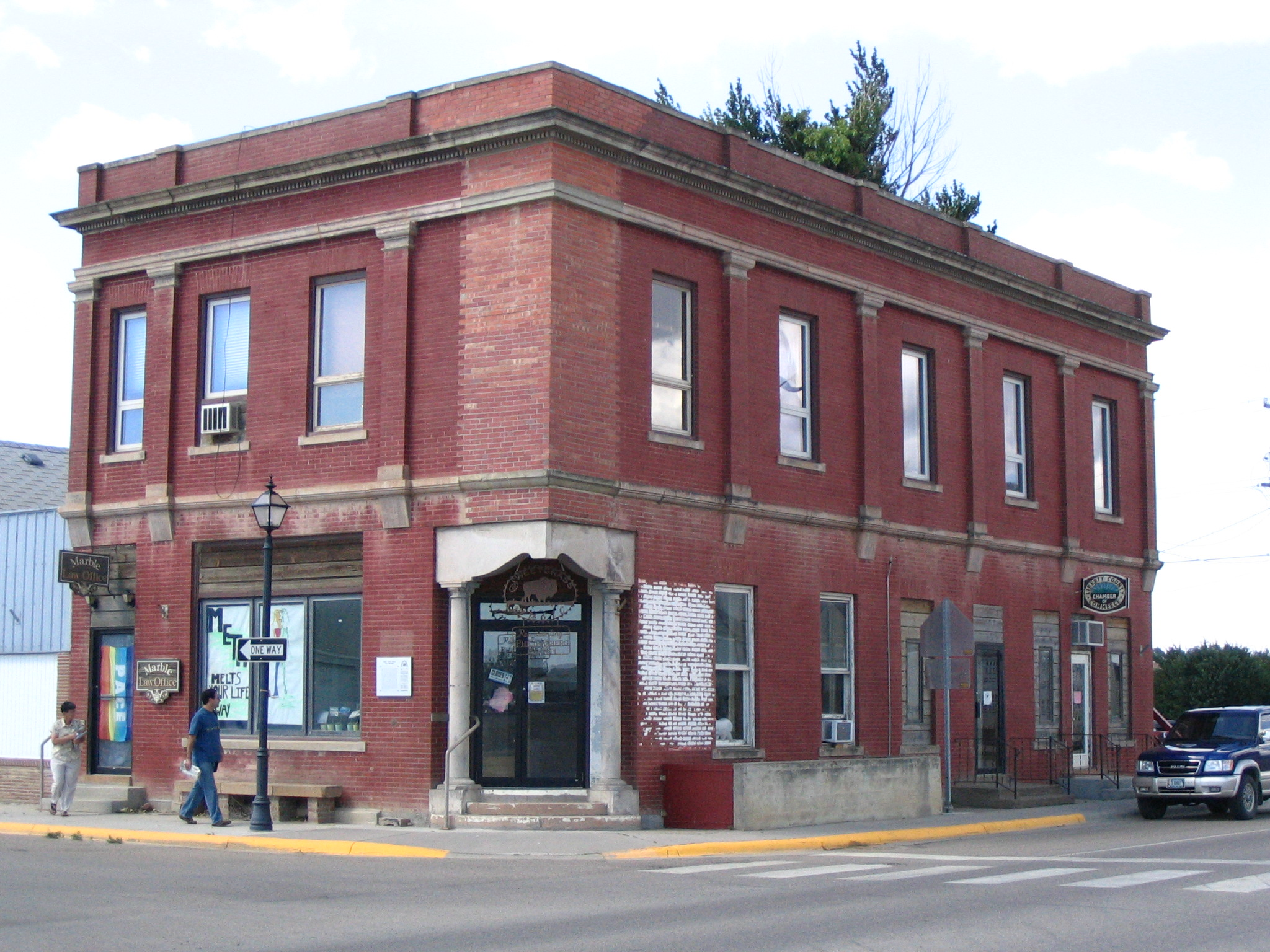

- Location within Montana Location within the United States
- Location: Junction of Washington Ave. and 1st St.
- Coordinates: 48°30′47″N 110°57′52″W
- Built: 1910
- Architect: R. T. Frost
- Architectural style: Williston Construction Company
- NRHP reference No.: 97000975
- Added to NRHP: August 29, 1997

The First State Bank of Chester is a historic bank building located at the intersection of Washington Avenue and 1st Street East in Chester, Montana. Opened in 1910, the same year Chester was incorporated, the bank was the first in the city. The Williston Construction Company built the red brick building, which was described as the most architecturally exquisite building in the town upon its completion. The architect was R. T. Frost, leading architect of Minot, North Dakota. Available land and steady rainfall made the area's newly settled farmers prosperous, and they used the bank to both hold their earnings and take out loans for new equipment. Droughts in the lat 1910s reversed the fortunes of many of these farmers, however, and like many others across the state the bank closed in 1920. Since then, the building has been used for a variety of commercial and residential purposes; it also housed Chester's hospital from the 1920s through the 1940s.

The building was added to the National Register of Historic Places on August 29, 1997.
