= 2010 Tennessee elections =

Tennessee state elections in 2010 were held on Tuesday, November 2, 2010. Primary elections for the United States House of Representatives, governorship, Tennessee Senate, and Tennessee House of Representatives, as well as various judicial retention elections, were held on August 5, 2010. There was also a constitutional amendment to the Constitution of Tennessee on the November 2 ballot.

== United States Congress ==
=== House of Representatives ===
District results: Republican: 50–60%; 60–70%; 70–80%; 80–90%; Democratic: 50–60%; 70–80%

Tennessee elected nine U.S. Representatives, each representing one of Tennessee's nine Congressional Districts.

=== Results ===
District	Republican		Democratic		Others		Total		Result
District	Votes	%	Votes	%	Votes	%	Votes	%	Result
District 1	123,006	80.84%	26,045	17.12%	3,110	2.04%	152,161	100.0%	Republican hold
District 2	141,796	81.78%	25,400	14.65%	6,184	3.57%	173,380	100.0%	Republican hold
District 3	92,032	56.79%	45,387	28.01%	24,637	15.20%	162,056	100.0%	Republican hold
District 4	103,969	57.07%	70,254	38.56%	7,968	4.37%	182,191	100.0%	Republican gain
District 5	74,204	42.07%	99,162	56.23%	2,996	1.70%	176,362	100.0%	Democratic hold
District 6	128,517	67.26%	56,145	29.38%	6,422	3.36%	191,084	100.0%	Republican gain
District 7	158,916	72.37%	54,347	24.75%	6,320	2.88%	219,583	100.0%	Republican hold
District 8	98,759	58.99%	64,960	38.80%	3,686	2.20%	167,405	100.0%	Republican gain
District 9	33,879	25.11%	99,827	74.00%	1,201	0.89%	134,907	100.0%	Democratic hold
Total	955,078	61.26%	541,527	34.73%	62,524	4.01%	1,559,129	100.0%	

Popular vote
Republican	61.26%
Democratic	34.73%
Other	4.01%

House seats
Republican	77.78%
Democratic	22.22%

== Gubernatorial ==
Final results by county: Haslam: 50–60%; 60–70%; 70–80%; 80–90%; McWherter: 40–50%; 50–60%

Incumbent Democratic governor Phil Bredesen was term-limited, and is prohibited by the Constitution of Tennessee from seeking a third consecutive term. Knoxville mayor and Republican nominee, Bill Haslam was elected with 65.0% of the vote, defeating Democratic nominee Mike McWherter.

=== Results ===
Tennessee gubernatorial election, 2010
Party	Candidate	Votes	%	±%
Republican	Bill Haslam	1,041,545	65.03%	+35.83%
Democratic	Mike McWherter	529,851	33.08%	−35.24%
Independent	Carl Twofeathers Whitaker	6,536	0.41%	N/A
Independent	Brandon Dodds	4,728	0.29%	N/A
Independent	Bayron Binkley	4,663	0.29%	N/A
Independent	June Griffin	2,587	0.16%	N/A
Independent	Linda Kay Perry	2,057	0.13%	N/A
Independent	Howard M. Switzer	1,887	0.12%	N/A
Independent	Samuel David Duck	1,755	0.11%	N/A
Independent	Thomas Smith II	1,207	0.07%	N/A
Independent	Toni K. Hall	993	0.06%	N/A
Independent	David Gatchell	859	0.05%	N/A
Independent	Boyce T. McCall	828	0.05%	N/A
Independent	James Reesor	809	0.05%	N/A
Independent	Mike Knois	600	0.03%	N/A
Independent	Donald Ray McFolin	583	0.03%	N/A
Independent	Write-Ins (3 candidates)	61	0.003%	N/A
Majority		511,694	32.21%	−6.64%
Turnout		1,601,567		
Republican gain from Democratic		Swing		

(Percentages are rounded to the nearest 1/100th, they will not add up fully to 100%).

August 5, 2010, primary results

Democratic primary results
Party	Candidate	Votes	%
Democratic	Mike McWherter	284,894	100.00%
Total votes		284,894	100.00%

County results

Republican primary results
Party	Candidate	Votes	%
Republican	Bill Haslam	341,229	47.34%
Republican	Zach Wamp	210,332	29.18%
Republican	Ron Ramsey	158,960	22.05%
Republican	Joe Kirkpatrick	6,775	0.94%
Republican	Basil Marceaux	3,508	0.49%
Total votes		720,804	100.00%

== State legislature ==
=== State Senate ===
Results by senate districts

Winners:

Republican hold
Democratic hold
Republican gain
No election

Elections for 17 of the 33 seats in Tennessee's State Senate were held on November 2, 2010.

After this election, Republicans had 20 seats while Democrats had 13 seats, with Republicans gaining one seat.

=== State House of Representatives ===
Results by State House districts

Winners:

Republican hold
Democratic hold
Independent Republican hold
Republican gain

The election of all 99 seats in the Tennessee House of Representatives occurred on November 2, 2010.

Republicans won 64 seats, while Democrats won 34 seats, and Independents won 1 seat. Republicans gained fourteen seats during this election.

== Ballot measure ==
Hunting Rights Amendment
- Shall Article XI, Section 13 of the Constitution of the State of Tennessee be amended by adding the following sentences at the end of the section: The citizens of this state shall have the personal right to hunt and fish, subject to reasonable regulations and restrictions prescribed by law. The recognition of this right does not abrogate any private or public property rights, nor does it limit the state's power to regulate commercial activity. Traditional manners and means may be used to take non-threatened species.

Results
Choice	Votes	%
Yes	1,289,544	89.74%
No	147,506	10.26%
Valid votes	1,437,050	100.00%
Invalid or blank votes	0	0.00%
Total votes	1,437,050	100.00%
- Results by county Yes 90–100% 80–90%

This proposed measure called for the personal right to hunt and fish within state laws and existing property rights. Additionally, the amendment allowed for hunting and fishing of non-threatened species.

== Local elections ==
=== Knox County ===
Incumbent Republican Mayor Mike Ragsdale could not run for re-election due to term limits. Republican state senator, Tim Burchett, won the election with 88.3% of the vote against Democrat Ezra Maize.

=== Results ===
August 5, 2010 General election results
Party	Candidate	Votes	%
Republican	Tim Burchett	53,381	88.30%
Democratic	Ezra Maize	4,917	8.13%
Independent	Lewis F. Cosby	1,374	2.27%
Independent	Robert H. "Hub" Bedwell	784	1.30%
Total votes		60,456	100.00%

May 4, 2010, primary results

Democratic primary results
Party	Candidate	Votes	%
Democratic	Ezra Maize	1,318	57.11%
Democratic	Michael J. McBath	990	42.89%
Total votes		2,308	100.00%

Republican primary results
Party	Candidate	Votes	%
Republican	Tim Burchett	29,716	85.14%
Republican	Tim Hutchison	5,187	14.86%
Total votes		34,903	100.00%

=== Shelby County ===
Incumbent Democratic Mayor Joe Ford, who took office on December 10, 2009, upon the resignation of A C Wharton, ran for a full term. Republican County Sheriff Mark Luttrell was elected mayor with 57.9% of the vote, defeating Democratic Mayor Joe Ford.

General election results
Party	Candidate	Votes	%
Republican	Mark Luttrell	102,295	57.86%
Democratic	Joe Ford (incumbent)	73,518	41.58%
Independent	Leo Awgowhat	997	0.56%
Total votes		176,810	100.00%
Republican gain from Democratic			

=== Clarksville ===
Incumbent mayor Johnny Piper decided not to run for a third term. Democratic candidate Kim McMillan won the election with 48.2% of the vote.

November 2, 2010 Clarksville Mayor Election
Candidate	Votes	%
Kim McMillan	10,271	48.16%
Jeff Burkhart	8,042	37.71%
Gabriel Segovia	1,112	5.21%
Keith Fain	772	3.62%
Shirley J. Braxton	516	2.42%
Cesar Gabriel Barraza	243	1.14%
Jon Lockwood	167	0.78%
Michael Flood	148	0.68%
Write-ins	56	0.26%
Total	21,327	100.00%

== See also ==
- Elections in Tennessee
- Political party strength in Tennessee
- Tennessee Democratic Party
- Tennessee Republican Party
- Government of Tennessee
- 2010 United States elections
