= National Register of Historic Places listings in Toombs County, Georgia =

This is a list of properties and districts in Toombs County, Georgia that are listed on the National Register of Historic Places (NRHP).

This National Park Service list is complete through NPS recent listings posted March 21, 2025.

== Current listings ==
	Name on the Register	Image	Date listed	Location	City or town	Description
1	Crawford W. Brazell House	Crawford W. Brazell House	June 17, 1982 (#82002486)	607 Jackson St. 32°12′41″N 82°24′55″W	Vidalia	Now the Altama Museum of Art & History
2	Citizens Bank of Vidalia	Citizens Bank of Vidalia	January 22, 1992 (#91002004)	117 SE. Main St. 32°13′06″N 82°24′42″W	Vidalia	Also part of the Vidalia Commercial Historic District
3	Robert and Missouri Garbutt House	Robert and Missouri Garbutt House	December 28, 2000 (#00001564)	700 W. Liberty St. (corner with Bulldog Rd.); 32°12′04″N 82°19′48″W	Lyons	
4	Leader-Rosansky House	Leader-Rosansky House	June 20, 1995 (#95000735)	403 Jackson St. 32°12′52″N 82°24′50″W	Vidalia	
5	Lyons Woman's Club House	Lyons Woman's Club House	May 2, 1985 (#85000940)	East Liberty St. 32°12′10″N 82°19′13″W	Lyons	
6	McLemore-Sharpe Farmstead	McLemore-Sharpe Farmstead	August 19, 1982 (#82002487)	SW of Vidalia on GA 130; 32°11′36″N 82°26′04″W	Vidalia	
7	Peterson-Wilbanks House	Peterson-Wilbanks House	March 22, 1990 (#90000491)	404 Jackson St. 32°12′50″N 82°24′47″W	Vidalia	
8	Jim Smith House	Jim Smith House	August 31, 1989 (#89001213)	Rt. 3/Toombs County Rd. 18; 32°01′03″N 82°15′09″W	Lyons	
9	Vidalia Commercial Historic District	Vidalia Commercial Historic District	September 27, 1996 (#96001020)	Roughly bounded by Meadow, Jackson, Pine, and Thompson Sts. 32°13′21″N 82°24′47″W	Vidalia	
