= Citizens Bank =

Citizens Bank may refer to:

== Financial institutions ==
All in the United States

- Citizens Bank, N.A., a bank operating in 11 northeastern states, based in Rhode Island and owned by Citizens Financial Group
- Citizens Bank of Amarillo, a network of community banks based in Texas
- Citizens Business Bank, headquartered in California

=== Defunct ===
- Citizens Bank of Maryland, a former bank based in Laurel, Maryland (1928–1997)
- Citizens Bank of Northern California, a former bank based in Nevada City, California (1995–2011)
- Citizens Republic Bancorp, a former bank based in Flint, Michigan (1871–2013)

== Structures ==
All in the United States

- Citizens Bank Park, a baseball stadium in Philadelphia, Pennsylvania
- Citizens Bank Financial Center, in Wilkes-Barre, Pennsylvania

=== Historical ===
Each listed on the U.S. National Register of Historic Places

- Citizens Bank (Williston, Florida)
- Citizens Bank (South Bend, Indiana)
- Citizens Bank Building (Burnsville, North Carolina)
- Citizens Bank Building (Stillwater, Oklahoma)
- Citizens Bank of Lafourche, in Louisiana
- Citizens Bank of Vidalia, in Georgia
- Citizens Banking Company, in Baxley, Georgia

== See also ==
- Citizens Bank Building (disambiguation)
- Citizens National Bank (disambiguation)
- Citizens Savings and Loan Association (disambiguation)
- Citizens State Bank (disambiguation)
