= Citizens Bank Building =

Citizens Bank Building may refer to:

- Citizens Bank Building (Tampa, Florida)
- Citizens Bank (Williston, Florida), listed on the NRHP in Florida
- Citizens Bank of Vidalia, Vidalia, Georgia, listed on the NRHP in Georgia
- Citizens Banking Company, Baxley, Georgia, listed on the NRHP in Georgia
- Citizens Bank (South Bend, Indiana), listed on the NRHP in Indiana
- Citizens Bank of Lafourche, Thibodaux, Louisiana, listed on the NRHP in Louisiana
- Citizens Bank Building (Burnsville, North Carolina), listed on the NRHP in North Carolina
- Citizens Bank and Trust Company Building, Former, Waynesville, North Carolina, listed on the NRHP in North Carolina
- Citizens Bank Building (Stillwater, Oklahoma), listed on the NRHP in Oklahoma
- Bank of Dyersburg, Dyersburg, Tennessee, formerly or also known as Citizens Bank Building, NRHP-listed in Dyer County
- Citizens Bank (Clinton, Wisconsin), listed on the NRHP in Wisconsin

== See also ==
- Citizens Bank (disambiguation)
