= Sharpe House =

Sharpe House may refer to:

- Parnell-Sharpe House, McGehee, Arkansas, listed on the National Register of Historic Places in Desha County, Arkansas
- McLemore-Sharpe Farmstead, Vidalia, Georgia, listed on the National Register of Historic Places in Toombs County, Georgia
- Sharpe Homestead and Cemetery, Defreestville, New York, listed on the National Register of Historic Places in Rensselaer County, New York
- Sharpe-Gentry Farm, Propst Crossroads, North Carolina, listed on the National Register of Historic Places in Catawba County, North Carolina
- Col. Silas Alexander Sharpe House, Statesville, North Carolina, listed on the National Register of Historic Places in Iredell County, North Carolina

== See also ==
- Sharp House (disambiguation)
