= Citizens State Bank =

Citizens State Bank or Citizen's State Bank may refer to:

- Citizens State Bank (Gooding, Idaho), listed on the NRHP in Idaho
- Citizens State Bank (Lagro, Indiana), listed on the NRHP in Indiana
- Citizens State Bank (Odenton, Maryland), listed on the NRHP in Maryland
- Citizens State Bank (Edmond, Oklahoma), listed on the NRHP in Oklahoma
- Citizen's State Bank (Marble City, Oklahoma), listed on the NRHP in Oklahoma
- Citizens State Bank (Oklahoma City, Oklahoma), listed on the NRHP in Oklahoma
- Citizens State Bank of Henry, listed on the NRHP in South Dakota
- Citizens State Bank of Gillett, listed on the NRHP in Wisconsin

== See also ==
- Citizens Bank (disambiguation)
