= Citizens National Bank =

Citizens National Bank may refer to:

== Banks ==
- Citizens National Bank (Eastern Kentucky), headquartered in Paintsville, Kentucky
- Citizens National Bank (Laurel, Maryland)
- Citizens National Bank (Flint, Michigan), later part of Citizens Republic Bancorp

== Buildings ==
- Citizens National Bank Building (Glenwood Springs, Colorado), listed on the National Register of Historic Places (NRHP)
- Citizens National Bank (Evansville, Indiana), a property listed on the NRHP
- Citizens' National Bank (Worthington, Minnesota), listed on the NRHP in Nobles County
- Citizens National Bank (Springville, New York), a property listed on the NRHP in Erie County
- Citizens National Bank of Latrobe, Pennsylvania, listed on the NRHP
- Citizens National Bank (Martinsburg, West Virginia), a property listed on the NRHP
- Citizens National Bank (Parkersburg, West Virginia), a property listed on the NRHP

== See also ==
- Citizens Bank (disambiguation)
