= Peterson-Wilbanks House =

Historic house in Georgia, United States

- Peterson--Wilbanks House
- U.S. National Register of Historic Places
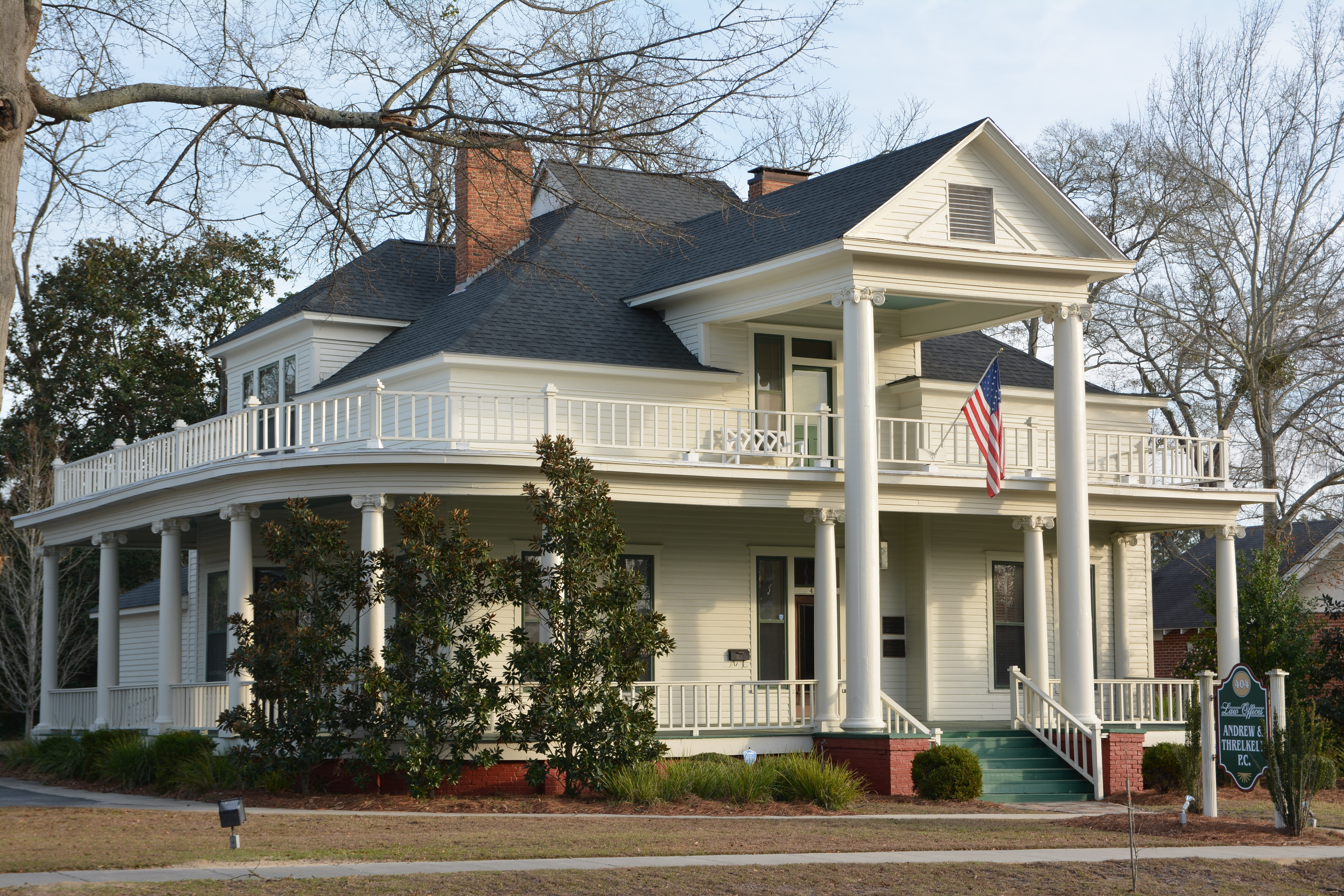
- House in 2017

- Location within Georgia
- Location: 404 Jackson St., Vidalia, Georgia
- Coordinates: 32°12′50″N 82°24′49″W
- Area: less than one acre
- Built: 1916
- Architect: Ivey P. Crutchfield
- Architectural style: Classical Revival
- NRHP reference No.: 90000491
- Added to NRHP: March 22, 1990

The Peterson-Wilbanks House is a Classical Revival house in Vidalia, Georgia. It was listed on the National Register of Historic Places in 1990.

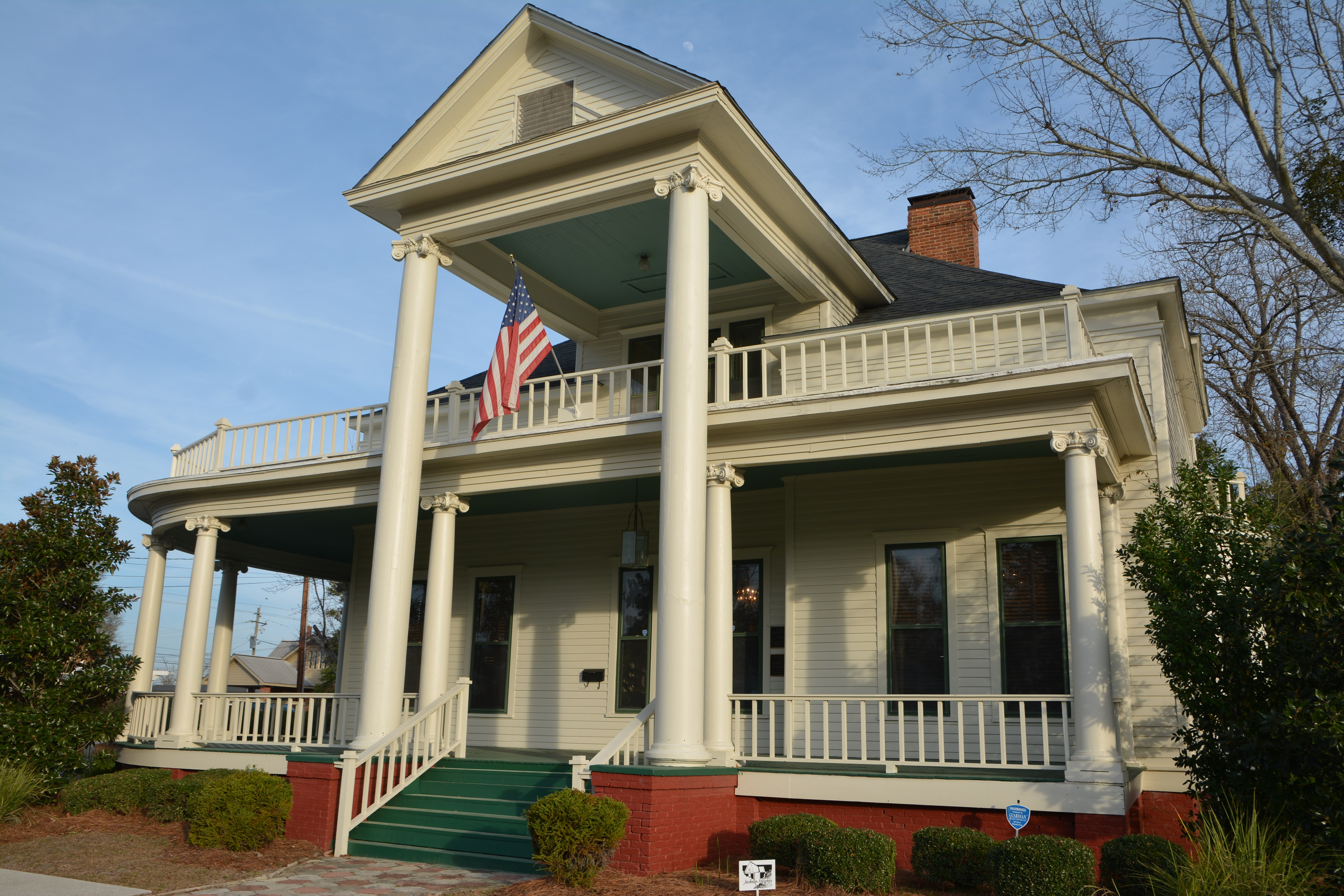
Front detail

It was designed and built by regional architect-builder Ivey P. Crutchfield (1878-1952).

It was deemed notable as "a good vernacular or small-town example of the Neoclassical style which had become prevalent or popular in American architecture at the turn of the [20th] century".

Almost directly across the street is the Leader-Rosansky House and nearby is the Crawford W. Brazell House, both also designed by Ivey P. Crutchfield and listed on the NRHP.
