= Ivey P. Crutchfield =

American architect

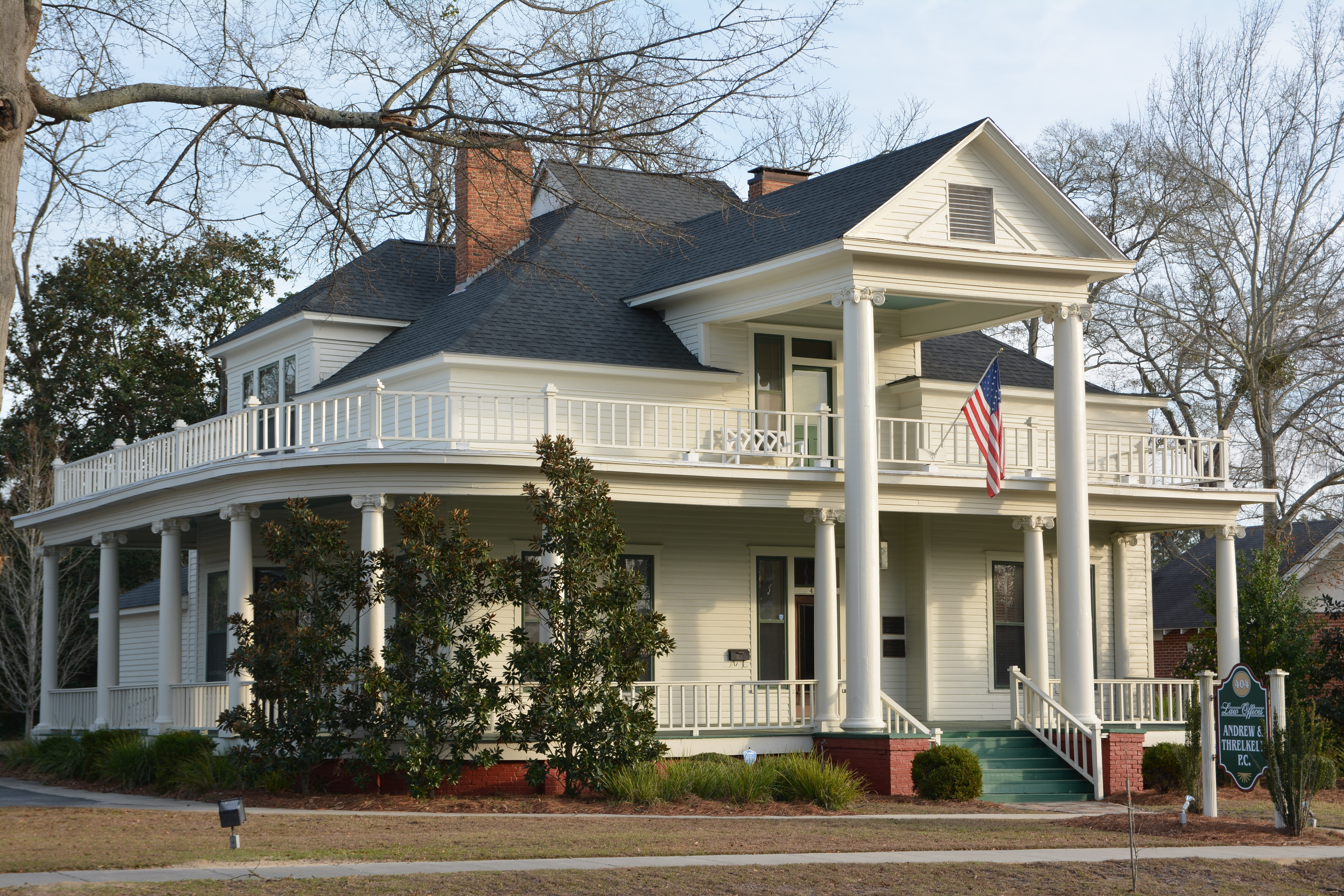
Peterson-Wilbanks House

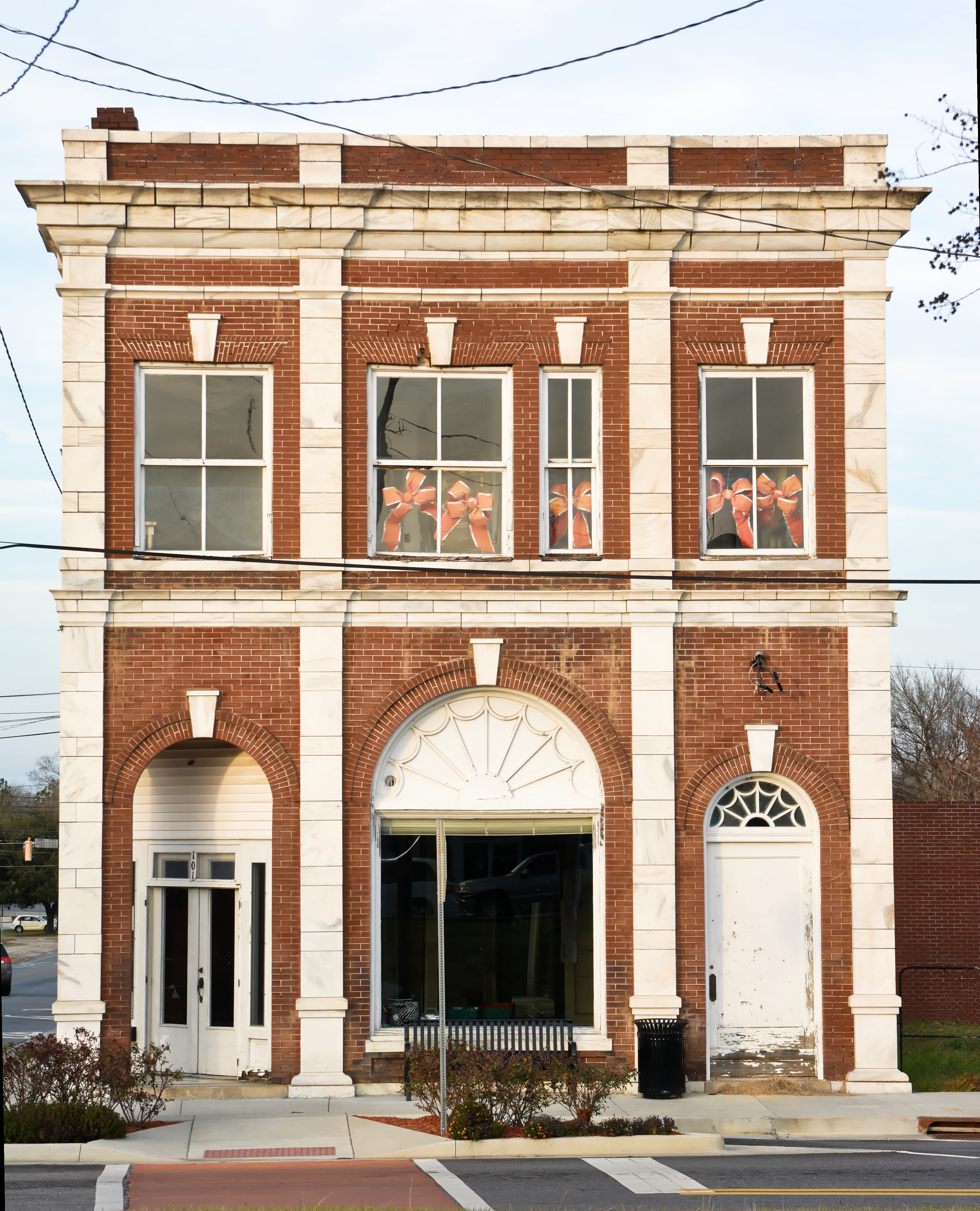
The First National Bank of Vidalia, Georigia, designed by Crutchfield, built in 1910

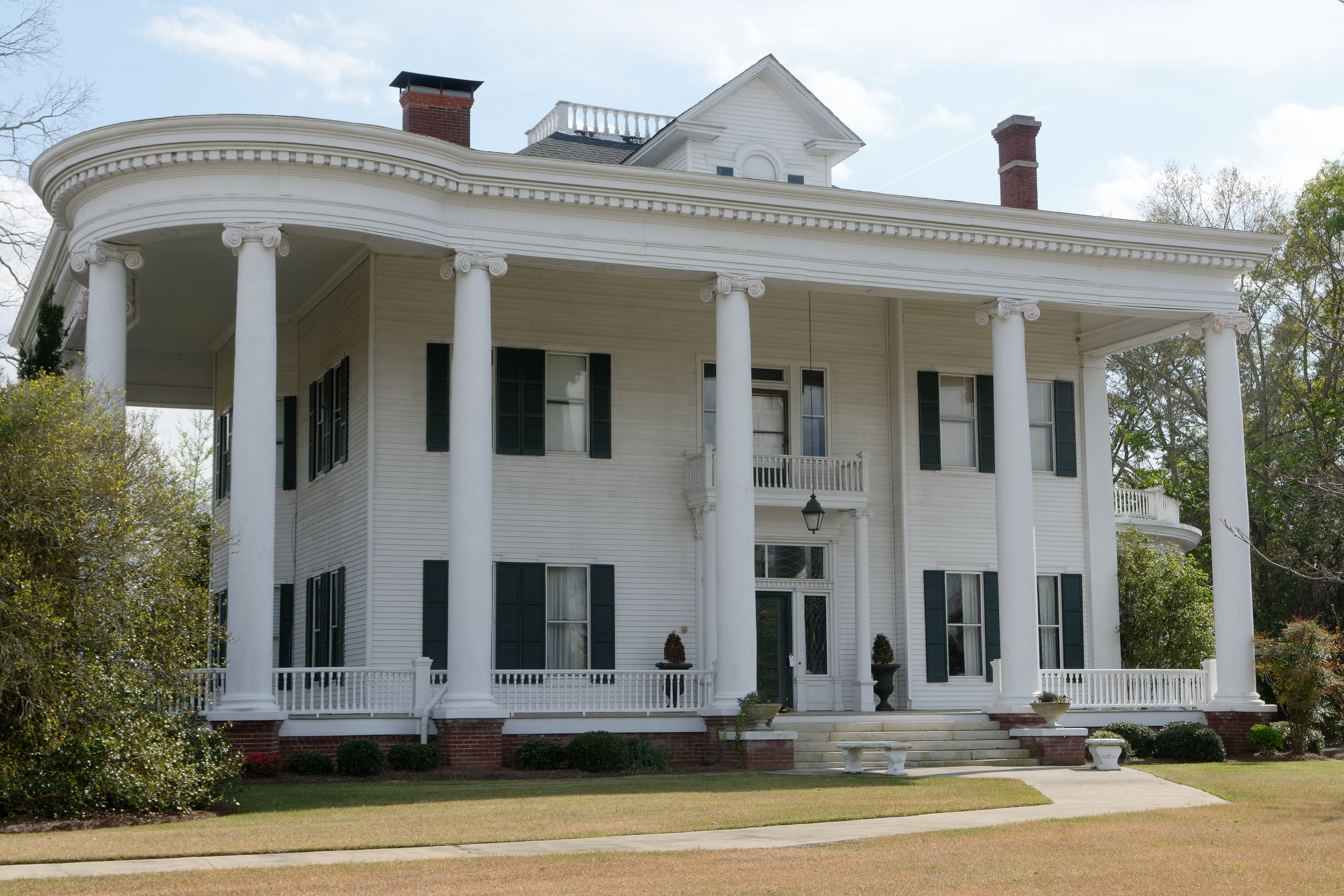
Garbutt house, Lyons, Georgia

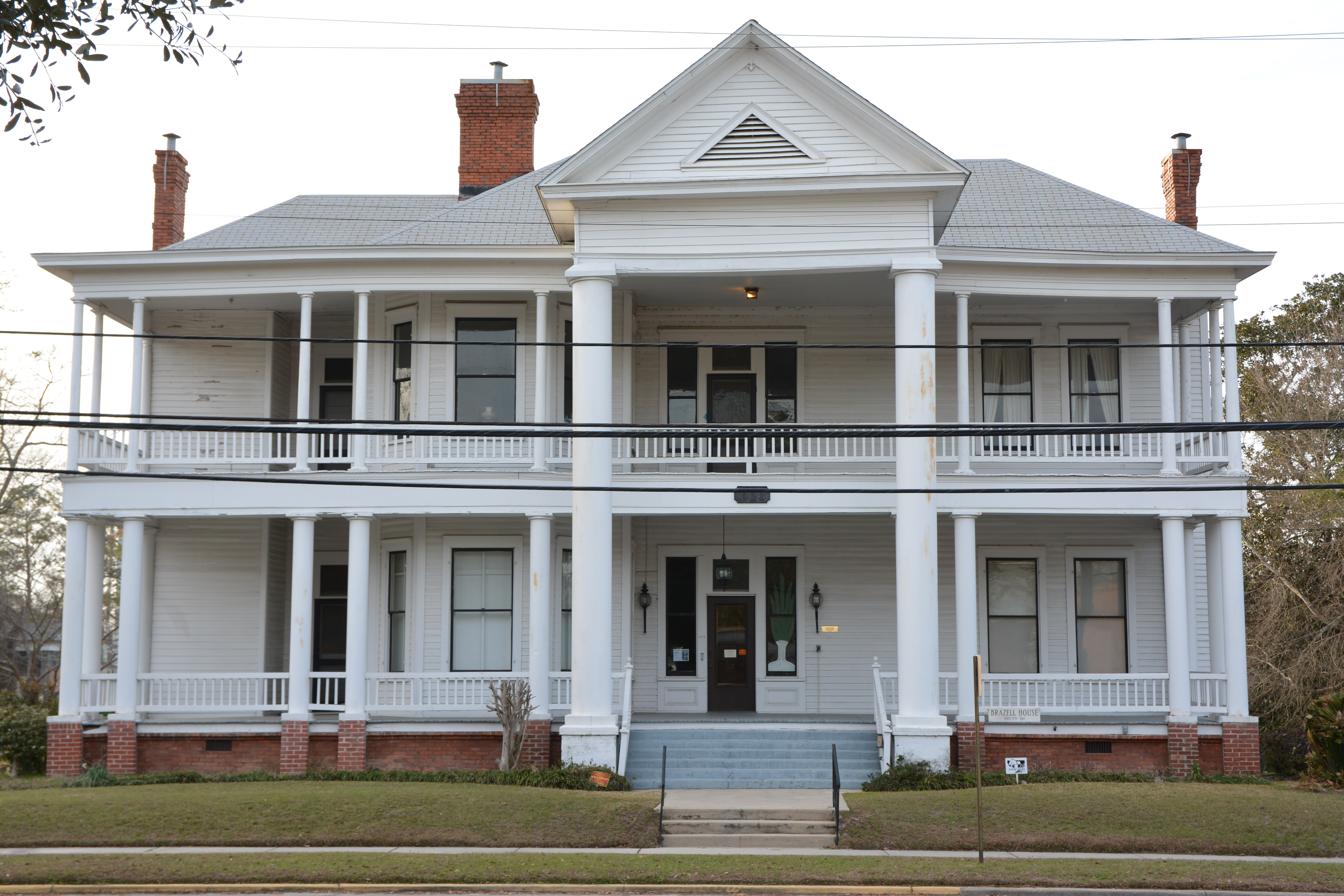
Crawford W. Brazell House, Vidalia, Georgia

Ivey P. Crutchfield (1878-1952) was an American architect and builder who worked in Georgia and Florida. Several of his works are listed on the National Register of Historic Places for their architecture.

He was born in Wilkinson County, Georgia. He was a regional architect-builder with many works in Vidalia, Georgia and with several residential works throughout Toombs County, Georgia. He learned the building trade apparently on his own and did not have formal architect training, but he felt qualified by 1916 to post signage that he was one. He died in Fort Myers, Florida in 1952.

A 1996 National Register nomination noted that "Crutchfield's buildings are easily recognizable for his use of fine Neoclassical detailing and marble, and their grand scale compared to surrounding buildings."

Works include (with attribution):

- Robert and Missouri Garbutt House, 700 W. Liberty St., Lyons, Georgia (Crutchfield, Ivey P.), NRHP-listed, known also as "Twenty Columns"
- Leader-Rosansky House, 403 Jackson St., Vidalia, Georgia (Crutchfield, Ivey P.), NRHP-listed
- Leesburg High School, 100 Starkville Ave., Leesburg, Georgia (Crutchfield, Ivey P.), NRHP-listed. He was the builder; it was designed by other architects.
- Peterson-Wilbanks House (1916), 404 Jackson St., Vidalia, Georgia (Crutchfield, Ivey P.), NRHP-listed
- Treutlen County Courthouse, Courthouse Sq., Soperton, Georgia (Crutchfield, I.P.), NRHP-listed
- Catoosa County Courthouse, 7694 Nashville St., Ringgold, Georgia (Crutchfield and Law), NRHP-listed
- Several works in Vidalia Commercial Historic District, roughly bounded by Meadows, Jackson, Pine, and Thompson Sts. Vidalia, Georgia (Crutchfield, Ivey P.), NRHP-listed, including:
  - Ladson Library, Vidalia
  - Vidalia City Hall (c.1914), the former city hall, at Church and Meadows streets in Vidalia
  - First National Bank of Vidalia (1910), a two-story Neoclassical brick building with marble cornices, pilasters, belt courses and keystones.
- Crawford W. Brazell House, Vidalia, NRHP-listed, in 1997 the Altama Museum of Art and History
- Crescent City Barber Shop, Vidalia
- New Vidalia Cafe, Vidalia
- Leader and Rosansky's Store, Vidalia, in 1997 the Estroffs Department Store
- The Vidalia Furniture Company, Vidalia (demolished)
- Meadows Buggy Company, Vidalia (demolished)
- the Vidalia College Institute annex, Vidalia (demolished).
- old Mt. Vernon Bank, in 1997 the Cash Finance Company, in Mt. Vernon
- Bank of Uvalda, in Uvalda
- Farmers and Merchants Bank, Nunez
- Soperton Bank, in 1997 the Soperton News, Soperton
