= Sharp House =

Sharp House may refer to:

in Japan

- Sharp House (Kobe), designed by Alexander Nelson Hansell, an Important Cultural Property of Japan

in the United States

(by state then city)

- M. J. Sharp House, Phoenix, Arizona, listed on the National Register of Historic Places (NRHP) in Phoenix
- Corbit-Sharp House, Odessa, Delaware, listed on the NRHP in New Castle County
- Bonner-Sharp-Gunn House, Carrollton, Georgia, listed on the NRHP in Carroll County
- Hil'ardin/Sharp-Hardin-Wright House, Forsyth, Georgia, listed on the NRHP in Monroe County
- Mathias Sharp House, Rockport, Indiana, listed on the NRHP in Spencer County
- Joseph McCoun-D.S. Sharp House, Bondville/Salvisa, Kentucky, listed on the NRHP in Mercer County
- Sharp House (Lancaster, Kentucky), listed on the National Register of Historic Places in Garrard County
- Ella Sharp House, Jackson, Michigan, listed on the NRHP in Jackson County
- John Sharp House, Stevensville, Montana, listed on the NRHP in Ravalli County
- Edward Sharp House, Camden, New Jersey, listed on the NRHP in Camden County
- Eanger Irving Couse House and Studio—Joseph Henry Sharp Studios, Taos, New Mexico, listed on the NRHP in Taos County
- Sharp Brothers House, Guilderland, New York, listed on the NRHP in Albany County
- Sharp Farmhouse, Guilderland, New York, listed on the NRHP in Albany County
- Morris Sharp House, Washington Court House, Ohio, listed on the NRHP in Fayette County
- Samuel Sharp House, Ashley, Ohio, listed on the NRHP in Delaware County
- Stephen Sharp House, Westerville, Ohio, listed on the NRHP in Delaware County
- Sharp-Page House, Columbus, Ohio, listed on the NRHP in Columbus
- Edward F. Sharp Residential Ensemble, The Dalles, Oregon, listed on the NRHP in Wasco County
- Elisha Sharp House, Ten Mile, Tennessee, listed on the NRHP in Meigs County
- Sharp House (Ennis, Texas), listed on the National Register of Historic Places in Ellis County
- John C. Sharp House, Vernon, Utah, listed on the NRHP in Tooele County
- Sharp's Oakland, Doswell, Virginia, listed on the NRHP in Hanover County
- James Sharp House, Yakima, Washington, listed on the NRHP in Yakima County

== See also ==
- Sharpe House (disambiguation)
