= Catoosa County Courthouse =

Courthouse in Georgia, US

- U.S. National Register of Historic Places
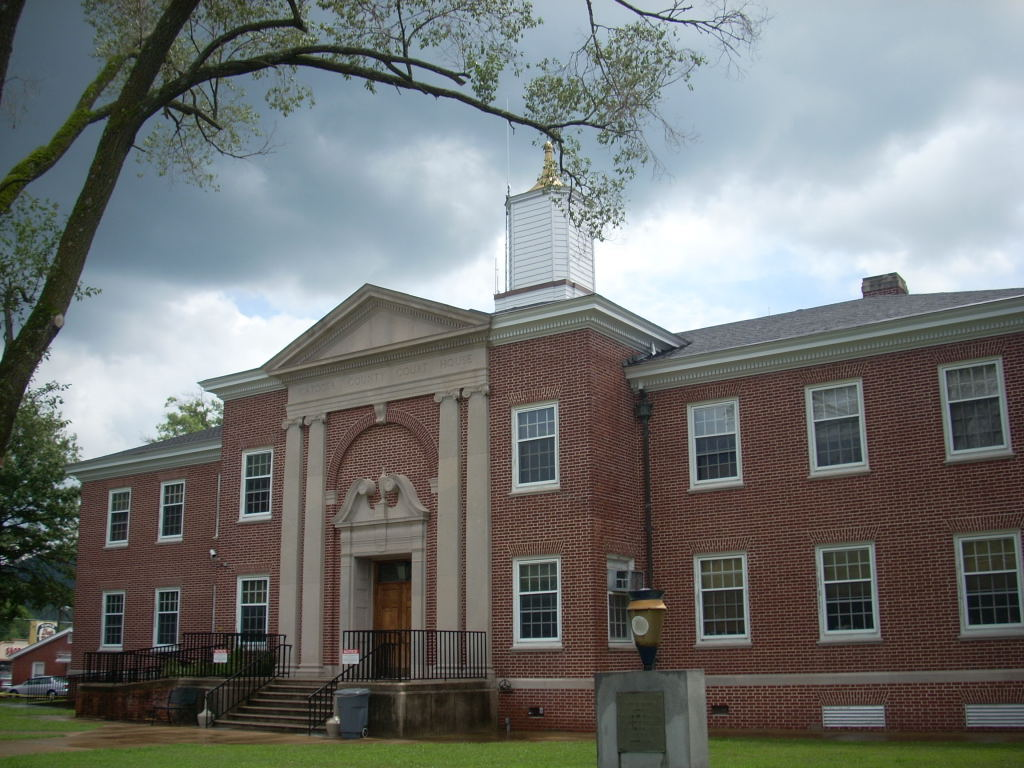

- Location within Georgia
- Location: 7694 Nashville St., Ringgold, Georgia
- Coordinates: 34°54′56″N 85°06′39″W
- Area: 0.6 acres (0.24 ha)
- Built: 1939
- Built by: Barrett Construction Company
- Architect: Crutchfield and Law
- Architectural style: Colonial Revival
- MPS: Georgia County Courthouses TR
- NRHP reference No.: 06000844
- Added to NRHP: September 20, 2006

The Catoosa County Courthouse, at 7694 Nashville St. in Ringgold, Georgia, was built in 1939. It was listed on the National Register of Historic Places in 2006.

It was designed by architects Crutchfield and Law in Colonial Revival style.

It is a two-story, brick building with a pediment and cupola and a hipped roof. It has a central block with three bays and flanking symmetrical wings, each with three bays.
