= Leader-Rosansky House =

Historic house in Georgia, United States

- U.S. National Register of Historic Places
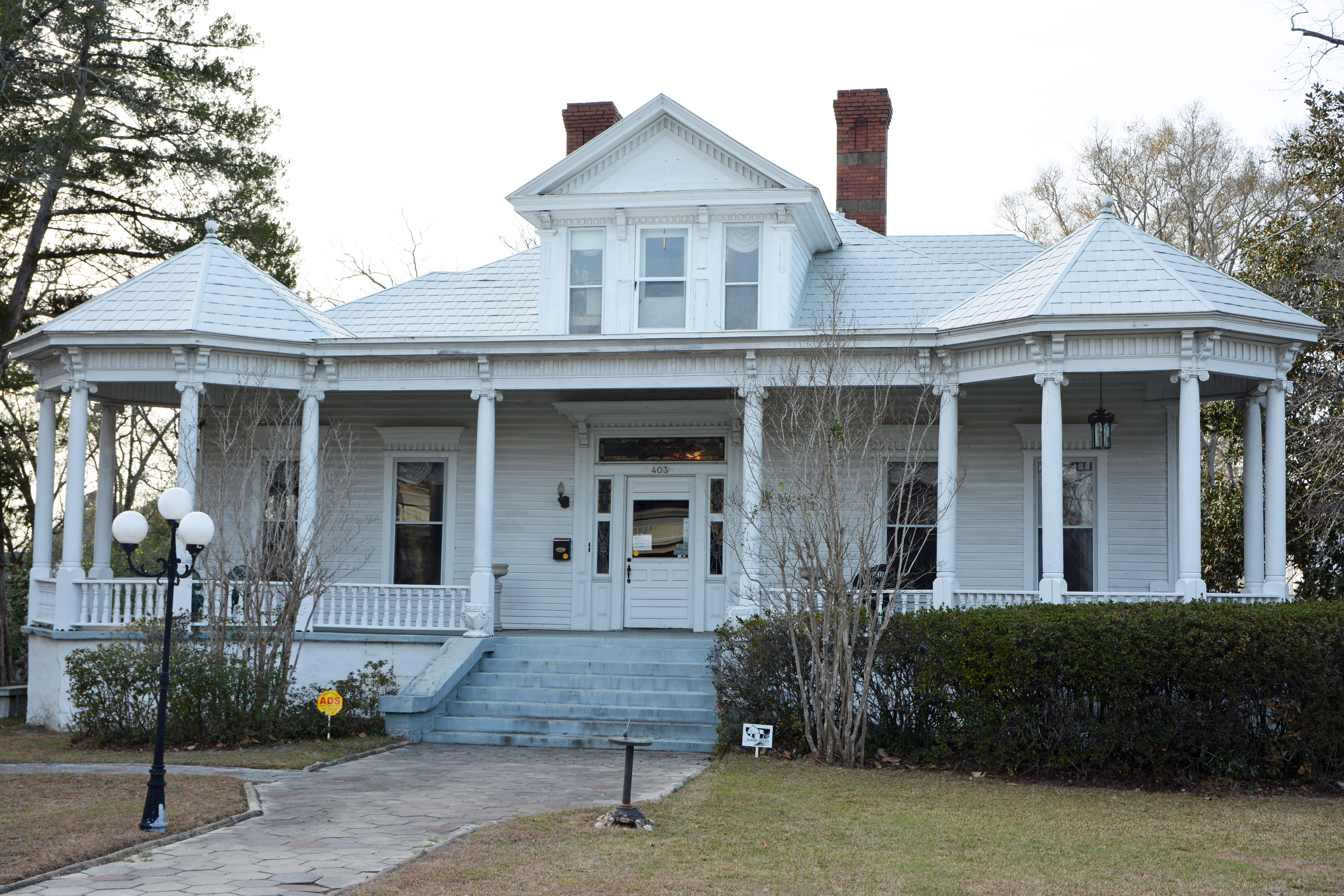

- Location within Georgia Location within the United States
- Location: 403 Jackson St., Vidalia, Georgia
- Coordinates: 32°12′52″N 82°24′50″W
- Area: less than one acre
- Built: 1903
- Architect: Ivey P. Crutchfield
- Architectural style: Queen Anne, Classical Revival
- NRHP reference No.: 95000735
- Added to NRHP: June 20, 1995

Leader-Rosansky House is a Queen Anne and Classical Revival house in Vidalia, Georgia that was built in 1903. It was listed on the National Register of Historic Places in 1995.

== Description and history ==
It is a one-and-one-half-story, frame house. It has weatherboard siding and a hipped pressed metal roof. It is believed to have been designed by regional architect-builder Ivey P. Crutchfield (1878-1952), based on its Georgian central hallway plan, its non-rectangular rooms, and elaborate detailing similar to his known works.

Almost directly across the street is the Peterson-Wilbanks House and nearby is the Crawford W. Brazell House, both designed by Ivey P. Crutchfield and listed on the NRHP.
