= Citizens Savings and Loan Association =

Citizens Savings and Loan Association may refer to:

- Citizens Savings and Loan Association (California), California S&L which became a subsidiary of National Steel Corporation
- Citizens Savings and Loan Association (Ohio), Cleveland S&L which became Citizens Savings and Trust Company

== See also ==
- Citizens Bank (disambiguation)
