= Citizens National Bank building (Martinsburg, West Virginia) =

- Citizens National Bank
- U.S. National Register of Historic Places
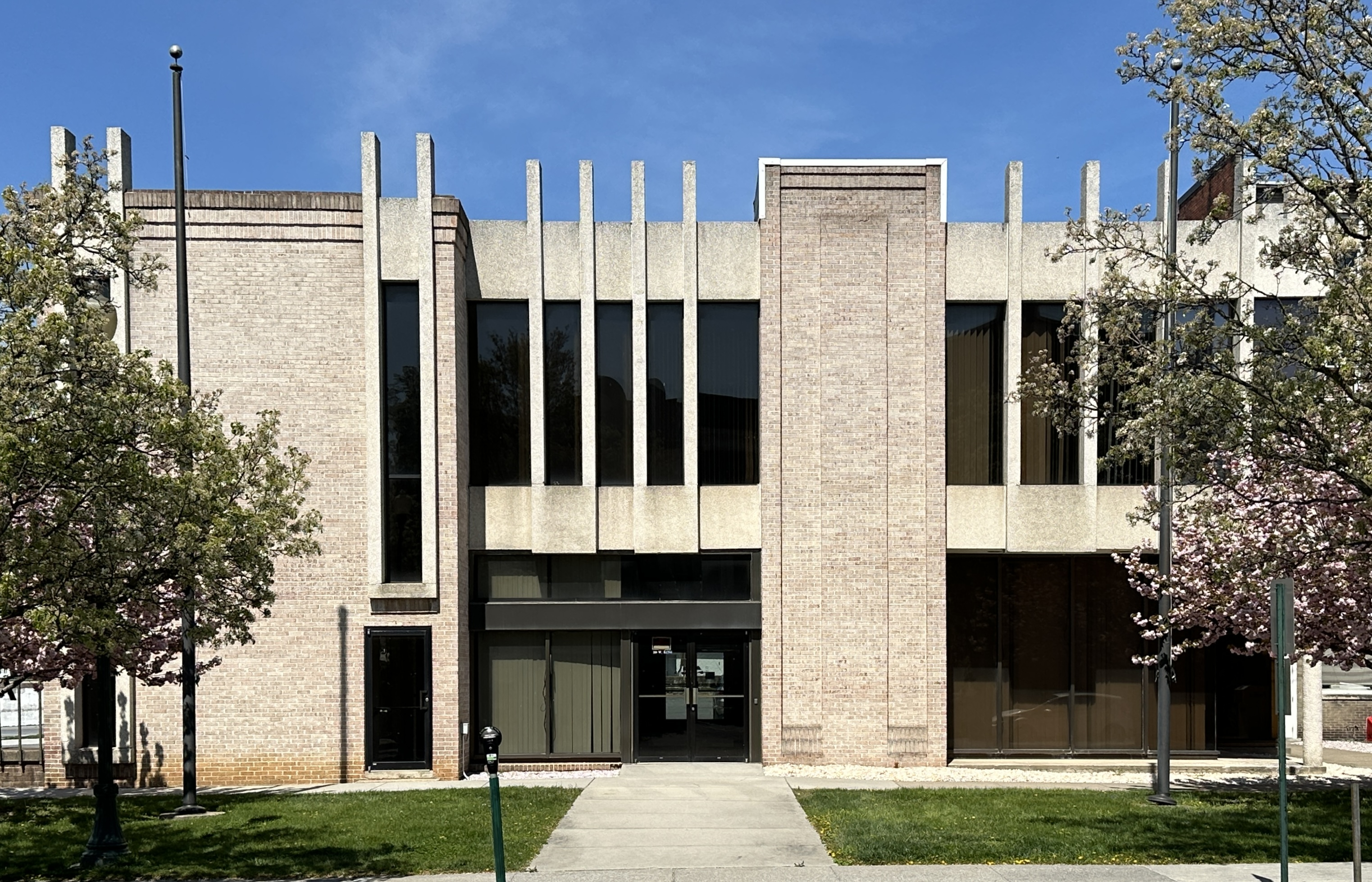
- The former Citizens National Bank in 2026

- Location within West Virginia Location within the United States
- Location: 110 West King St., Martinsburg, West Virginia
- Coordinates: 39°27′23″N 77°57′52″W
- Built: 1970
- Architect: Willard F. Wurzburg, Jr.
- Architectural style: Brutalist/Modern
- NRHP reference No.: 100009139
- Added to NRHP: August 29, 2023

The Citizens National Bank building in Martinsburg, West Virginia, United States, is a former bank building, built in 1970, that was touted as "a new beginning for future development of downtown Martinsburg." The modernist style, with references to Brutalism that was then a design trend, set it apart from surrounding development in a conscious break from local tradition.

== History ==
The Citizens National Bank building replaced the Hotel Berkeley on the site. The hotel closed in 1968 and was demolished to clear the site for the bank building. The new building, designed by Martinsburg architect Willard F. Wurzburg, Jr. (1931-1985), opened in 1970, costing $500,000 to build. During construction, $85,000 was stolen from a bank vault being stored on the site. The bank was extensively promoted for its modern features.

With consolidation, Citizens National Bank lost its individual identity as it was merged into a series of larger bank holdings. The branch was closed in 1994. The same year, Berkeley County acquired the property, which adjoins the county courthouse, for courthouse services and operations.

== Description ==
The three-story 16,000-square-foot (1,500 m^{2}) bank building uses plain masses and raw-finished materials in a mixture of modernist motifs and Brutalist applications. Since the site slopes to the rear, the elevation on King Street is two stories. Most of the exterior is a buff-colored brick. The entrances are inset from the planes of the exterior. Glazing is more extensive on the topmost floor, with tall glazing set apart by vertical concrete fins on all four sides. Some of the projecting elements are supported by brick corbels. The vertical windows extend farther down at the stairwells.

The interior has been modified since the vacation by the bank. It originally had 13 teller stations and a drive-through. Vault and utility space was located on the ground floor, while the banking lobby was on the second level fronting King Street. Offices occupied the third floor. All of these spaces have been altered to the requirements of the courthouse and County. Ceilings in the former are largely unaltered. The original design cycled ventilation returns past the light fixtures in the ceiling to capture the warm air and reuse it in colder months.

The building was placed on the National Register of Historic Places on August 19, 2023.
