= Citizens State Bank of Gillett =

- U.S. National Register of Historic Places
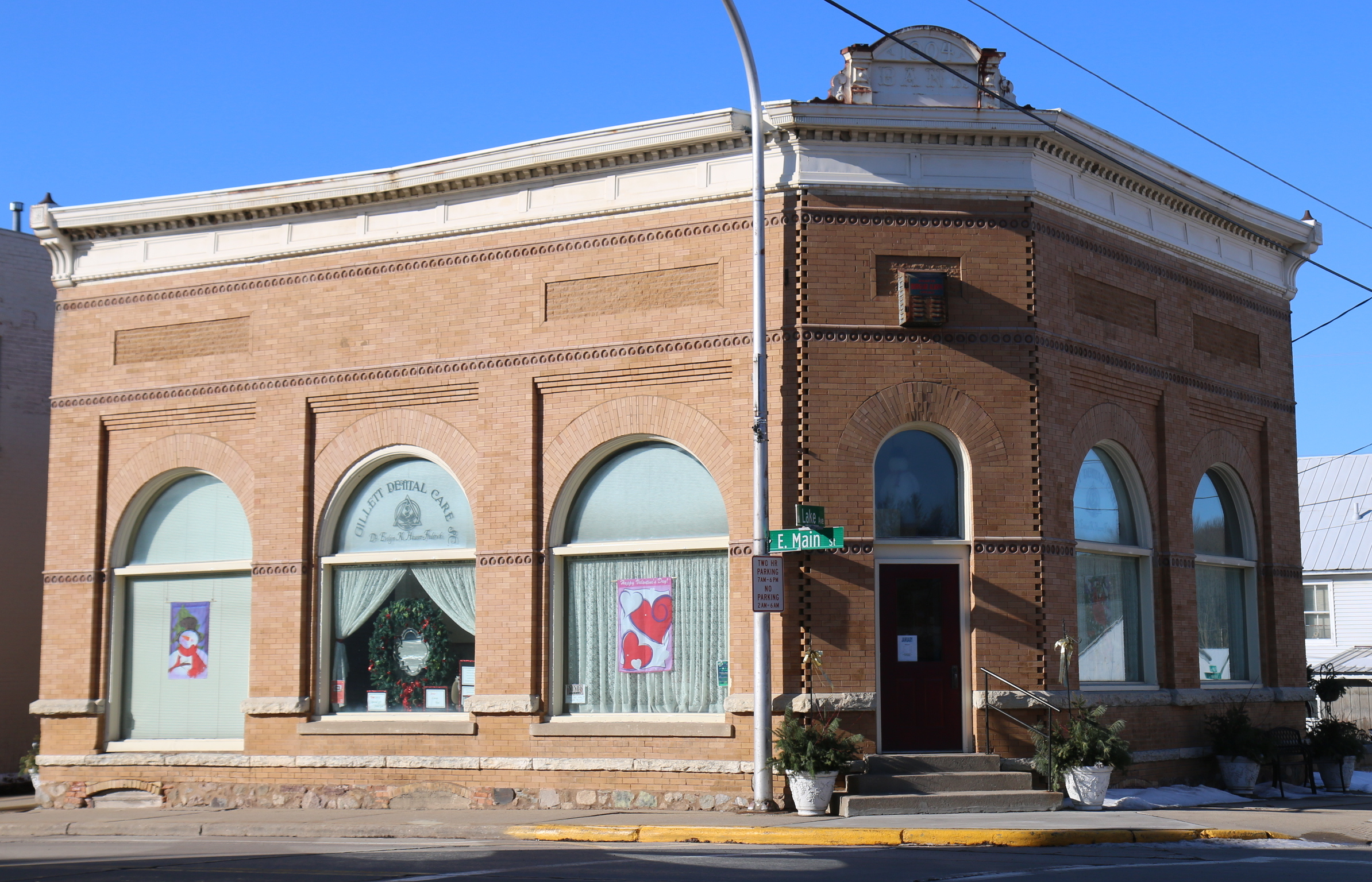
- Location: 137 E. Main St. Gillett, Wisconsin
- Coordinates: 44.89063°N 88.30519°W
- Built: 1904
- NRHP reference No.: 08001159
- Added to NRHP: December 4, 2008

The Citizens State Bank of Gillett is located in Gillett, Wisconsin. It was added to the National Register of Historic Places in 2008.

== History ==
The bank was the first building in its community constructed solely for financial purposes. A victim of the Great Depression, the bank closed in 1932. The building now houses a dental practice.
