= Citizens Bank of Amarillo =

Community banks in Texas and New Mexico

Citizens Bank
- Company type: Community Bank
- Industry: Banking
- Founded: 1904; 121 years ago in Claude, Texas, United States
- Headquarters: Amarillo, Texas, United States
- Area served: Texas
- Products: Retail banking
- Owner: Triple J Financial, Inc.
- Website: www.gocitizensbank.com

Citizens Bank of Amarillo is an independently owned network of community banks located in the Texas Panhandle and Eastern New Mexico in the United States. This is a geography that is home to approximately 500,000 residents. The bank is owned by Triple J Financial, Inc., a Texas one-bank holding company. It is Federal Deposit Insurance Corporation insured, and is a member of the Independent Community Bankers of America (ICBA).

== History ==
The bank originated in Claude in February 1904 under the name of First National Bank of Claude. The bank continues to operate in its original location. The company's eventual namesake, Citizens Bank, was established in March 1948 in Tucumcari. The Tulia location was established in June 1997. In 2004 the banks merged as a subsidiary of Triple J Financial, Inc. In November 2010 the company opened its fourth location in Amarillo.

== Services ==
Citizens bank offers a variety of deposit accounts, and debit and credit cards, and online banking services. Loan products include agricultural loans, business loans, mortgage loans, and consumer loans. The bank's area of specialization is its agricultural loans.

== Locations ==
Citizens Bank has locations in Amarillo, Texas; Claude, Texas; Tucumcari, New Mexico; and Tulia, Texas.

== Leadership ==
- President/CEO: Jeff A. Nunn

=== Board of directors ===
- Jeff A. Nunn, Chairman
- Sam Nunn, President/CFO
- John K. Ballard, Farming and Ranching
- Rex Bostwick
- Cooper Glover
- Lance Purcell
- Marcus Scarborough
- Steve Sherrill
- Julie Heddlesten Board Secretary
- Jannis Laird Assistant Board Secretary/Secretary to the holding company
