= Jim Smith House =

Historic house in Georgia, United States

- U.S. National Register of Historic Places
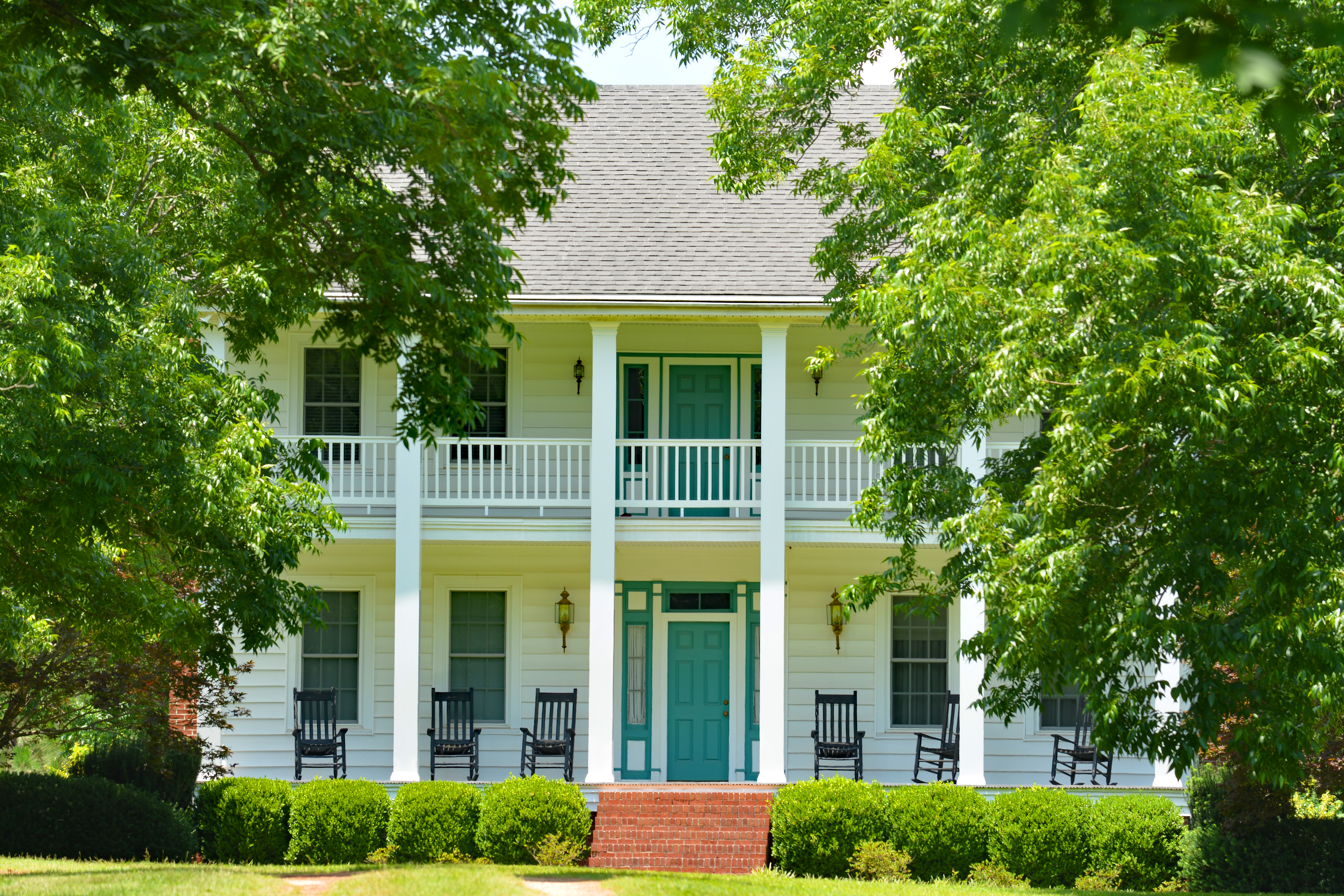

- Location within Georgia Location within the United States
- Location: Rt. 3/Toombs County Rd. 18
- Nearest city: Lyons, Georgia
- Coordinates: 32°1′3″N 82°15′9″W
- Area: 4 acres (1.6 ha)
- Built: c.1860
- Architectural style: Greek Revival, Vernacular Greek Revival
- NRHP reference No.: 89001213
- Added to NRHP: August 31, 1989

The Jim Smith House near Lyons, Georgia is a two-story wood-framed house with vernacular Greek Revival style that was built c.1860. It was home of successful farmer James Henry (Jim) Smith (1828–1899) who owned up to 4,100 acres (1,700 ha) plus a sawmill and a gristmill. The house has a two-story full-length porch supported by six square wooden columns.

In 1984 the house was moved about 1.5 miles (2.4 km) from its original location to avoid demolition. The new location was historically owned by Smith and is similar to the original location. It was then renovated and a rear wing was added.

The house was listed on the National Register of Historic Places in 1989.
