= Citizens Bank of Northern California =

Defunct American Bank

- Company type: Public
- Traded as: Expert Market: CZNB
- Industry: Banking
- Founded: February 8, 1995
- Defunct: September 23, 2011
- Headquarters: Nevada City, California, United States
- Number of locations: 7 branches (2010)
- Key people: Gary D. Gall, President/CEO; Kenneth E. Baker, Chairman
- Products: Checking; Savings; Commercial loans; Consumer loans; Online banking
- Total assets: $326.9M USD

Citizens Bank of Northern California, locally known as Citizens Bank, was a community bank headquartered in Nevada City, California, that operated from 1995 to 2011.

== History ==
Originally named Citizens Bank of Nevada County, the bank opened for business on February 8, 1995.

The bank served Nevada and Placer counties with seven full-service branches located in: Nevada City, Grass Valley, Penn Valley, Lake of the Pines, Truckee, and Auburn. It offered consumer loans and other traditional banking products and services, designed to meet the needs of small and middle market businesses and individuals.

In June 2003, it became a wholly owned subsidiary of Citizens Bancorp. In preparation of opening its first branch outside of Nevada County, the bank changed its name to Citizens Bank of Northern California in April 2006.

The bank ceased operations on September 23, 2011, as ordered by the Federal Deposit Insurance Corporation (FDIC). Customer accounts were transferred to Tri Counties Bank of Chico, California.
