= Vidalia Commercial Historic District =

Historic district in Georgia, United States

- U.S. National Register of Historic Places
- U.S. Historic district
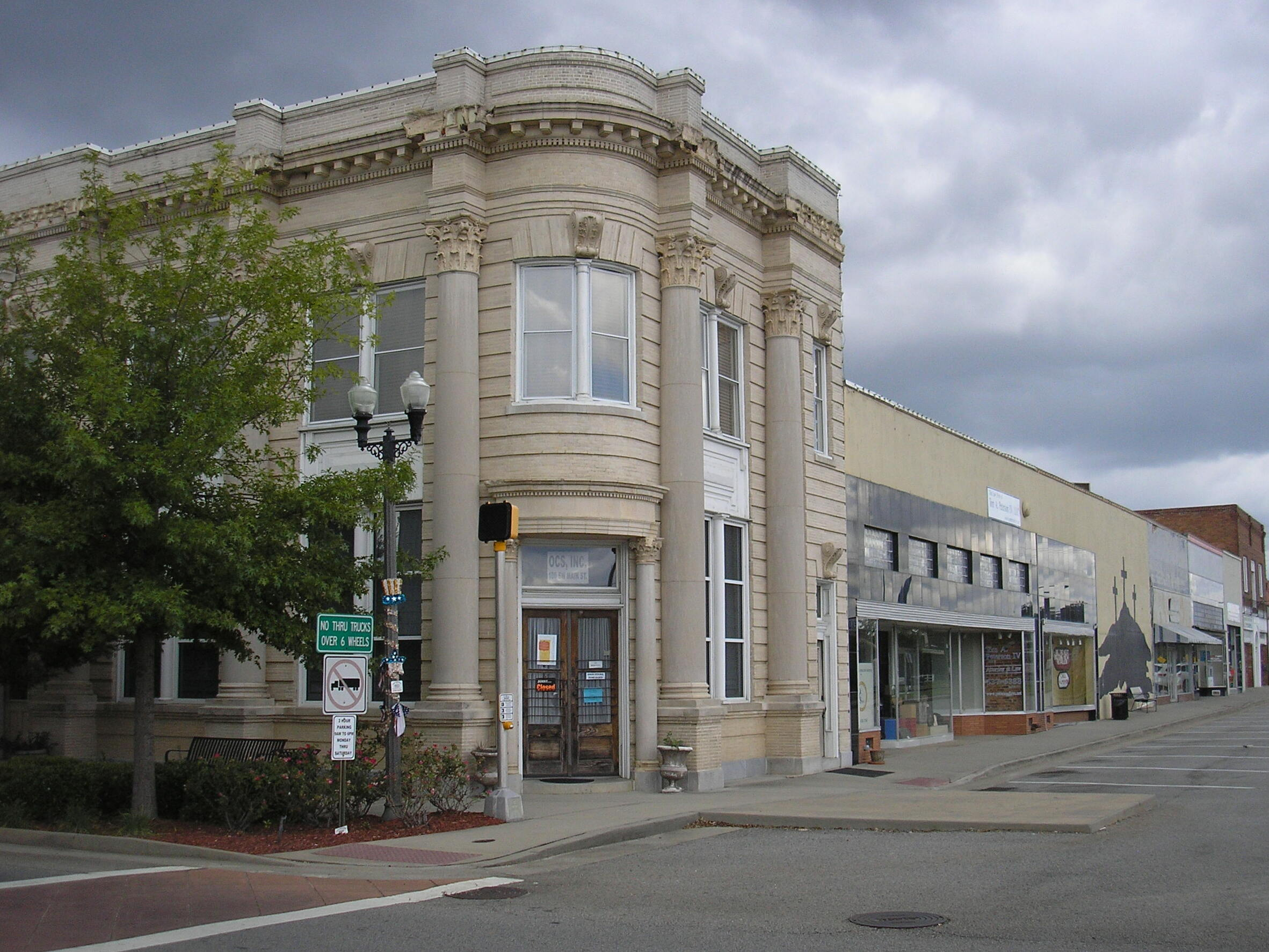

- Location within Georgia
- Location: Roughly bounded by Meadow, Jackson, Pine, and Thompson Sts., Vidalia, Georgia
- Area: 15 acres (6.1 ha)
- Built: 1900
- Architect: Crutchfield, Ivey P.; Celentano, Daniel, et al.
- Architectural style: Early Commercial, Colonial Revival, Classical Revival
- NRHP reference No.: 96001020
- Added to NRHP: September 27, 1996

The Vidalia Commercial Historic District, also known as Downtown Vidalia, is a 15-acre (6.1 ha) historic district in Vidalia, in Toombs County, Georgia, that is listed on the National Register of Historic Places. It included 69 contributing buildings when listed in 1996.

The district also contains 22 non-contributing buildings.

The district includes the Citizens Bank of Vidalia, which is separately listed on the National Register.

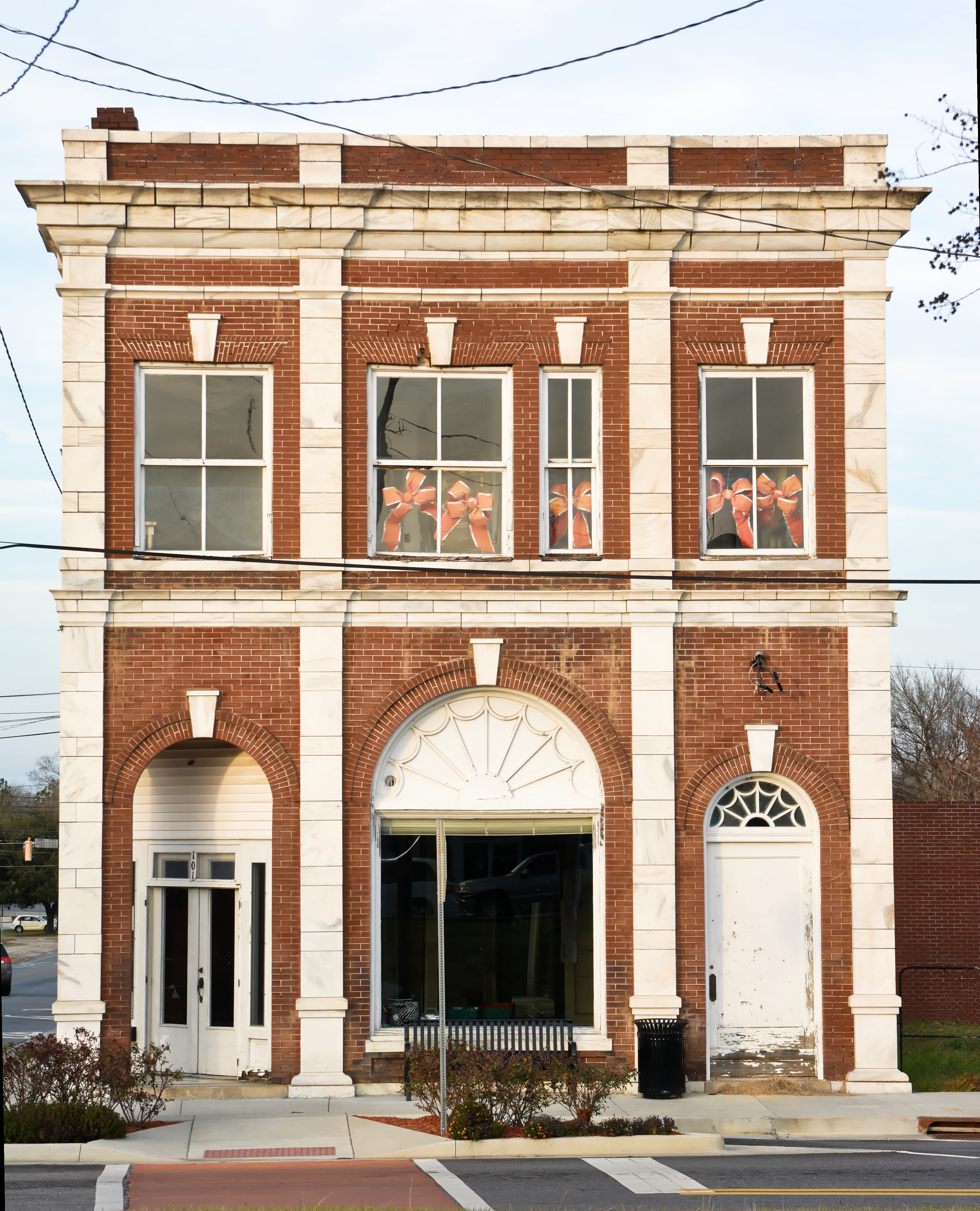
First National Bank building at Main & McIntosh streets

Also included, at the corner of McIntosh and Main streets, is the First National Bank of Vidalia, which was designed by architect Ivey P. Crutchfield. It was built in 1910 by W.D. Donovan who served as its first president. The bank was started with a capital stock of $35,000. It is a two-story Neoclassical brick building with marble cornices, pilasters, belt courses and keystones. The building was purchased in c. 1926 by J. Frank Darby after the First National Bank had moved. Darby founded the Darby Bank there, which was the only bank surviving in Toombs County at some point during the Great Depression; Darby later moved his bank to a building at the corner of Church and Meadows streets, and the First National Bank building was occupied by Lillar's Wave Shop in 1997.

Crutchfield is believed to have designed the former Vidalia City Hall, which in 1996 was occupied by the Ladson Genealogical Library, built c.1914 at southwest corner of Church and Meadows Streets.

Crutchfield also designed the Ladson Library and the Bank of Vidalia, which in 1997 had been much altered and was occupied by Phillips Pharmacy.
