= Citizens Bank Financial Center =

Building in Wilkes-Barre, Pennsylvania, United States

Citizens Bank Financial Center is an architectural landmark in downtown Wilkes-Barre, Pennsylvania, United States. It was designed by the architect D.H. Burnham and completed in 1911. An illuminated sign has sat atop the building since 1912.

== Description ==
=== Building architecture ===
The building is 13 stories high (the top story was added in 1926) and rises to a height of 170 feet (52 m). It was built as the headquarters for the Miner's National Bank, and over the years has had a number of owners, including the United Penn Bank and Mellon Bank. The building features a recess, giving it an "H" shape. Atop the second floor, a sculpture of a nesting eagle and a flag pole can be seen from the Franklin Street side of the building. A frieze at the top of the building is decorated with lion heads and a number of interesting embellishments can be seen climbing the façade.

=== Signage ===
In 1912, an illuminated sign was placed atop the building by the Miners National Bank. The building's subsequent owners have allowed the sign to remain, and as of 2018, the green Citizens Bank sign sits at more than 200 feet (61 m) above street level. In 2013, Citizens Bank moved from the building after more than a decade, and while the building now houses offices and apartments, the Citizens Bank sign remains.
