= Citizens State Bank of Henry =

- U.S. National Register of Historic Places
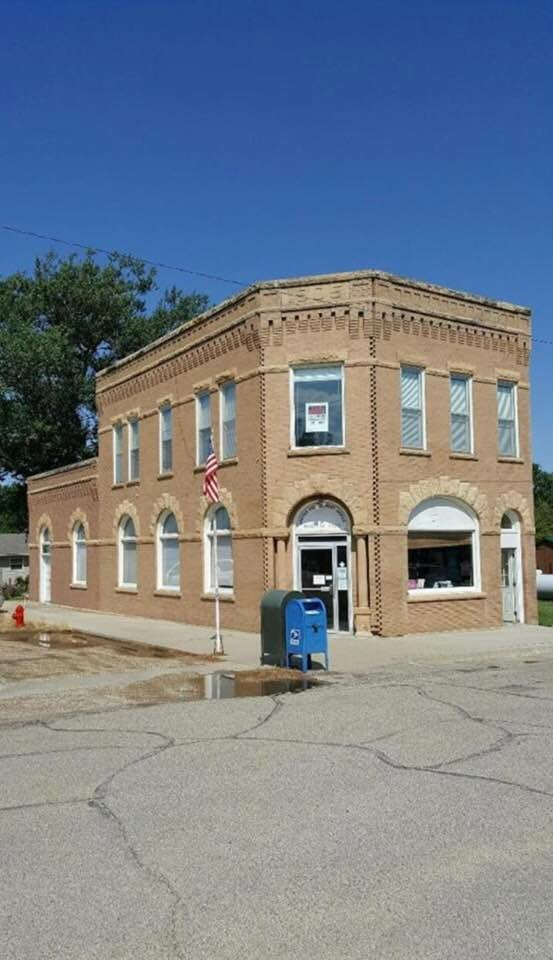

- Location within South Dakota Location within the United States
- Location: Junction of Main and 2nd Sts., Henry, South Dakota
- Coordinates: 44°52′41″N 97°28′06″W
- Area: less than one acre
- Built: 1905, c.1920
- Architectural style: Early Commercial
- NRHP reference No.: 97001391
- Added to NRHP: November 7, 1997

The Citizens State Bank of Henry, located at Main and 2nd Streets in Henry, South Dakota, was built in 1905. It is Early Commercial in style. It was listed on the National Register of Historic Places in 1997.

It housed the Citizens State bank until 1926, and later housed the United States Post Office.

It is a two-story brick building with sandstone trim, and a flat roof with a parapet. It has a one-story addition on its west side, added in c.1920.
