= Robert and Missouri Garbutt House =

Historic house in Georgia, United States

- U.S. National Register of Historic Places
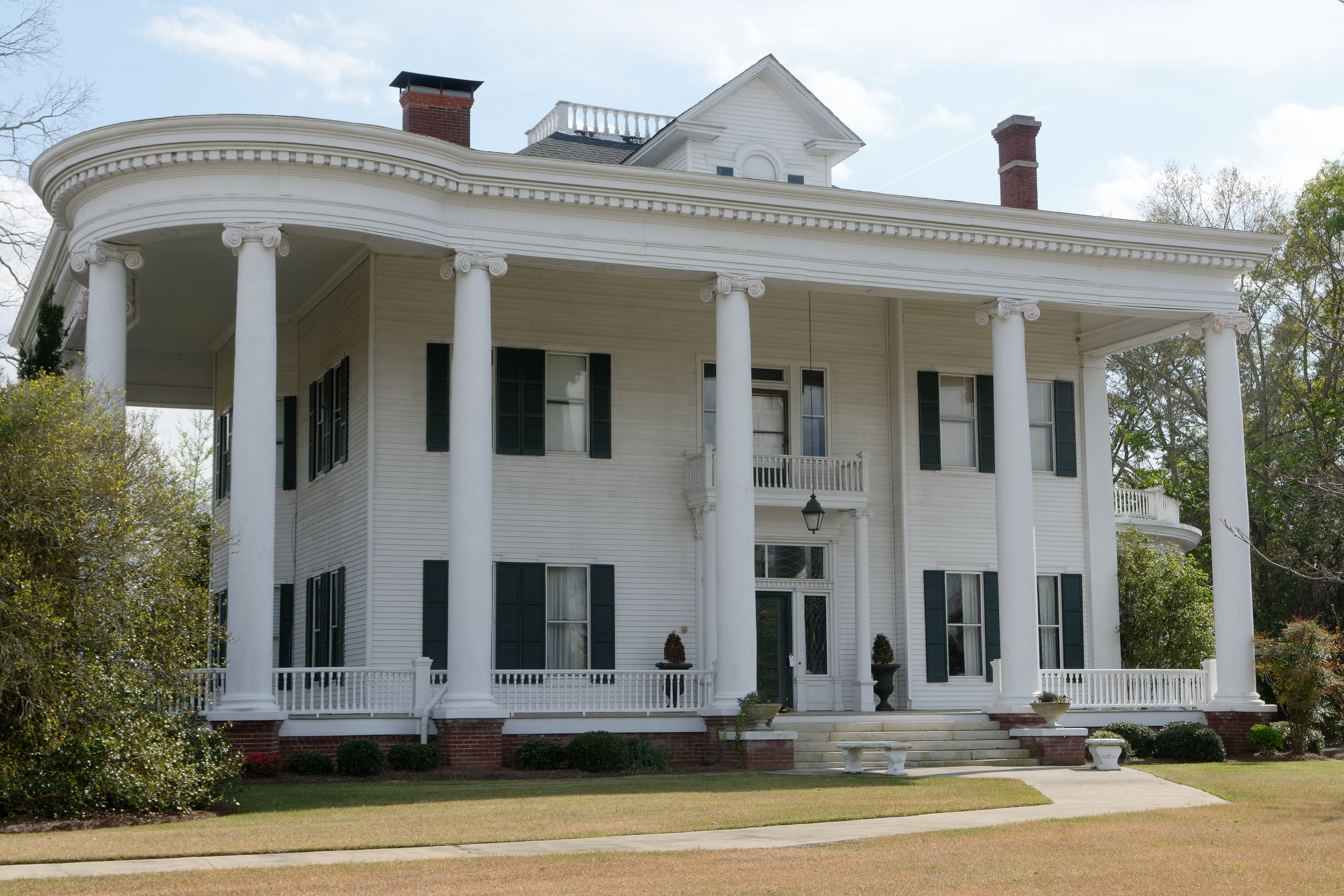
- The house in 2018

- Location within Georgia
- Location: 700 W. Liberty St., (corner with Bulldog Rd.) Lyons, Georgia
- Coordinates: 32.20123°N 82.32997°W
- Area: 3.8 acres (1.5 ha)
- Built: 1908-10
- Architect: Ivey P. Crutchfield
- Architectural style: Classical Revival
- NRHP reference No.: 00001564
- Added to NRHP: December 28, 2000

The Robert and Missouri Garbutt House in Lyons, Georgia, also known as Twenty Columns, is a historic Classical Revival-style house built in 1908–1910. It was built by architect/builder Ivey P. Crutchfield.

It is located prominently on GA SR 30/U.S. 280, the main east–west route through Lyons.

Other contributing buildings on the property are a carriage house (c.1900) and a servant's house (c.1920).
