= Citizens Banking Company =

Historic bank in the US state of Georgia

- U.S. National Register of Historic Places
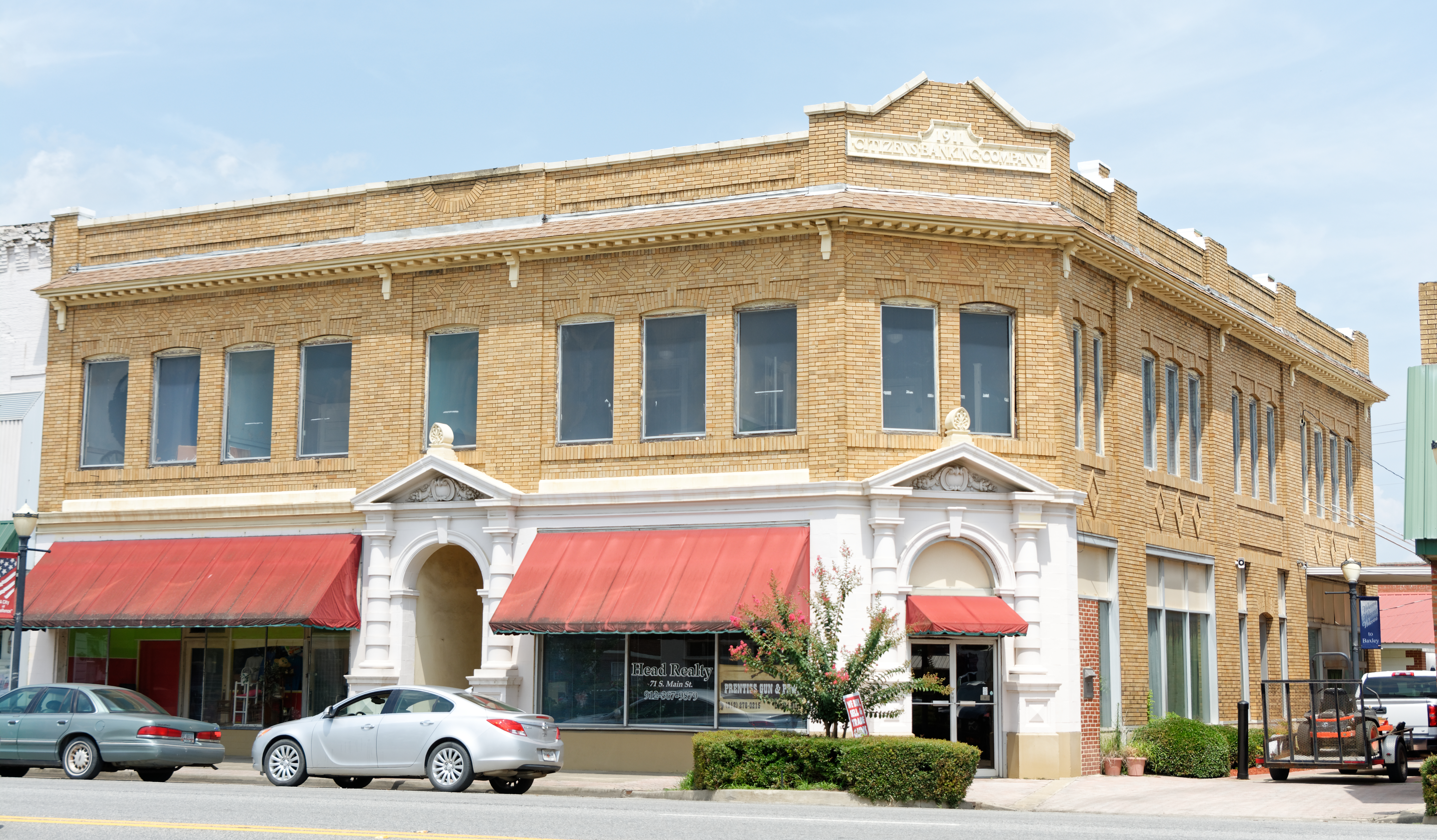

- Location within Georgia Location within the United States
- Location: 112-116 N. Main St., Baxley, Georgia
- Coordinates: 31°46′38″N 82°20′55″W
- Area: less than one acre
- Built: 1912
- NRHP reference No.: 85000932
- Added to NRHP: May 2, 1985

The Citizens Banking Company, at 112-116 N. Main St. in Baxley in Appling County, Georgia, was built in 1911. It was listed on the National Register of Historic Places in 1985.

Its first floor includes a section which was originally a bank, with an oblique corner entrance, and also separate commercial space. The original bank was closed and sold at auction in 1917; two other banks subsequently used the bank space.

It was deemed "significant in architecture as a fine example of a building built to be a bank and commercial structure during the early 20th-century Neoclassical era" including that it "exemplifies the strong, secured look that bankers sought in their turn-of-the-century buildings, obviously to stress the strength of their institution" and that it "is also a good and relatively early use of poured reinforced concrete construction in a small Georgia town." It was deemed "significant in commerce as a good example of the development of a small-town pre-Depression banking and commercial institution in the early 20th century."
