= Citizens Bank (Williston, Florida) =

Historic bank building in Florida, US

- U.S. National Register of Historic Places
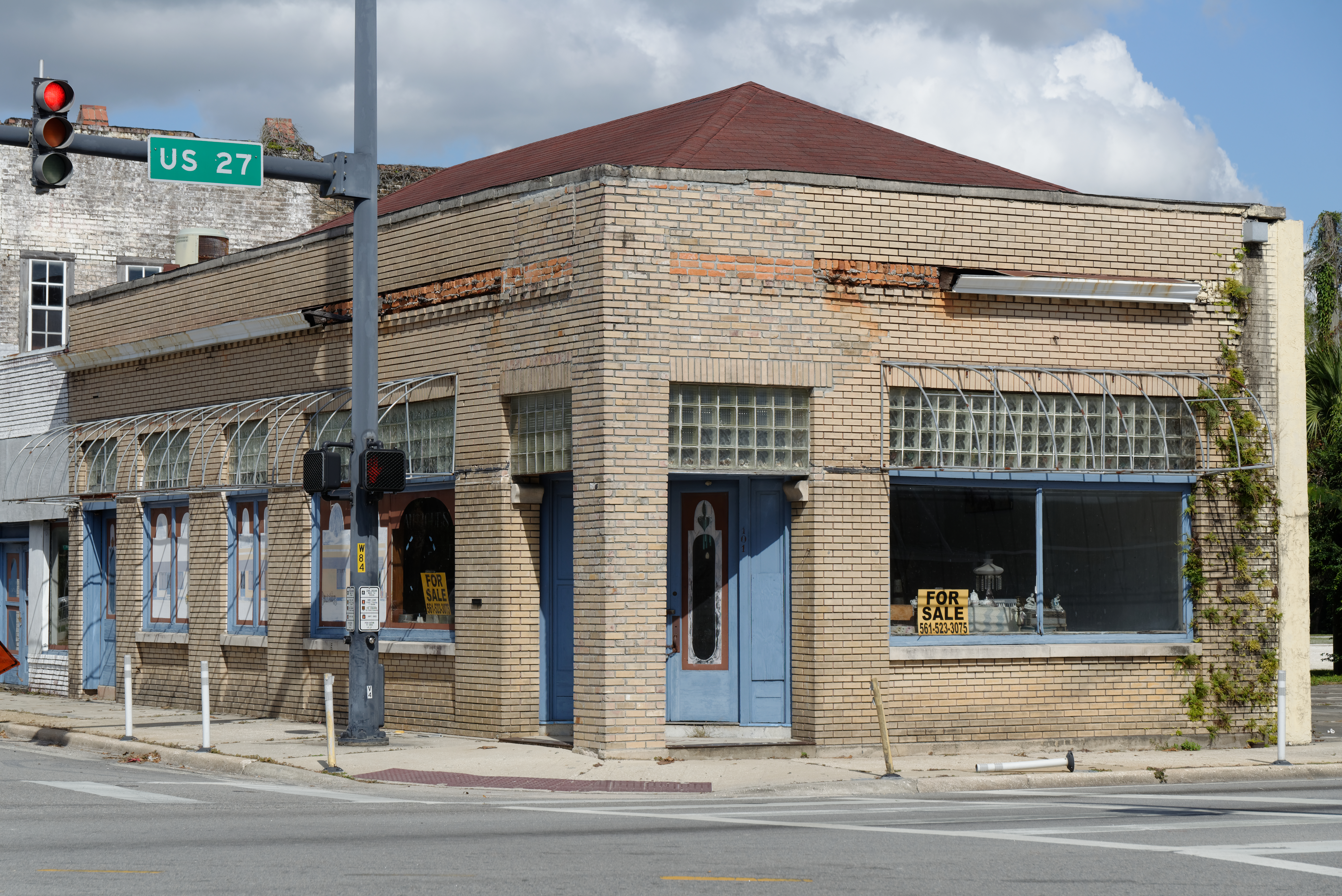

- Location within Florida Location within the United States
- Location: Williston, Florida
- Coordinates: 29.38757°N 82.44713°W
- Architectural style: Masonry Vernacular
- NRHP reference No.: 95001369
- Added to NRHP: November 29, 1995

The Citizens Bank is a historic site in Williston, Florida, located at 5 North Main Street. On November 29, 1995, it was added to the U.S. National Register of Historic Places.

The Citizens Bank opened in 1914 and closed in 1927, perhaps a victim of the 1926 collapse of the Florida Land Boom.
