= McLemore-Sharpe Farmstead =

Historic house in Georgia, United States

- U.S. National Register of Historic Places
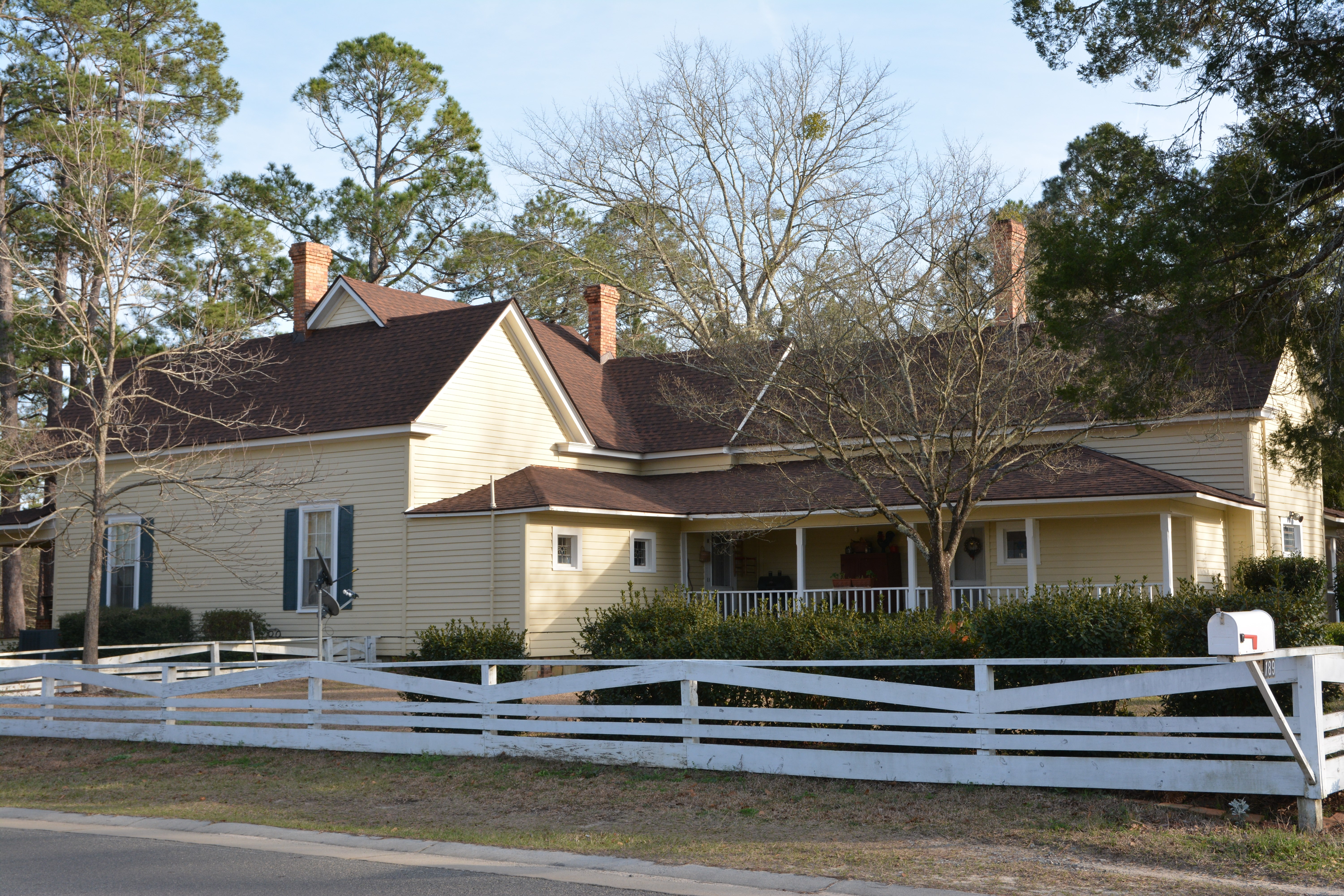
- Sharpe farmhouse

- Location within Georgia Location within the United States
- Location: SW of Vidalia, Georgia on GA 130
- Coordinates: 32.1934°N 82.4345°W
- Area: 40 acres (16 ha)
- Built: 1864
- Built by: C.B. McLemore and Charles McLemore; Bob Sharpe
- Architectural style: Single pen log structure
- NRHP reference No.: 82002487
- Added to NRHP: August 19, 1982

The McLemore-Sharpe Farmstead is a historic farm in Toombs County, Georgia, southwest of Vidalia. The farmstead includes two farmhouses and their associated outbuildings. The McLemore farmhouse is a log cabin, of single pen type, built in 1864, with a shed-type front porch and additional shed rooms. The Sharpe farmhouse is a one-story wood-frame house built in 1903. The property was listed on the National Register of Historic Places in 1982.

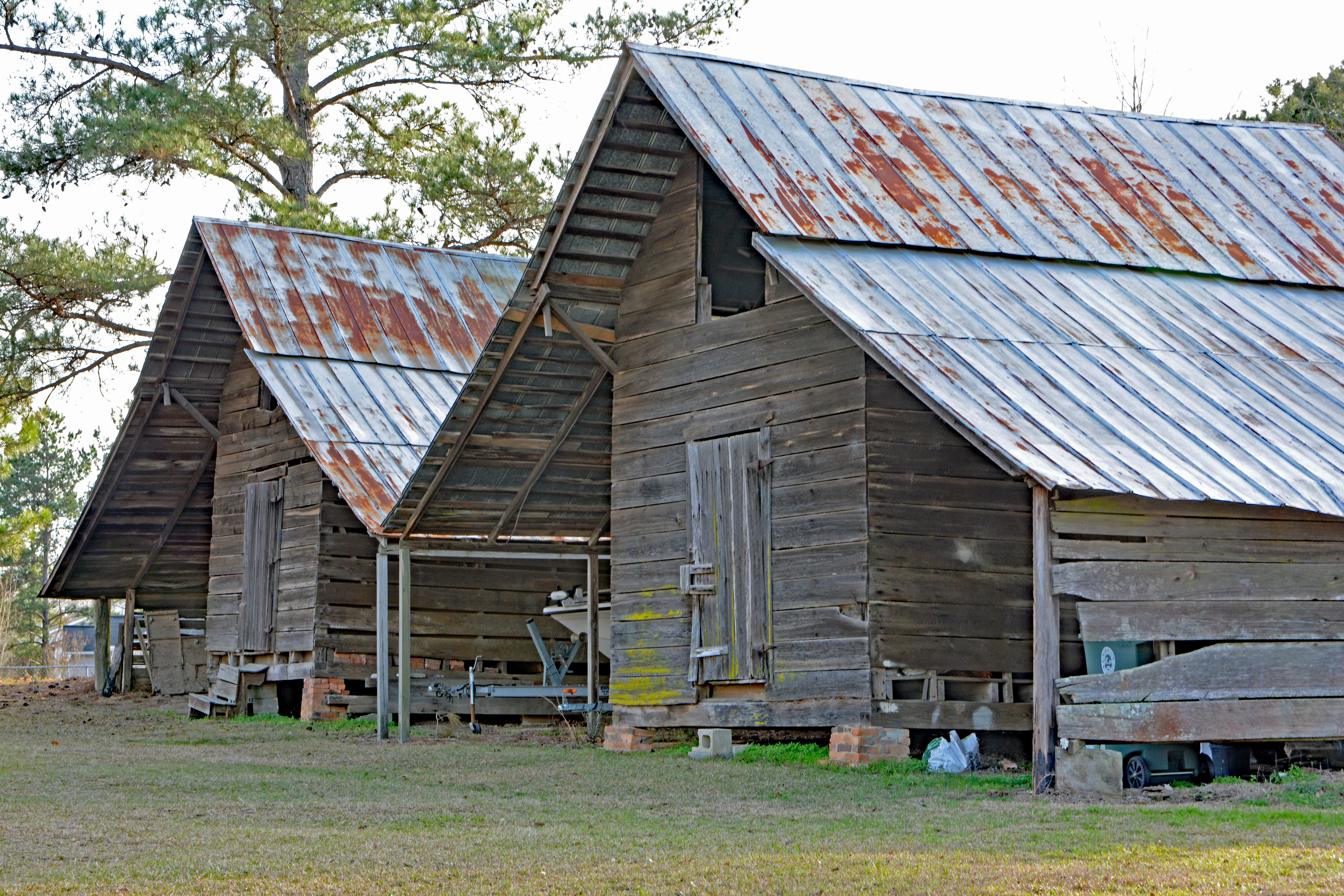

The farm includes seven contributing buildings, 11 other contributing structures, and six contributing sites (including a family cemetery, Sharpe Cemetery).

The McLemore farmhouse was built for Chesley Boswick (C.B.) McLemore, with much work done by one of his slaves who prepared logs and made the bricks for the chimney. It was estimated that the exposed beams came from trees that were 125-years-old when the house was built. It has a detached kitchen, separated by a 20-foot walkway. The house became a tenant house and later a storage house, after the new farmhouse was built in 1903. C.B.'s son-in-law Robert L. (Bob) Sharpe, built the new house, and lived there with his wife and mother-in-law (C.B.'s widow).
