= Citizens Bank (South Bend, Indiana) =

- U.S. National Register of Historic Places
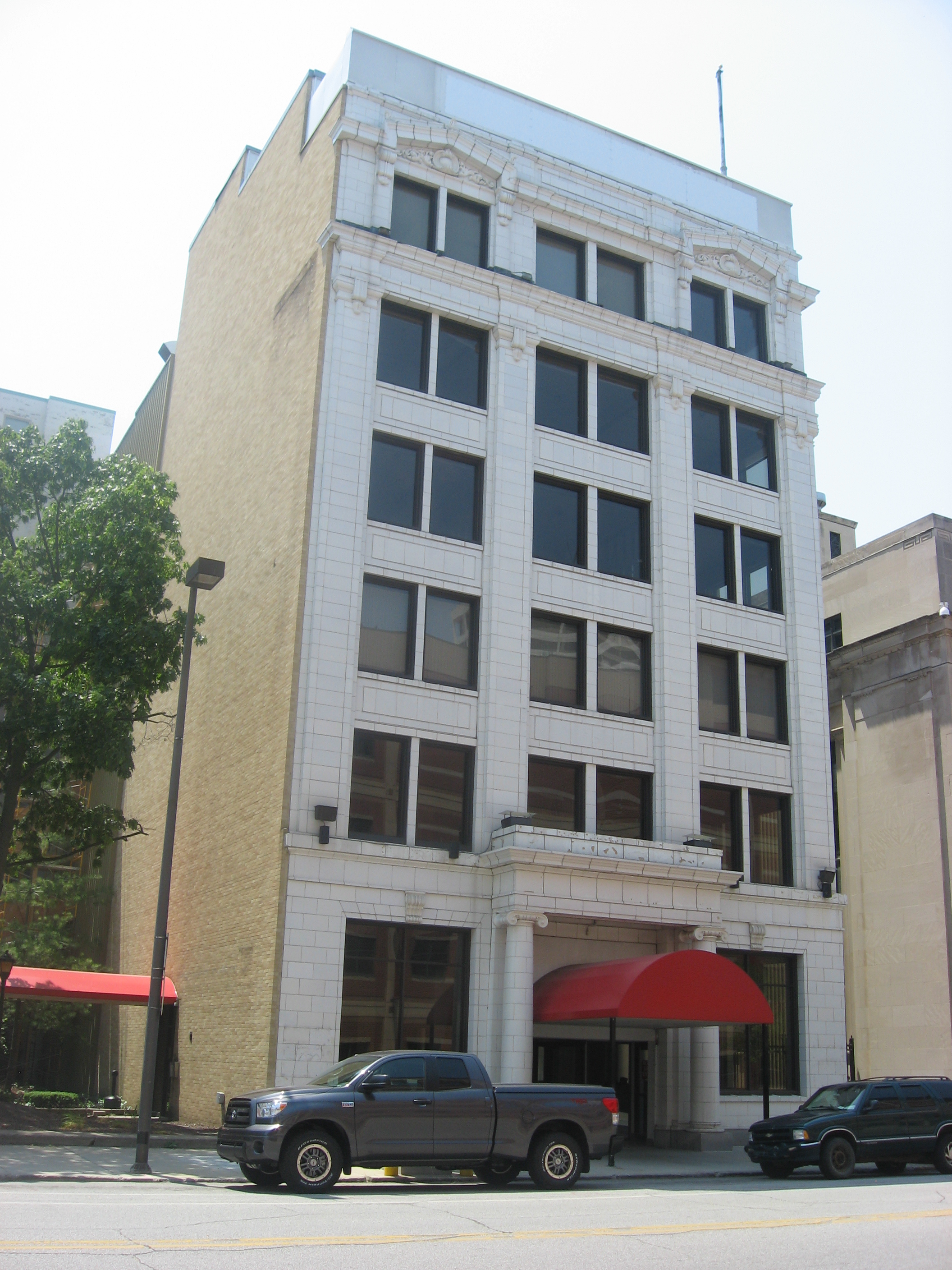
- Citizens Bank, July 2012

- Location within Indiana Location within the United States
- Location: 112 W. Jefferson, South Bend, Indiana
- Coordinates: 41°40′29″N 86°15′3″W
- Area: less than one acre
- Built: 1913
- Architect: Freyermuth & Maurer
- Architectural style: Chicago, The Commercial Style
- MPS: Downtown South Bend Historic MRA
- NRHP reference No.: 85001207
- Added to NRHP: June 5, 1985

Citizens Bank is a historic bank building located at South Bend, Indiana. It was built in 1913, and is a six-story, three-bay, Commercial style brick building with a terra cotta front facade. A rear addition was constructed in 1923. At the central entrance bay is a front portico supported by Ionic order columns.

It was listed on the National Register of Historic Places in 1985.
