= Crawford W. Brazell House =

- U.S. National Register of Historic Places
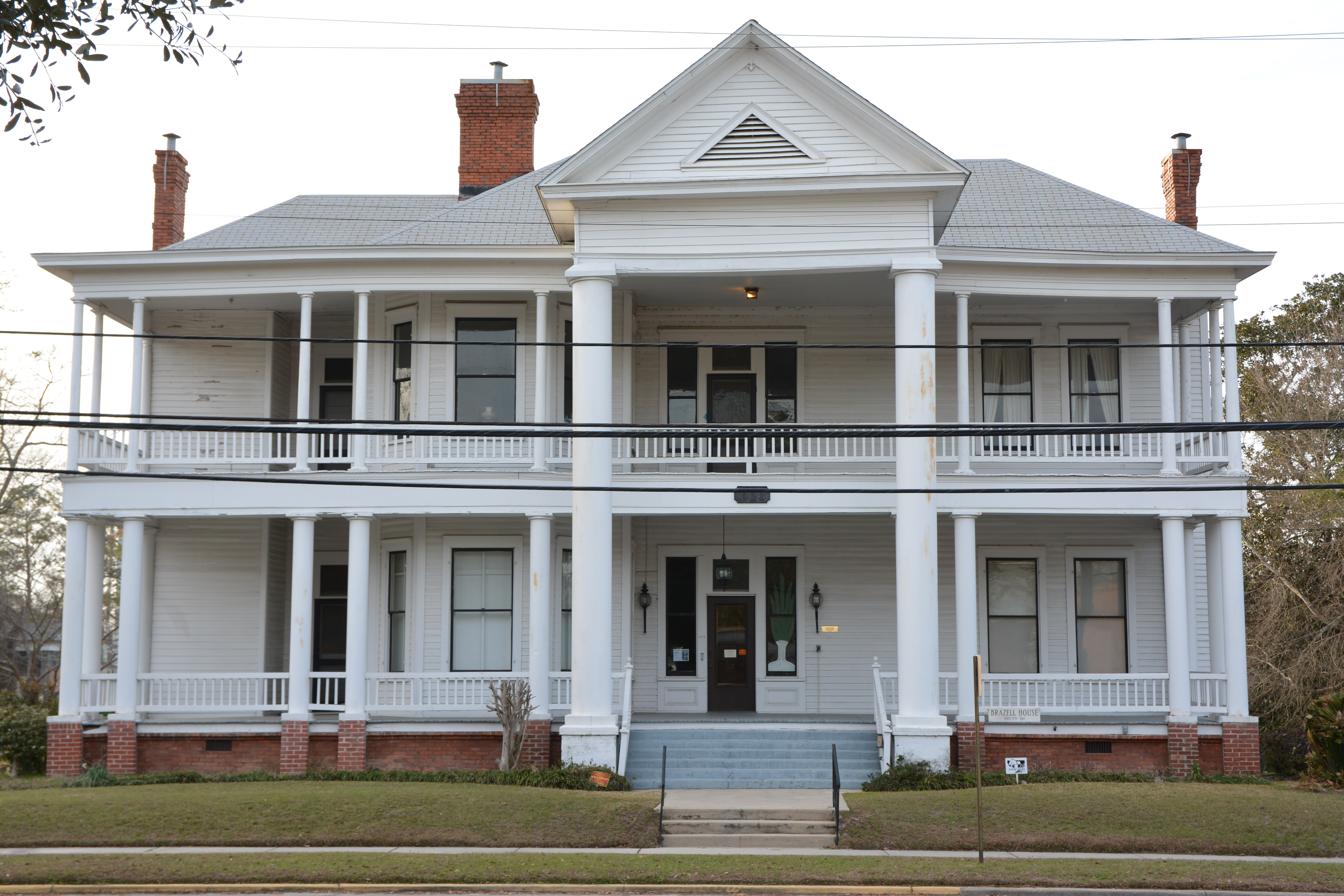
- House in 2017

- Location within Georgia Location within the United States
- Location: 607 Jackson St., Vidalia, Georgia
- Coordinates: 32°12′41″N 82°24′56″W
- Area: 0.5 acres (0.20 ha)
- Built: 1911
- Architect: Crutchfield, Ivey P.
- Architectural style: Classical Revival
- NRHP reference No.: 82002486
- Added to NRHP: June 17, 1982

The Crawford W. Brazell House in Vidalia, Georgia was built in 1911 in for the Crawford W. Brazell family by noted builder/architect Ivey P. Crutchfield. The family, Crawford W. Brazell, wife Mary Clifton Brazell, and three of their five daughters, Anna Brazell, Nora Brazell and Rusha Brazell, were the only permanent residents of the home. Listed on the National Register of Historic Places in 1982., the Neo-Classical building is marked with a multi-hipped roofline supported by 48 columns and deep double porches on the East and South sides of the house. Additional porches on the North side have since been enclosed. Five chimneys served twelve fireplaces and a cookstove. Thirty-two windows of rolled glass, six to seven feet in height, provided natural light to the interior. The home also received service from the infant electrical grid of Vidalia; original light fixtures remain in use. The layout included a parlor, sitting room, dining room, kitchen, seven bedrooms, and two three-piece baths (no longer extant). Other features included heart-pine floors, tongue-and-groove bead board ceilings, accordion-fold doors, transoms, and decorative mantels and moldings.

Since 1980, the building has housed the Altama Museum of Art and History (501c3). The permanent collection showcases an array of Contemporary Southern art, antique prints, fine furniture, and historic costume. The museum is also home to one of the largest collections of Staffordshire porcelain on public display in the United States comprising over 250 pieces representing 216 patterns and dating to the mid-1700s. Quadruped prints by John James Audubon are also included. The Shiplett Gallery of Girl Scouting preserves memorabilia and uniforms spanning more than 100 years of scouting history. The Meadows Gallery hosts temporary exhibits.

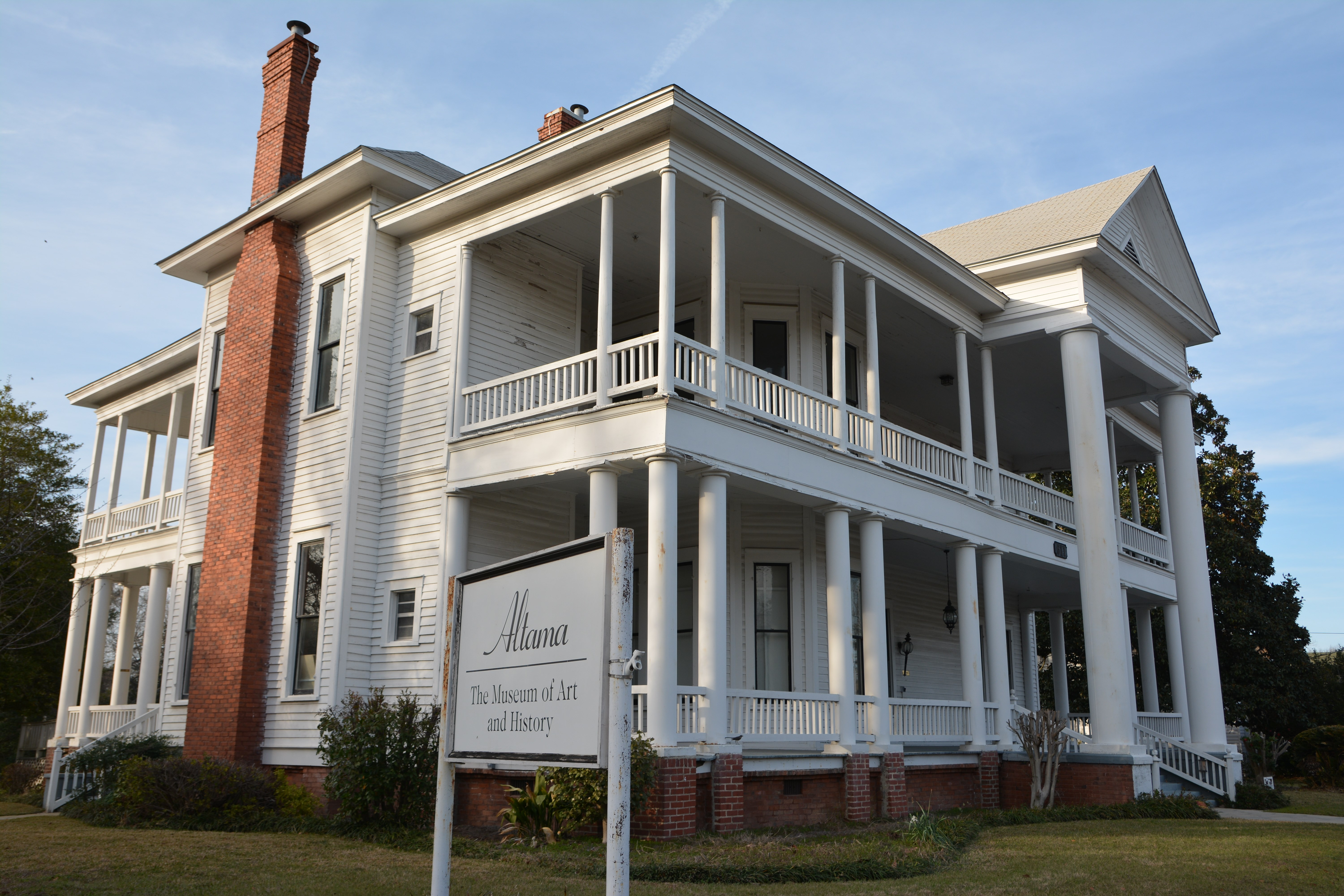
Corner view, with museum signage, in 2017

The Brazell House is one of few surviving Neo-Classical residences built in Toombs County post-Reconstruction.
