= Citizens Bank of Vidalia =

Historic bank in the US state of Georgia

- U.S. National Register of Historic Places
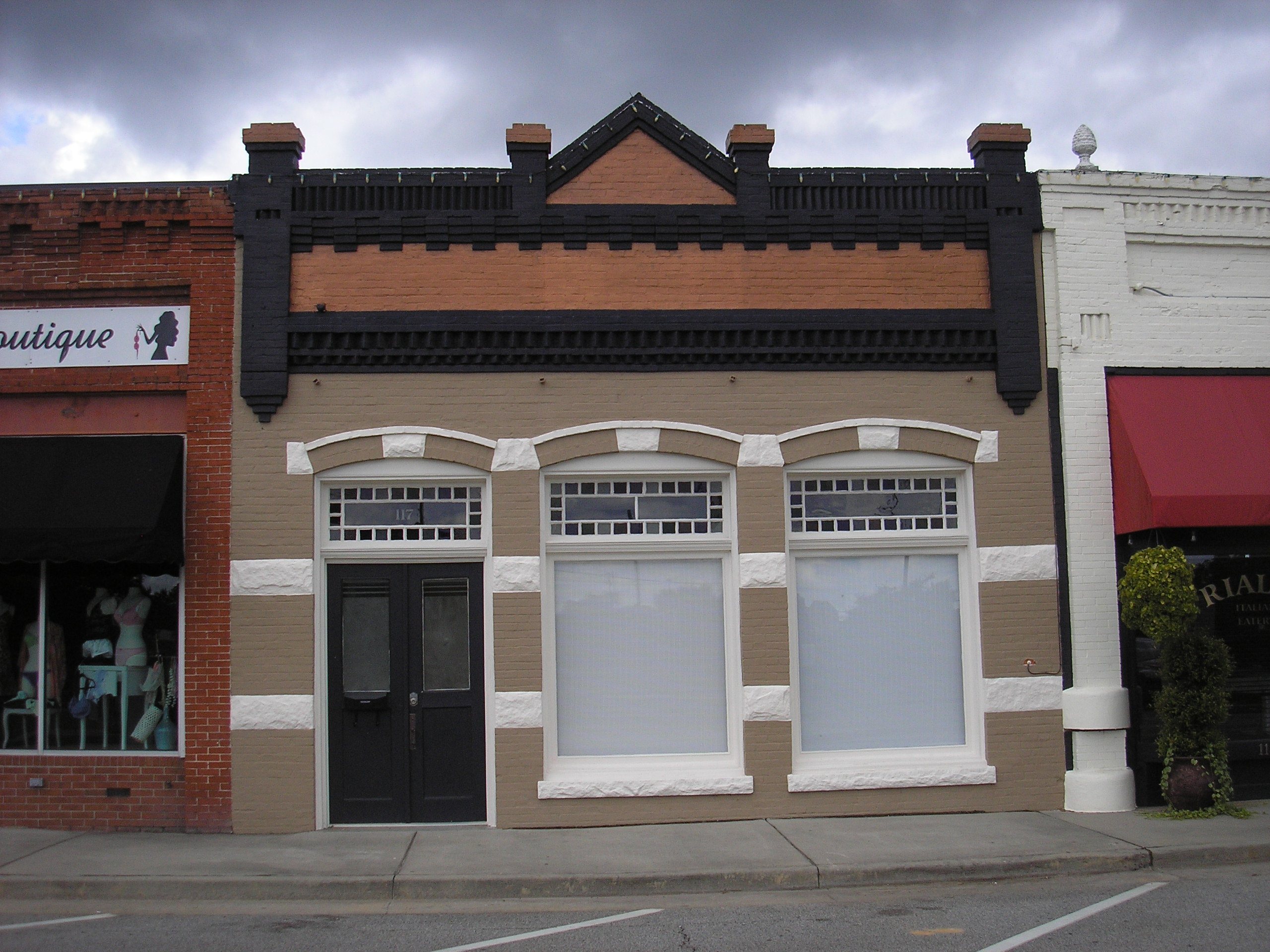

- Location within Georgia
- Location: 117 SE. Main St., Vidalia, Georgia
- Coordinates: 32°13′6″N 82°24′42″W
- Area: less than one acre
- Built: c.1901
- Architectural style: decorated vernacular Victorian
- NRHP reference No.: 91002004
- Added to NRHP: January 22, 1992

The Citizens Bank of Vidalia in Vidalia, Georgia is listed on the National Register of Historic Places. It is also a contributing building in the Vidalia Commercial Historic District.

It was built in c.1901 and was the first bank built in Vidalia. The bank was founded by the town's founder, W.T. Jenkins, owner of a turpentine company.
