= Tennessee's congressional delegations =

These are tables of congressional delegations from Tennessee to the United States House of Representatives and the United States Senate.

The current dean of the Tennessee delegation is Senator Marsha Blackburn, having served in Congress continuously since 2003. Blackburn served in the House until 2019, when she assumed her seat in the Senate that she won in 2018.

== U.S. House of Representatives ==
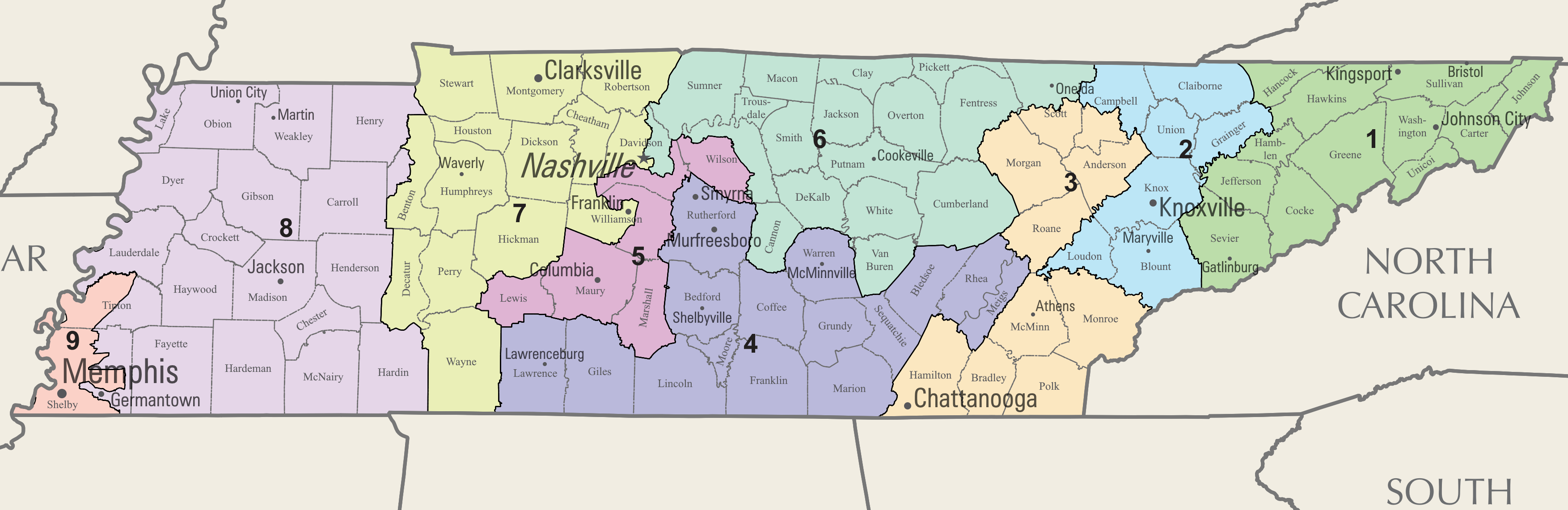
Tennessee's congressional districts from 2023–2027

=== Current members ===
List of current members United States House from Tennessee, their terms in office, district boundaries, and the district political ratings according to the CPVI. The delegation has 9 members: 8 Republicans and 1 Democrat.

District	Member (residence)	Party	Incumbency	CPVI	District map
1st	Diana Harshbarger (Kingsport)	Republican	since January 3, 2021	R+29	
2nd	Tim Burchett (Knoxville)	Republican	since January 3, 2019	R+17	
3rd	Chuck Fleischmann (Ooltewah)	Republican	since January 3, 2011	R+18	
4th	Scott DesJarlais (Sherwood)	Republican	since January 3, 2011	R+21	
5th	Andy Ogles (Columbia)	Republican	since January 3, 2023	R+8	
6th	John Rose (Cookeville)	Republican	since January 3, 2019	R+17	
7th	Matt Van Epps (Nashville)	Republican	since December 4, 2025	R+10	
8th	David Kustoff (Germantown)	Republican	since January 3, 2017	R+21	
9th	Steve Cohen (Memphis)	Democratic	since January 3, 2007	D+23	

=== 1789–1791: part of North Carolina ===
John Sevier was elected in North Carolina's 5th district, which included the territory of the former State of Franklin. He continued to serve after the entirety of his district was ceded to the federal government and formed the Southwest Territory.

=== 1793–1796: 1 non-voting delegate ===
Congress	Delegate
3rd (1793–1795)	James White
4th (1795–1796)	James White

=== 1796–1803: 1 seat ===
From achieving statehood on December 4, 1796, until 1803, Tennessee elected one representative, at-large, statewide.

Congress	At-large
4th (1796–1797)	Andrew Jackson (DR)
4th (1796–1797)	William C. C. Claiborne (DR)
5th (1797–1799)	William C. C. Claiborne (DR)
6th (1799–1801)	William C. C. Claiborne (DR)
7th (1801–1803)	William Dickson (DR)

=== 1803–1813: 3 seats ===
Tennessee elected three representatives, at-large, statewide for the 8th Congress, and then in separate districts after that.

Congress	1st at-large seat	2nd at-large seat	3rd at-large seat
8th (1803–1805)	William Dickson (DR)	George W. Campbell (DR)	John Rhea (DR)
Congress	1st district	2nd district	3rd district
9th (1805–1807)	John Rhea (DR)	George W. Campbell (DR)	William Dickson (DR)
10th (1807–1809)	John Rhea (DR)	George W. Campbell (DR)	Jesse Wharton (DR)
11th (1809–1811)	John Rhea (DR)	Robert Weakley (DR)	Pleasant Moorman; Miller (DR)
12th (1811–1813)	John Rhea (DR)	John Sevier (DR)	Felix Grundy (DR)

=== 1813–1823: 6 seats ===
Tennessee elected six representatives from districts.

Congress	1st district	2nd district	3rd district	4th district	5th district	6th district
13th (1813–1815)	John Rhea (DR)	John Sevier (DR)	Thomas K. Harris (DR)	John Henry Bowen (DR)	Felix Grundy (DR)	Parry Wayne; Humphries (DR)
13th (1813–1815)	John Rhea (DR)	John Sevier (DR)	Thomas K. Harris (DR)	John Henry Bowen (DR)	Newton Cannon (DR)	Parry Wayne; Humphries (DR)
14th (1815–1817)	Samuel Powell (DR)	John Sevier (DR)	Isaac Thomas (DR)	Bennett H. Henderson (DR)	Newton Cannon (DR)	James B. Reynolds (DR)
14th (1815–1817)	Samuel Powell (DR)	William Grainger; Blount (DR)	Isaac Thomas (DR)	Bennett H. Henderson (DR)	Newton Cannon (DR)	James B. Reynolds (DR)
15th (1817–1819)	John Rhea (DR)	William Grainger; Blount (DR)	Francis Jones (DR)	Samuel E. Hogg (DR)	Thomas Claiborne (DR)	George Washington; Lent Marr (DR)
16th (1819–1821)	John Rhea (DR)	John Alexander; Cocke (DR)	Francis Jones (DR)	Robert Allen (DR)	Newton Cannon (DR)	Henry Hunter; Bryan (DR)
17th (1821–1823)	John Rhea (DR)	John Alexander; Cocke (DR)	Francis Jones (DR)	Robert Allen (DR)	Newton Cannon (DR)	vacant

=== 1823–1833: 9 seats ===
From 1823 to 1833, Tennessee elected nine representatives.

Congress	District								
Congress	1st	2nd	3rd	4th	5th	6th	7th	8th	9th
18th (1823–1825)	John Blair (DR) (Note: Supported the Jackson faction in the 1824 United States presidential election.)	John Cocke (DR)	James Israel; Standifer (DR)	Jacob C. Isacks (DR)	Robert Allen (DR)	James T. Standford (DR)	Sam; Houston (DR)	James B. Reynolds (DR)	Adam Rankin; Alexander (DR)
19th (1825–1827)	John Blair (J)	John Cocke (J)	James Coffield; Mitchell (J)	Jacob C. Isacks (J)	Robert Allen (J)	James K. Polk (J)	Sam Houston (J)	John Hartwell; Marable (J)	Adam Rankin; Alexander (J)
20th (1827–1829)	John Blair (J)	Pryor Lea (D)	James Coffield; Mitchell (J)	Jacob C. Isacks (J)	Robert Desha (D)	James K. Polk (J)	John Bell (D)	John Hartwell; Marable (J)	Davy Crockett (NR)
21st (1829–1831)	John Blair (J)	Pryor Lea (D)	James Israel; Standifer (J)	Jacob C. Isacks (J)	Robert Desha (D)	James K. Polk (J)	John Bell (D)	Cave Johnson (J)	Davy Crockett (NR)
22nd (1831–1833)	John Blair (J)	Thomas Dickens; Arnold (NR)	James Israel; Standifer (J)	Jacob C. Isacks (J)	William Hall (J)	James K. Polk (J)	John Bell (D)	Cave Johnson (J)	William Fitzgerald (J)

=== 1833–1843: 13 seats ===
For the ten years following the 1830 census, Tennessee had its largest apportionment of 13 seats.

Congress	District												
Congress	1st	2nd	3rd	4th	5th	6th	7th	8th	9th	10th	11th	12th	13th
23rd (1833–1835)	John Blair (J)	Samuel; Bunch (J)	Luke Lea (J)	James Israel; Standifer (J)	John B. Forester (J)	Balie; Peyton (J)	John; Bell (J)	David W. Dickinson (J)	James K. Polk (J)	William Marshall; Inge (J)	Cave; Johnson (J)	Davy; Crockett (NR)	William; Claiborne; Dunlap (J)
24th (1835–1837)	William Blount; Carter (NR)	Samuel; Bunch (NR)	Luke Lea (NR)	James Israel; Standifer (NR)	John B. Forester (NR)	Balie; Peyton (NR)	John; Bell (NR)	Abram Pointdexter; Maury (NR)	James K. Polk (J)	Ebenezer J. Shields (NR)	Cave; Johnson (J)	Adam; Huntsman (J)	William; Claiborne; Dunlap (J)
25th (1837–1839)	William Blount; Carter (W)	Abraham; McClellan (D)	Joseph Lanier; Williams (W)	James Israel; Standifer (W)	Hopkins L. Turney (D)	William B. Campbell (W)	John; Bell (W)	Abram Pointdexter; Maury (W)	James K. Polk (D)	Ebenezer J. Shields (W)	Richard; Cheatham (W)	John Wesley; Crockett (W)	Kit; Williams (W)
25th (1837–1839)	William Blount; Carter (W)	Abraham; McClellan (D)	Joseph Lanier; Williams (W)	William Stone (W)	Hopkins L. Turney (D)	William B. Campbell (W)	John; Bell (W)	Abram Pointdexter; Maury (W)	James K. Polk (D)	Ebenezer J. Shields (W)	Richard; Cheatham (W)	John Wesley; Crockett (W)	Kit; Williams (W)
26th (1839–1841)	William Blount; Carter (W)	Abraham; McClellan (D)	Joseph Lanier; Williams (W)	Julius W. Blackwell (D)	Hopkins L. Turney (D)	William B. Campbell (W)	John; Bell (W)	Meredith; Pointdexter; Gentry (W)	Harvey M. Watterson (D)	Aaron V. Brown (D)	Cave; Johnson (D)	John Wesley; Crockett (W)	Kit; Williams (W)
27th (1841–1843)	Thomas D. Arnold (W)	Abraham; McClellan (D)	Joseph Lanier; Williams (W)	Thomas; Campbell (W)	Hopkins L. Turney (D)	William B. Campbell (W)	Robert L. Caruthers (W)	Meredith; Pointdexter; Gentry (W)	Harvey M. Watterson (D)	Aaron V. Brown (D)	Cave; Johnson (D)	Milton; Brown (W)	Kit; Williams (W)

=== 1843–1853: 11 seats ===
After the 1840 census, Tennessee lost 2 seats.

Congress	District										
Congress	1st	2nd	3rd	4th	5th	6th	7th	8th	9th	10th	11th
28th (1843–1845)	Andrew; Johnson (D)	William Tandy; Senter (W)	Julius W. Blackwell (D)	Alvan; Cullom (D)	George W. Jones (D)	Aaron V. Brown (D)	David W. Dickinson (W)	Joseph Hopkins; Peyton (W)	Cave; Johnson (D)	John Baptista; Ashe (W)	Milton Brown (W)
29th (1845–1847)	Andrew; Johnson (D)	William Michael; Cocke (W)	John Hervey; Crozier (W)	Alvan; Cullom (D)	George W. Jones (D)	Barclay; Martin (D)	Meredith; Pointdexter; Gentry (W)	Joseph Hopkins; Peyton (W)	Lucien Bonaparte; Chase (D)	Frederick P. Stanton (D)	Milton Brown (W)
29th (1845–1847)	Andrew; Johnson (D)	William Michael; Cocke (W)	John Hervey; Crozier (W)	Alvan; Cullom (D)	George W. Jones (D)	Barclay; Martin (D)	Meredith; Pointdexter; Gentry (W)	Edwin Hickman; Ewing (W)	Lucien Bonaparte; Chase (D)	Frederick P. Stanton (D)	Milton Brown (W)
30th (1847–1849)	Andrew; Johnson (D)	William Michael; Cocke (W)	John Hervey; Crozier (W)	Hugh Lawson; White Hill (D)	George W. Jones (D)	James Houston; Thomas (D)	Meredith; Pointdexter; Gentry (W)	Washington; Barrow (W)	Lucien Bonaparte; Chase (D)	Frederick P. Stanton (D)	William T. Haskell (W)
31st (1849–1851)	Andrew; Johnson (D)	Albert Galiton; Watkins (W)	Josiah M. Anderson (W)	John H. Savage (D)	George W. Jones (D)	James Houston; Thomas (D)	Meredith; Pointdexter; Gentry (W)	Andrew; Ewing (D)	Isham G. Harris (D)	Frederick P. Stanton (D)	Christopher Harris; Williams (W)
32nd (1851–1853)	Andrew; Johnson (D)	Albert Galiton; Watkins (W)	William M. Churchwell (D)	John H. Savage (D)	George W. Jones (D)	William Hawkins; Polk (ID)	Meredith; Pointdexter; Gentry (W)	William; Cullom (W)	Isham G. Harris (D)	Frederick P. Stanton (D)	Christopher Harris; Williams (W)

=== 1853–1863: 10 seats ===
After the 1850 census, Tennessee lost 1 seat.

Congress	District									
Congress	1st	2nd	3rd	4th	5th	6th	7th	8th	9th	10th
33rd (1853–1855)	Brookins Campbell (D)	William M. Churchwell (D)	Samuel Axley; Smith (D)	William; Cullom (W)	Charles; Ready (W)	George W. Jones (D)	Robert M. Bugg (W)	Felix; Zellicoffer (W)	Emerson; Etheridge (W)	Frederick P. Stanton (D)
33rd (1853–1855)	Nathaniel; Taylor (W)	William M. Churchwell (D)	Samuel Axley; Smith (D)	William; Cullom (W)	Charles; Ready (W)	George W. Jones (D)	Robert M. Bugg (W)	Felix; Zellicoffer (W)	Emerson; Etheridge (W)	Frederick P. Stanton (D)
34th (1855–1857)	Albert Gailton; Watkins (D)	William Henry; Sneed (KN)	Samuel Axley; Smith (D)	John H. Savage (D)	Charles; Ready (KN)	George W. Jones (D)	John Vines; Wright (D)	Felix; Zelicoffer (KN)	Emerson; Etheridge (KN)	Thomas; Rivers (KN)
35th (1857–1859)	Albert Gailton; Watkins (D)	Horace; Maynard (KN)	Samuel Axley; Smith (D)	John H. Savage (D)	Charles; Ready (KN)	George W. Jones (D)	John Vines; Wright (D)	Felix; Zelicoffer (KN)	John D. C. Atkins (D)	William T. Avery (D)
36th (1859–1861)	Thomas A. R. Nelson (O)	Horace; Maynard (O)	Reese Bowen; Brabson (O)	William B. Stokes (O)	Robert H. Hatton (O)	James Houston; Thomas (D)	John Vines; Wright (D)	James Minor; Quarles (O)	Emerson; Etheridge (O)	William T. Avery (D)
37th (1861–1863)	Nelson re-elected but failed to take office	Horace; Maynard (U)	George Washington; Bridges (U)	A. J. Clements (U)	American Civil War					

=== 1863–1873: 8 seats ===
After the 1860 census, Tennessee lost 2 seats.

Congress	District							
Congress	1st	2nd	3rd	4th	5th	6th	7th	8th
38th (1863–1865)	American Civil War							
39th (1865–1867)	Nathaniel Green; Taylor (C)	Horace; Maynard (UU)	William B. Stokes (UU)	Edmund Cooper (C)	William B. Campbell (C)	Samuel Mayes; Arnell (UU)	Isaac Roberts; Hawkins (UU)	John W. Leftwich (C)
40th (1867–1869)	Roderick R. Butler (R)	Horace; Maynard (R)	William B. Stokes (R)	James Mullins (R)	John Trimble (R)	Samuel Mayes; Arnell (R)	Isaac Roberts; Hawkins (R)	David A. Nunn (R)
41st (1869–1871)	Roderick R. Butler (R)	Horace; Maynard (R)	William B. Stokes (R)	Lewis Tillman (R)	William F. Prosser (R)	Samuel Mayes; Arnell (R)	Isaac Roberts; Hawkins (R)	William J. Smith (R)
42nd (1871–1873)	Roderick R. Butler (R)	Horace; Maynard (R)	Abraham Ellison; Garrett (D)	John M. Bright (D)	Edward Isaac; Golladay (D)	Washington C. Whitthorne (D)	Robert Porter; Caldwell (D)	William Wirt; Vaughan (D)

=== 1873–1933: 10 seats ===
After the 1870 census, Tennessee gained 2 seats.

Congress	District									
Congress	1st	2nd	3rd	4th	5th	6th	7th	8th	9th	10th
43rd (Note: In the 43rd Congress, Horace Maynard was elected to the state's at-large seat.) (1873–1875)	Roderick R. Butler (R)	Jacob; Montgomery; Thornburgh (R)	William; Crutchfield (R)	John M. Bright (D)	Horace; Harrison (R)	Washington C. Whitthorne (D)	John D. C. Atkins (D)	David A. Nunn (R)	Barbour; Lewis (R)	Horace; Maynard (R)
44th (1875–1877)	William; McFarland (D)	Jacob; Montgomery; Thornburgh (R)	George G. Dibrell (D)	Samuel McClary; Fite (D)	John M. Bright (D)	John F. House (D)	Washington C. Whitthorne (D)	John D. C. Atkins (D)	William Parker; Caldwell (D)	H. Casey; Young (D)
44th (1875–1877)	William; McFarland (D)	Jacob; Montgomery; Thornburgh (R)	George G. Dibrell (D)	Haywood Yancey; Riddle (D)	John M. Bright (D)	John F. House (D)	Washington C. Whitthorne (D)	John D. C. Atkins (D)	William Parker; Caldwell (D)	H. Casey; Young (D)
45th (1877–1879)	James Henry; Randolph (R)	Jacob; Montgomery; Thornburgh (R)	George G. Dibrell (D)	Haywood Yancey; Riddle (D)	John M. Bright (D)	John F. House (D)	Washington C. Whitthorne (D)	John D. C. Atkins (D)	William Parker; Caldwell (D)	H. Casey; Young (D)
46th (1879–1881)	Robert Love; Taylor (D)	Jacob; Montgomery; Thornburgh (R)	George G. Dibrell (D)	Leonidas C. Houk (R)	John M. Bright (D)	John F. House (D)	Washington C. Whitthorne (D)	John D. C. Atkins (D)	Benton; McMillin (D)	Charles B. Simonton (D)
47th (1881–1883)	A. H. Pettibone (R)	Richard; Warner (D)	George G. Dibrell (D)	Leonidas C. Houk (R)	William Robert; Moore (R)	John F. House (D)	Washington C. Whitthorne (D)	John D. C. Atkins (D)	Benton; McMillin (D)	Charles B. Simonton (D)
48th (1883–1885)	A. H. Pettibone (R)	Richard; Warner (D)	George G. Dibrell (D)	Leonidas C. Houk (R)	Andrew Jackson; Caldwell (D)	John Goff; Ballentine (D)	John May; Taylor (D)	Rice Alexander; Pierce (D)	Benton; McMillin (D)	H. Casey; Young (D)
49th (1885–1887)	A. H. Pettibone (R)	John R. Neal (D)	James D. Richardson (D)	Leonidas C. Houk (R)	Andrew Jackson; Caldwell (D)	John Goff; Ballentine (D)	John May; Taylor (D)	Presley T. Glass (D)	Benton; McMillin (D)	Zachary; Taylor (R)
50th (1887–1889)	Roderick R. Butler (R)	John R. Neal (D)	James D. Richardson (D)	Leonidas C. Houk (R)	Joseph E. Washington (D)	Washington C. Whitthorne (D)	Benjamin A. Enloe (D)	Presley T. Glass (D)	Benton; McMillin (D)	James; Phelan Jr. (D)
51st (1889–1891)	Alfred A. Taylor (R)	H. Clay; Evans (R)	James D. Richardson (D)	Leonidas C. Houk (R)	Joseph E. Washington (D)	Washington C. Whitthorne (D)	Benjamin A. Enloe (D)	Rice Alexander; Pierce (D)	Benton; McMillin (D)	James; Phelan Jr. (D)
52nd (1891–1893)	Alfred A. Taylor (R)	Henry C. Snodgrass (D)	James D. Richardson (D)	Leonidas C. Houk (R)	Joseph E. Washington (D)	Nicholas N. Cox (D)	Benjamin A. Enloe (D)	Rice Alexander; Pierce (D)	Benton; McMillin (D)	Josiah; Patterson (D)
52nd (1891–1893)	Alfred A. Taylor (R)	Henry C. Snodgrass (D)	James D. Richardson (D)	John C. Houk (R)	Joseph E. Washington (D)	Nicholas N. Cox (D)	Benjamin A. Enloe (D)	Rice Alexander; Pierce (D)	Benton; McMillin (D)	Josiah; Patterson (D)
53rd (1893–1895)	Alfred A. Taylor (R)	Henry C. Snodgrass (D)	James D. Richardson (D)	John C. Houk (R)	Joseph E. Washington (D)	Nicholas N. Cox (D)	Benjamin A. Enloe (D)	James C. McDearmon (D)	Benton; McMillin (D)	Josiah; Patterson (D)
54th (1895–1897)	William Coleman; Anderson (R)	Henry R. Gibson (R)	James D. Richardson (D)	Foster V. Brown (R)	Joseph E. Washington (D)	Nicholas N. Cox (D)	John E. McCall (R)	James C. McDearmon (D)	Benton; McMillin (D)	Josiah; Patterson (D)
55th (1897–1899)	Walter P. Brownlow (R)	Henry R. Gibson (R)	James D. Richardson (D)	John A. Moon (D)	John W. Gaines (D)	Nicholas N. Cox (D)	Thetus W. Sims (D)	Rice Alexander; Pierce (D)	Benton; McMillin (D)	Edward W. Carmack (D)
56th (1899–1901)	Walter P. Brownlow (R)	Henry R. Gibson (R)	James D. Richardson (D)	John A. Moon (D)	John W. Gaines (D)	Nicholas N. Cox (D)	Thetus W. Sims (D)	Rice Alexander; Pierce (D)	Charles Edward; Snodgrass (D)	Edward W. Carmack (D)
57th (1901–1903)	Walter P. Brownlow (R)	Henry R. Gibson (R)	James D. Richardson (D)	John A. Moon (D)	John W. Gaines (D)	Lemuel P. Padgett (D)	Thetus W. Sims (D)	Rice Alexander; Pierce (D)	Charles Edward; Snodgrass (D)	Malcolm R. Patterson (D)
58th (1903–1905)	Walter P. Brownlow (R)	Henry R. Gibson (R)	James D. Richardson (D)	John A. Moon (D)	John W. Gaines (D)	Lemuel P. Padgett (D)	Thetus W. Sims (D)	Rice Alexander; Pierce (D)	Morgan C. Fitzpatrick (D)	Malcolm R. Patterson (D)
59th (1905–1907)	Walter P. Brownlow (R)	Nathan W. Hale (R)	Mounce G. Butler (D)	John A. Moon (D)	John W. Gaines (D)	Lemuel P. Padgett (D)	Thetus W. Sims (D)	William C. Houston (D)	Finis J. Garrett (D)	Malcolm R. Patterson (D)
60th (1907–1909)	Walter P. Brownlow (R)	Nathan W. Hale (R)	Cordell; Hull (D)	John A. Moon (D)	John W. Gaines (D)	Lemuel P. Padgett (D)	Thetus W. Sims (D)	William C. Houston (D)	Finis J. Garrett (D)	George; Gordon (D)
61st (1909–1911)	Walter P. Brownlow (R)	Richard W. Austin (R)	Cordell; Hull (D)	John A. Moon (D)	Jo Byrns (D)	Lemuel P. Padgett (D)	Thetus W. Sims (D)	William C. Houston (D)	Finis J. Garrett (D)	George; Gordon (D)
61st (1909–1911)	Zachary Massey (R)	Richard W. Austin (R)	Cordell; Hull (D)	John A. Moon (D)	Jo Byrns (D)	Lemuel P. Padgett (D)	Thetus W. Sims (D)	William C. Houston (D)	Finis J. Garrett (D)	George; Gordon (D)
62nd (1911–1913)	Sam R. Sells (R)	Richard W. Austin (R)	Cordell; Hull (D)	John A. Moon (D)	Jo Byrns (D)	Lemuel P. Padgett (D)	Thetus W. Sims (D)	William C. Houston (D)	Finis J. Garrett (D)	George; Gordon (D)
62nd (1911–1913)	Sam R. Sells (R)	Richard W. Austin (R)	Cordell; Hull (D)	John A. Moon (D)	Jo Byrns (D)	Lemuel P. Padgett (D)	Thetus W. Sims (D)	William C. Houston (D)	Finis J. Garrett (D)	Kenneth; McKellar (D)
63rd (1913–1915)	Sam R. Sells (R)	Richard W. Austin (R)	Cordell; Hull (D)	John A. Moon (D)	Jo Byrns (D)	Lemuel P. Padgett (D)	Thetus W. Sims (D)	William C. Houston (D)	Finis J. Garrett (D)	Kenneth; McKellar (D)
64th (1915–1917)	Sam R. Sells (R)	Richard W. Austin (R)	Cordell; Hull (D)	John A. Moon (D)	Jo Byrns (D)	Lemuel P. Padgett (D)	Thetus W. Sims (D)	William C. Houston (D)	Finis J. Garrett (D)	Kenneth; McKellar (D)
65th (1917–1919)	Sam R. Sells (R)	Richard W. Austin (R)	Cordell; Hull (D)	John A. Moon (D)	Jo Byrns (D)	Lemuel P. Padgett (D)	Thetus W. Sims (D)	William C. Houston (D)	Finis J. Garrett (D)	Hubert; Fisher (D)
66th (1919–1921)	Sam R. Sells (R)	J. Will; Taylor (R)	Cordell; Hull (D)	John A. Moon (D)	Jo Byrns (D)	Lemuel P. Padgett (D)	Thetus W. Sims (D)	Ewin L. Davis (D)	Finis J. Garrett (D)	Hubert; Fisher (D)
67th (1921–1923)	B. Carroll; Reece (R)	J. Will; Taylor (R)	Joe; Brown (R)	Wynne F. Clouse (R)	Jo Byrns (D)	Lemuel P. Padgett (D)	Lon A. Scott (R)	Ewin L. Davis (D)	Finis J. Garrett (D)	Hubert; Fisher (D)
67th (1921–1923)	B. Carroll; Reece (R)	J. Will; Taylor (R)	Joe; Brown (R)	Wynne F. Clouse (R)	Jo Byrns (D)	Clarence Turner (D)	Lon A. Scott (R)	Ewin L. Davis (D)	Finis J. Garrett (D)	Hubert; Fisher (D)
68th (1923–1925)	B. Carroll; Reece (R)	J. Will; Taylor (R)	Samuel Davis; McReynolds (D)	Cordell; Hull (D)	Jo Byrns (D)	William C. Salmon (D)	Gordon; Browning (D)	Ewin L. Davis (D)	Finis J. Garrett (D)	Hubert; Fisher (D)
69th (1925–1927)	B. Carroll; Reece (R)	J. Will; Taylor (R)	Samuel Davis; McReynolds (D)	Cordell; Hull (D)	Jo Byrns (D)	Edward E. Eslick (D)	Gordon; Browning (D)	Ewin L. Davis (D)	Finis J. Garrett (D)	Hubert; Fisher (D)
70th (1927–1929)	B. Carroll; Reece (R)	J. Will; Taylor (R)	Samuel Davis; McReynolds (D)	Cordell; Hull (D)	Jo Byrns (D)	Edward E. Eslick (D)	Gordon; Browning (D)	Ewin L. Davis (D)	Finis J. Garrett (D)	Hubert; Fisher (D)
71st (1929–1931)	B. Carroll; Reece (R)	J. Will; Taylor (R)	Samuel Davis; McReynolds (D)	Cordell; Hull (D)	Jo Byrns (D)	Edward E. Eslick (D)	Gordon; Browning (D)	Ewin L. Davis (D)	Jere; Cooper (D)	Hubert; Fisher (D)
72nd (1931–1933)	Oscar; Lovette (R)	J. Will; Taylor (R)	Samuel Davis; McReynolds (D)	John Ridley; Mitchell (D)	Jo Byrns (D)	Edward E. Eslick (D)	Gordon; Browning (D)	Ewin L. Davis (D)	Jere; Cooper (D)	E. H. Crump (D)
72nd (1931–1933)	Oscar; Lovette (R)	J. Will; Taylor (R)	Samuel Davis; McReynolds (D)	John Ridley; Mitchell (D)	Jo Byrns (D)	Willa Blake; Eslick (D)	Gordon; Browning (D)	Ewin L. Davis (D)	Jere; Cooper (D)	E. H. Crump (D)

=== 1933–1943: 9 seats ===
After the 1930 census, Tennessee lost 1 seat.

Congress	District								
Congress	1st	2nd	3rd	4th	5th	6th	7th	8th	9th
73rd (1933–1935)	B. Carroll; Reece (R)	J. Will; Taylor (R)	Samuel Davis; McReynolds (D)	John Ridley; Mitchell (D)	Jo Byrns (D)	Clarence W. Turner (D)	Gordon; Browning (D)	Jere; Cooper (D)	E. H. Crump (D)
74th (1935–1937)	B. Carroll; Reece (R)	J. Will; Taylor (R)	Samuel Davis; McReynolds (D)	John Ridley; Mitchell (D)	Jo Byrns (D)	Clarence W. Turner (D)	Herron C. Pearson (D)	Jere; Cooper (D)	Walter; Chandler (D)
75th (1937–1939)	B. Carroll; Reece (R)	J. Will; Taylor (R)	Samuel Davis; McReynolds (D)	John Ridley; Mitchell (D)	Richard Merrill; Atkinson (D)	Clarence W. Turner (D)	Herron C. Pearson (D)	Jere; Cooper (D)	Walter; Chandler (D)
76th (1939–1941)	B. Carroll; Reece (R)	J. Will; Taylor (R)	Samuel Davis; McReynolds (D)	Albert; Gore Sr. (D)	Joseph W. Byrns Jr. (D)	Clarence W. Turner (D)	Herron C. Pearson (D)	Jere; Cooper (D)	Walter; Chandler (D)
76th (1939–1941)	B. Carroll; Reece (R)	John; Jennings (R)	Estes; Kefauver (D)	Albert; Gore Sr. (D)	Joseph W. Byrns Jr. (D)	W. Wirt; Courtney (D)	Herron C. Pearson (D)	Jere; Cooper (D)	Clifford; Davis (D)
77th (1941–1943)	B. Carroll; Reece (R)	John; Jennings (R)	Estes; Kefauver (D)	Albert; Gore Sr. (D)	Percy Priest (D)	W. Wirt; Courtney (D)	Herron C. Pearson (D)	Jere; Cooper (D)	Clifford; Davis (D)

=== 1943–1953: 10 seats ===
After the 1940 census, Tennessee gained 1 seat.

Congress	District									
Congress	1st	2nd	3rd	4th	5th	6th	7th	8th	9th	10th
78th (1943–1945)	B. Carroll Reece (R)	John Jennings (R)	Estes; Kefauver (D)	Albert Gore; Sr. (D)	Jim N. McCord (D)	Percy; Priest (D)	W. Wirt; Courtney (D)	Tom J. Murray (D)	Jere; Cooper (D)	Clifford; Davis (D)
79th (1945–1947)	B. Carroll Reece (R)	John Jennings (R)	Estes; Kefauver (D)	Albert Gore; Sr. (D)	Harold Earthman (D)	Percy; Priest (D)	W. Wirt; Courtney (D)	Tom J. Murray (D)	Jere; Cooper (D)	Clifford; Davis (D)
80th (1947–1949)	Dayton E. Phillips (R)	John Jennings (R)	Estes; Kefauver (D)	Albert Gore; Sr. (D)	Joe L. Evins (D)	Percy; Priest (D)	W. Wirt; Courtney (D)	Tom J. Murray (D)	Jere; Cooper (D)	Clifford; Davis (D)
81st (1949–1951)	Dayton E. Phillips (R)	John Jennings (R)	James B. Frazier Jr. (D)	Albert Gore; Sr. (D)	Joe L. Evins (D)	Percy; Priest (D)	James P. Sutton (D)	Tom J. Murray (D)	Jere; Cooper (D)	Clifford; Davis (D)
82nd (1951–1953)	B. Carroll Reece (R)	Howard Baker Sr. (R)	James B. Frazier Jr. (D)	Albert Gore; Sr. (D)	Joe L. Evins (D)	Percy; Priest (D)	James P. Sutton (D)	Tom J. Murray (D)	Jere; Cooper (D)	Clifford; Davis (D)

=== 1953–1973: 9 seats ===
After the 1950 census, Tennessee lost 1 seat.

Congress	District								
Congress	1st	2nd	3rd	4th	5th	6th	7th	8th	9th
83rd (1953–1955)	B. Carroll Reece (R)	Howard; Baker Sr. (R)	James B. Frazier Jr. (D)	Joe L. Evins (D)	Percy Priest (D)	James P. Sutton (D)	Tom J. Murray (D)	Jere Cooper (D)	Clifford Davis (D)
84th (1955–1957)	B. Carroll Reece (R)	Howard; Baker Sr. (R)	James B. Frazier Jr. (D)	Joe L. Evins (D)	Percy Priest (D)	Ross Bass (D)	Tom J. Murray (D)	Jere Cooper (D)	Clifford Davis (D)
85th (1957–1959)	B. Carroll Reece (R)	Howard; Baker Sr. (R)	James B. Frazier Jr. (D)	Joe L. Evins (D)	J. Carlton; Loser (D)	Ross Bass (D)	Tom J. Murray (D)	Jere Cooper (D)	Clifford Davis (D)
85th (1957–1959)	B. Carroll Reece (R)	Howard; Baker Sr. (R)	James B. Frazier Jr. (D)	Joe L. Evins (D)	J. Carlton; Loser (D)	Ross Bass (D)	Tom J. Murray (D)	Fats Everett (D)	Clifford Davis (D)
86th (1959–1961)	B. Carroll Reece (R)	Howard; Baker Sr. (R)	James B. Frazier Jr. (D)	Joe L. Evins (D)	J. Carlton; Loser (D)	Ross Bass (D)	Tom J. Murray (D)	Fats Everett (D)	Clifford Davis (D)
87th (1961–1963)	B. Carroll Reece (R)	Howard; Baker Sr. (R)	James B. Frazier Jr. (D)	Joe L. Evins (D)	J. Carlton; Loser (D)	Ross Bass (D)	Tom J. Murray (D)	Fats Everett (D)	Clifford Davis (D)
87th (1961–1963)	Louise G. Reece (R)	Howard; Baker Sr. (R)	James B. Frazier Jr. (D)	Joe L. Evins (D)	J. Carlton; Loser (D)	Ross Bass (D)	Tom J. Murray (D)	Fats Everett (D)	Clifford Davis (D)
88th (1963–1965)	Jimmy Quillen (R)	Howard; Baker Sr. (R)	Bill Brock (R)	Joe L. Evins (D)	Richard; Fulton (D)	Ross Bass (D)	Tom J. Murray (D)	Fats Everett (D)	Clifford Davis (D)
88th (1963–1965)	Jimmy Quillen (R)	Irene Baker (R)	Bill Brock (R)	Joe L. Evins (D)	Richard; Fulton (D)	Ross Bass (D)	Tom J. Murray (D)	Fats Everett (D)	Clifford Davis (D)
89th (1965–1967)	Jimmy Quillen (R)	John; Duncan Sr. (R)	Bill Brock (R)	Joe L. Evins (D)	Richard; Fulton (D)	William; Anderson (D)	Tom J. Murray (D)	Fats Everett (D)	George W. Grider (D)
90th (1967–1969)	Jimmy Quillen (R)	John; Duncan Sr. (R)	Bill Brock (R)	Joe L. Evins (D)	Richard; Fulton (D)	William; Anderson (D)	Ray Blanton (D)	Fats Everett (D)	Dan Kuykendall (R)
91st (1969–1971)	Jimmy Quillen (R)	John; Duncan Sr. (R)	Bill Brock (R)	Joe L. Evins (D)	Richard; Fulton (D)	William; Anderson (D)	Ray Blanton (D)	Fats Everett (D)	Dan Kuykendall (R)
91st (1969–1971)	Jimmy Quillen (R)	John; Duncan Sr. (R)	Bill Brock (R)	Joe L. Evins (D)	Richard; Fulton (D)	William; Anderson (D)	Ray Blanton (D)	Ed Jones (D)	Dan Kuykendall (R)
92nd (1971–1973)	Jimmy Quillen (R)	John; Duncan Sr. (R)	LaMar Baker (R)	Joe L. Evins (D)	Richard; Fulton (D)	William; Anderson (D)	Ray Blanton (D)	Ed Jones (D)	Dan Kuykendall (R)

=== 1973–1983: 8 seats ===
After the 1970 census, Tennessee lost 1 seat.

Congress	District							
Congress	1st	2nd	3rd	4th	5th	6th	7th	8th
93rd (1973–1975)	Jimmy; Quillen (R)	John Duncan; Sr. (R)	LaMar Baker (R)	Joe L. Evins (D)	Richard Fulton (D)	Robin; Beard (R)	Ed Jones (D)	Dan Kuykendall (R)
94th (1975–1977)	Jimmy; Quillen (R)	John Duncan; Sr. (R)	Marilyn; Lloyd (D)	Joe L. Evins (D)	Richard Fulton (D)	Robin; Beard (R)	Ed Jones (D)	Harold Ford Sr. (D)
94th (1975–1977)	Jimmy; Quillen (R)	John Duncan; Sr. (R)	Marilyn; Lloyd (D)	Joe L. Evins (D)	Clifford Allen (D)	Robin; Beard (R)	Ed Jones (D)	Harold Ford Sr. (D)
95th (1977–1979)	Jimmy; Quillen (R)	John Duncan; Sr. (R)	Marilyn; Lloyd (D)	Al Gore (D)	Clifford Allen (D)	Robin; Beard (R)	Ed Jones (D)	Harold Ford Sr. (D)
96th (1979–1981)	Jimmy; Quillen (R)	John Duncan; Sr. (R)	Marilyn; Lloyd (D)	Al Gore (D)	Bill Boner (D)	Robin; Beard (R)	Ed Jones (D)	Harold Ford Sr. (D)
97th (1981–1983)	Jimmy; Quillen (R)	John Duncan; Sr. (R)	Marilyn; Lloyd (D)	Al Gore (D)	Bill Boner (D)	Robin; Beard (R)	Ed Jones (D)	Harold Ford Sr. (D)

=== 1983–present: 9 seats ===
After the 1980 census, Tennessee gained 1 seat.

Congress	District								
Congress	1st	2nd	3rd	4th	5th	6th	7th	8th	9th
98th (1983–1985)	Jimmy; Quillen (R)	John; Duncan; Sr. (R)	Marilyn; Lloyd (D)	Jim; Cooper (D)	Bill; Boner (D)	Al Gore (D)	Don; Sundquist (R)	Ed Jones (D)	Harold; Ford Sr. (D)
99th (1985–1987)	Jimmy; Quillen (R)	John; Duncan; Sr. (R)	Marilyn; Lloyd (D)	Jim; Cooper (D)	Bill; Boner (D)	Bart; Gordon (D)	Don; Sundquist (R)	Ed Jones (D)	Harold; Ford Sr. (D)
100th (1987–1989)	Jimmy; Quillen (R)	John; Duncan; Sr. (R)	Marilyn; Lloyd (D)	Jim; Cooper (D)	Bill; Boner (D)	Bart; Gordon (D)	Don; Sundquist (R)	Ed Jones (D)	Harold; Ford Sr. (D)
100th (1987–1989)	Jimmy; Quillen (R)	Jimmy; Duncan (R)	Marilyn; Lloyd (D)	Jim; Cooper (D)	Bob; Clement (D)	Bart; Gordon (D)	Don; Sundquist (R)	Ed Jones (D)	Harold; Ford Sr. (D)
101st (1989–1991)	Jimmy; Quillen (R)	Jimmy; Duncan (R)	Marilyn; Lloyd (D)	Jim; Cooper (D)	Bob; Clement (D)	Bart; Gordon (D)	Don; Sundquist (R)	John; Tanner (D)	Harold; Ford Sr. (D)
102nd (1991–1993)	Jimmy; Quillen (R)	Jimmy; Duncan (R)	Marilyn; Lloyd (D)	Jim; Cooper (D)	Bob; Clement (D)	Bart; Gordon (D)	Don; Sundquist (R)	John; Tanner (D)	Harold; Ford Sr. (D)
103rd (1993–1995)	Jimmy; Quillen (R)	Jimmy; Duncan (R)	Marilyn; Lloyd (D)	Jim; Cooper (D)	Bob; Clement (D)	Bart; Gordon (D)	Don; Sundquist (R)	John; Tanner (D)	Harold; Ford Sr. (D)
104th (1995–1997)	Jimmy; Quillen (R)	Jimmy; Duncan (R)	Zach; Wamp (R)	Van; Hilleary (R)	Bob; Clement (D)	Bart; Gordon (D)	Ed; Bryant (R)	John; Tanner (D)	Harold; Ford Sr. (D)
105th (1997–1999)	Bill Jenkins (R)	Jimmy; Duncan (R)	Zach; Wamp (R)	Van; Hilleary (R)	Bob; Clement (D)	Bart; Gordon (D)	Ed; Bryant (R)	John; Tanner (D)	Harold; Ford Jr. (D)
106th (1999–2001)	Bill Jenkins (R)	Jimmy; Duncan (R)	Zach; Wamp (R)	Van; Hilleary (R)	Bob; Clement (D)	Bart; Gordon (D)	Ed; Bryant (R)	John; Tanner (D)	Harold; Ford Jr. (D)
107th (2001–2003)	Bill Jenkins (R)	Jimmy; Duncan (R)	Zach; Wamp (R)	Van; Hilleary (R)	Bob; Clement (D)	Bart; Gordon (D)	Ed; Bryant (R)	John; Tanner (D)	Harold; Ford Jr. (D)
108th (2003–2005)	Bill Jenkins (R)	Jimmy; Duncan (R)	Zach; Wamp (R)	Lincoln; Davis (D)	Jim; Cooper (D)	Bart; Gordon (D)	Marsha; Blackburn (R)	John; Tanner (D)	Harold; Ford Jr. (D)
109th (2005–2007)	Bill Jenkins (R)	Jimmy; Duncan (R)	Zach; Wamp (R)	Lincoln; Davis (D)	Jim; Cooper (D)	Bart; Gordon (D)	Marsha; Blackburn (R)	John; Tanner (D)	Harold; Ford Jr. (D)
110th (2007–2009)	David Davis (R)	Jimmy; Duncan (R)	Zach; Wamp (R)	Lincoln; Davis (D)	Jim; Cooper (D)	Bart; Gordon (D)	Marsha; Blackburn (R)	John; Tanner (D)	Steve; Cohen (D)
111th (2009–2011)	Phil Roe (R)	Jimmy; Duncan (R)	Zach; Wamp (R)	Lincoln; Davis (D)	Jim; Cooper (D)	Bart; Gordon (D)	Marsha; Blackburn (R)	John; Tanner (D)	Steve; Cohen (D)
112th (2011–2013)	Phil Roe (R)	Jimmy; Duncan (R)	Chuck; Fleischmann (R)	Scott; DesJarlais (R)	Jim; Cooper (D)	Diane; Black (R)	Marsha; Blackburn (R)	Stephen; Fincher (R)	Steve; Cohen (D)
113th (2013–2015)	Phil Roe (R)	Jimmy; Duncan (R)	Chuck; Fleischmann (R)	Scott; DesJarlais (R)	Jim; Cooper (D)	Diane; Black (R)	Marsha; Blackburn (R)	Stephen; Fincher (R)	Steve; Cohen (D)
114th (2015–2017)	Phil Roe (R)	Jimmy; Duncan (R)	Chuck; Fleischmann (R)	Scott; DesJarlais (R)	Jim; Cooper (D)	Diane; Black (R)	Marsha; Blackburn (R)	Stephen; Fincher (R)	Steve; Cohen (D)
115th (2017–2019)	Phil Roe (R)	Jimmy; Duncan (R)	Chuck; Fleischmann (R)	Scott; DesJarlais (R)	Jim; Cooper (D)	Diane; Black (R)	Marsha; Blackburn (R)	David; Kustoff (R)	Steve; Cohen (D)
116th (2019–2021)	Phil Roe (R)	Tim; Burchett (R)	Chuck; Fleischmann (R)	Scott; DesJarlais (R)	Jim; Cooper (D)	John; Rose (R)	Mark; Green (R)	David; Kustoff (R)	Steve; Cohen (D)
117th (2021–2023)	Diana; Harshbarger (R)	Tim; Burchett (R)	Chuck; Fleischmann (R)	Scott; DesJarlais (R)	Jim; Cooper (D)	John; Rose (R)	Mark; Green (R)	David; Kustoff (R)	Steve; Cohen (D)
118th (2023–2025)	Diana; Harshbarger (R)	Tim; Burchett (R)	Chuck; Fleischmann (R)	Scott; DesJarlais (R)	Andy; Ogles (R)	John; Rose (R)	Mark; Green (R)	David; Kustoff (R)	Steve; Cohen (D)
119th (2025–2027)	Diana; Harshbarger (R)	Tim; Burchett (R)	Chuck; Fleischmann (R)	Scott; DesJarlais (R)	Andy; Ogles (R)	John; Rose (R)	Mark; Green (R)	David; Kustoff (R)	Steve; Cohen (D)
119th (2025–2027)	Diana; Harshbarger (R)	Tim; Burchett (R)	Chuck; Fleischmann (R)	Scott; DesJarlais (R)	Andy; Ogles (R)	John; Rose (R)	Matt; Van Epps (R)	David; Kustoff (R)	Steve; Cohen (D)
120th (2027–2029)	Diana; Harshbarger (R)	Tim; Burchett (R)	Chuck; Fleischmann (R)	Victoria; Broderick (D)	Charlie; Hatcher (R)	Johnny; Garrett (R)	Matt; Van Epps (R)	David; Kustoff (R)	Brent; Taylor (R)
Congress	1st	2nd	3rd	4th	5th	6th	7th	8th	9th
Congress	District								

== United States Senate ==
Current U.S. senators from Tennessee
Tennessee CPVI (2025): R+14	Class I senator	Class II senator
Tennessee CPVI (2025): R+14	Marsha Blackburn (senior senator) (Brentwood)	Bill Hagerty (junior senator) (Nashville)
Party	Republican	Republican
Incumbent since	January 3, 2019	January 3, 2021

Class I senator	Congress	Class II senator
William Cocke (DR)	4th (1795–1797)	William Blount (DR)
William Cocke (DR)	5th (1797–1799)	William Blount (DR)
Andrew Jackson (DR)	5th (1797–1799)	Joseph Anderson (DR)
Daniel Smith (DR)	5th (1797–1799)	Joseph Anderson (DR)
Joseph Anderson (DR)	6th (1799–1801)	William Cocke (DR)
Joseph Anderson (DR)	7th (1801–1803)	William Cocke (DR)
Joseph Anderson (DR)	8th (1803–1805)	William Cocke (DR)
Joseph Anderson (DR)	9th (1805–1807)	Daniel Smith (DR)
Joseph Anderson (DR)	10th (1807–1809)	Daniel Smith (DR)
Joseph Anderson (DR)	11th (1809–1811)	Daniel Smith (DR)
Joseph Anderson (DR)	11th (1809–1811)	Jenkin Whiteside (DR)
Joseph Anderson (DR)	12th (1811–1813)	Jenkin Whiteside (DR)
Joseph Anderson (DR)	12th (1811–1813)	George W. Campbell (DR)
Joseph Anderson (DR)	13th (1813–1815)	George W. Campbell (DR)
Joseph Anderson (DR)	13th (1813–1815)	Jesse Wharton (DR)
George W. Campbell (DR)	14th (1815–1817)	Jesse Wharton (DR)
George W. Campbell (DR)	14th (1815–1817)	John Williams (DR)
George W. Campbell (DR)	15th (1817–1819)	John Williams (DR)
John Eaton (DR)	15th (1817–1819)	John Williams (DR)
John Eaton (DR)	16th (1819–1821)	John Williams (DR)
John Eaton (DR)	17th (1821–1823)	John Williams (DR)
John Eaton (DR)	18th (1823–1825)	Andrew Jackson (DR)
John Eaton (J)	19th (1825–1827)	Andrew Jackson (J)
John Eaton (J)	19th (1825–1827)	Hugh Lawson White (J)
John Eaton (J)	20th (1827–1829)	Hugh Lawson White (J)
John Eaton (J)	21st (1829–1831)	Hugh Lawson White (J)
Felix Grundy (J)	21st (1829–1831)	Hugh Lawson White (J)
Felix Grundy (J)	22nd (1831–1833)	Hugh Lawson White (J)
Felix Grundy (J)	23rd (1833–1835)	Hugh Lawson White (J)
Felix Grundy (J)	24th (1835–1837)	Hugh Lawson White (NR)
Felix Grundy (D)	25th (1837–1839)	Hugh Lawson White (W)
Ephraim H. Foster (W)	25th (1837–1839)	Hugh Lawson White (W)
Felix Grundy (D)	26th (1839–1841)	Hugh Lawson White (W)
Alfred O. P. Nicholson (D)	26th (1839–1841)	Alexander O. Anderson (D)
Alfred O. P. Nicholson (D)	27th (1841–1843)	vacant
Ephraim H. Foster (W)	28th (1843–1845)	Spencer Jarnagin (W)
Hopkins L. Turney (D)	29th (1845–1847)	Spencer Jarnagin (W)
Hopkins L. Turney (D)	30th (1847–1849)	John Bell (W)
Hopkins L. Turney (D)	31st (1849–1851)	John Bell (W)
James C. Jones (W)	32nd (1851–1853)	John Bell (W)
James C. Jones (W)	33rd (1853–1855)	John Bell (W)
James C. Jones (W)	34th (1855–1857)	John Bell (W)
Andrew Johnson (D)	35th (1857–1859)	John Bell (KN)
Andrew Johnson (D)	36th (1859–1861)	Alfred O. P. Nicholson (D)
Andrew Johnson (D)	37th (1861–1863)	vacant
vacant	37th (1861–1863)	vacant
vacant	38th (1863–1865)	vacant
vacant	39th (1865–1867)	vacant
David T. Patterson (U)	39th (1865–1867)	Joseph S. Fowler (U)
David T. Patterson (D)	40th (1867–1869)	Joseph S. Fowler (R)
Parson Brownlow (R)	41st (1869–1871)	Joseph S. Fowler (R)
Parson Brownlow (R)	42nd (1871–1873)	Henry Cooper (D)
Parson Brownlow (R)	43rd (1873–1875)	Henry Cooper (D)
Andrew Johnson (D)	44th (1875–1877)	Henry Cooper (D)
David M. Key (D)	44th (1875–1877)	Henry Cooper (D)
James E. Bailey (D)	44th (1875–1877)	Henry Cooper (D)
James E. Bailey (D)	45th (1877–1879)	Isham G. Harris (D)
James E. Bailey (D)	46th (1879–1881)	Isham G. Harris (D)
Howell E. Jackson (D)	47th (1881–1883)	Isham G. Harris (D)
Howell E. Jackson (D)	48th (1883–1885)	Isham G. Harris (D)
Howell E. Jackson (D)	49th (1885–1887)	Isham G. Harris (D)
Washington C. Whitthorne (D)	49th (1885–1887)	Isham G. Harris (D)
William B. Bate (D)	50th (1887–1889)	Isham G. Harris (D)
William B. Bate (D)	51st (1889–1891)	Isham G. Harris (D)
William B. Bate (D)	52nd (1891–1893)	Isham G. Harris (D)
William B. Bate (D)	53rd (1893–1895)	Isham G. Harris (D)
William B. Bate (D)	54th (1895–1897)	Isham G. Harris (D)
William B. Bate (D)	55th (1897–1899)	Isham G. Harris (D)
William B. Bate (D)	55th (1897–1899)	Thomas B. Turley (D)
William B. Bate (D)	56th (1899–1901)	Thomas B. Turley (D)
William B. Bate (D)	57th (1901–1903)	Edward W. Carmack (D)
William B. Bate (D)	58th (1903–1905)	Edward W. Carmack (D)
William B. Bate (D)	59th (1905–1907)	Edward W. Carmack (D)
James B. Frazier (D)	59th (1905–1907)	Edward W. Carmack (D)
James B. Frazier (D)	60th (1907–1909)	Robert Love Taylor (D)
James B. Frazier (D)	61st (1909–1911)	Robert Love Taylor (D)
Luke Lea (D)	62nd (1911–1913)	Robert Love Taylor (D)
Luke Lea (D)	62nd (1911–1913)	Newell Sanders (R)
Luke Lea (D)	62nd (1911–1913)	William R. Webb (D)
Luke Lea (D)	63rd (1913–1915)	John K. Shields (D)
Luke Lea (D)	64th (1915–1917)	John K. Shields (D)
Kenneth McKellar (D)	65th (1917–1919)	John K. Shields (D)
Kenneth McKellar (D)	66th (1919–1921)	John K. Shields (D)
Kenneth McKellar (D)	67th (1921–1923)	John K. Shields (D)
Kenneth McKellar (D)	68th (1923–1925)	John K. Shields (D)
Kenneth McKellar (D)	69th (1925–1927)	Lawrence Tyson (D)
Kenneth McKellar (D)	70th (1927–1929)	Lawrence Tyson (D)
Kenneth McKellar (D)	71st (1929–1931)	Lawrence Tyson (D)
Kenneth McKellar (D)	71st (1929–1931)	William E. Brock (D)
Kenneth McKellar (D)	72nd (1931–1933)	Cordell Hull (D)
Kenneth McKellar (D)	73rd (1933–1935)	Nathan L. Bachman (D)
Kenneth McKellar (D)	74th (1935–1937)	Nathan L. Bachman (D)
Kenneth McKellar (D)	75th (1937–1939)	Nathan L. Bachman (D)
Kenneth McKellar (D)	75th (1937–1939)	George L. Berry (D)
Kenneth McKellar (D)	75th (1937–1939)	Tom Stewart (D)
Kenneth McKellar (D)	76th (1939–1941)	Tom Stewart (D)
Kenneth McKellar (D)	77th (1941–1943)	Tom Stewart (D)
Kenneth McKellar (D)	78th (1943–1945)	Tom Stewart (D)
Kenneth McKellar (D)	79th (1945–1947)	Tom Stewart (D)
Kenneth McKellar (D)	80th (1947–1949)	Tom Stewart (D)
Kenneth McKellar (D)	81st (1949–1951)	Estes Kefauver (D)
Kenneth McKellar (D)	82nd (1951–1953)	Estes Kefauver (D)
Albert Gore Sr. (D)	83rd (1953–1955)	Estes Kefauver (D)
Albert Gore Sr. (D)	84th (1955–1957)	Estes Kefauver (D)
Albert Gore Sr. (D)	85th (1957–1959)	Estes Kefauver (D)
Albert Gore Sr. (D)	86th (1959–1961)	Estes Kefauver (D)
Albert Gore Sr. (D)	87th (1961–1963)	Estes Kefauver (D)
Albert Gore Sr. (D)	88th (1963–1965)	Estes Kefauver (D)
Albert Gore Sr. (D)	88th (1963–1965)	Herbert S. Walters (D)
Albert Gore Sr. (D)	88th (1963–1965)	Ross Bass (D)
Albert Gore Sr. (D)	89th (1965–1967)	Ross Bass (D)
Albert Gore Sr. (D)	90th (1967–1969)	Howard Baker (R)
Albert Gore Sr. (D)	91st (1969–1971)	Howard Baker (R)
Bill Brock (R)	92nd (1971–1973)	Howard Baker (R)
Bill Brock (R)	93rd (1973–1975)	Howard Baker (R)
Bill Brock (R)	94th (1975–1977)	Howard Baker (R)
Jim Sasser (D)	95th (1977–1979)	Howard Baker (R)
Jim Sasser (D)	96th (1979–1981)	Howard Baker (R)
Jim Sasser (D)	97th (1981–1983)	Howard Baker (R)
Jim Sasser (D)	98th (1983–1985)	Howard Baker (R)
Jim Sasser (D)	99th (1985–1987)	Al Gore (D)
Jim Sasser (D)	100th (1987–1989)	Al Gore (D)
Jim Sasser (D)	101st (1989–1991)	Al Gore (D)
Jim Sasser (D)	102nd (1991–1993)	Al Gore (D)
Jim Sasser (D)	103rd (1993–1995)	Harlan Mathews (D)
Jim Sasser (D)	103rd (1993–1995)	Fred Thompson (R)
Bill Frist (R)	104th (1995–1997)	Fred Thompson (R)
Bill Frist (R)	105th (1997–1999)	Fred Thompson (R)
Bill Frist (R)	106th (1999–2001)	Fred Thompson (R)
Bill Frist (R)	107th (2001–2003)	Fred Thompson (R)
Bill Frist (R)	108th (2003–2005)	Lamar Alexander (R)
Bill Frist (R)	109th (2005–2007)	Lamar Alexander (R)
Bob Corker (R)	110th (2007–2009)	Lamar Alexander (R)
Bob Corker (R)	111th (2009–2011)	Lamar Alexander (R)
Bob Corker (R)	112th (2011–2013)	Lamar Alexander (R)
Bob Corker (R)	113th (2013–2015)	Lamar Alexander (R)
Bob Corker (R)	114th (2015–2017)	Lamar Alexander (R)
Bob Corker (R)	115th (2017–2019)	Lamar Alexander (R)
Marsha Blackburn (R)	116th (2019–2021)	Lamar Alexander (R)
Marsha Blackburn (R)	117th (2021–2023)	Bill Hagerty (R)
Marsha Blackburn (R)	118th (2023–2025)	Bill Hagerty (R)
Marsha Blackburn (R)	119th (2025–2027)	Bill Hagerty (R)
TBA	120th (2027–2029)	Bill Hagerty (R)

== Key ==
Conservative (Con)
Democratic (D)
Democratic-Republican (DR)
Independent Democrat (ID)
Jacksonian (J)
Know Nothing (KN)
National Republican (NR)
Opposition Southern (O)
Republican (R)
Union (U)
Unconditional Union (UU)
Whig (W)

== See also ==
- List of United States congressional districts
- Tennessee's congressional districts
- Political party strength in Tennessee
