= Tom J. Murray =

American politician (1894–1971)

Thomas Jefferson Murray
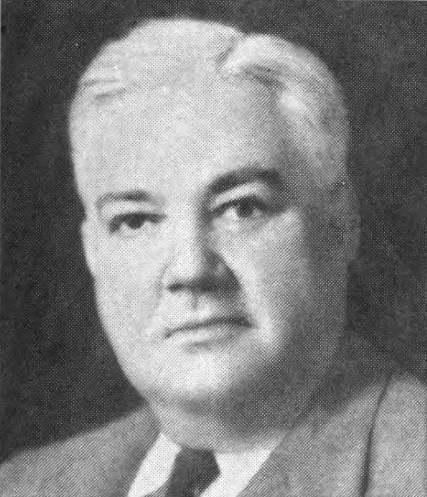

Member of the U.S. House of Representatives from Tennessee
- In office January 3, 1943 – December 30, 1966
- Preceded by: Herron C. Pearson (Redistricting)
- Succeeded by: Ray Blanton
- Constituency: 8th District (1943-1953); 7th District (1953-1966)

Personal details
- Born: August 1, 1894 Jackson, Tennessee, U.S.
- Died: November 28, 1971 (aged 77) Jackson, Tennessee, U.S.
- Party: Democratic
- Education: Union University; Cumberland School of Law
- Profession: Attorney; politician

Military service
- Allegiance: United States of America
- Branch/service: United States Army
- Years of service: 1918–1919
- Battles/wars: World War I

Thomas Jefferson Murray (August 1, 1894 – November 28, 1971), usually known as Tom J. Murray, was an American politician and a Democratic U.S. Representative from Tennessee from 1943 to 1966.

== Biography ==
Murray was born in Jackson, Tennessee, where he graduated from public and then attended Union University, from which he graduated in 1914. Murray then attended the Cumberland School of Law in Lebanon, Tennessee, graduating in 1917. He served in the United States Army during World War I but was not in any direct combat. Following his 1919 discharge, he established a private law practice in Jackson.

== Career ==
In 1923, Murray became district attorney for the former 12th Judicial District, serving in this position until 1933. In that year, he was appointed to the Solicitor's office in the former U.S. Post Office Department at its headquarters in Washington, D.C., serving there until 1942. Murray was also active in Democratic Party affairs during this time, serving on the Democratic State Executive Committee from 1923 to 1924 and as chairman of the Madison County Democratic Party from 1924 to 1933. He was a delegate to the Democratic National Conventions of 1928, 1932, and 1936.

In August 1942, Murray received the Democratic nomination for the Jackson-based 8th Congressional District, which in those days was tantamount to election in most of Tennessee. He was sworn in as a member of the 78th Congress on January 3, 1943. He was subsequently re-elected 11 times. His district was renumbered as the 7th District in 1952, after Tennessee lost a district in the 1950 census. He served as the chairman of the Post Office and Civil Service Committee from 1949 to 1953 and again from 1955 to 1966. He was a signatory to the 1956 Southern Manifesto that opposed the desegregation of public schools ordered by the Supreme Court in Brown v. Board of Education.

Early in his career, Murray was considered to be a close colleague of Memphis political "boss" E. H. Crump. However, it is apparent that Murray developed a considerable amount of clout in his own right, as he was re-elected six times after Crump's death in 1954. He ran for a 13th term in 1966, but was defeated in the Democratic primary by a future governor of Tennessee, then-State Representative Ray Blanton. Murray resigned his seat on December 30, 1966; only days before the scheduled end of his term.

== Death ==
Murray returned to Jackson after his defeat and died there less than five years later on November 28, 1971 (age 77 years, 119 days). He is buried in the city's Hollywood Cemetery.

U.S. House of Representatives
Preceded by Jere Cooper	U.S. Representative for Tennessee's 8th congressional district 1943-1953	Succeeded by Jere Cooper
Preceded by James P. Sutton	U.S. Representative for Tennessee's 7th congressional district 1953-1966	Succeeded by Ray Blanton
