= Percy Priest =

American journalist and politician from Tennessee (1900–1956)

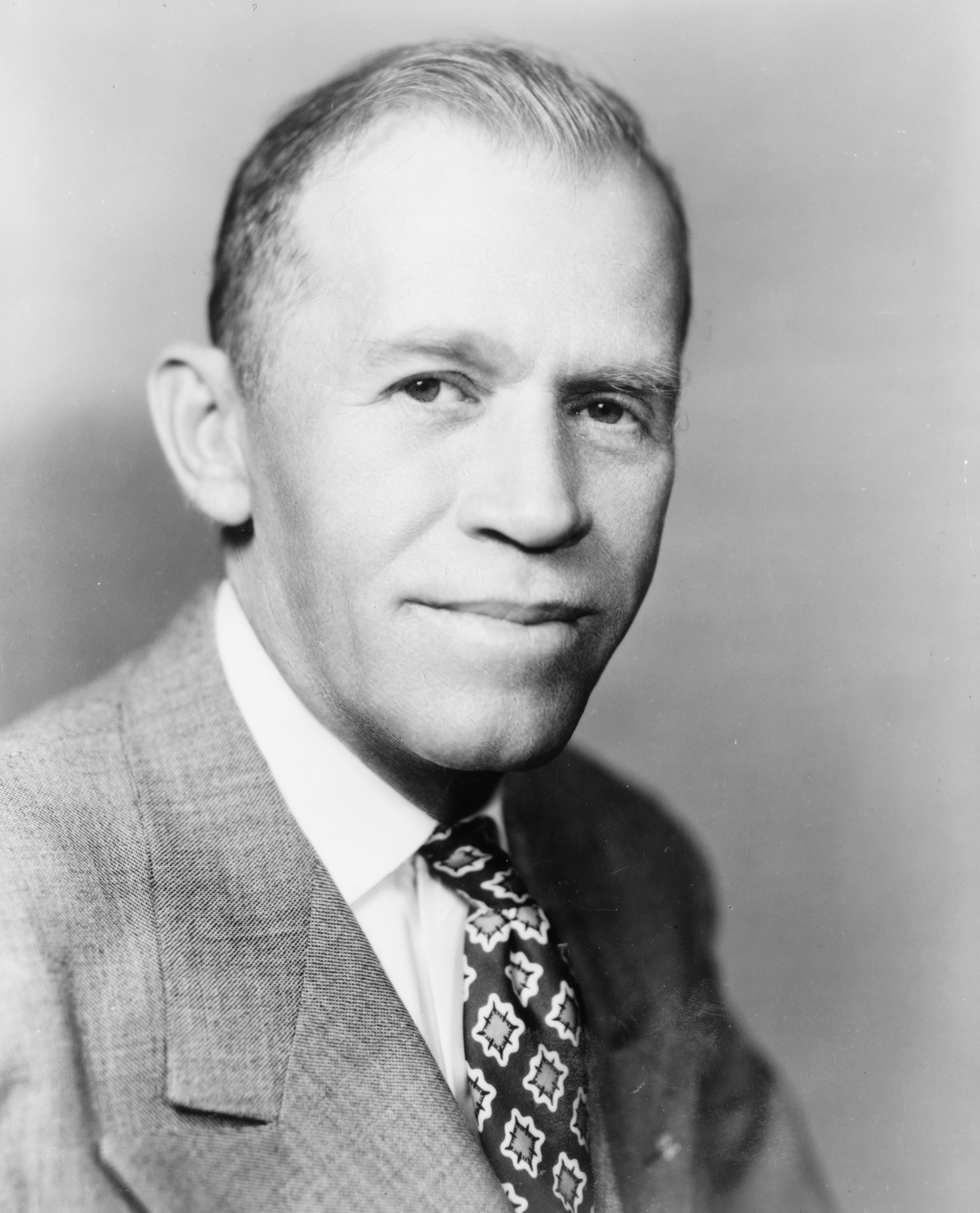

House Majority Whip
- In office January 3, 1949 – January 3, 1953
- Leader: Sam Rayburn
- Preceded by: John W. McCormack
- Succeeded by: John W. McCormack

Member of the U.S. House of Representatives from Tennessee
- In office January 3, 1941 – October 12, 1956
- Preceded by: Jo Byrns Jr.
- Succeeded by: J. Carlton Loser
- Constituency: 5th district (1941–1943); 6th district (1943–1953); 5th district (1953–1956)

Personal details
- Born: James Percy Priest; April 1, 1900 Carters Creek, Maury County, Tennessee, U.S.
- Died: October 12, 1956 (aged 56) Nashville, Tennessee, U.S.
- Party: Independent Democrat (1940); Democratic (from 1941)
- Spouse: Mildred Webster Noland (m. 1947)
- Children: Harriet Frances Priest
- Parents: George Priest (father); Harriet Hastings (mother)
- Education: State Teachers' College; Peabody College; University of Tennessee
- Occupation: Teacher; newspaper editor; politician
- Nickname: J. Percy Priest

James Percy Priest (April 1, 1900 – October 12, 1956) was an American teacher, journalist and politician who represented Tennessee in the United States House of Representatives from 1941 until his death.

== Background ==
Priest was born in Carters Creek, Maury County, Tennessee, the son of George and Harriet (née Hastings) Priest. He attended Central High School in Columbia, and afterward continued his education at State Teachers' College in Murfreesboro (now Middle Tennessee State University), Peabody College in Nashville, and the University of Tennessee. He taught school in Culleoka, in his native Maury County, from 1920 until 1926, when he joined the editorial staff of the Nashville Tennessean. In 1937, he began courting Mildred Webster Noland, whom he would marry in 1947. They had one daughter, Harriet.

== Congress ==
In 1940, Priest was encouraged to run for the United States House of Representatives as an independent in Tennessee's 5th congressional district, which is based in Nashville. He won in an upset, running as an Independent, defeating the incumbent, one-term Democratic Congressman Jo Byrns Jr. Upon swearing-in, he immediately joined the Democratic caucus, and was reelected seven times. The district was renumbered the 6th District in 1943 and became the 5th once again in 1953. He served as the House majority whip between 1949 and 1953. Priest was the only Democrat in the Tennessee House delegation who did not sign the 1956 Southern Manifesto.

At the time of his death, Priest was serving as the chairman of the House Commerce Committee and had already secured the Democratic nomination for a ninth term, which had essentially assured him of reelection since no Republican has been elected to the U.S. House of Representatives from Nashville since Reconstruction.

== Death and legacy ==
In early October 1956, Priest entered a Nashville hospital for an operation on an ulcer and was reported in satisfactory condition. However, complications developed and he died in the early morning hours of October 12.

Priest was interred at Woodlawn Cemetery in Nashville. J. Percy Priest Dam, a United States Army Corps of Engineers hydroelectric and flood control structure just east of Nashville on the Stones River (and easily visible from Interstate 40) is named in his honor, as is Percy Priest Lake (created by the dam) and an elementary school in Forest Hills, a suburb of Nashville.

In August 2010, it was announced that Priest's papers, along with the research files of Rebecca Stubbs, author of the biography J. Percy Priest and His Amazing Race, had been donated to the Tennessee State Library and Archives.

== See also ==
- List of members of the United States Congress who died in office (1950–1999)

U.S. House of Representatives
Preceded by Joseph W. Byrns Jr.	Member of the U.S. House of Representatives from Tennessee's 5th congressional district 1941–1943	Succeeded by Jim N. McCord
Preceded by W. Wirt Courtney	Member of the U.S. House of Representatives from Tennessee's 6th congressional district 1943–1953	Succeeded by James Patrick Sutton
Preceded by Joseph L. Evins	Member of the U.S. House of Representatives from Tennessee's 5th congressional district 1953–1956	Succeeded by J. Carlton Loser
Party political offices
Preceded by Leslie Cornelius Arends (R-IL)	House Majority Whip; 1949–1953	Succeeded by Leslie Cornelius Arends (R-IL)
Preceded by John William McCormack (MA)	House Democratic Whip; 1949–1953	Succeeded by John William McCormack (MA)
