= Washington C. Whitthorne =

American politician (1825–1891)

Washington Curran Whitthorne
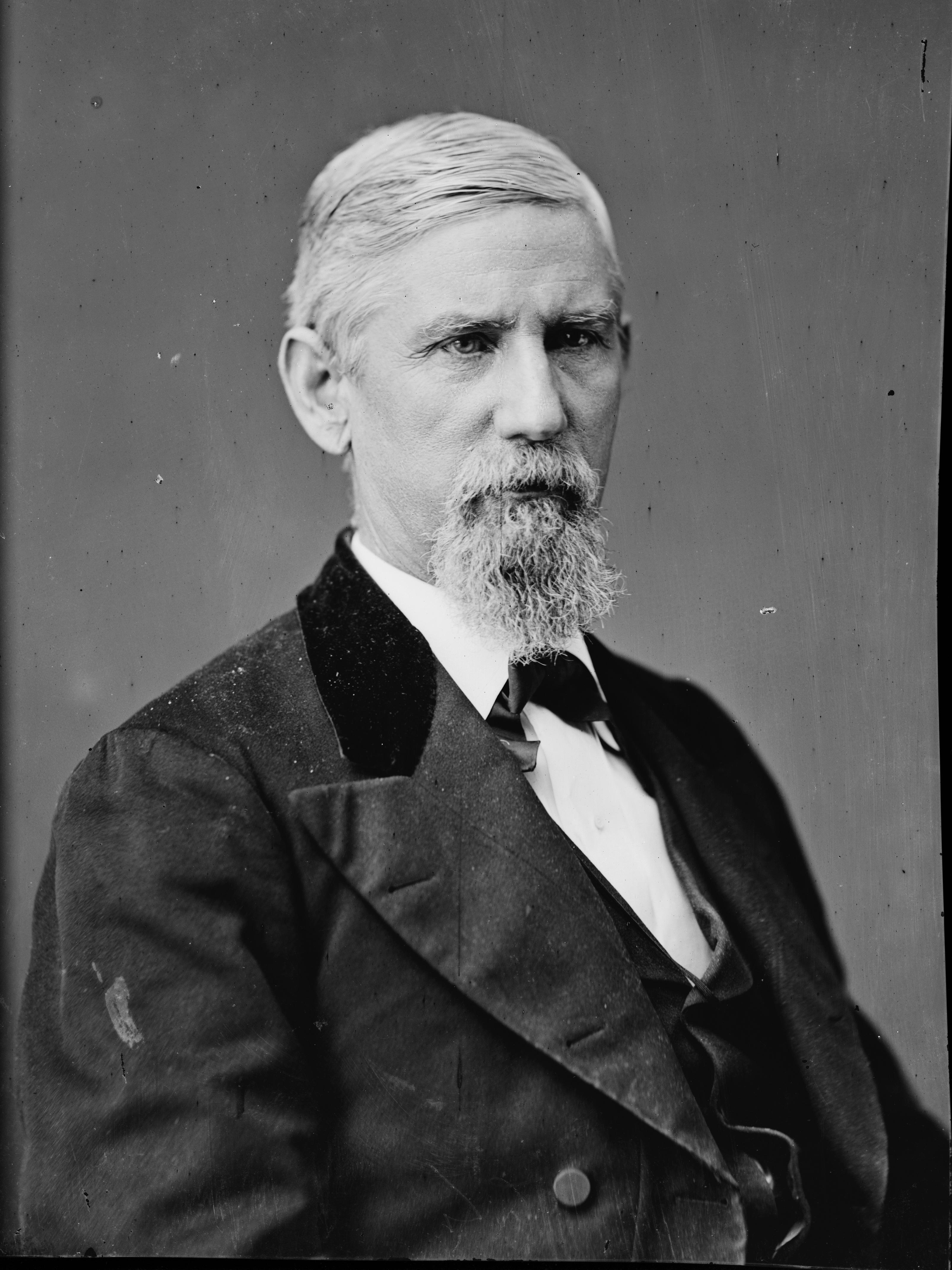

United States Senator from Tennessee
- In office April 16, 1886 – March 3, 1887
- Appointed by: William B. Bate
- Preceded by: Howell E. Jackson
- Succeeded by: William B. Bate

Member of the U.S. House of Representatives from Tennessee
- In office March 4, 1887 – March 3, 1891
- Preceded by: John Goff Ballentine
- Succeeded by: Nicholas N. Cox
- Constituency: 7th district
- In office March 4, 1871 – March 3, 1883
- Preceded by: Samuel Mayes Arnell
- Succeeded by: John Goff Ballentine
- Constituency: 6th district (1871–1875); 7th district (1875–1883)

Member of the Tennessee House of Representatives
- In office 1859-1861

Member of the Tennessee Senate
- In office 1855-1858

Personal details
- Born: April 19, 1825 Marshall County, Tennessee, U.S.
- Died: September 21, 1891 (aged 66) Columbia, Tennessee, U.S.
- Party: Democratic

Military service
- Allegiance: Confederate States of America
- Branch/service: Confederate States Army
- Rank: Adjutant General

Washington Curran Whitthorne (April 19, 1825 – September 21, 1891) was a Tennessee attorney, Democratic politician, and an adjutant general in the Confederate Army.

== Early life and career ==
Whitthorne was born near Petersburg, Tennessee in Marshall County. One day when Whitthorne was young James K. Polk stayed at his family's home. Polk saw how bright he was and asked, "What are you going to make of this boy?" His father replied "I am going to make him the President of the United States." Polk then told them to send the boy to Columbia and he would make him a lawyer. He attended Campbell Academy in Lebanon, Tennessee and subsequently East Tennessee College (now the University of Tennessee) where he graduated in 1843. He subsequently studied law and was admitted to the bar in 1845, serving in various governmental positions, and working for James K. Polk until he entered private practice in 1848 in Columbia, Tennessee. He owned slaves. On July 4, 1848, Whitthorne married Matilda Jane Campbell, a cousin of Polk.

He was elected to serve in the Tennessee State Senate from 1855 to 1858. Whitthorne was then elected Speaker of the Tennessee House of Representatives from 1859 to 1861.

== Civil War service ==
In 1861 he became Adjutant General of Tennessee for the Confederacy, and served in that post through the end of the Civil War. He also served on the staff of generals Robert Anderson, Marcus Joseph Wright, Samuel P. Carter, and William J. Hardee.

== Postbellum career ==
After Lee had surrendered at Appomattox, Whitthorne was held as prisoner of war at Columbia in order to be shielded from Federal prosecution. President Andrew Johnson interceded, gave him a Presidential pardon, and restored his civil rights. In 1870, Whitthorne began a campaign for the United States House of Representatives. He won the election and would eventually serve six consecutive terms during his initial service in the House of Representatives, chairing the House Committee on Naval Affairs from 1875 to 1881.

Upon the resignation of Senator Howell E. Jackson, Whitthorne was appointed to the U.S. Senate by governor of Tennessee William B. Bate and then subsequently elected to the balance of the term by the Tennessee General Assembly, serving in the Senate from April 16, 1886, to March 3, 1887. Following his Senate service he served two more subsequent consecutive terms in the United States House of Representatives, from 1887 to 1891. After serving in the House of Representatives Whitthorne returned to Columbia and died there later in 1891, being interred at Rose Hill Cemetery. Whitthorne Middle School in Columbia, formerly Whitthorne Junior High School, is named in his honor.

== See also ==
U.S. House of Representatives
Preceded by Samuel Mayes Arnell	U.S. Representative for Tennessee's 6th congressional district 1871–1875	Succeeded by John Ford House
Preceded by John DeWitt Clinton Atkins	U.S. Representative for Tennessee's 7th congressional district 1875–1883	Succeeded by John Goff Ballentine
Preceded by John Ballentine	U.S. Representative for Tennessee's 7th congressional district 1887–1891	Succeeded by Nicholas N. Cox
U.S. Senate
Preceded by Howell E. Jackson	U.S. senator (Class 1) from Tennessee; 1886–1887; Served alongside: Isham G. Harris	Succeeded by William B. Bate
