= Carters Creek =

Stream in Maury and Williamson counties, Tennessee, United States

Coordinates: 35.6770145°N 87.0102822°W

Carters Creek is a stream in Maury and Williamson counties, Tennessee, in the United States. It is a tributary to Rutherford Creek.

Carters Creek was named for Capt. Benjamin Carter, a 19th-century pioneer. There was a Civil War engagement there on Monday, April 27, 1863, in which 128 rebels were captured by Union Cavalry.

== See also ==
- List of rivers of Tennessee
