= Herron C. Pearson =

American politician (1890–1953)

Herron Carney Pearson
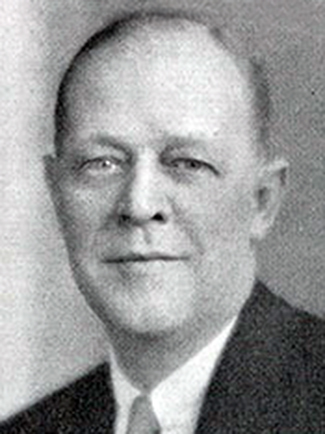

Member of the U.S. House of Representatives from Tennessee's 7th district
- In office January 3, 1935 – January 3, 1943
- Preceded by: Gordon Browning
- Succeeded by: Tom J. Murray (Redistricting)

Personal details
- Born: July 31, 1890 Taylor, Texas, U.S.
- Died: April 24, 1953 (aged 62) Jackson, Tennessee, U.S.
- Citizenship: United States
- Party: Democratic
- Spouse: Evelyn Pearcy Pearson
- Education: Union University Cumberland School of Law
- Profession: Attorney; politician; judge

Herron Carney Pearson (July 31, 1890 – April 24, 1953) was an American politician and a U.S. Representative from Tennessee.

== Biography ==
Born in Taylor, Texas, Pearson was son of John Lafayette and Annie (Herron) Pearson. He moved to Jackson, Tennessee, in 1891, attended the public and high schools, and graduated from Union University, Jackson, Tennessee, in 1910 and from Cumberland School of Law at Cumberland University, Lebanon, Tennessee, in 1912. He was admitted to the bar the same year and commenced practice in Jackson, Tennessee.

== Career ==
Pearson served as municipal judge of the city of Jackson, Tennessee, in 1915, and as City attorney of Jackson, Tennessee from 1920 to 1923. He married Evelyn Pearcy on June 23, 1915.

Elected as a Democrat to the Seventy-fourth and to the three succeeding Congresses Pearson served from January 3, 1935 to January 3, 1943. Not a candidate for renomination in 1942, he resumed the practice of law.

== Death ==
Pearson died in Jackson, Madison County, Tennessee, on April 24, 1953 (age 62 years, 267 days). He is interred at Hollywood Cemetery, Jackson, Tennessee.

U.S. House of Representatives
Preceded by Gordon Browning	Member of the U.S. House of Representatives from Tennessee's 7th congressional district 1935-1943	Succeeded by W. Wirt Courtney
