= Samuel Mayes Arnell =

American politician (1833–1903)

Member of the United States House of Representatives from Tennessee's 6th district
- In office 24 July 1866 – 3 March 1871
- Preceded by: James H. Thomas
- Succeeded by: Washington C. Whitthorne

Tennessee House of Representatives
- In office 1865–1866

Personal details
- Born: 3 May 1833 Zion Settlement, Tennessee, U.S.
- Died: 20 July 1903 (aged 70) Johnson City, Tennessee, U.S.
- Party: Unconditional Union (1865–67); Republican (after 1867)
- Education: Amherst College
- Occupation: Attorney, postmaster, superintendent of schools

Samuel Mayes Arnell (May 3, 1833 – July 20, 1903) was an American lawyer and politician who represented the 6th congressional district of Tennessee in the United States House of Representatives. He was a staunch Unionist and Republican. He had owned slaves. He later served as school superintendent and postmaster. He wrote a memoir.

== Early life ==
He was born on May 3, 1833, at Zion Settlement, near Columbia, Tennessee, in Maury County. He attended Amherst College in Amherst, Massachusetts, studied law, was admitted to the bar, and commenced practice in Columbia. He started a leather manufacturing business in 1859. He owned slaves. During the Civil War, he supported the Union actively, suffering injury, threats to his life, and property damage from Confederate forces.

== Political offices ==
He was a member of the Tennessee state constitutional convention in 1865. He served in the Tennessee House of Representatives in 1865 and 1866, where he authored a series of bills to expand voting rights to former slaves and that attempted unsuccessfully to strip the voting rights of former Confederate soldiers and officials for periods of 5 and 15 years, respectively; however, the definitions used to expand rights to blacks are seen by some historians as also having established an early version of the "one-drop" rule in Tennessee law.

Upon the readmission of Tennessee to representation, he was elected as an Unconditional Unionist to the Thirty-ninth Congress. He was re-elected as a Republican to the Fortieth and Forty-first Congresses. He served from July 24, 1866, to March 3, 1871, but he was not a candidate for renomination in 1870. During the Forty-first Congress, he was the chairman of the Committee on Expenditures in the Department of State. He was chairman of the United States House Committee on Education and Labor during the Forty-first Congress. He also was a delegate to the Republican National Convention from Tennessee in 1868.

== Private citizen ==
He resumed the practice of law in Washington, D.C., then later returned to Columbia, Tennessee. He was the postmaster of Columbia from 1879 to 1885. He was the superintendent of public schools from 1885 to 1888. Near the end of his life, he authored his memoirs, "‘Ten Years of Tennessee History’ or ‘The War of Secession and Reconstruction in Tennessee, 1861-1871.’"

He died on July 20, 1903, in Johnson City, Tennessee, in Washington County. He was interred in Monte Visa Cemetery.

U.S. House of Representatives
Preceded by James Houston Thomas	Member of the U.S. House of Representatives from Tennessee's 6th congressional district 1866–1871	Succeeded by Washington C. Whitthorne
