= James Patrick Sutton =

American politician (1915–2005)

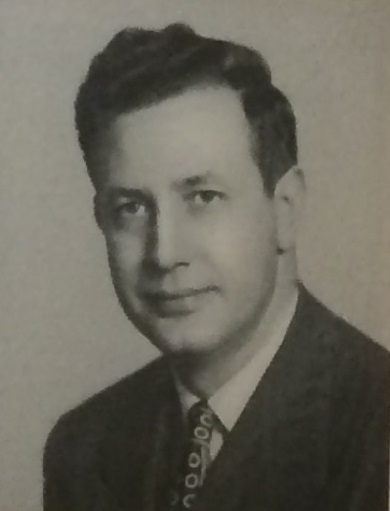
- From 1949's Pictorial Directory of the Eighty-First Congress

Member of the U.S. House of Representatives from Tennessee
- In office January 3, 1949 – January 3, 1955
- Preceded by: W. Wirt Courtney (7th); J. Percy Priest (6th)
- Succeeded by: Tom J. Murray (7th); Ross Bass (6th)
- Constituency: 7th district (1949-53); 6th district (1953-55)

Personal details
- Born: October 31, 1915
- Died: February 3, 2005 (aged 89)
- Citizenship: United States
- Party: Democratic
- Education: Cumberland University Middle Tennessee State College
- Profession: Attorney
- Awards: Distinguished Service Cross; Silver Star with oak leaf cluster; Purple Heart with two oak leaf clusters

Military service
- Allegiance: United States
- Branch/service: United States Navy
- Years of service: 1942 to 1946
- Battles/wars: World War II

James Patrick Sutton (October 31, 1915 – February 3, 2005) was an American politician and a member of the United States Congress from Tennessee.

== Biography ==
Sutton was born on October 31, 1915, near Wartrace, Bedford County, Tennessee. He attended the public schools of Wartrace, Tennessee, and Cumberland University in Lebanon, Tennessee. He graduated from Middle Tennessee State College in Murfreesboro, Tennessee in 1939.

== Career ==
During World War II, Sutton served in the United States Navy from 1942 to 1946. He was awarded the Distinguished Service Cross, the Silver Star with oak leaf cluster, and the Purple Heart with two oak leaf clusters. On 3 February 1945, during a World War II battle to re-take the Philippines from the Japanese, elements of the U.S. Army's 1st Cavalry Division pushed into the northern outskirts of Manila, with only the steep-sided Tuliahan River separating them from the city proper. A squadron of the 8th Cavalry Regiment reached the bridge just moments after Japanese soldiers had finished preparing it for demolition. As the two sides opened fire on one another, the Japanese lit the fuse leading to the carefully placed explosives. Without hesitation, Lt. Sutton, a Navy demolitions expert attached to the division, dashed through the enemy fire and cut the burning fuse. This heroic act allowed the soldiers of the 1st Cavalry Division to cross the bridge and seize Manila.

Sutton was elected as a Democrat to the Eighty-first and to the two succeeding Congresses. He served from January 3, 1949 until January 3, 1955. In 1954, he was an unsuccessful candidate for United States Senator.

Subsequently, Sutton served as the county sheriff for Lawrence County, Tennessee.

In 1963, he and his brother were indicted by a federal grand jury for counterfeiting. He pleaded guilty in 1964 and was sentenced to one year in prison, and two years probation. He served an additional 10 months in federal prison in 1965 after violating his probation. He later worked as an investment broker, and spent time restoring antiques.

== Death ==
Sutton died in the Lakeland Specialty Hospital, Berrien Center, Berrien County, Michigan, on February 3, 2005 (age 89 years, 95 days). He was cremated, and his ashes are interred at Arlington National Cemetery, Arlington, Virginia.

U.S. House of Representatives
Preceded by W. Wirt Courtney	Member of the U.S. House of Representatives from Tennessee's 7th congressional district 1949–1953	Succeeded by Tom J. Murray
Preceded by J. Percy Priest	Member of the U.S. House of Representatives from Tennessee's 6th congressional district 1953–1955	Succeeded by Ross Bass
