= Fats Everett =

American politician (1915–1969)

Robert Ashton "Fats" Everett
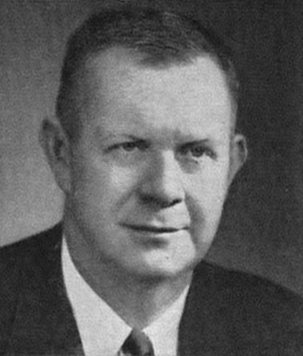

Member of the U.S. House of Representatives from Tennessee's 8th district
- In office February 1, 1958 – January 26, 1969
- Preceded by: Jere Cooper
- Succeeded by: Ed Jones

Personal details
- Born: February 24, 1915 Obion County, Tennessee, U.S.
- Died: January 26, 1969 (aged 53) Nashville, Tennessee, U.S.
- Party: Democratic
- Education: Murray State University
- Profession: Attorney

Military service
- Allegiance: United States
- Branch/service: United States Army
- Years of service: 1942–1945
- Battles/wars: World War II

Robert Ashton "Fats" Everett (February 24, 1915 – January 26, 1969) was an American Democratic congressman from Tennessee from February 1, 1958, until his death in 1969.

== Biography ==
Everett was a native of Obion County, Tennessee, being born on a farm near Union City. He was a 1936 graduate of Murray State College (now Murray State University), in Murray, Kentucky.

== Career ==
Elected to the Obion County Court (now called County Commission) in 1936, Everett was then elected, in 1938 as Obion County Circuit Court Clerk. During World War II, he served in the United States Army from 1942 to 1945. After the war he was an administrative assistant to Senator Tom Stewart from 1945 to 1949, and to Governor Gordon Browning from 1950 to 1952. Afterwards, he became executive secretary of the Tennessee County Services Association.

In 1958, Everett entered the contest for the Eighth Congressional District seat of Jere Cooper, who had died in office. He won the special election and served the balance of Cooper's term and five subsequent terms, serving from February 1, 1958, until his death in the first month of his seventh term. For most of his Congressional career, Everett had a liberal voting record.

== Death ==
Everett died of pneumonia and flu complications at Veterans Hospital in Nashville, Tennessee on January 26, 1969. He is interred at East View Cemetery in Union City. There is a statue of him at the Obion County Courthouse in Union City, Tennessee.

== See also ==
- List of members of the United States Congress who died in office (1950–1999)

U.S. House of Representatives
Preceded by Jere Cooper	Member of the U.S. House of Representatives from Tennessee's 8th congressional district 1958-1969	Succeeded by Ed Jones
