= Nicholas N. Cox =

American politician (1837–1912)

Nicholas Nichols Cox
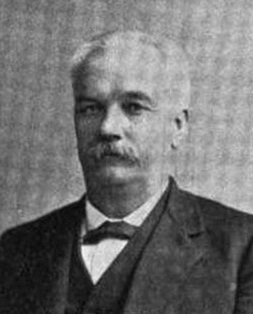

Member of the U.S. House of Representatives from Tennessee's 7th district
- In office March 4, 1891 – March 3, 1901
- Preceded by: Washington C. Whitthorne
- Succeeded by: Lemuel P. Padgett

Personal details
- Born: January 6, 1837 Bedford County, Tennessee, U.S.
- Died: May 2, 1912 (aged 75) Franklin, Tennessee, U.S.
- Party: Democratic
- Spouse: Mary Slayden Cox
- Education: Lebanon Law School
- Profession: Attorney; politician; farmer; banker

Military service
- Allegiance: Confederate States of America
- Branch/service: Confederate States Army
- Rank: Colonel
- Unit: Tenth Tennessee Cavalry
- Battles/wars: American Civil War

Nicholas Nichols Cox (January 6, 1837 – May 2, 1912) was an American politician and a member of the United States House of Representatives for the Tennessee's 7th congressional district.

== Biography ==
Cox was born in Bedford County, Tennessee on January 6, 1837, the son of Caleb and Nancy Cox. He went to Seguin, Texas as a child, attended the common schools, served on the Mexican frontier, and graduated with a law degree from Cumberland University in 1858. He was admitted to the bar the same year and commenced practice at Linden, Tennessee. He was married on January 6, 1859, to Mary Slayden, daughter of Thomas Boyd and Jane (Lewis) Slayden, and had five children, with three boys and three girls, four surviving his death.

== Career ==
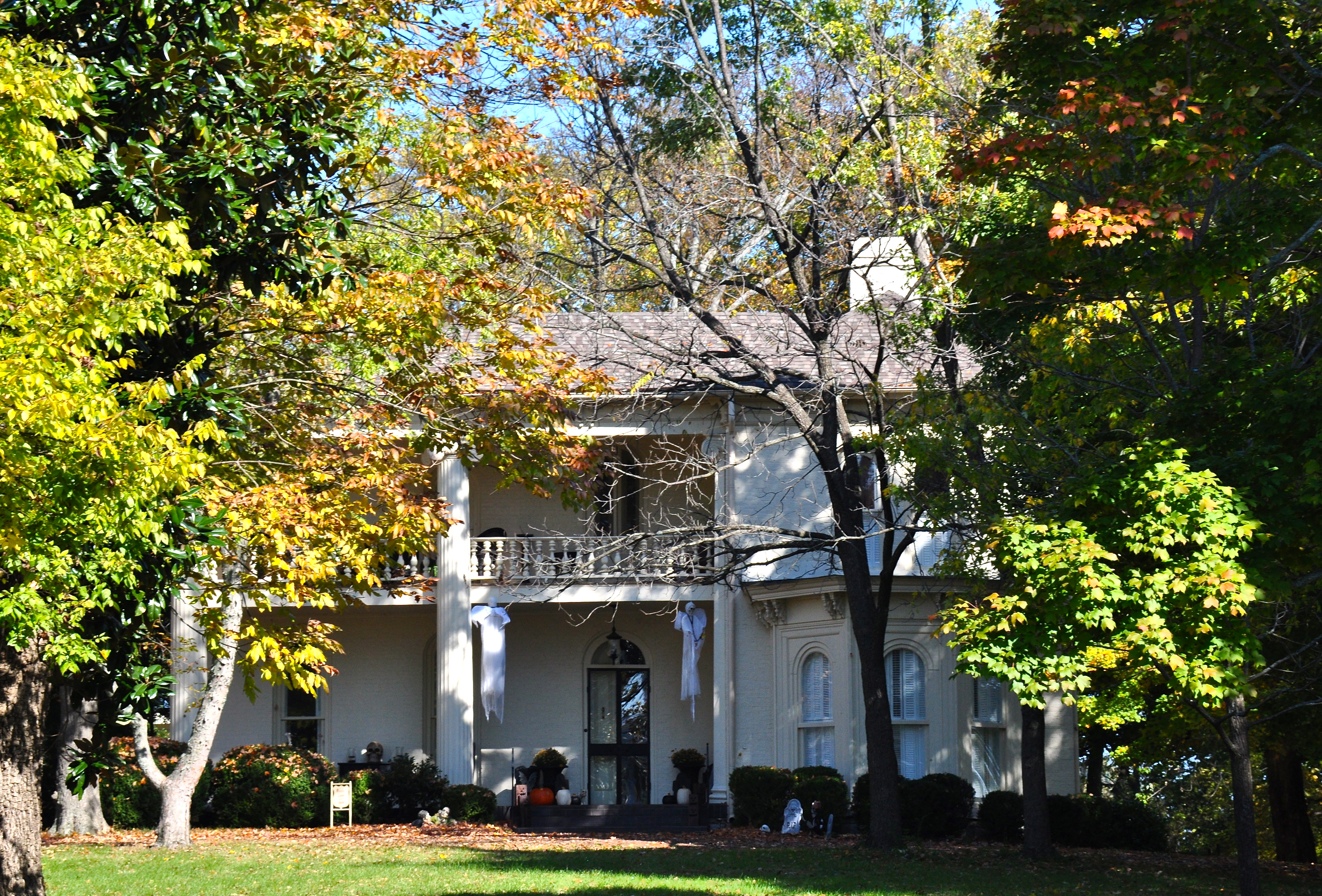
The Owen-Cox House in Brentwood, Tennessee.

During the Civil War Cox was a colonel in the Tenth Tennessee Cavalry of the Confederate Army, serving principally with General Forrest. He settled in Williamson County, Tennessee in 1866 and engaged in agricultural pursuits. In 1860, he was a presidential elector on the Democratic ticket of Breckinridge and Lane.

Cox was elected as a Democrat to the Fifty-second and the four succeeding Congresses. He served from March 4, 1891 to March 3, 1901. He declined to be a candidate for renomination in 1900. He resumed the practice of law and engaged in the practice of banking in Franklin, Tennessee.

== Death ==
Cox died in Franklin, Tennessee on May 2, 1912 (age 75 years, 117 days). He is interred at Mount Hope Cemetery. His home in Brentwood (a suburb of Nashville), the Owen-Cox House, was add to the U.S. National Register of Historic Places in 1988. It is also known as Maplelawn.

U.S. House of Representatives
Preceded by Washington C. Whitthorne	Member of the U.S. House of Representatives from Tennessee's 7th congressional district 1891-1901	Succeeded by Lemuel P. Padgett
