= Lemuel P. Padgett =

American politician (1855–1922)

Lemuel Phillips Padgett
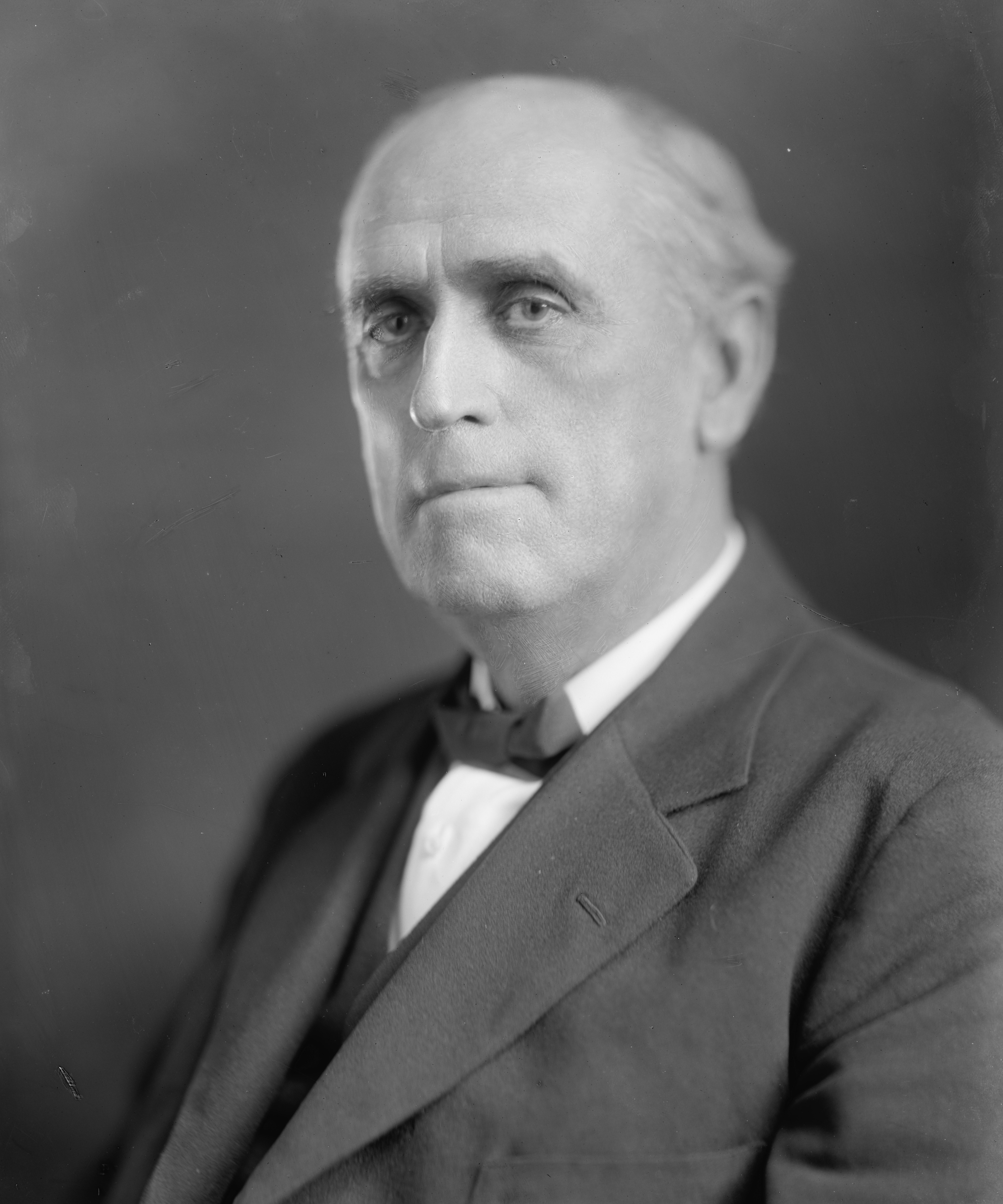

Member of the U.S. House of Representatives from Tennessee's 7th district
- In office March 4, 1901 – August 2, 1922
- Preceded by: Nicholas N. Cox
- Succeeded by: Clarence W. Turner

Member of the Tennessee Senate
- In office 1899–1901

Personal details
- Born: November 28, 1855 Columbia, Tennessee, U.S.
- Died: August 2, 1922 (aged 66) Washington, D.C., U.S.
- Citizenship: United States
- Party: Democratic
- Spouse: Ida B. Latta Padgett
- Education: Erskine College
- Profession: Attorney; politician

Lemuel Phillips Padgett (November 28, 1855 – August 2, 1922) was an American politician and a member of the United States House of Representatives for the 7th congressional district of Tennessee.

== Biography ==
Born in Columbia, Tennessee, in Maury County, Padgett was the son of John B. and Rebecca Ophelia (Phillips) Padgett. He attended the private schools in that county and graduated from Erskine College at Due West, South Carolina, in 1876. Having begun the study of law in September 1876, he was admitted to the bar in March 1877.

== Career ==
Padgett began to practice law in Columbia, Tennessee, in January 1879 and he married Ida B. Latta on November 11, 1880. He was a Presidential Elector for Tennessee, 1884, and a member of the Tennessee Senate from 1899 to 1901.

Elected as a Democrat to the Fifty-seventh and the ten succeeding Congresses, Padgett served from March 4, 1901, until his death. During the Sixty-second through Sixty-fifth Congresses, he was the chairman of the United States House Committee on Naval Affairs. A thorough and studious man, he took his job seriously. He became like a walking encyclopedia about all things naval.

== Death ==
Padgett died in Washington, D.C., on August 2, 1922. He is interred at Rose Hill Cemetery in Columbia, Tennessee.

== See also ==
- Politics of the United States
- List of members of the United States Congress who died in office (1900–1949)

U.S. House of Representatives
| Preceded by Nicholas N. Cox | Member of the U.S. House of Representatives from Tennessee's 7th congressional district 1901-1922 | Succeeded by Vacant |
