= Ed Jones (Tennessee politician) =

American politician (1912–1999)

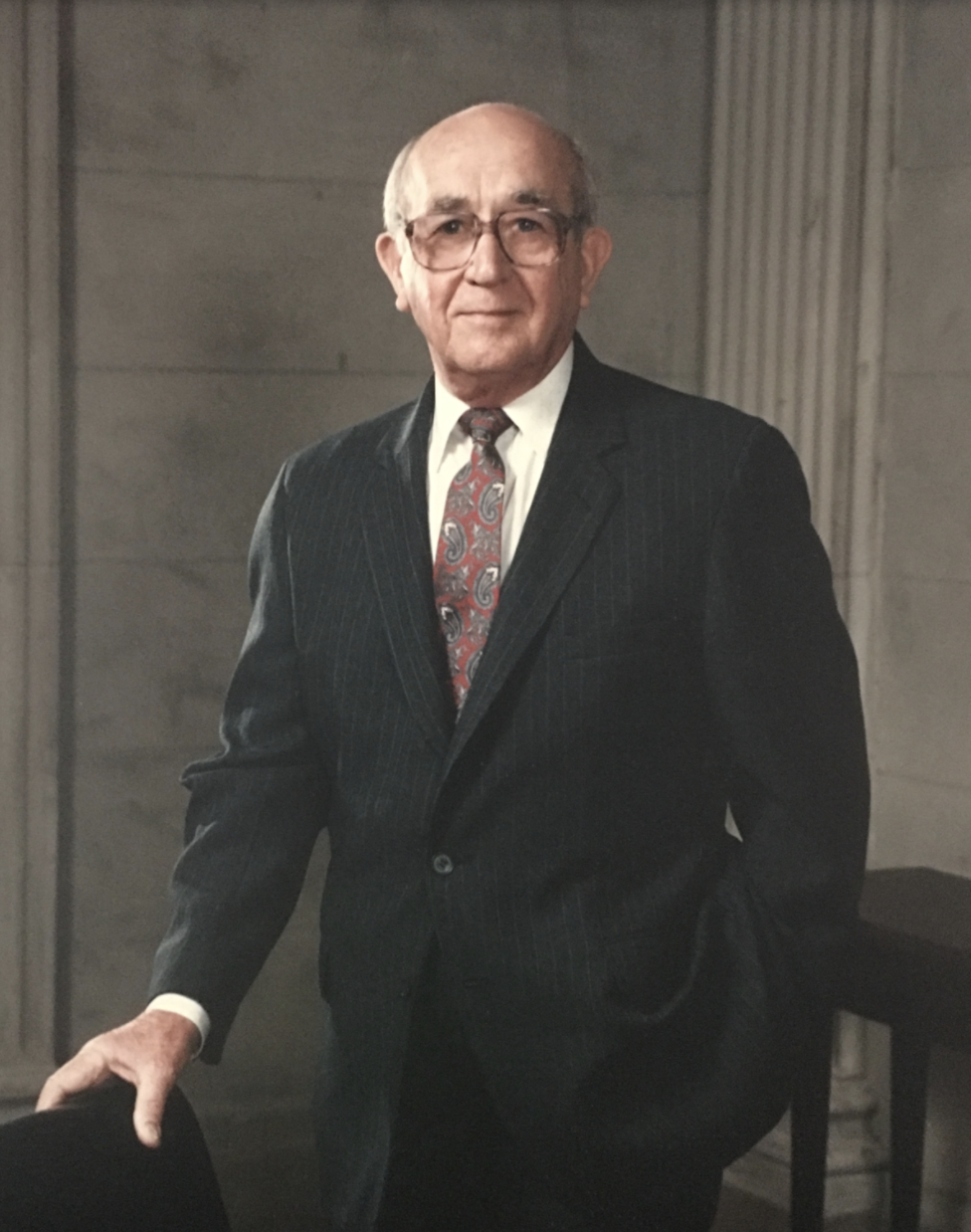

Member of the U.S. House of Representatives from Tennessee
- In office March 25, 1969 – January 3, 1989
- Preceded by: Fats Everett
- Succeeded by: John Tanner
- Constituency: 8th district (1969–1973); 7th district (1973–1983); 8th district (1983–1989)

Commissioner of Agriculture of Tennessee
- In office 1949–1952
- Governor: Gordon Browning
- Preceded by: O. E. Van Cleave
- Succeeded by: Buford Ellington

Personal details
- Born: April 20, 1912 Yorkville, Tennessee, U.S.
- Died: December 11, 1999 (aged 87) Dyer, Tennessee, U.S.
- Party: Democratic
- Spouse: Llewellyn Wyatt
- Children: Mary Llew Jones McGuire and Dr. Jennifer Jones Kinnard
- Relatives: Meg Kinnard (granddaughter)
- Education: University of Tennessee University of Tennessee at Martin
- Profession: Farmer

Ed Jones (April 20, 1912 – December 11, 1999) was a U.S. representative from the state of Tennessee from 1969 to 1989. He was also the Tennessee commissioner of agriculture from 1949 to 1953. He was inducted into the Tennessee Agricultural Hall of Fame in 2011.

== Personal life ==
Ed Jones was a native of Yorkville, Tennessee, the eldest of three boys born to Will "Gabe" Jones and Sibbie Hortense Pipkin. He graduated from the University of Tennessee Junior College (now the University of Tennessee at Martin) in 1932 and attended the University of Tennessee, majoring in agriculture. His father was a laborer who worked odd jobs for local farmers. He instilled a strong work ethic in Jones from an early age, requiring him to work after school and on Saturdays.

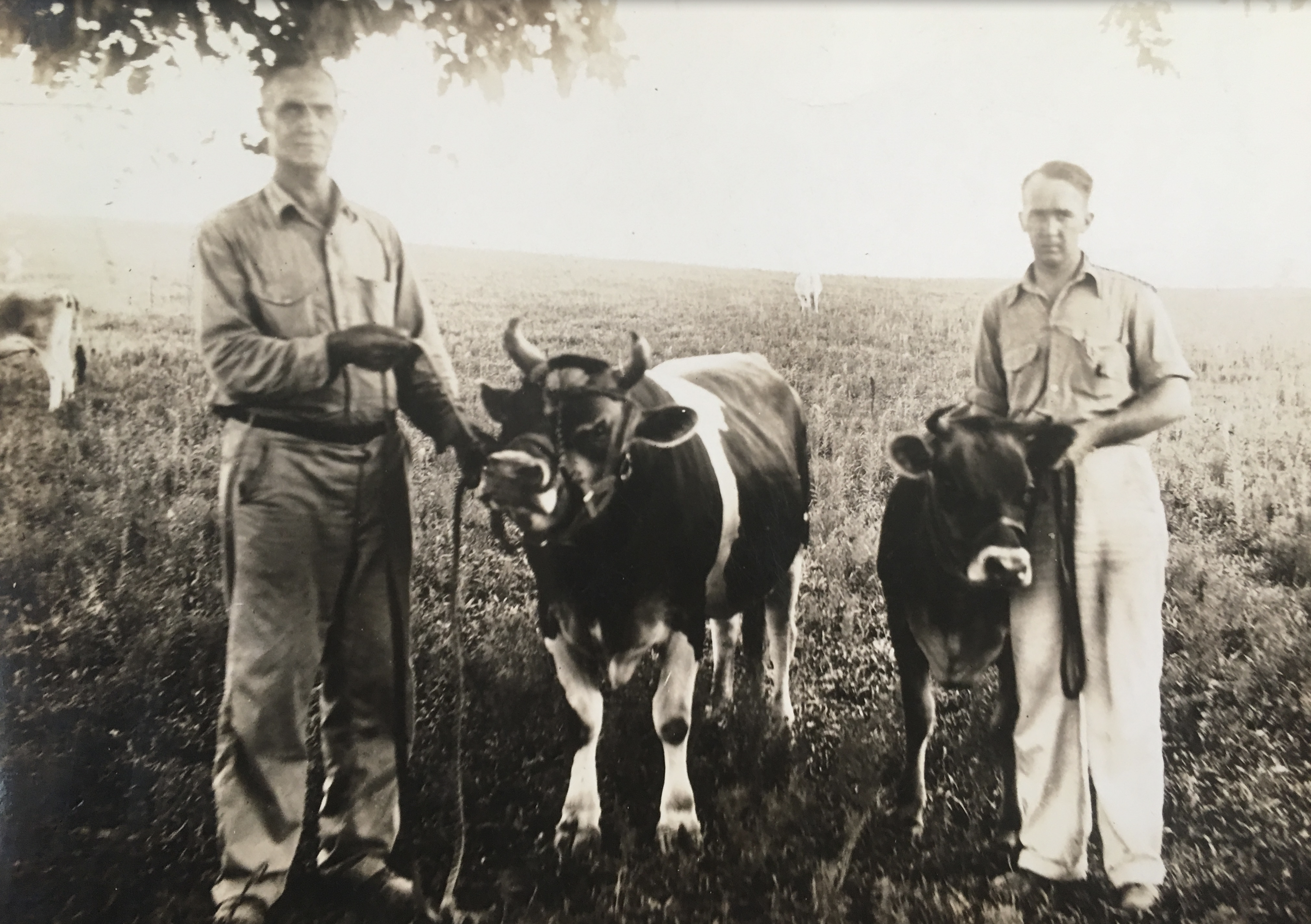
A young Ed Jones with his father

When Jones' father was unable to pay his medical bills, he began doing odd jobs for Dr. Finis Ewing Wyatt, the local country doctor. Jones would marry Dr. Wyatt's daughter, Llewellyn, in 1938, and they had two daughters: Mary Llewellyn Jones (died 1977), and Dr. Jennifer Jones Kinnard, a retired nephrologist. Ed and Llew Jones inherited the dairy farm after the death or Llew's parents and renamed it "Oak Haven Farm."

On May 22, 1980, Congresswoman Marilyn Lloyd of Tennessee welcomed Jones into the "grandparents club" with an address on the House floor shortly after the birth of his only grandchild, Meghan Elisabeth Kinnard. Known professionally as Meg Kinnard, she's a political and legal affairs reporter for The Associated Press.

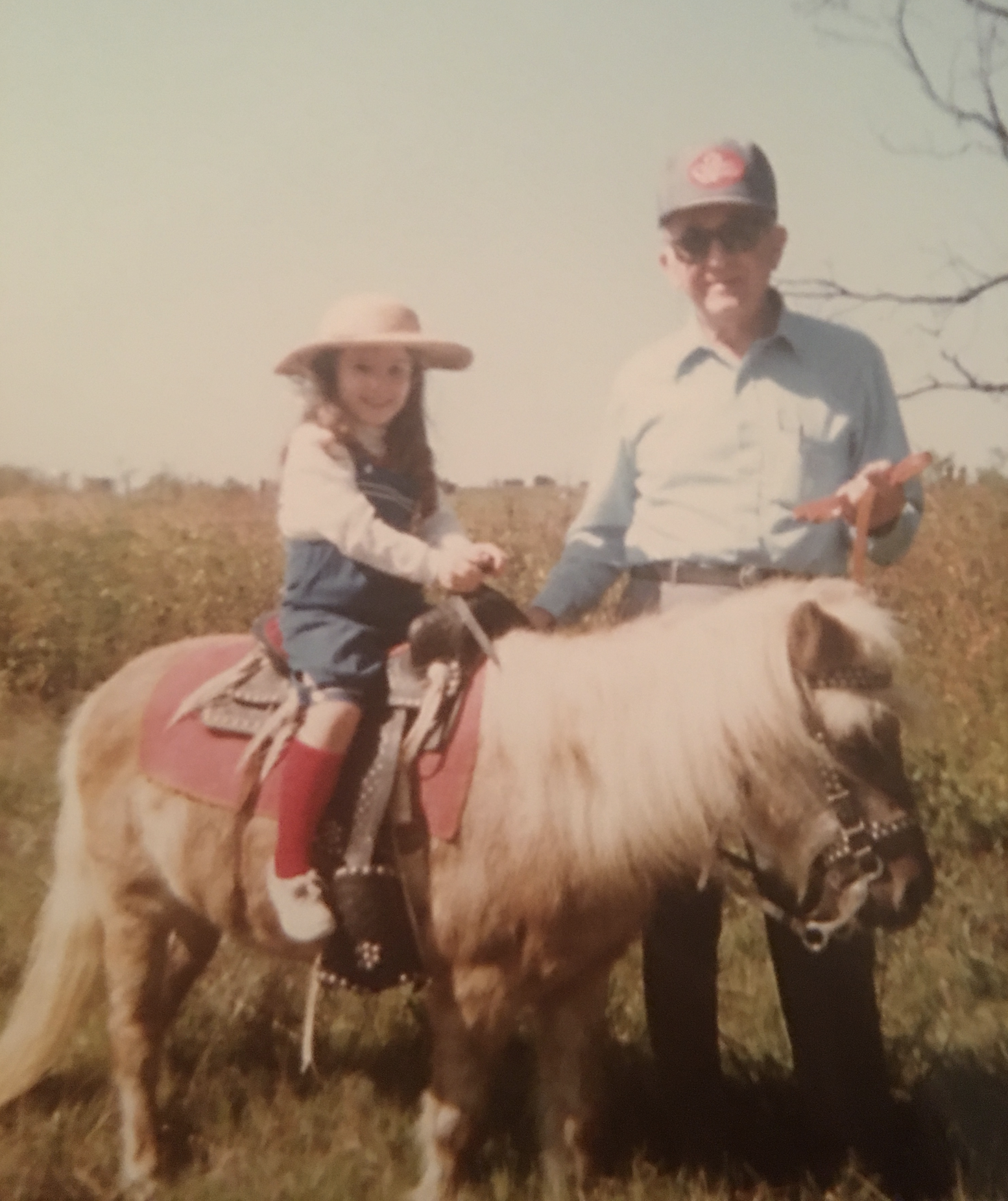
Ed Jones with granddaughter, Meghan. c. 1986

Jones was a dairy farmer and remained so throughout his lifetime – even during his 20 years in Congress. In the late 1990s, Jones developed dementia after open heart surgery, and died on December 11, 1999, in Dyer, Tennessee.

== Business and professional activities ==
In 1934, Jones took a job as a dairy inspector for the state of Tennessee. He remained as inspector until 1941 when he began working as a supervisor for the Tennessee Dairy Products Association. In 1944, he became an agricultural agent for the Illinois Central Railroad, a job he held until 1969, except for four years when he was Commissioner of Agriculture. This public role was pivotal in helping to make him a public figure in West Tennessee.

He was appointed Commissioner of Agriculture of Tennessee in 1949 by Governor Gordon Browning. He is the youngest person to serve as Commissioner. His education, public role, and business experience provided a foundation for helping to guide farm policy for Tennessee during a time of rapid technological change and the social changes as many people left the rural farms. His challenges included the transition of Tennessee agriculture from small family farms to commercial business operations. He created an Assistant Commissioner position to oversee the administrative operations so that he could focus on strategic issues involving animal health vaccination and inspections, artificial insemination for breeding dairy cattle, establishment of a surplus food distribution program for schools, food safety inspections, and agricultural disaster response.

In 1961 President John F. Kennedy appointed him chairman of the Agricultural Stabilization and Conservation Service state committee for Tennessee. He held that position until his election to Congress in 1969.

== U.S. legislative service ==
In March 1969, Jones won the Democratic nomination for a special election to replace Robert "Fats" Everett, Congressman from the 8th District in Northwest Tennessee, who had died in office. The election was unusual in that it was contested not only by the Republicans but also by the American Independent Party of George Wallace, who did well in Northwest Tennessee in the previous year's presidential election. The other two candidates almost split the vote evenly in the March 25 contest; Jones won with a substantial plurality and was sworn in as soon as the results were certified. However, he was never again to face an election nearly this close. Jones was re-elected to a full term with less opposition in 1970. In 1972 his district was merged with the Jackson-based 7th District of fellow Democrat Ray Blanton. The resulting district was, if anything, even more Democratic than his previous district. While it retained Blanton's district number, geographically it was more Jones' district (it became the 8th once again after Tennessee regained a ninth district in the 1980 census). To avoid a primary election, Blanton ran, unsuccessfully, for the United States Senate against Republican Howard Baker. Jones retained his seat easily even as Richard Nixon won 90 of Tennessee's 95 counties, including most of his district. He was reelected completely unopposed in 1974.

In 1976, Martin businessman and state representative Larry Bates, an associate of high-profile East Tennessee banker Jake Butcher, ran against Jones in the Democratic primary. This was the first (and as it turned out, only) serious challenge of any sort Jones faced. No other party put up a candidate, meaning that victory in the primary was tantamount to election. Bates had a very conservative record as a state representative, even by Tennessee Democratic standards of the time. He ran well to the right of the moderate Jones and spent a large amount of money by the standards of rural West Tennessee at the time. However, he made no real inroads in Jones' support and was heavily defeated.

After this, Jones coasted to five more terms (including a completely unopposed run in 1984), choosing not to run for a 10th full term (11th overall) in 1988. The Jackson Sun reported on February 14, 1988: "Jones says he's retiring simply because the time has come. He wants to spend more time with his wife, Llew, and with his granddaughter, Meghan."

Jones co-sponsored over 100 bills that successfully entered into law during his tenure in Congress. Jones was the primary author of five bills that passed into law, all of them on agriculture. Among those bills was the Egg Research and Consumer Information Act of 1974, which lead to the creation of the American Egg Board.

== Legacy ==
He served as a member of various agriculture-related boards and committees. Jones continued to operate his farm near Yorkville until shortly before his death on December 11, 1999. He was one of the few members of Congress in the late 20th century who was an active farmer instead of merely listing it as an occupation. In 2011, he was inducted as the 13th member of the Tennessee Agricultural Hall of Fame in recognition of his service to Tennessee.

His congressional papers (1969–1988) are housed in the special collections of the Paul Meek Library at UT Martin. They include 121 linear feet of paper files organized in five series, Correspondence, Legislation, Projects, Committees, and Public Relations. The collection includes over 250 audio tapes for two periods, (1969–72) and (1987–88).

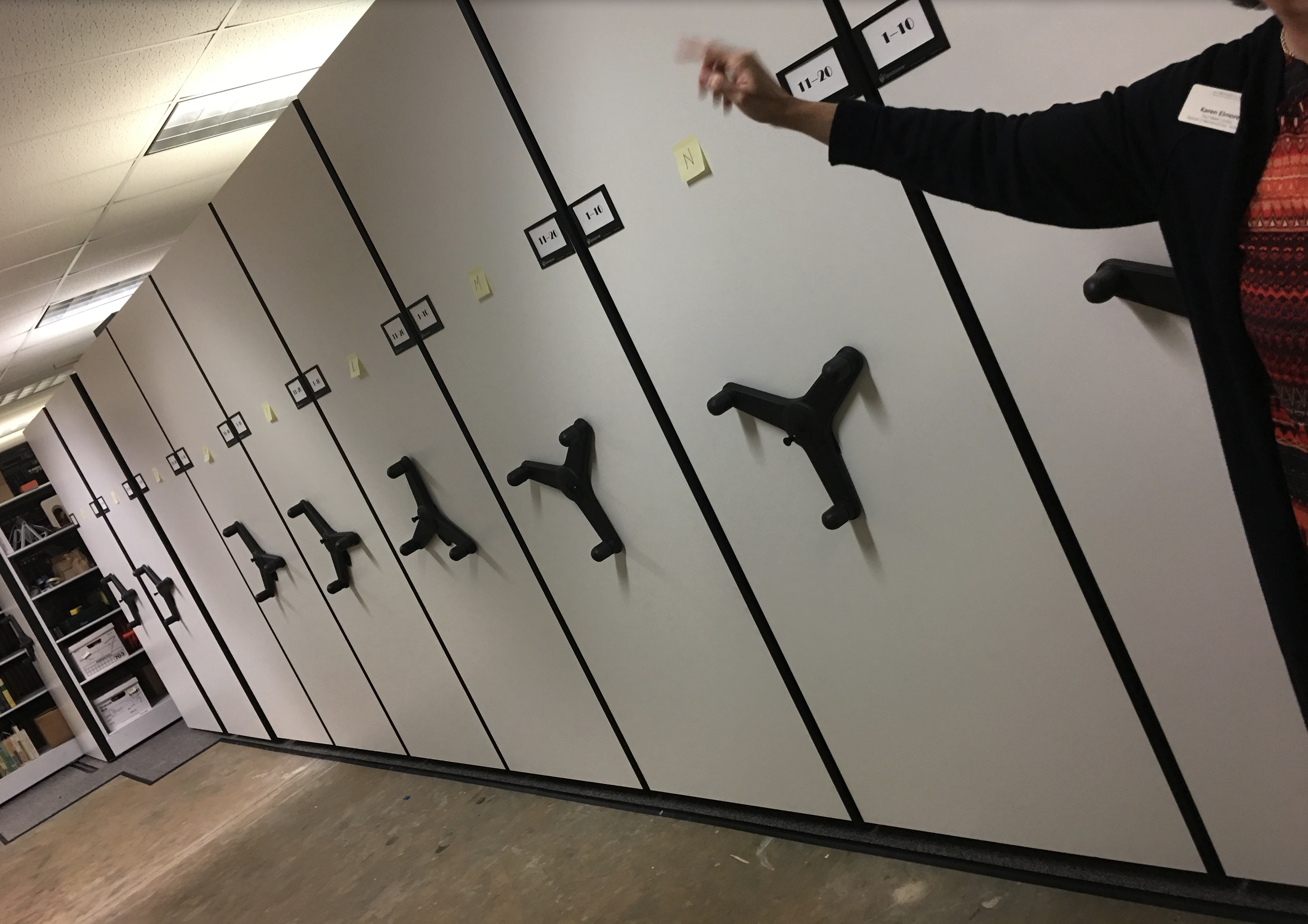
The Ed Jones Congressional Papers at the Paul Meek Library, The University of Tennessee at Martin.

U.S. House of Representatives
| Preceded by Robert A. Everett | Member of the U.S. House of Representatives from Tennessee's 8th congressional district 1969–1973 | Succeeded by Dan Kuykendall |
| Preceded by Ray Blanton | Member of the U.S. House of Representatives from Tennessee's 7th congressional district 1973–1983 | Succeeded by Don Sundquist |
| Preceded by Harold Ford, Sr. | Member of the U.S. House of Representatives from Tennessee's 8th congressional district 1983–1989 | Succeeded by John S. Tanner |
