= Jere Cooper =

American lawyer & politician (1893–1957)

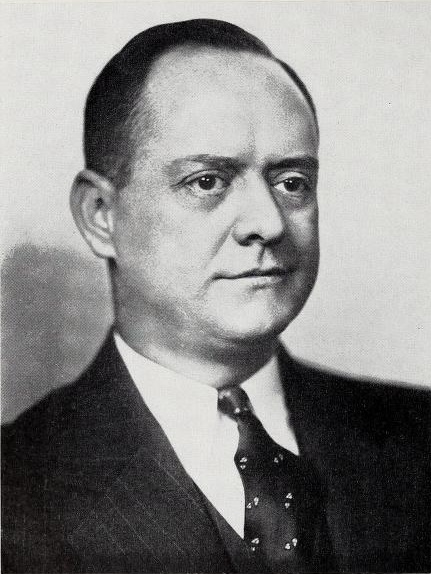

Member of the U.S. House of Representatives from Tennessee
- In office March 4, 1929 – December 18, 1957
- Preceded by: Finis J. Garrett
- Succeeded by: Fats Everett
- Constituency: 9th District (1929-1933); 8th District (1933-1943); 9th District (1943-1953); 8th District (1953-1957)

Personal details
- Born: July 20, 1893 Dyer County, Tennessee, U.S.
- Died: December 18, 1957 (aged 64) Bethesda, Maryland, U.S.
- Citizenship: United States
- Party: Democratic
- Spouse: Mary Rankley Cooper
- Children: Jere Cooper
- Education: Cumberland School of Law
- Profession: Attorney politician

Military service
- Allegiance: United States of America
- Branch/service: United States Army
- Years of service: 1917 - April 2, 1919
- Rank: First Lieutenant Captain(July 9, 1918)
- Unit: Second Tennessee Infantry, National Guard Co K, 119th Infantry, Thirtieth Division
- Battles/wars: World War I (France and Belgium)

Jere Cooper (July 20, 1893 – December 18, 1957) was a Democratic United States representative from Tennessee.

== Biography ==
Cooper was born on a farm near Dyersburg, Dyer County, Tennessee, son of Joseph W. and Viola May (Cooper) Cooper. He attended public schools and then was graduated from the Cumberland School of Law in Lebanon, Tennessee, in 1914. He was admitted to the bar in 1915 and commenced practice in Dyersburg, Tennessee. He married Mary Rankley in December 1930; the couple had one son, Leon Jere Cooper, who died as a child.

== Career ==
Upon the U.S. entry into World War I in 1917, Cooper enlisted in the Second Tennessee Infantry, National Guard, and was commissioned a first lieutenant. Later he was transferred, with his company, to Co K, 119th Infantry, Thirtieth Division, and served in France and Belgium. On July 9, 1918, he was promoted to captain and served as regimental adjutant until discharged from the army on April 2, 1919. After the war he resumed the practice of law in Dyersburg.

Cooper was a member of the city council and city attorney from 1920 to 1928, and was elected department commander of the American Legion of Tennessee in 1921.

Elected as a Democrat to the 71st, and to the fourteen succeeding, Congresses, Cooper served from March 4, 1929, until his death. He served as chairman of the U.S. House Committee on Ways and Means (84th and 85th Congresses), and on the Joint Committee on Internal Revenue Taxation (Eighty-fifth Congress).

He was a signatory to the 1956 Southern Manifesto that opposed the desegregation of public schools ordered by the Supreme Court in Brown v. Board of Education.

== Death ==
Cooper died in Bethesda, Maryland, on December 18, 1957 (age 64 years, 151 days). He is interred at Fairview Cemetery, Dyersburg, Tennessee.

== See also ==
- List of members of the United States Congress who died in office (1950–1999)

U.S. House of Representatives
| Preceded by Finis J. Garrett | Member of the U.S. House of Representatives from Tennessee's 9th congressional district 1929–1933 | Succeeded by E. H. Crump |
| Preceded by Gordon Browning | Member of the U.S. House of Representatives from Tennessee's 8th congressional district 1933–1943 | Succeeded by Tom J. Murray |
| Preceded by Clifford Davis | Member of the U.S. House of Representatives from Tennessee's 9th congressional district 1943–1953 | Succeeded by Clifford Davis |
| Preceded by Tom Murray | Member of the U.S. House of Representatives from Tennessee's 8th congressional district 1953–1957 | Succeeded by Fats Everett |
