= Tennessee's 7th congressional district =

U.S. House district for Tennessee

Coordinates: 35°38′02″N 87°49′59″W

- Interactive map of district boundaries
- Representative: Matt Van Epps; R–Nashville
- Population (2025): 843,879
- Median household income: $76,991
- Ethnicity: 69.4% White; 15.8% Black; 7.4% Hispanic; 4.5% Two or more races; 2.0% Asian; 0.8% other
- Cook PVI: R+11

The 7th congressional district of Tennessee is a congressional district located in parts of Middle and West Tennessee. It has been represented by Republican Matt Van Epps since December 4, 2025. The 7th district has significant urban, suburban, and rural areas. Although most of the area is rural, more than half of the district's votes are cast in either Davidson County (Nashville), Montgomery County (Clarksville), or Williamson County (Franklin).

By most measures, Williamson County is the wealthiest county in the state and is usually ranked near the top nationally.

The district has a very strong military presence, as it includes Tennessee's share of Fort Campbell. Politically speaking, the area was secessionist and part of the Democrats' "Solid South" for a century after the Civil War. But the Highland Rim of Wayne County was strongly Unionist during the war and voted Republican afterwards.

Starting with the election of Robin Beard from a predecessor district in 1973, conservative whites have switched from the Democratic Party to the Republican Party, and consequently this district has become one of the most Republican areas in Tennessee. Nashville's suburbs have been similar politically to those of most affluent suburban districts in much of the South until the mid-2000s. It has a strong social conservative bent; many of the state's most politically active churches are either located here or draw most of their congregations from here. Until 2013, it included Memphis' eastern suburbs and much of eastern Memphis itself, which had a similar character.

The former secessionist counties that are rural are similar demographically to the 8th district. Their voters supported Democratic candidates until the 2000s; three of the five Tennessee counties won by George McGovern in Richard Nixon's 1972 landslide lie within this district. However, since the mid-2000s, the aforementioned counties have voted overwhelmingly Republican in all elections.

Today, the only Democratic stronghold in the district is part of Nashville. This was added to the district in 2022 during the redistricting cycle. The city of Clarksville is the most competitive part of the district.

== History ==
Districts stretching from Clarksville to West Tennessee have existed in one form or another since 1871. For most of the time between 1933 and 1983 (with the exception of 1943 to 1953), the region was primarily designated as the 6th district.

This district assumed a configuration approaching its modern form in 1973, when Tennessee lost a congressional seat following the 1970 census. At that time, the 6th was redrawn to stretch from Williamson County, south of Nashville, to the eastern suburbs of Memphis, covering the rural areas in between. Republican Robin Beard represented this area from 1973 to 1983.

Following the 1980 census, Tennessee gained a congressional district, and the region was re-numbered as the 7th. It lost its eastern counties to the 4th and 6th districts. Simultaneously, most of its Black residents near Memphis were drawn into the 9th district. Following this redistricting, Beard made an unsuccessful U.S. Senate bid and was replaced by former Shelby County Republican Party chair Don Sundquist.

Sundquist served through the 1980s and the 1990 redistricting, which saw the district pick up Maury County. In 1994, Sundquist was elected Governor of Tennessee, defeating future governor Phil Bredesen. He was succeeded by Ed Bryant, who served until 2002. That year, the district was significantly altered by the Democrat-led Tennessee General Assembly to pack heavily Republican suburbs of Nashville and Memphis into a single entity. The resulting district was 200 miles (320 km) long but narrowed to only two miles (3.2 km) wide at certain points in Middle Tennessee. Following this, the area elected Brentwood-based state senator Marsha Blackburn, who served from 2003 to 2019.

Redistricting after the 2010 census made the district more compact, though it lost its share of Memphis suburbs to the 8th. In 2018, Blackburn was elected to the U.S. Senate, defeating Phil Bredesen. The district subsequently selected physician and former state senator Mark Green.

In 2022, the district was significantly altered by the Republican-led Tennessee General Assembly which made the district technically less Republican, as the state legislature split Democratic Nashville (Davidson County) among three districts. The 7th picked up a significant portion of western Nashville while losing rural counties to the 8th. Despite these changes, the district remained a Republican stronghold with a Cook PVI of R+10.

=== 2025 special election ===
In July 2025, incumbent Mark Green resigned his seat to take a position in the private sector shortly after the passage of federal budget reconciliation legislation. This triggered the first special election for the 7th district since 1883, over 140 years ago.

The election garnered national attention as a test to the second presidency of Donald Trump, with outside groups and national parties investing millions into the race. Though the district was considered to favor Republicans, the contest was somewhat competitive; Democratic nominee Aftyn Behn outperformed the 2024 presidential margin by nearly 13 points. However, Republican nominee Matt Van Epps ultimately won the seat on December 2, 2025, with 53.9% of the vote, maintaining the seat for the Republican party.

== Current boundaries ==
The district is located in both West and Middle Tennessee. It stretches as far north as the Kentucky border, as far south as the Alabama border, as far east as Franklin, and as far west as Camden. For the 118th and successive Congresses (based on redistricting following the 2020 census), it contains all or portions of the following counties and communities:

Benton County (4)

Big Sandy, Camden (part; also 8th), Eva, Holladay

Cheatham County (4)

All 4 communities

Davidson County (2)

Berry Hill, Nashville (part; also 5th and 6th)

Dickson County (6)

All 6 communities

Decatur County (3)

All 3 communities

Hickman County (4)

All 4 communities

Houston County (2)

Erin, Tennessee Ridge

Humphreys County (3)

All 3 communities

Montgomery County (1)

Clarksville

Perry County (2)

Linden, Lobelville

Robertson County (11)

All 11 communities

Stewart County (3)

All 3 communities

Wayne County (3)

All 3 communities

Williamson County (4)

Brentwood (part; also 5th), Fairview, Franklin (part; also 5th), Thompson's Station (part; also 5th)

== Recent election results from statewide races ==
=== Results under 2022 lines ===
Year	Office	Results
2008	President	McCain 50% - 48%
2012	President	Romney 55% - 45%
2016	President	Trump 56% - 39%
2018	Senate	Blackburn 50% - 49%
2018	Governor	Lee 54% - 43%
2020	President	Trump 56% - 41%
2020	Senate	Hagerty 58% - 39%
2022	Governor	Lee 60% - 38%
2024	President	Trump 60% - 38%
2024	Senate	Blackburn 60% - 38%

== List of members representing the district ==
Name	Party	Years	Cong ress	Electoral history	District location
District established March 4, 1823
Sam Houston (Nashville)	Democratic-Republican	March 4, 1823 – March 4, 1825	18th 19th	Elected in 1823. Re-elected in 1825. Retired to run for Governor of Tennessee.	
Sam Houston (Nashville)	Jacksonian	March 4, 1825 – March 4, 1827	18th 19th	Elected in 1823. Re-elected in 1825. Retired to run for Governor of Tennessee.	
John Bell (Nashville)	Jacksonian	March 4, 1827 – March 3, 1835	20th 21st 22nd 23rd 24th 25th 26th	Elected in 1827. Re-elected in 1829. Re-elected in 1831. Re-elected in 1833. Re-elected in 1835. Re-elected in 1837. Re-elected in 1839. Retired to become U.S. Secretary of War.	
John Bell (Nashville)	Anti-Jacksonian	March 4, 1835 – March 3, 1837	20th 21st 22nd 23rd 24th 25th 26th	Elected in 1827. Re-elected in 1829. Re-elected in 1831. Re-elected in 1833. Re-elected in 1835. Re-elected in 1837. Re-elected in 1839. Retired to become U.S. Secretary of War.	
John Bell (Nashville)	Whig	March 4, 1837 – March 3, 1841	20th 21st 22nd 23rd 24th 25th 26th	Elected in 1827. Re-elected in 1829. Re-elected in 1831. Re-elected in 1833. Re-elected in 1835. Re-elected in 1837. Re-elected in 1839. Retired to become U.S. Secretary of War.	
Robert L. Caruthers (Lebanon)	Whig	March 4, 1841 – March 3, 1843	27th	Elected in 1841. Retired.	
David W. Dickinson (Murfreesboro)	Whig	March 4, 1843 – March 3, 1845	28th	Elected in 1843. Retired.	
Meredith P. Gentry (Franklin)	Whig	March 4, 1845 – March 3, 1853	29th 30th 31st 32nd	Elected in 1845. Re-elected in 1847. Re-elected in 1849. Re-elected in 1851. Retired.	
Robert M. Bugg (Lynnville)	Whig	March 4, 1853 – March 3, 1855	33rd	Elected in 1853. Retired.	
John V. Wright (Purdy)	Democratic	March 4, 1855 – March 3, 1861	34th 35th 36th	Elected in 1855. Re-elected in 1857. Re-elected in 1859. Could not seek re-election, as West Tennessee seceded.	
District inactive		March 4, 1861 – July 24, 1866	37th 38th 39th	Civil War and Reconstruction	
Isaac R. Hawkins (Huntingdon)	Unionist	July 24, 1866 – March 3, 1867	39th 40th 41st	Elected in 1865. Re-elected in 1867. Re-elected in 1868. Retired.	
Isaac R. Hawkins (Huntingdon)	Republican	March 4, 1867 – March 3, 1871	39th 40th 41st	Elected in 1865. Re-elected in 1867. Re-elected in 1868. Retired.	
Robert P. Caldwell (Trenton)	Democratic	March 4, 1871 – March 3, 1873	42nd	Elected in 1870. Lost renomination.	
John Atkins (Paris)	Democratic	March 4, 1873 – March 3, 1875	43rd	Elected in 1872. Redistricted to the 8th district.	
Washington C. Whitthorne (Columbia)	Democratic	March 4, 1875 – March 3, 1883	44th 45th 46th 47th	Redistricted from the 6th district and re-elected in 1874. Re-elected in 1876. Re-elected in 1878. Re-elected in 1880. Retired.	
John G. Ballentine (Pulaski)	Democratic	March 4, 1883 – March 3, 1887	48th 49th	Elected in 1882. Re-elected in 1884. Retired.	
Washington C. Whitthorne (Columbia)	Democratic	March 4, 1887 – March 4, 1891	50th 51st	Elected in 1886. Re-elected in 1888. Retired.	
Nicholas N. Cox (Franklin)	Democratic	March 4, 1891 – March 3, 1901	52nd 53rd 54th 55th 56th	Elected in 1890. Re-elected in 1892. Re-elected in 1894. Re-elected in 1896. Re-elected in 1898. Retired.	
Lemuel P. Padgett (Columbia)	Democratic	March 4, 1901 – August 2, 1922	57th 58th 59th 60th 61st 62nd 63rd 64th 65th 66th 67th	Elected in 1900. Re-elected in 1902. Re-elected in 1904. Re-elected in 1906. Re-elected in 1908. Re-elected in 1910. Re-elected in 1912. Re-elected in 1914. Re-elected in 1916. Re-elected in 1918. Re-elected in 1920. Died.	
Vacant		August 2, 1922 – November 6, 1922	67th		
Clarence W. Turner (Waverly)	Democratic	November 7, 1922 – March 3, 1923	67th	Elected to finish Padgett's term. Retired.	
William C. Salmon (Columbia)	Democratic	March 4, 1923 – March 3, 1925	68th	Elected in 1922. Retired.	
Edward E. Eslick (Pulaski)	Democratic	March 4, 1925 – June 14, 1932	69th 70th 71st 72nd	Elected in 1924. Re-elected in 1926. Re-elected in 1928. Re-elected in 1930. Died.	
Vacant		June 14, 1932 – August 12, 1932	72nd		
Willa Eslick (Pulaski)	Democratic	August 13, 1932 – March 3, 1933	72nd	Elected to finish her husband's term. Retired.	
Gordon Browning (Huntingdon)	Democratic	March 4, 1933 – January 3, 1935	73rd	Redistricted from the 8th district and re-elected in 1932. Retired to run for U.S. Senator.	
Herron C. Pearson (Jackson)	Democratic	January 3, 1935 – January 3, 1943	74th 75th 76th 77th	Elected in 1934. Re-elected in 1936. Re-elected in 1938. Re-elected in 1940. Retired.	
W. Wirt Courtney (Franklin)	Democratic	January 3, 1943 – January 3, 1949	78th 79th 80th	Redistricted from the 6th district and re-elected in 1942. Re-elected in 1944. Re-elected in 1946. Lost renomination.	
James P. Sutton (Lawrenceburg)	Democratic	January 3, 1949 – January 3, 1953	81st 82nd	Elected in 1948. Re-elected in 1950. Redistricted to the 6th district.	
Tom J. Murray (Jackson)	Democratic	January 3, 1953 – December 30, 1966	83rd 84th 85th 86th 87th 88th 89th	Redistricted from the 8th district and re-elected in 1952. Re-elected in 1954. Re-elected in 1956. Re-elected in 1958. Re-elected in 1960. Re-elected in 1962. Re-elected in 1964. Lost renomination and resigned early.	
Vacant		December 31, 1966 – January 2, 1967	89th		
Ray Blanton (Adamsville)	Democratic	January 3, 1967 – January 3, 1973	90th 91st 92nd	Elected in 1966. Re-elected in 1968. Re-elected in 1970. Redistricted to the 6th district and retired to run for U.S. Senator.	
Ed Jones (Yorkville)	Democratic	January 3, 1973 – January 3, 1983	93rd 94th 95th 96th 97th	Redistricted from the 8th district and re-elected in 1972. Re-elected in 1974. Re-elected in 1976. Re-elected in 1978. Re-elected in 1980. Redistricted to the 8th district.	
Don Sundquist (Memphis)	Republican	January 3, 1983 – January 3, 1995	98th 99th 100th 101st 102nd 103rd	Elected in 1982. Re-elected in 1984. Re-elected in 1986. Re-elected in 1988. Re-elected in 1990. Re-elected in 1992. Retired to run for Governor of Tennessee.	
Ed Bryant (Henderson)	Republican	January 3, 1995 – January 3, 2003	104th 105th 106th 107th	Elected in 1994. Re-elected in 1996. Re-elected in 1998. Re-elected in 2000. Retired to run for U.S. Senator.	
Marsha Blackburn (Brentwood)	Republican	January 3, 2003 – January 3, 2019	108th 109th 110th 111th 112th 113th 114th 115th	Elected in 2002. Re-elected in 2004. Re-elected in 2006. Re-elected in 2008. Re-elected in 2010. Re-elected in 2012. Re-elected in 2014. Re-elected in 2016. Retired to run for U.S. Senator.	2003–2013
Marsha Blackburn (Brentwood)	Republican	January 3, 2003 – January 3, 2019	108th 109th 110th 111th 112th 113th 114th 115th	Elected in 2002. Re-elected in 2004. Re-elected in 2006. Re-elected in 2008. Re-elected in 2010. Re-elected in 2012. Re-elected in 2014. Re-elected in 2016. Retired to run for U.S. Senator.	2013–2023
Mark Green (Clarksville)	Republican	January 3, 2019 – July 20, 2025	116th 117th 118th 119th	Elected in 2018. Re-elected in 2020. Re-elected in 2022. Re-elected in 2024. Resigned.	2013–2023
Mark Green (Clarksville)	Republican	January 3, 2019 – July 20, 2025	116th 117th 118th 119th	Elected in 2018. Re-elected in 2020. Re-elected in 2022. Re-elected in 2024. Resigned.	2023–2027
Vacant		July 21, 2025 – December 4, 2025	119th		2023–2027
Matt Van Epps (Nashville)	Republican	December 4, 2025 – present	119th	Elected to finish Green’s term. Re-elected in 2026.	2023–2027

== Recent election results ==
Results under old lines (2013–2023)

2012 Tennessee's 7th congressional district election
Party	Candidate	Votes	%
Republican	Marsha Blackburn (Incumbent)	182,730	71.0
Democratic	Credo Amouzouvik	61,679	24.0
Green	Howard Switzer	4,640	1.8
Independent	Jack Arnold	4,256	1.7
Independent	William Akin	2,740	1.1
Independent	Lenny Ladner	1,261	0.5
Total votes		257,306	100
Republican hold			

2014 Tennessee's 7th congressional district election
Party	Candidate	Votes	%
Republican	Marsha Blackburn (incumbent)	110,534	70.0
Democratic	Daniel Cramer	42,280	26.8
Independent	Leonard D. Ladner	5,093	3.2
Total votes		157,907	100.0
Republican hold			

2016 Tennessee's 7th congressional district election
Party	Candidate	Votes	%
Republican	Marsha Blackburn (incumbent)	200,407	72.2
Democratic	Tharon Chandler	65,226	23.5
Independent	Leonard D. Ladner	11,880	4.3
Total votes		277,513	100.0
Republican hold			

2018 Tennessee's 7th congressional district election
Party	Candidate	Votes	%
Republican	Mark Green	170,071	66.9
Democratic	Justin Kanew	81,661	32.1
Independent	Leonard Ladner	1,582	0.6
Independent	Brent Legendre	1,070	0.4
Total votes		254,384	100.0
Republican hold			

2020 Tennessee's 7th congressional district election
Party	Candidate	Votes	%
Republican	Mark Green (incumbent)	245,188	69.9
Democratic	Kiran Sreepada	95,839	27.3
Independent	Ronald Brown	7,603	2.2
Independent	Scott Vieira	2,005	0.6
Total votes		350,635	100.0
Republican hold			

Results under current lines (2023–present)

2022 Tennessee's 7th congressional district election
Party	Candidate	Votes	%
Republican	Mark Green (incumbent)	108,421	59.96%
Democratic	Odessa Kelly	68,973	38.14%
Independent	Steven J. Hooper	3,428	1.90%
Total votes		180,822	100.00%
Republican hold			

2024 Tennessee's 7th congressional district election
Party	Candidate	Votes	%
Republican	Mark Green (incumbent)	191,992	59.50%
Democratic	Megan Barry	122,764	38.05%
Independent	Shaun Greene	7,900	2.45%
Total votes		322,656	100.00%
Republican hold			

2025 Tennessee's 7th congressional district special election
Party	Candidate	Votes	%
Republican	Matt Van Epps	97,034	53.90%
Democratic	Aftyn Behn	81,109	45.06%
Independent	Jon Thorp	932	0.52%
Independent	Terri Christie	610	0.34%
Independent	Bobby Dodge	198	0.11%
Independent	Robert Sutherby	129	0.07%
Total votes		180,012	100.00%
Republican hold			

== See also ==
- Tennessee's congressional districts
- List of United States congressional districts
- 2025 Tennessee's 7th congressional district special election
