= W. Wirt Courtney =

American politician (1889–1961)

William Wirt Courtney
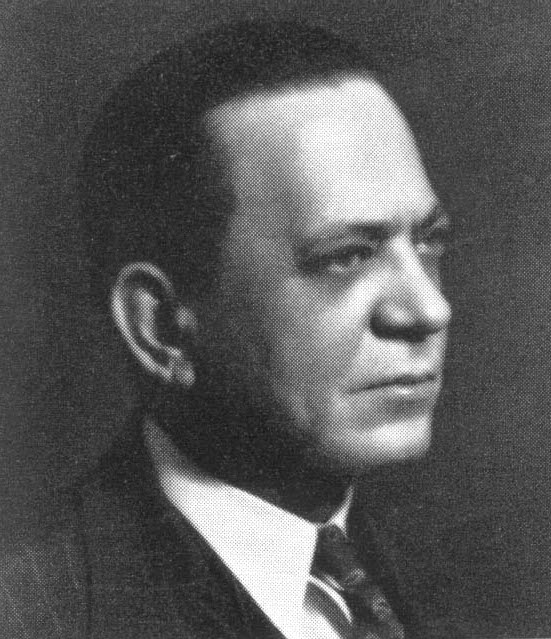
- Tennessee State Library and Archives

Member of the U.S. House of Representatives from Tennessee
- In office May 11, 1939 – January 3, 1949
- Preceded by: Clarence W. Turner
- Succeeded by: James P. Sutton
- Constituency: 6th District (1939-1943); 7th District (1943-1949)

Personal details
- Born: September 7, 1889 Franklin, Tennessee, U.S.
- Died: April 6, 1961 (aged 71) Franklin, Tennessee, U.S.
- Party: Democratic
- Spouse: Currey L. Taylor Courtney
- Education: Sorbonne, Paris, France
- Profession: Attorney; Politician; Judge

Military service
- Allegiance: United States of America
- Branch/service: United States Army
- Years of service: September 1917 to June 1919
- Rank: First lieutenant
- Unit: 117th Infantry, 13th Division
- Battles/wars: World War I

William Wirt Courtney (September 7, 1889 – April 6, 1961) was an American politician and a U.S. Representative from Tennessee.

== Biography ==
Born in Franklin, Tennessee, Courtney was the son of Wirt Courtney and Anne (Neely) Courtney. He graduated from Battle Ground Academy, Franklin, Tennessee, in 1907. He attended Vanderbilt University, Nashville, Tennessee, and the Faculté de Droit of the Sorbonne, Paris, France. He studied law, and was admitted to the bar in 1911. He commenced practice in Franklin, Tennessee.

== Career ==
After serving as City Judge from 1915 to 1917, Courtney enlisted in the United States Army as a private in the One Hundred and Seventeenth Infantry, Thirtieth Division, in September 1917, and was honorably discharged as a first lieutenant in June 1919. He resumed the practice of law in Franklin, Tennessee. He married Currey L. Taylor on December 31, 1919, and they had four children.

Courtney served as adjutant general of Tennessee in 1932, and as a member of the Tennessee National Guard in 1933 with rank of brigadier general. From 1933 to 1939, he served as circuit judge and chancellor of the 17th judicial circuit of Tennessee.

Elected as a Democrat to the Seventy-sixth Congress to fill the vacancy caused by the death of Clarence W. Turner, Courtney was reelected to the Seventy-seventh and to the three succeeding Congresses. He served from May 11, 1939, to January 3, 1949. A confidential 1943 analysis of the House Foreign Affairs Committee by Isaiah Berlin for the British Foreign Office described Eaton as "Typical of the southern Democratic vote of complete support for the Administration's foreign policies." He was an unsuccessful candidate for renomination in 1948, and resumed the practice of law.

== Death ==
Courtney died in Franklin, Tennessee, on April 6, 1961, (age 71 years, 211 days). He is interred at Mount Hope Cemetery.

== See also ==
- List of members of the House Un-American Activities Committee

U.S. House of Representatives
Preceded by Clarence W. Turner	Member of the U.S. House of Representatives from Tennessee's 6th congressional district 1939–1943	Succeeded by Percy Priest
Preceded by Herron C. Pearson	Member of the U.S. House of Representatives from Tennessee's 7th congressional district 1943–1949	Succeeded by James P. Sutton
