= List of United States representatives from Tennessee =

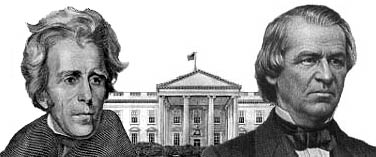
Future presidents who served as U.S. representatives from Tennessee are: Andrew Jackson (1796–1797, at-large), James K. Polk (1825–1839, 6th and 9th) and Andrew Johnson (1843–1853, 1st)

The following is an alphabetical list of United States representatives from the state of Tennessee. For chronological tables of members of both houses of the United States Congress from the state (through the present day), see Tennessee's congressional delegations.

== Current representatives ==
As of December 3, 2025

- 1st district: Diana Harshbarger (R) (since 2021)
- 2nd district: Tim Burchett (R) (since 2019)
- 3rd district: Chuck Fleischmann (R) (since 2011)
- 4th district: Scott DesJarlais (R) (since 2011)
- 5th district: Andy Ogles (R) (since 2023)
- 6th district: John Rose (R) (since 2019)
- 7th district: Matt Van Epps (R) (since 2025)
- 8th district: David Kustoff (R) (since 2017)
- 9th district: Steve Cohen (D) (since 2007)

== List of members ==
Member	Party	Years	District	Notes
Adam R. Alexander	Democratic-Republican	March 4, 1823 – March 4, 1825	9th	Elected in 1823. Switched parties.
Adam R. Alexander	Jacksonian	March 4, 1825 – March 4, 1827	9th	Re-elected in 1825 as a Jacksonian. Lost re-election to D. Crockett.
Clifford Allen	Democratic	November 25, 1975 – June 18, 1978	5th	Elected to finish Fulton's term. Died.
Robert Allen	Democratic-Republican	March 4, 1819 – March 4, 1823	4th	Elected in 1819. Redistricted to the 5th district.
Robert Allen	Democratic-Republican	March 4, 1823 – March 4, 1825	5th	Redistricted from the 4th district and re-elected in 1823. Switched parties.
Robert Allen	Jacksonian	March 4, 1825 – March 4, 1827	5th	Re-elected in 1825 as a Jacksonian. Retired.
Josiah M. Anderson	Whig	March 4, 1849 – March 4, 1851	3rd	Elected in 1849. Lost re-election to Churchwell.
William C. Anderson	Republican	March 4, 1895 – March 4, 1897	1st	Elected in 1894. Lost renomination to Brownlow.
William R. Anderson	Democratic	January 3, 1965 – January 3, 1973	6th	Elected in 1964. Lost re-election to Beard.
Samuel M. Arnell	Unconditional Union	July 24, 1866 – March 4, 1867	6th	Elected in 1865. Switched parties.
Samuel M. Arnell	Republican	March 4, 1867 – March 4, 1871	6th	Re-elected in 1867 as a Republican. Retired.
Thomas D. Arnold	Anti-Jacksonian	March 4, 1831 – March 4, 1833	2nd	Elected in 1831. Redistricted to the 1st district and lost re-election to Blair.
Thomas D. Arnold	Whig	March 4, 1841 – March 4, 1843	1st	Elected in 1841. Retired.
John B. Ashe	Whig	March 4, 1843 – March 4, 1845	10th	Elected in 1843. Retired.
John Atkins	Democratic	March 4, 1857 – March 4, 1859	9th	Elected in 1857. Lost re-election to Etheridge.
John Atkins	Democratic	March 4, 1873 – March 4, 1875	7th	Elected in 1872. Redistricted to the 8th district.
John Atkins	Democratic	March 4, 1875 – March 4, 1883	8th	Redistricted from the 7th district and re-elected in 1874. Retired.
Richard M. Atkinson	Democratic	January 3, 1937 – January 3, 1939	5th	Elected in 1936. Lost renomination to Byrns Jr.
Richard W. Austin	Republican	March 4, 1909 – March 4, 1919	2nd	Elected in 1908. Lost renomination to J.W. Taylor.
William T. Avery	Democratic	March 4, 1857 – March 4, 1861	10th	Elected in 1857. Could not seek re-election, as West Tennessee seceded.
Howard Baker Sr.	Republican	January 3, 1951 – January 7, 1964	2nd	Elected in 1950. Died.
Irene Baker	Republican	March 10, 1964 – January 3, 1965	2nd	Elected to finish her husband's term. Retired.
LaMar Baker	Republican	January 3, 1971 – January 3, 1975	3rd	Elected in 1970. Lost re-election to Lloyd.
John G. Ballentine	Democratic	March 4, 1883 – March 4, 1887	7th	Elected in 1882. Retired.
Washington Barrow	Whig	March 4, 1847 – March 4, 1849	8th	Elected in 1847. Retired.
Ross Bass	Democratic	January 3, 1955 – November 3, 1964	6th	Elected in 1954. Retired to run for U.S. senator and resigned when elected.
Robin Beard	Republican	January 3, 1973 – January 3, 1983	6th	Elected in 1972. Retired to run for U.S. senator.
John Bell	Jacksonian	March 4, 1827 – March 4, 1835	7th	Elected in 1827. Switched parties.
John Bell	Anti-Jacksonian	March 4, 1835 – March 4, 1837	7th	Re-elected in 1835 as an Anti-Jacksonian. Switched parties.
John Bell	Whig	March 4, 1837 – March 4, 1841	7th	Re-elected in 1837 as a Whig. Retired to become U.S. Secretary of War.
Diane Black	Republican	January 3, 2011 – January 3, 2019	6th	Elected in 2010. Retired to run for governor.
Marsha Blackburn	Republican	January 3, 2003 – January 3, 2019	7th	Elected in 2002. Retired to run for U.S. senator.
Julius W. Blackwell	Democratic	March 4, 1839 – March 4, 1841	4th	Elected in 1839. Lost re-election to T. Campbell.
Julius W. Blackwell	Democratic	March 4, 1843 – March 4, 1845	3rd	Elected in 1842. Lost re-election to Crozier.
John Blair	Democratic-Republican	March 4, 1823 – March 4, 1825	1st	Elected in 1823. Switched parties
John Blair	Jacksonian	March 4, 1825 – March 4, 1835	1st	Re-elected in 1825 as a Jacksonian. Lost re-election to Carter.
Ray Blanton	Democratic	January 3, 1967 – January 3, 1973	7th	Elected in 1966. Retired to run for U.S. senator.
William G. Blount	Democratic-Republican	December 8, 1815 – March 4, 1819	2nd	Elected to finish Sevier's term.
Bill Boner	Democratic	January 3, 1979 – October 5, 1987	5th	Elected in 1978. Resigned after becoming Mayor of Nashville.
John H. Bowen	Democratic-Republican	March 4, 1813 – March 4, 1815	4th	Elected in 1813. Retired.
Reese B. Brabson	Opposition	March 4, 1859 – March 4, 1861	3rd	Elected in 1859. Retired.
George W. Bridges	Union	March 4, 1861 – March 4, 1863	3rd	Elected in 1861 but initially unable to take seat when taken prisoner by the Confederate Army. (Note: Seated February 25, 1863 after escaping a Confederate prison.); Unable to seek re-election, as state was under Confederate occupation.
John M. Bright	Democratic	March 4, 1871 – March 4, 1875	4th	Elected in 1870. Redistricted to the 5th district.
John M. Bright	Democratic	March 4, 1875 – March 4, 1881	5th	Redistricted from the 4th district and re-elected in 1874. Lost re-election to Warner as an Independent Democrat.
Bill Brock	Republican	January 3, 1963 – January 3, 1971	3rd	Elected in 1962. Retired to run for U.S. senator.
Aaron V. Brown	Democratic	March 4, 1839 – March 4, 1843	10th	Elected in 1839. Redistricted to the 6th district.
Aaron V. Brown	Democratic	March 4, 1843 – March 4, 1845	6th	Redistricted from the 10th district and re-elected in 1843. Retired to run for governor.
Foster V. Brown	Republican	March 4, 1895 – March 4, 1897	3rd	Elected in 1894. Retired.
Joseph E. Brown	Republican	March 4, 1921 – March 4, 1923	3rd	Elected in 1920. Retired.
Milton Brown	Whig	March 4, 1841 – March 4, 1843	12th	Elected in 1841. Redistricted to the 11th district.
Milton Brown	Whig	March 4, 1843 – March 4, 1847	11th	Redistricted from the 12th district and re-elected in 1843. Retired.
Gordon Browning	Democratic	March 4, 1923 – March 4, 1933	8th	Elected in 1922. Redistricted to the 7th district.
Gordon Browning	Democratic	March 4, 1933 – January 3, 1935	7th	Redistricted from the 8th district and re-elected in 1932. Retired to run for U.S. senator.
Walter P. Brownlow	Republican	March 4, 1897 – July 8, 1910	1st	Elected in 1896. Died.
Henry H. Bryan	Democratic-Republican	March 4, 1819 – March 4, 1821	6th	Elected in 1819. Re-elected but failed to qualify.
Ed Bryant	Republican	January 3, 1995 – January 3, 2003	7th	Elected in 1994. Retired to run for U.S. senator.
Robert M. Bugg	Whig	March 4, 1853 – March 4, 1855	7th	Elected in 1853. Retired.
Samuel Bunch	Jacksonian	March 4, 1833 – March 4, 1835	2nd	Elected in 1833. Switched parties.
Samuel Bunch	Anti-Jacksonian	March 4, 1835 – March 4, 1837	2nd	Re-elected in 1835 as an Anti-Jacksonian. Lost re-election to McClellan.
Tim Burchett	Republican	January 3, 2019 – present	2nd	Elected in 2018. Incumbent.
Mounce G. Butler	Democratic	March 4, 1905 – March 4, 1907	4th	Elected in 1904. Lost renomination to Hull.
Roderick R. Butler	Republican	March 4, 1867 – March 4, 1875	1st	Elected in 1867. Lost re-election to McFarland.
Roderick R. Butler	Republican	March 4, 1887 – March 4, 1889	1st	Elected in 1886. Retired.
Jo Byrns	Democratic	March 4, 1909 – March 4, 1933	6th	Elected in 1908. Redistricted to the 5th district.
Jo Byrns	Democratic	March 4, 1933 – June 4, 1936	5th	Redistricted from the 6th district and re-elected in 1932. Died.
Jo Byrns Jr.	Democratic	January 3, 1939 – January 3, 1941	5th	Elected in 1938. Lost re-election to Priest.
Andrew J. Caldwell	Democratic	March 4, 1883 – March 4, 1887	6th	Elected in 1882. Retired.
Robert P. Caldwell	Democratic	March 4, 1871 – March 4, 1873	7th	Elected in 1870. Lost renomination to Atkins.
William P. Caldwell	Democratic	March 4, 1875 – March 4, 1879	9th	Elected in 1874. Retired.
Brookins Campbell	Democratic	March 4, 1853 – December 25, 1853	1st	Elected in 1853. Died.
George W. Campbell	Democratic-Republican	March 4, 1803 – March 4, 1805	At-large	Elected in 1803. Redistricted to the 2nd district.
George W. Campbell	Democratic-Republican	March 4, 1805 – March 4, 1809	2nd	Redistricted from the at-large district and re-elected in 1805. Retired to become judge of the Tennessee Supreme Court.
Thomas J. Campbell	Whig	March 4, 1841 – March 4, 1843	4th	Elected in 1841. Redistricted to the 3rd district and lost re-election to Blackwell.
William B. Campbell	Whig	March 4, 1837 – March 4, 1843	6th	Elected in 1837. Retired.
William B. Campbell	Union	July 24, 1866 – March 4, 1867	5th	Elected in 1865. Retired.
Newton Cannon	Democratic-Republican	September 16, 1814 – March 4, 1817	5th	Elected to finish Grundy's term. Lost re-election to T. Claiborne.
Newton Cannon	Democratic-Republican	March 4, 1819 – March 4, 1823	5th	Elected in 1819. Retired.
Edward W. Carmack	Democratic	March 4, 1897 – March 4, 1901	10th	Elected in 1896. Retired to run for U.S. senator.
William B. Carter	Anti-Jacksonian	March 4, 1835 – March 4, 1837	1st	Elected in 1835. Swithced parties.
William B. Carter	Whig	March 4, 1837 – March 4, 1841	1st	Re-elected in 1837 as a Whig. Retired.
Robert L. Caruthers	Whig	March 4, 1841 – March 4, 1843	7th	Elected in 1841. Retired.
Clift Chandler	Democratic	January 3, 1935 – January 2, 1940	9th	Elected in 1934. Resigned when elected Mayor of Memphis.
Lucien B. Chase	Democratic	March 4, 1845 – March 4, 1849	9th	Elected in 1845. Retired.
Richard Cheatham	Whig	March 4, 1837 – March 4, 1839	11th	Elected in 1837. Lost re-election to C. Johnson.
William M. Churchwell	Democratic	March 4, 1851 – March 4, 1853	3rd	Elected in 1851. Redistricted to the 2nd district.
William M. Churchwell	Democratic	March 4, 1853 – March 4, 1855	2nd	Redistricted from the 3rd district and re-elected in 1853. Retired.
Thomas Claiborne	Democratic-Republican	March 4, 1817 – March 4, 1819	5th	Elected in 1817. Retired.
William C. C. Claiborne	Democratic-Republican	November 23, 1797 – March 4, 1801	At-large	Elected to finish Jackson's term. Re-elected but resigned to become Governor of Mississippi Territory.
Bob Clement	Democratic	January 19, 1988 – January 3, 2003	5th	Elected to finish Boner's term. Retired to run for U.S. senator.
Andrew J. Clements	Union	March 4, 1861 – March 4, 1863	4th	Elected in 1861. Could not seek re-election, as state was under Confederate occupation.
Wynne F. Clouse	Republican	March 4, 1921 – March 4, 1923	4th	Elected in 1920. Lost re-election to Hull.
John A. Cocke	Democratic-Republican	March 4, 1819 – March 4, 1825	2nd	Elected in 1819. Switched parties.
John A. Cocke	Jacksonian	March 4, 1825 – March 4, 1827	2nd	Re-elected in 1825 as a Jacksonian. Retired.
William M. Cocke	Whig	March 4, 1845 – March 4, 1849	2nd	Elected in 1845. Lost re-election to Watkins as a Democrat.
Steve Cohen	Democratic	January 3, 2007 – present	9th	Elected in 2006. Incumbent.
Edmund Cooper	Union	July 24, 1866 – March 4, 1867	4th	Elected in 1865. Lost re-election to Mullins.
Jere Cooper	Democratic	March 4, 1929 – March 4, 1933	9th	Elected in 1928. Redistricted to the 8th district.
Jere Cooper	Democratic	March 4, 1933 – January 3, 1943	8th	Redistricted from the 9th district and re-elected in 1932. Redistricted to the 9th district.
Jere Cooper	Democratic	March 4, 1943 – January 3, 1953	9th	Redistricted from the 8th district and re-elected in 1942. Redistricted to the 8th district.
Jere Cooper	Democratic	January 3, 1953 – December 18, 1957	8th	Redistricted from the 9th district and re-elected in 1952. Died.
Jim Cooper	Democratic	January 3, 1983 – January 3, 1995	4th	Elected in 1982. Retired to run for U.S. senator.
Jim Cooper	Democratic	January 3, 2003 – January 3, 2023	5th	Elected in 2002. Retired.
W. Wirt Courtney	Democratic	May 11, 1939 – January 3, 1943	6th	Elected to finish Turner's term. Redistricted to the 7th district.
W. Wirt Courtney	Democratic	January 3, 1943 – January 3, 1949	7th	Redistricted from the 6th district and re-elected in 1942. Lost renomination to Sutton.
Nicholas N. Cox	Democratic	March 4, 1891 – March 4, 1901	7th	Elected in 1890. Retired.
Davy Crockett	Jacksonian	March 4, 1827 – March 4, 1829	9th	Elected in 1827. Switched parties.
Davy Crockett	Anti-Jacksonian	March 4, 1829 – March 4, 1831	9th	Re-elected in 1829 as an Anti-Jacksonian. Lost re-election to Fitzgerald.
Davy Crockett	Anti-Jacksonian	March 4, 1833 – March 4, 1835	12th	Elected in 1833. Lost re-election to Huntsman.
John W. Crockett	Whig	March 4, 1837 – March 4, 1841	12th	Elected in 1837. Retired to become attorney general for the ninth district.
John H. Crozier	Whig	March 4, 1845 – March 4, 1849	3rd	Elected in 1845. Retired.
E. H. Crump	Democratic	March 4, 1931 – March 4, 1933	10th	Elected in 1930. Redistricted to the 9th district.
E. H. Crump	Democratic	March 4, 1933 – January 3, 1935	9th	Redistricted from the 10th district and re-elected in 1932. Retired.
William Crutchfield	Republican	March 4, 1873 – March 4, 1875	3rd	Elected in 1872. Retired.
Alvan Cullom	Democratic	March 4, 1843 – March 4, 1847	4th	Elected in 1843. Retired.
William Cullom	Whig	March 4, 1851 – March 4, 1853	8th	Elected in 1851. Redistricted to the 4th district.
William Cullom	Whig	March 4, 1853 – March 4, 1855	4th	Redistricted from the 8th district and re-elected in 1853. Lost re-election to Savage.
Clifford Davis	Democratic	February 14, 1940 – January 3, 1943	9th	Elected to finish Chandler's term. Redistricted to the 10th district.
Clifford Davis	Democratic	January 3, 1943 – January 3, 1953	10th	Redistricted from the 9th district and re-elected in 1942. Redistricted to the 9th district.
Clifford Davis	Democratic	January 3, 1953 – January 3, 1965	9th	Redistricted from the 10th district and re-elected in 1952. Lost renomination to Grider.
David Davis	Republican	January 3, 2007 – January 3, 2009	1st	Elected in 2006. Lost renomination to Roe.
Ewin L. Davis	Democratic	March 4, 1919 – March 4, 1933	5th	Elected in 1918. Lost renomination to Byrns.
Lincoln Davis	Democratic	January 3, 2003 – January 3, 2011	4th	Elected in 2002. Lost re-election to DesJarlais.
Scott DesJarlais	Republican	January 3, 2011 – present	4th	Elected in 2010. Incumbent.
Robert Desha	Jacksonian	March 4, 1827 – March 4, 1831	5th	Elected in 1827. Retired.
George G. Dibrell	Democratic	March 4, 1875 – March 4, 1885	3rd	Elected in 1874. Retired.
David W. Dickinson	Jacksonian	March 4, 1833 – March 4, 1835	8th	Elected in 1833. Retired.
David W. Dickinson	Whig	March 4, 1843 – March 4, 1845	7th	Elected in 1843. Retired.
William Dickson	Democratic-Republican	March 4, 1801 – March 4, 1805	At-large	Elected to finish Claiborne's term. Redistricted to the 3rd district.
William Dickson	Democratic-Republican	March 4, 1805 – March 4, 1807	3rd	Redistricted from the at-large district and re-elected in 1805. Retired.
Jimmy Duncan	Republican	November 8, 1988 – January 3, 2019	2nd	Elected to finish his father's term. Retired.
John Duncan	Republican	January 3, 1965 – June 21, 1988	2nd	Elected in 1964. Died.
William C. Dunlap	Jacksonian	March 4, 1833 – March 4, 1837	13th	Elected in 1833. Lost re-election to C. Williams.
Harold Earthman	Democratic	January 3, 1945 – January 3, 1947	5th	Elected in 1944. Lost renomination to Evins.
Benjamin A. Enloe	Democratic	March 4, 1887 – March 4, 1895	8th	Elected in 1886. Lost re-election to McCall.
Edward E. Eslick	Democratic	March 4, 1925 – June 14, 1932	7th	Elected in 1924. Died.
Willa Eslick	Democratic	August 13, 1932 – March 4, 1933	7th	Elected to finish her husband's term. Retired.
Emerson Etheridge	Whig	March 4, 1853 – March 4, 1855	9th	Elected in 1853. Switched parties
Emerson Etheridge	Know Nothing	March 4, 1855 – March 4, 1857	9th	Re-elected in 1855 as a Know Nothing candidate. Lost re-election to Atkins.
Emerson Etheridge	Opposition	March 4, 1859 – March 4, 1861	9th	Elected in 1859. Retired after West Tennessee seceded.
Henry C. Evans	Republican	March 4, 1889 – March 4, 1891	3rd	Elected in 1888. Lost re-election to H. Snodgrass.
Fats Everett	Democratic	February 1, 1958 – January 26, 1969	8th	Elected to finish Cooper's term. Died.
Joe L. Evins	Democratic	January 3, 1947 – January 3, 1953	5th	Elected in 1946. Redistricted to the 4th district.
Joe L. Evins	Democratic	January 3, 1953 – January 3, 1977	4th	Redistricted from the 5th district and re-elected in 1952. Retired.
Andrew Ewing	Democratic	March 4, 1849 – March 4, 1851	8th	Elected in 1849. Retired.
Edwin H. Ewing	Whig	January 2, 1846 – March 4, 1847	8th	Elected to finish Peyton's term. Retired.
Stephen Fincher	Republican	January 3, 2011 – January 3, 2017	8th	Elected in 2010. Retired.
Hubert Fisher	Democratic	March 4, 1917 – March 4, 1931	10th	Elected in 1916. Retired.
Samuel M. Fite	Democratic	March 4, 1875 – October 23, 1875	4th	Elected to begin representative-elect John W. Head's term. Died.
William Fitzgerald	Jacksonian	March 4, 1831 – March 4, 1833	9th	Elected in 1831. Redistricted to the 12th district and lost re-election to D. Crockett.
Morgan C. Fitzpatrick	Democratic	March 4, 1903 – March 4, 1905	4th	Elected in 1902. Retired.
Chuck Fleischmann	Republican	January 3, 2011 – present	3rd	Elected in 2010. Incumbent.
Harold Ford Jr.	Democratic	January 3, 1997 – January 3, 2007	9th	Elected in 1996. Retired to run for U.S. senator.
Harold Ford Sr.	Democratic	January 3, 1975 – January 3, 1983	8th	Elected in 1974. Redistricted to the 9th district.
Harold Ford Sr.	Democratic	January 3, 1983 – January 3, 1997	9th	Redistricted from the 8th district and re-elected in 1982. Retired.
John B. Forester	Jacksonian	March 4, 1833 – March 4, 1835	5th	Elected in 1833. Switched parties.
John B. Forester	Anti-Jacksonian	March 4, 1835 – March 4, 1837	5th	Re-elected in 1835 as an Anti-Jacksonian. Retired.
James B. Frazier Jr.	Democratic	January 3, 1949 – January 3, 1963	3rd	Elected in 1948. Lost renomination to Wilkes Thrasher Jr.
Richard Fulton	Democratic	January 3, 1963 – August 14, 1975	5th	Elected in 1962. Resigned after becoming Mayor of Nashville.
John W. Gaines	Democratic	March 4, 1897 – March 4, 1909	6th	Elected in 1896. Lost renomination to Byrns.
Abraham E. Garrett	Democratic	March 4, 1871 – March 4, 1873	3rd	Elected in 1870. Redistricted to the 2nd district and lost re-election to Thornburgh.
Finis J. Garrett	Democratic	March 4, 1905 – March 4, 1929	9th	Elected in 1904. Retired to run for U.S. senator.
Meredith P. Gentry	Whig	March 4, 1839 – March 4, 1843	8th	Elected in 1839. Retired.
Meredith P. Gentry	Whig	March 4, 1845 – March 4, 1853	7th	Elected in 1845. Retired.
Henry R. Gibson	Republican	March 4, 1895 – March 4, 1905	2nd	Elected in 1894. Retired.
Presley T. Glass	Democratic	March 4, 1885 – March 4, 1889	9th	Elected in 1884. Lost renomination to Pierce.
Edward I. Golladay	Democratic	March 4, 1871 – March 4, 1873	5th	Elected in 1870. Lost re-election to Harrison.
Bart Gordon	Democratic	January 3, 1985 – January 3, 2011	6th	Elected in 1984. Retired.
George Gordon	Democratic	March 4, 1907 – August 9, 1911	10th	Elected in 1906. Died.
Al Gore	Democratic	January 3, 1977 – January 3, 1983	4th	Elected in 1976. Redistricted to the 6th district.
Al Gore	Democratic	January 3, 1983 – January 3, 1985	6th	Redistricted from the 4th district and re-elected in 1982. Retired to run for U.S. senator.
Albert Gore Sr.	Democratic	January 3, 1939 – December 4, 1944	4th	Elected in 1938. Re-elected but resigned until next term began to enter U.S. Army for fact-finding training.
Albert Gore Sr.	Democratic	January 3, 1945 – January 3, 1953	4th	Re-elected in 1944. Retired to run for U.S. senator.
Mark E. Green	Republican	January 3, 2019 – July 20, 2025	7th	Elected in 2018. Resigned.
George W. Grider	Democratic	January 3, 1965 – January 3, 1967	9th	Elected in 1964. Lost re-election to Kuykendall.
Felix Grundy	Democratic-Republican	March 4, 1811 – March 4, 1813	3rd	Elected in 1811. Redistricted to the 5th district.
Felix Grundy	Democratic-Republican	March 4, 1813 – July 19, 1814	5th	Redistricted from the 3rd district and re-elected in 1813. Resigned.
Nathan W. Hale	Republican	March 4, 1905 – March 4, 1909	2nd	Elected in 1904. Lost re-election to Austin.
William Hall	Jacksonian	March 4, 1831 – March 4, 1833	5th	Elected in 1831. Retired.
Isham G. Harris	Democratic	March 4, 1849 – March 4, 1853	9th	Elected in 1849. Retired.
Thomas K. Harris	Democratic-Republican	March 4, 1813 – March 4, 1815	3rd	Elected in 1813. Lost re-election to I. Thomas.
Horace Harrison	Republican	March 4, 1873 – March 4, 1875	5th	Elected in 1872. Redistricted to the 6th district and lost re-election to House.
Diana Harshbarger	Republican	January 3, 2021 – present	1st	Elected in 2020. Incumbent.
William T. Haskell	Whig	March 4, 1847 – March 4, 1849	11th	Elected in 1847. Retired.
Robert H. Hatton	Opposition	March 4, 1859 – March 4, 1861	5th	Elected in 1859. Retired to join the Confederate Army.
Isaac R. Hawkins	Union	July 24, 1866 – March 4, 1867	7th	Elected in 1865. Switched parties.
Isaac R. Hawkins	Republican	March 4, 1867 – March 4, 1871	7th	Re-elected in 1867 as a Republican. Retired.
Bennett H. Henderson	Democratic-Republican	March 4, 1815 – March 4, 1817	4th	Elected in 1815. Retired.
Hugh Hill	Democratic	March 4, 1847 – March 4, 1849	4th	Elected in 1847. Retired.
Van Hilleary	Republican	January 3, 1995 – January 3, 2003	4th	Elected in 1994. Retired to run for governor.
Samuel E. Hogg	Democratic-Republican	March 4, 1817 – March 4, 1819	4th	Elected in 1817. Retired.
John C. Houk	Republican	December 7, 1891 – March 4, 1895	2nd	Elected to finish his father's term. Lost renomination to Gibson and lost re-election as an Independent Republican.
Leonidas C. Houk	Republican	March 4, 1879 – May 25, 1891	2nd	Elected in 1878. Died.
John F. House	Democratic	March 4, 1875 – March 4, 1883	6th	Elected in 1874. Retired.
Sam Houston	Democratic-Republican	March 4, 1823 – March 4, 1825	7th	Elected in 1823. Switched parties.
Sam Houston	Jacksonian	March 4, 1825 – March 4, 1827	7th	Re-elected in 1825 as a Jacksonian. Retired to run for governor.
William C. Houston	Democratic	March 4, 1905 – March 4, 1919	5th	Elected in 1904. Retired.
Cordell Hull	Democratic	March 4, 1907 – March 4, 1921	4th	Elected in 1906. Lost re-election to Clouse.
Cordell Hull	Democratic	March 4, 1923 – March 4, 1931	4th	Elected in 1922. Retired to run for U.S. senator.
Parry W. Humphreys	Democratic-Republican	March 4, 1813 – March 4, 1815	6th	Elected in 1813. Retired.
Adam Huntsman	Jacksonian	March 4, 1835 – March 4, 1837	12th	Elected in 1835. Retired.
William M. Inge	Jacksonian	March 4, 1833 – March 4, 1835	10th	Elected in 1833. Retired.
Jacob C. Isacks	Democratic-Republican	March 4, 1823 – March 4, 1825	4th	Elected in 1823. Switched parties.
Jacob C. Isacks	Jacksonian	March 4, 1825 – March 4, 1833	4th	Re-elected in 1825 as a Jacksonian. Redistricted to the 5th district and lost re-election to Forester.
Andrew Jackson	Democratic-Republican	December 5, 1796 – September 26, 1797	At-large	Elected to finish the new term. Resigned when elected U.S. senator.
Bill Jenkins	Republican	January 3, 1997 – January 3, 2007	1st	Elected in 1996. Retired.
John Jennings Jr.	Republican	December 30, 1939 – January 3, 1951	2nd	Elected to finish Taylor's term. Lost renomination to H. Baker.
Andrew Johnson	Democratic	March 4, 1843 – March 4, 1853	1st	Elected in 1842. Retired to run for governor.
Cave Johnson	Jacksonian	March 4, 1829 – March 4, 1833	8th	Elected in 1829. Redistricted to the 11th district.
Cave Johnson	Jacksonian	March 4, 1833 – March 4, 1837	11th	Redistricted from the 8th district and re-elected in 1833. Lost re-election to Cheatham.
Cave Johnson	Democratic	March 4, 1839 – March 4, 1843	11th	Elected in 1839. Redistricted to the 9th district.
Cave Johnson	Democratic	March 4, 1843 – March 4, 1845	9th	Redistricted from the 11th district and re-elected in 1843. Retired.
Ed Jones	Democratic	March 25, 1969 – January 3, 1973	8th	Elected to finish Everett's term. Redistricted to the 7th district.
Ed Jones	Democratic	January 3, 1973 – January 3, 1983	7th	Redistricted from the 8th district and re-elected in 1972. Redistricted to the 8th district.
Ed Jones	Democratic	January 3, 1983 – January 3, 1989	8th	Redistricted from the 7th district and re-elected in 1982. Retired.
Francis Jones	Democratic-Republican	March 4, 1817 – March 4, 1823	3rd	Elected in 1817. Retired.
George W. Jones	Democratic	March 4, 1843 – March 4, 1853	5th	Elected in 1843. Redistricted to the 6th district.
George W. Jones	Democratic	March 4, 1853 – March 4, 1859	6th	Redistricted from the 5th district and re-elected in 1853. Retired.
Estes Kefauver	Democratic	September 13, 1939 – January 3, 1949	3rd	Elected to finish McReynolds's term. Retired to run for U.S. senator.
David Kustoff	Republican	January 3, 2017 – present	8th	Elected in 2016. Incumbent.
Dan Kuykendall	Republican	January 3, 1967 – January 3, 1973	9th	Elected in 1966. Redistricted to the 8th district.
Dan Kuykendall	Republican	January 3, 1973 – January 3, 1975	8th	Redistricted from the 9th district and re-elected in 1972. Lost re-election to Ford Sr.
Luke Lea	Jacksonian	March 4, 1833 – March 4, 1835	3rd	Elected in 1833. Switched parties.
Luke Lea	Anti-Jacksonian	March 4, 1835 – March 4, 1837	3rd	Re-elected in 1835 as an Anti-Jacksonian. Retired.
Pryor Lea	Jacksonian	March 4, 1827 – March 4, 1831	2nd	Elected in 1827. Lost re-election to Arnold.
John W. Leftwich	Unconditional Union	July 24, 1866 – March 4, 1867	8th	Elected in 1865. Lost re-election to Nunn.
Barbour Lewis	Republican	March 4, 1873 – March 4, 1875	9th	Elected in 1872. Redistricted to the 10th district and lost re-election to Young.
Marilyn Lloyd	Democratic	January 3, 1975 – January 3, 1995	3rd	Elected in 1974. Retired.
J. Carlton Loser	Democratic	January 3, 1957 – January 3, 1963	5th	Elected in 1956. Lost renomination to Fulton.
Oscar B. Lovette	Republican	March 4, 1931 – March 3, 1933	1st	Elected in 1930. Lost renomination to B.C. Reece.
John H. Marable	Jacksonian	March 4, 1825 – March 4, 1829	8th	Elected in 1825. Lost re-election to C. Johnson.
George W. L. Marr	Democratic-Republican	March 4, 1817 – March 4, 1819	6th	Elected in 1817. Lost renomination to Bryan.
Barclay Martin	Democratic	March 4, 1845 – March 4, 1847	6th	Elected in 1845. Retired.
Zachary D. Massey	Republican	November 8, 1910 – March 4, 1911	1st	Elected to finish Brownlow's term. Retired.
Abram P. Maury	Anti-Jacksonian	March 4, 1835 – March 4, 1837	8th	Elected in 1835. Switched parties.
Abram P. Maury	Whig	March 4, 1837 – March 4, 1839	8th	Re-elected in 1837. Retired.
Horace Maynard	Know Nothing	March 4, 1857 – March 4, 1859	2nd	Elected in 1857. Switched parties.
Horace Maynard	Opposition	March 4, 1859 – March 4, 1861	2nd	Re-elected in 1859 as an Opposition party candidate. Switched parties.
Horace Maynard	Union	March 4, 1861 – March 4, 1863	2nd	Re-elected in 1861 as a Unionist. Could not seek re-election, as state was under Confederate occupation.
Horace Maynard	Unconditional Union	July 24, 1866 – March 4, 1867	2nd	Elected in 1865. Switched parties.
Horace Maynard	Republican	March 4, 1867 – March 4, 1873	2nd	Re-elected in 1867 as a Republican. Redistricted to the at-large district.
Horace Maynard	Republican	March 4, 1873 – March 4, 1875	At-large	Redistricted from the 2nd district and re-elected in 1872. Retired.
John E. McCall	Republican	March 4, 1895 – March 4, 1897	8th	Elected in 1894. Lost re-election to Sims.
Abraham McClellan	Democratic	March 4, 1837 – March 4, 1843	2nd	Elected in 1837. Retired.
Jim N. McCord	Democratic	January 3, 1943 – January 3, 1945	5th	Elected in 1942. Retired to run for governor.
James C. McDearmon	Democratic	March 4, 1893 – March 4, 1897	9th	Elected in 1892. Lost renomination to Pierce.
William McFarland	Democratic	March 4, 1875 – March 4, 1877	1st	Elected in 1874. Lost re-election to Randolph.
Kenneth McKellar	Democratic	December 4, 1911 – March 4, 1917	10th	Elected to finish Gordon's term. Retired to run for U.S. senator.
Benton McMillin	Democratic	March 4, 1879 – January 6, 1899	4th	Elected in 1878. Retired to run for governor and resigned when elected.
Samuel Davis McReynolds	Democratic	March 4, 1923 – July 11, 1939	3rd	Elected in 1922. Died.
Pleasant M. Miller	Democratic-Republican	March 4, 1809 – March 4, 1811	3rd	Elected in 1809. Retired.
James C. Mitchell	Jacksonian	March 4, 1825 – March 4, 1829	3rd	Elected in 1825. Lost re-election to Standifer.
John R. Mitchell	Democratic	March 4, 1931 – January 3, 1939	4th	Elected in 1930. Retired to run for U.S. senator.
John A. Moon	Democratic	March 4, 1897 – March 4, 1921	3rd	Elected in 1896. Lost re-election to J. Brown.
William R. Moore	Republican	March 4, 1881 – March 4, 1883	10th	Elected in 1880. Renominated but declined.
James Mullins	Republican	March 4, 1867 – March 4, 1869	4th	Elected in 1867. Retired.
Tom J. Murray	Democratic	January 3, 1943 – January 3, 1953	8th	Elected in 1942. Redistricted to the 7th district.
Tom J. Murray	Democratic	January 3, 1953 – December 30, 1966	7th	Redistricted from the 8th district and re-elected in 1952. Lost renomination to Blanton and resigned early.
John R. Neal	Democratic	March 4, 1885 – March 4, 1889	3rd	Elected in 1884. Retired.
Thomas A. R. Nelson	Opposition	March 4, 1859 – March 3, 1861	1st	Elected in 1859. Re-elected but captured en route to Congress and failed to take his seat.
David A. Nunn	Republican	March 4, 1867 – March 4, 1869	8th	Elected in 1867. Lost re-election to W. Smith as an Independent Republican.
David A. Nunn	Republican	March 4, 1873 – March 4, 1875	8th	Elected in 1872. Redistricted to the 9th district and lost re-election to W. Caldwell.
Andy Ogles	Republican	January 3, 2023 – present	5th	Elected in 2022. Incumbent.
Lemuel P. Padgett	Democratic	March 4, 1901 – August 2, 1922	7th	Elected in 1900. Died.
Josiah Patterson	Democratic	March 4, 1891 – March 4, 1897	10th	Elected in 1890. Lost re-election to Carmack as a National Democrat.
Malcolm R. Patterson	Democratic	March 4, 1901 – November 5, 1906	10th	Elected in 1900. Retired to run for governor and resigned when elected.
Herron C. Pearson	Democratic	January 3, 1935 – January 3, 1943	7th	Elected in 1934. Retired.
Augustus H. Pettibone	Republican	March 4, 1881 – March 4, 1887	1st	Elected in 1880. Retired.
Balie Peyton	Jacksonian	March 4, 1833 – March 4, 1835	6th	Elected in 1833. Switched parties.
Balie Peyton	Anti-Jacksonian	March 4, 1835 – March 4, 1837	6th	Re-elected in 1835 as an Anti-Jacksonian. Retired.
Joseph H. Peyton	Whig	March 4, 1843 – November 11, 1845	8th	Elected in 1843. Died.
James Phelan Jr.	Democratic	March 4, 1887 – January 30, 1891	10th	Elected in 1886. Retired but died before next term began.
Dayton E. Phillips	Republican	January 3, 1947 – January 3, 1951	1st	Elected in 1946. Lost renomination to B.C. Reece.
Rice A. Pierce	Democratic	March 4, 1883 – March 4, 1885	9th	Elected in 1882. Lost renomination to Glass.
Rice A. Pierce	Democratic	March 4, 1889 – March 4, 1893	9th	Elected in 1888. Lost re-election to McDearmon as an Independent Democrat.
Rice A. Pierce	Democratic	March 4, 1897 – March 4, 1905	9th	Elected in 1896. Lost renomination to F. Garrett.
James K. Polk	Jacksonian	March 4, 1825 – March 4, 1833	6th	Elected in 1825. Redistricted to the 9th district.
James K. Polk	Jacksonian	March 4, 1833 – March 4, 1837	9th	Redistricted from the 6th district and re-elected in 1833. Switched parties.
James K. Polk	Democratic	March 4, 1837 – March 4, 1839	9th	Re-elected in 1837 as a Democrat. Retired to run for governor.
William H. Polk	Democratic	March 4, 1851 – March 4, 1853	6th	Elected in 1851. Retired.
Samuel Powell	Democratic-Republican	March 4, 1815 – March 4, 1817	1st	Elected in 1815. Retired.
Percy Priest	Independent Democratic	January 3, 1941 – January 3, 1943	5th	Elected in 1940. Redistricted to the 6th district.
Percy Priest	Democratic	January 3, 1943 – January 3, 1953	6th	Elected in 1942. Redistricted to the 5th district.
Percy Priest	Democratic	January 3, 1953 – October 12, 1956	5th	Redistricted from the 6th district and re-elected in 1952. Died.
William F. Prosser	Republican	March 4, 1869 – March 4, 1871	5th	Elected in 1868. Lost re-election to Golladay.
James M. Quarles	Opposition	March 4, 1859 – March 4, 1861	8th	Elected in 1859. Could not seek re-election, as West Tennessee seceded.
Jimmy Quillen	Republican	January 3, 1963 – January 3, 1997	1st	Elected in 1962. Retired.
James H. Randolph	Republican	March 4, 1877 – March 4, 1879	1st	Elected in 1876. Retired.
Charles Ready	Whig	March 4, 1853 – March 4, 1855	5th	Elected in 1853. Switched parties.
Charles Ready	Know Nothing	March 4, 1855 – March 4, 1859	5th	Re-elected in 1855 as a Know Nothing candidate. Lost re-election to Hatton.
B. Carroll Reece	Republican	March 4, 1921 – March 4, 1931	1st	Elected in 1920. Lost renomination to Lovette.
B. Carroll Reece	Republican	March 4, 1933 – January 3, 1947	1st	Elected in 1932. Retired to serve as chairman of the Republican National Committee.
B. Carroll Reece	Republican	January 3, 1951 – March 19, 1961	1st	Elected in 1950. Died.
Louise Goff Reece	Republican	May 16, 1961 – January 3, 1963	1st	Elected to finish her husband's term. Retired.
James B. Reynolds	Democratic-Republican	March 4, 1815 – March 4, 1817	6th	Elected in 1815. Lost re-election to Marr.
James B. Reynolds	Democratic-Republican	March 4, 1823 – March 4, 1825	8th	Elected in 1823. Lost re-election to Marable.
John Rhea	Democratic-Republican	March 4, 1803 – March 4, 1805	At-large	Elected in 1803. Redistricted to the 1st district.
John Rhea	Democratic-Republican	March 4, 1805 – March 4, 1815	1st	Redistricted from the at-large district and re-elected in 1805. Lost re-election to Powell.
John Rhea	Democratic-Republican	March 4, 1817 – March 4, 1823	1st	Elected in 1817. Retired.
James D. Richardson	Democratic	March 4, 1885 – March 4, 1905	5th	Elected in 1884. Retired.
Haywood Y. Riddle	Democratic	December 14, 1875 – March 4, 1879	4th	Elected to finish Fite's term. Retired.
Thomas Rivers	Know Nothing	March 4, 1855 – March 4, 1857	10th	Elected in 1855. Retired.
Phil Roe	Republican	January 3, 2009 – January 3, 2021	1st	Elected in 2008. Retired.
John Rose	Republican	January 3, 2019 – present	6th	Elected in 2018. Incumbent.
William C. Salmon	Democratic	March 4, 1923 – March 4, 1925	7th	Elected in 1922. Retired.
James T. Sandford	Democratic-Republican	March 4, 1823 – March 4, 1825	6th	Elected in 1823. Lost re-election to J. Polk.
John H. Savage	Democratic	March 4, 1849 – March 4, 1853	4th	Elected in 1849. Retired.
John H. Savage	Democratic	March 4, 1855 – March 4, 1859	4th	Elected in 1855. Lost re-election to Stokes.
Lon A. Scott	Republican	March 4, 1921 – March 4, 1923	8th	Elected in 1920. Lost re-election to Browning.
Sam R. Sells	Republican	March 4, 1911 – March 4, 1921	1st	Elected in 1910. Lost renomination to B.C. Reece.
William T. Senter	Whig	March 4, 1843 – March 4, 1845	2nd	Elected in 1842. Retired.
John Sevier	Democratic-Republican	March 4, 1811 – September 24, 1815	2nd	Elected in 1811. Died. (Note: During the First Congress, which was in existence from 1789 to 1791, the former Governor of Franklin, represented what was to become the State of Tennessee, which was originally the 5th district of North Carolina and during his term of office called "the Southwest Territory.")
Ebenezer J. Shields	Anti-Jacksonian	March 4, 1835 – March 4, 1837	10th	Elected in 1835. Switched parties.
Ebenezer J. Shields	Whig	March 4, 1837 – March 4, 1839	10th	Re-elected in 1837 as a Whig. Lost re-election to A. Brown.
Charles B. Simonton	Democratic	March 4, 1879 – March 4, 1883	9th	Elected in 1878. Retired.
Thetus W. Sims	Democratic	March 4, 1897 – March 4, 1921	8th	Elected in 1896. Lost renomination to Scott.
Samuel A. Smith	Democratic	March 4, 1853 – March 4, 1859	3rd	Elected in 1853. Lost re-election to Brabson.
William J. Smith	Republican	March 4, 1869 – March 4, 1871	8th	Elected in 1868. Lost re-election to Vaughan.
William H. Sneed	Know Nothing	March 4, 1855 – March 4, 1857	2nd	Elected in 1855. Retired.
Charles E. Snodgrass	Democratic	March 4, 1899 – March 4, 1903	4th	Elected in 1898. Lost renomination to Fitzpatrick.
Henry C. Snodgrass	Democratic	March 4, 1891 – March 4, 1895	3rd	Elected in 1890. Lost re-election to F. Brown.
James I. Standifer	Democratic-Republican	March 4, 1823 – March 4, 1825	3rd	Elected in 1823. Lost re-election to J.C. Mitchell.
James I. Standifer	Jacksonian	March 4, 1829 – March 4, 1833	3rd	Elected in 1829. Redistricted to the 4th district.
James I. Standifer	Jacksonian	March 4, 1833 – March 4, 1835	4th	Redistricted from the 3rd district and re-elected in 1833. Switched parties.
James I. Standifer	Anti-Jacksonian	March 4, 1835 – March 4, 1837	4th	Re-elected in 1835 as an Anti-Jacksonian. Switched parties.
James I. Standifer	Whig	March 4, 1837 – August 20, 1837	4th	Re-elected in 1837 as a Whig. Died.
Frederick P. Stanton	Democratic	March 4, 1845 – March 4, 1855	10th	Elected in 1845. Retired.
William B. Stokes	Opposition	March 4, 1859 – March 4, 1861	4th	Elected in 1859. Retired.
William B. Stokes	Unconditional Union	July 24, 1866 – March 4, 1867	3rd	Elected in 1865. Switched parties.
William B. Stokes	Republican	March 4, 1867 – March 4, 1871	3rd	Re-elected in 1867 as a Republican. Lost re-election to A. Garrett.
William Stone	Whig	September 14, 1837 – March 4, 1839	4th	Elected to finish Standifer's term. Lost re-election to Blackwell.
Don Sundquist	Republican	January 3, 1983 – January 3, 1995	7th	Elected in 1982. Retired to run for governor.
James P. Sutton	Democratic	January 3, 1949 – January 3, 1953	7th	Elected in 1948. Redistricted to the 6th district.
James P. Sutton	Democratic	January 3, 1953 – January 3, 1955	6th	Redistricted from the 7th district and re-elected in 1952. Retired to run for U.S. senator.
John S. Tanner	Democratic	January 3, 1989 – January 3, 2011	8th	Elected in 1988. Retired.
Alfred A. Taylor	Republican	March 4, 1889 – March 3, 1895	1st	Elected in 1888. Retired.
J. Will Taylor	Republican	March 4, 1919 – November 14, 1939	2nd	Elected in 1918. Died.
John M. Taylor	Democratic	March 4, 1883 – March 4, 1887	8th	Elected in 1882. Retired.
Nathaniel G. Taylor	Whig	March 30, 1854 – March 4, 1855	1st	Elected to finish Campbell's term. Lost re-election to Watkins.
Nathaniel G. Taylor	Union	July 24, 1866 – March 4, 1867	1st	Elected in 1865. Retired.
Robert L. Taylor	Democratic	March 4, 1879 – March 4, 1881	1st	Elected in 1878. Lost re-election to Pettibone.
Zachary Taylor	Republican	March 4, 1885 – March 4, 1887	10th	Elected in 1884. Lost re-election to Phelan.
Isaac Thomas	Democratic-Republican	March 4, 1815 – March 4, 1817	3rd	Elected in 1815. Retired.
James H. Thomas	Democratic	March 4, 1847 – March 4, 1851	6th	Elected in 1847. Lost re-election to W. Polk.
James H. Thomas	Democratic	March 4, 1859 – March 4, 1861	6th	Elected in 1859. Retired.
Jacob M. Thornburgh	Republican	March 4, 1873 – March 4, 1879	2nd	Elected in 1872. Retired.
Lewis Tillman	Republican	March 4, 1869 – March 4, 1871	4th	Elected in 1868. Retired.
John Trimble	Republican	March 4, 1867 – March 4, 1869	5th	Elected in 1867. Retired.
Clarence W. Turner	Democratic	November 7, 1922 – March 4, 1923	7th	
Clarence W. Turner	Democratic	March 4, 1933 – March 23, 1939	6th	Elected in 1932. Died.
Hopkins L. Turney	Democratic	March 4, 1837 – March 4, 1843	5th	Elected in 1837. Retired.
Matt Van Epps	Republican	December 2, 2025 – present	7th	Elected to finish Green's term. Incumbent.
William W. Vaughan	Democratic	March 4, 1871 – March 4, 1873	8th	Elected in 1870. Retired.
Zach Wamp	Republican	January 3, 1995 – January 3, 2011	3rd	Elected in 1994. Retired to run for governor.
Richard Warner	Democratic	March 4, 1881 – March 4, 1885	5th	Elected in 1880. Lost renomination to Richardson.
Joseph E. Washington	Democratic	March 4, 1887 – March 4, 1897	6th	Elected in 1886. Retired.
Albert G. Watkins	Whig	March 4, 1849 – March 4, 1853	2nd	Elected in 1849. Redistricted to the 1st district and lost re-election to Campbell.
Albert G. Watkins	Democratic	March 4, 1855 – March 4, 1859	1st	Elected in 1855. Retired.
Harvey M. Watterson	Democratic	March 4, 1839 – March 4, 1843	9th	Elected in 1839. Retired.
Robert Weakley	Democratic-Republican	March 4, 1809 – March 4, 1811	2nd	Elected in 1809. Retired.
Jesse Wharton	Democratic-Republican	March 4, 1807 – March 4, 1809	3rd	Elected in 1807. Retired.
Washington C. Whitthorne	Democratic	March 4, 1871 – March 4, 1875	6th	Elected in 1870. Redistricted to the 7th district.
Washington C. Whitthorne	Democratic	March 4, 1875 – March 4, 1883	7th	Redistricted from the 6th district and re-elected in 1874. Retired.
Washington C. Whitthorne	Democratic	March 4, 1887 – March 4, 1891	7th	Elected in 1886. Retired.
Christopher H. Williams	Whig	March 4, 1837 – March 4, 1843	13th	Elected in 1837. Retired.
Christopher H. Williams	Whig	March 4, 1849 – March 4, 1853	11th	Elected in 1849. Redistricted to the 9th district and lost re-election to Etheridge.
Joseph L. Williams	Whig	March 4, 1837 – March 4, 1843	3rd	Elected in 1837. Lost renomination to T. Campbell.
John V. Wright	Democratic	March 4, 1855 – March 4, 1861	7th	Elected in 1855. Could not seek re-election, as West Tennessee seceded.
H. Casey Young	Democratic	March 4, 1875 – March 4, 1881	10th	Elected in 1874. Lost re-election to Moore.
H. Casey Young	Democratic	March 4, 1883 – March 4, 1885	10th	Elected in 1882. Retired.
Felix Zollicoffer	Whig	March 4, 1853 – March 4, 1855	8th	Elected in 1853. Switched parties.
Felix Zollicoffer	Know Nothing	March 4, 1855 – March 4, 1859	8th	Re-elected in 1855 as a Know Nothing candidate. Retired.

== See also ==
- List of United States senators from Tennessee
- Tennessee's congressional delegations
- Tennessee's congressional districts
