= Tennessee's congressional districts =

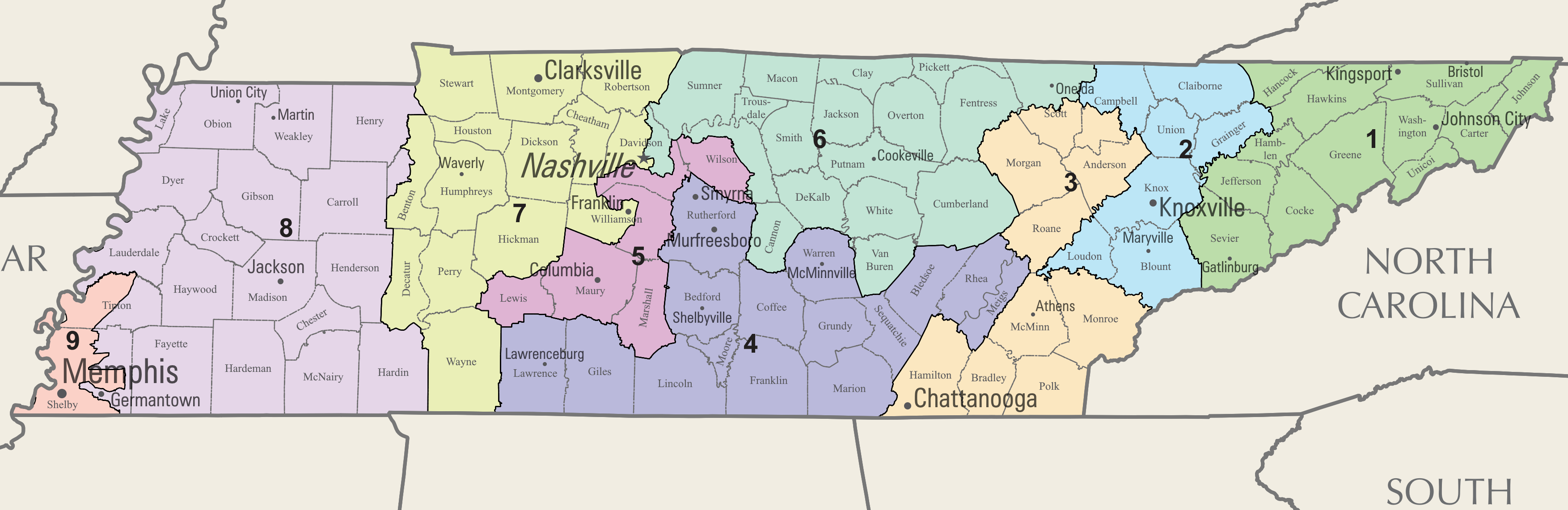
Map of Tennessee's congressional districts since January 3, 2023 Interactive map version

District lines to be used from the 2026 elections, per HB 7003 signed by the Governor of Tennessee on May 7, 2026 Interactive map version

There are currently nine United States congressional districts in Tennessee based on results from the 2020 United States census. There have been as few as eight and as many as thirteen congressional districts in Tennessee. The 13th district and the 12th district were lost after the 1840 census. The 11th district was lost after the 1850 census and the 10th district was last lost after the 1950 census. The 9th district was briefly lost after the 1970 census but was regained after the 1980 census.

== Current districts and representatives ==
This is a list of United States representatives from Tennessee, their terms, their district boundaries, and the district political ratings according to the CPVI. The delegation has a total of nine members, with eight Republicans and one Democrat.

The Tennessee congressional maps are an example of partisan gerrymandering, in this case by the Republican-controlled state legislature, which in 2022 drew maps to ‘crack’ the Democratic stronghold of Nashville across three otherwise Republican districts, ensuring three Republican representatives, despite Nashville’s strong Democratic lean and population sufficient for a single district. Critics claimed that this Republican gerrymander ‘diminished the influence of Black voters and other voters of color concentrated in Nashville’, by splitting them up and adding portions of the Nashville community into districts that are overwhelmingly white and Republican, thus diluting the voting power of Black voters in the state.’ However, in 2024 a federal court ruled that while the gerrymander is a clear ‘political gerrymander’ it didn’t fit the criteria for a ‘racial gerrymander.’

The state’s districts were further gerrymandered by the Republican state legislature when it dismantled the previously Democratic 9th District, based around the city of Memphis, turning all congressional districts in the state into ones with a Republican lean, per the Cook Partisan Index.

Current U.S. representatives from Tennessee
District	Member (Residence)	Party	Incumbent since	CPVI (2026)	District map
1st	Diana Harshbarger (Kingsport)	Republican	since January 3, 2021	R+29	
2nd	Tim Burchett (Knoxville)	Republican	since January 3, 2019	R+17	
3rd	Chuck Fleischmann (Ooltewah)	Republican	since January 3, 2011	R+18	
4th	Scott DesJarlais (Sherwood)	Republican	since January 3, 2011	R+11	
5th	Andy Ogles (Culleoka)	Republican	since January 3, 2023	R+10	
6th	John Rose (Cookeville)	Republican	since January 3, 2019	R+13	
7th	Matt Van Epps (Nashville)	Republican	since December 4, 2025	R+11	
8th	David Kustoff (Germantown)	Republican	since January 3, 2017	R+10	
9th	Steve Cohen (Memphis)	Democratic	since January 3, 2007	R+9	

== Historical results ==
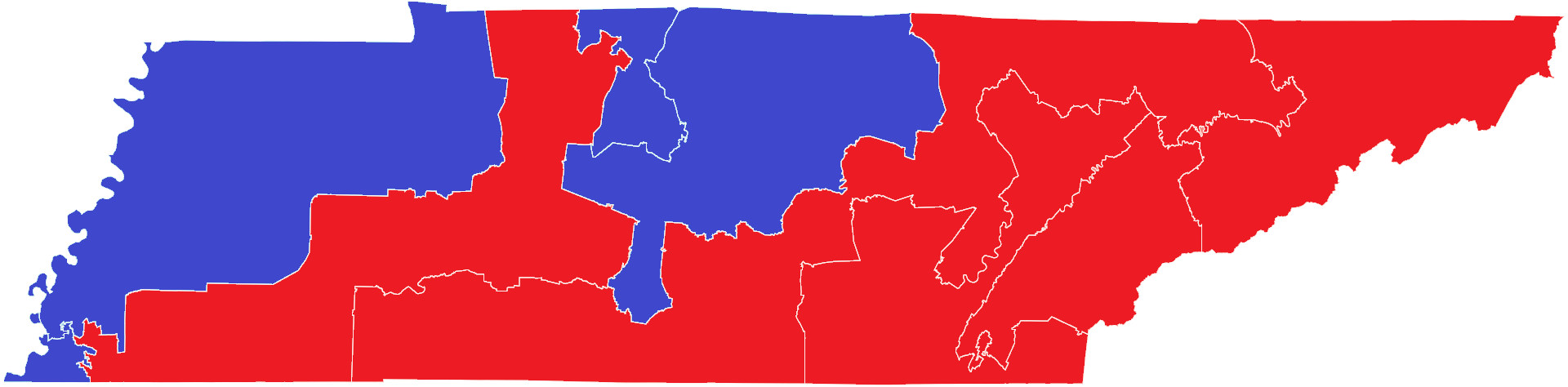
1994

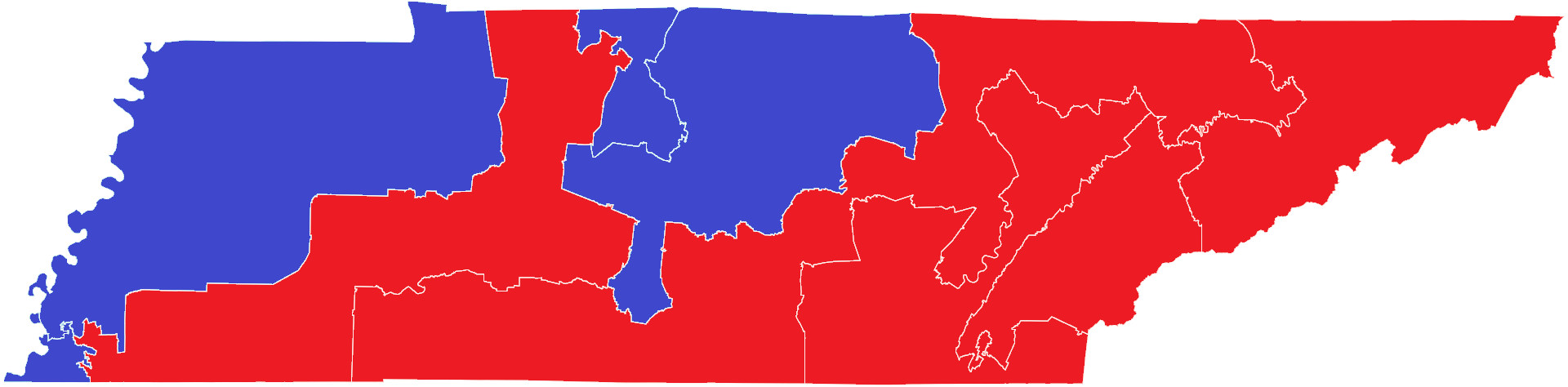
1996

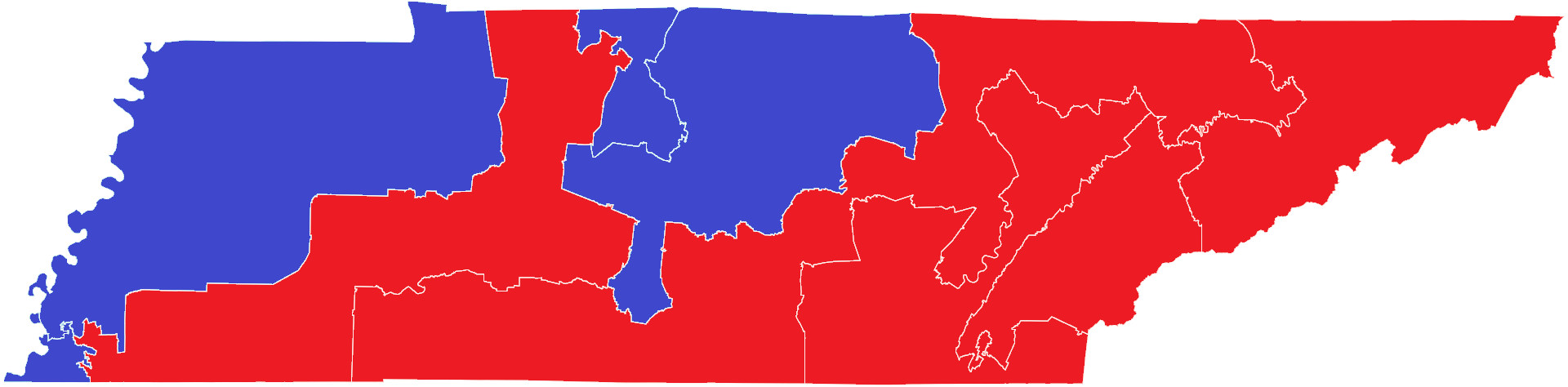
1998

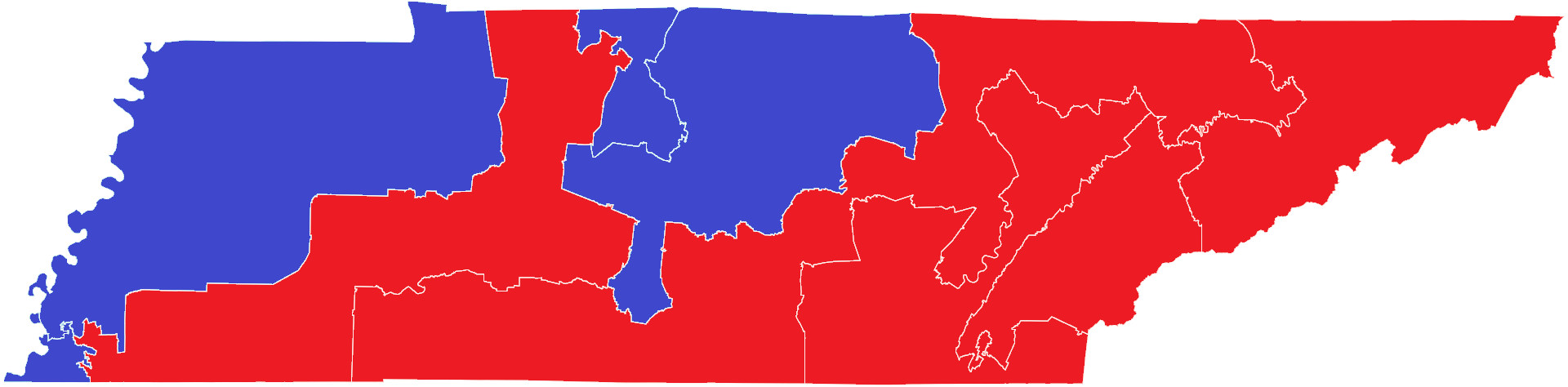
2000

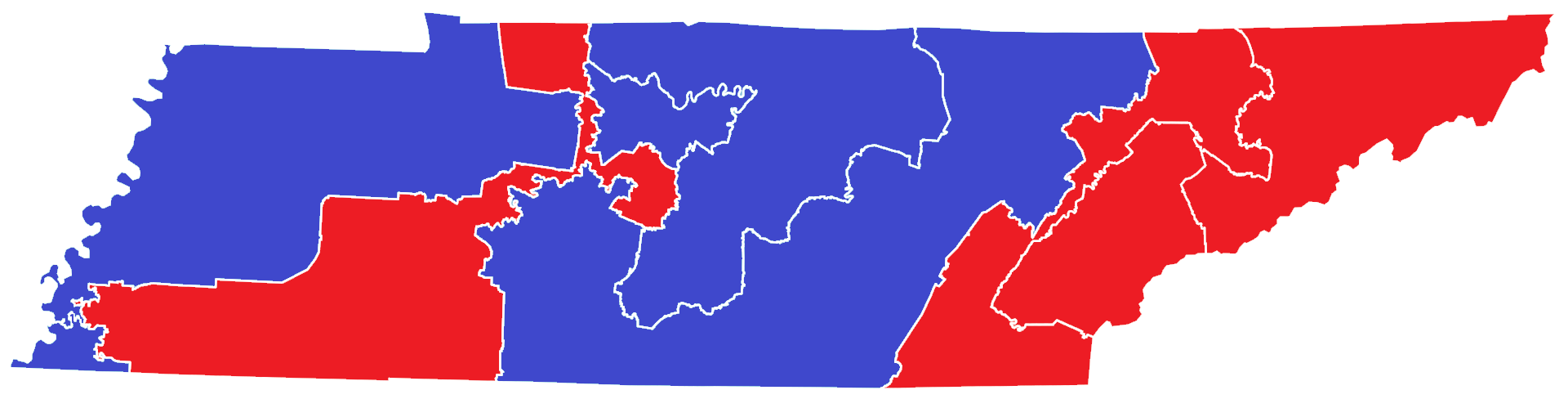
2002

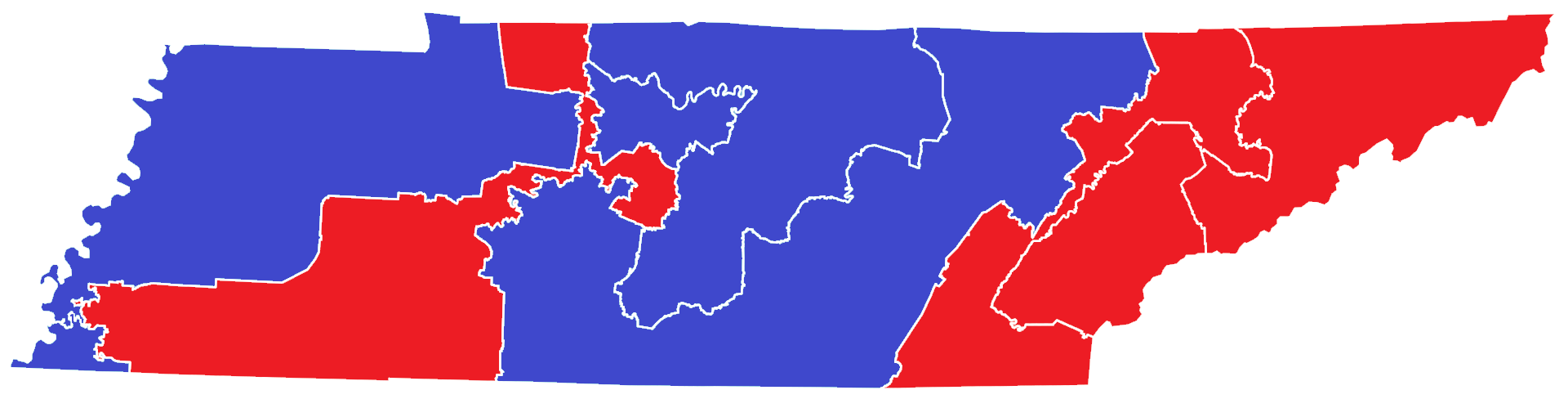
2004

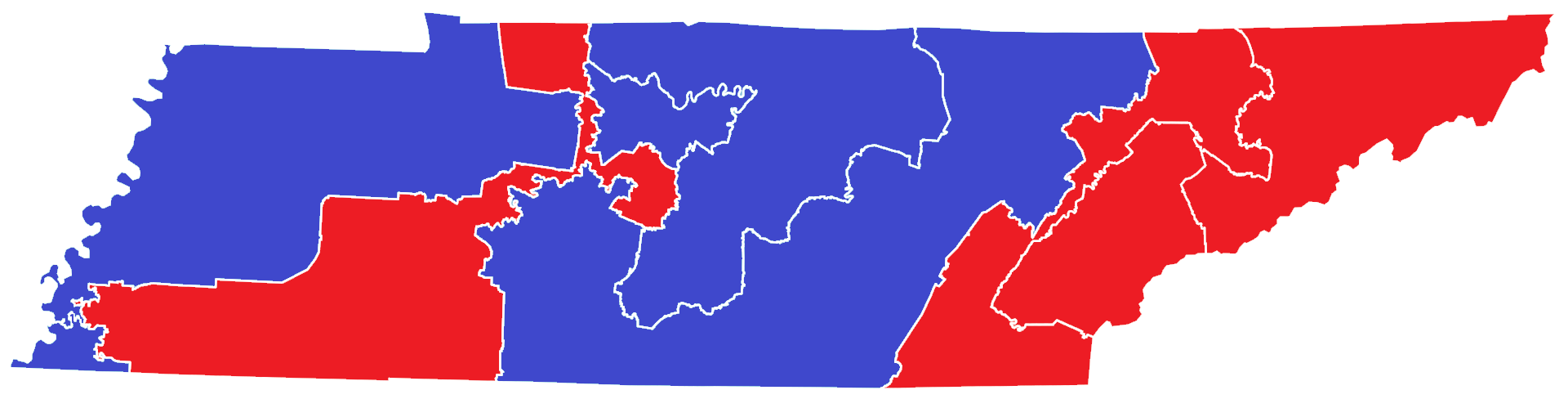
2006

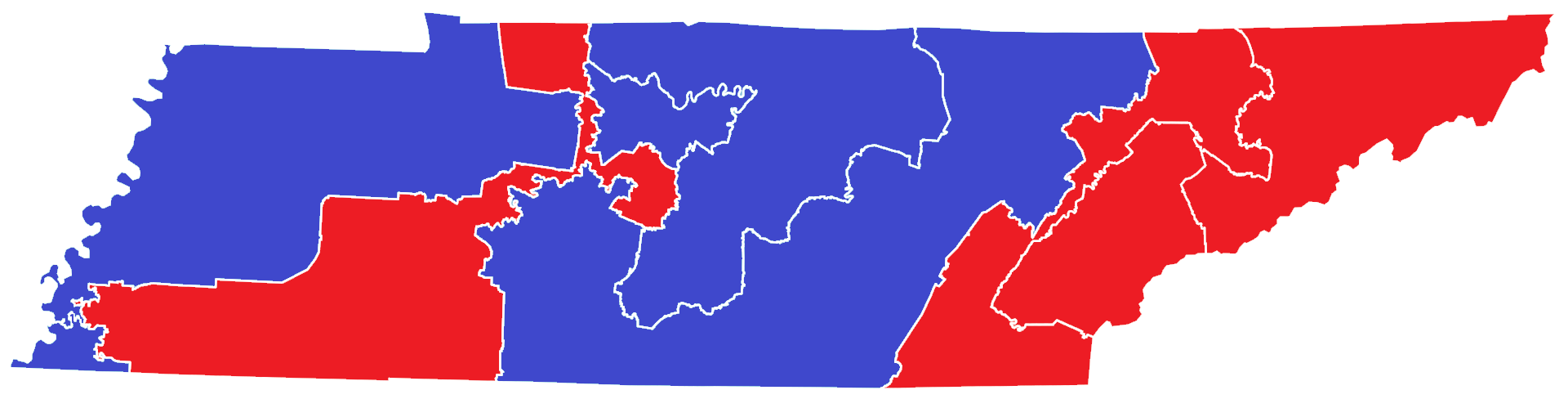
2008

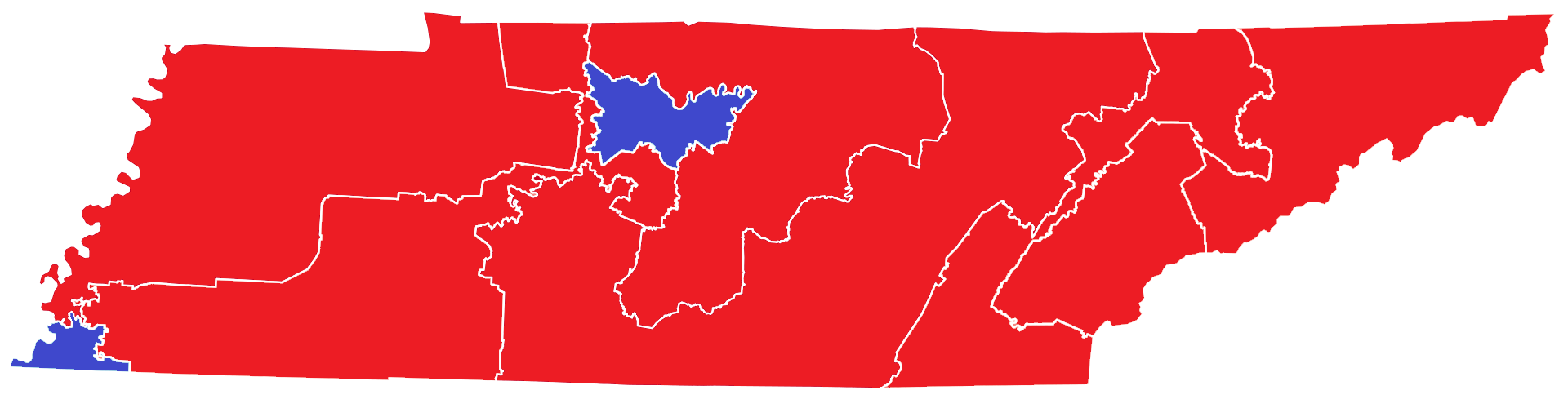
2010

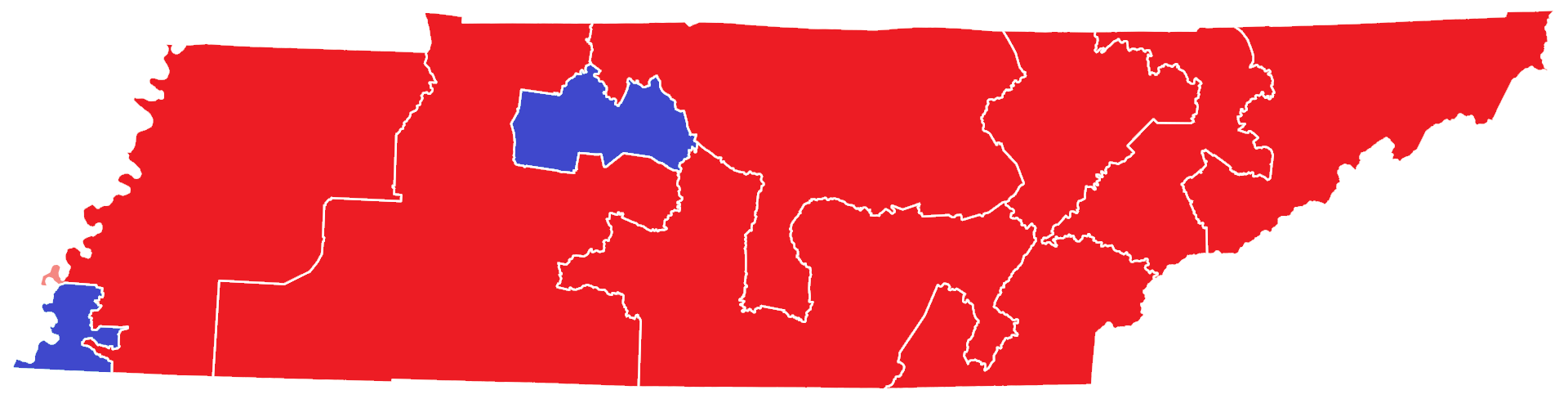
2012

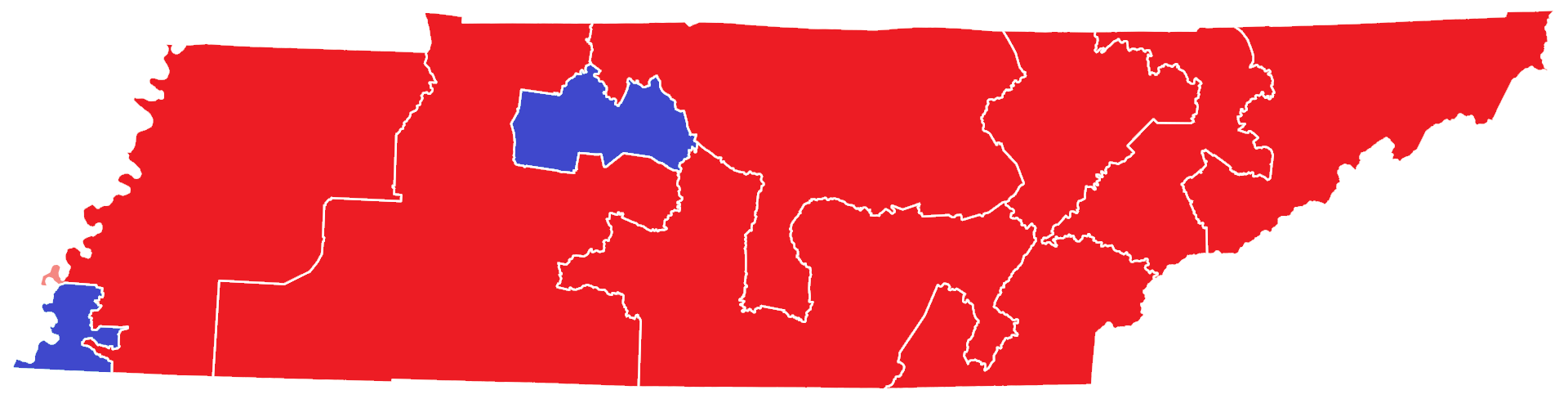
2014

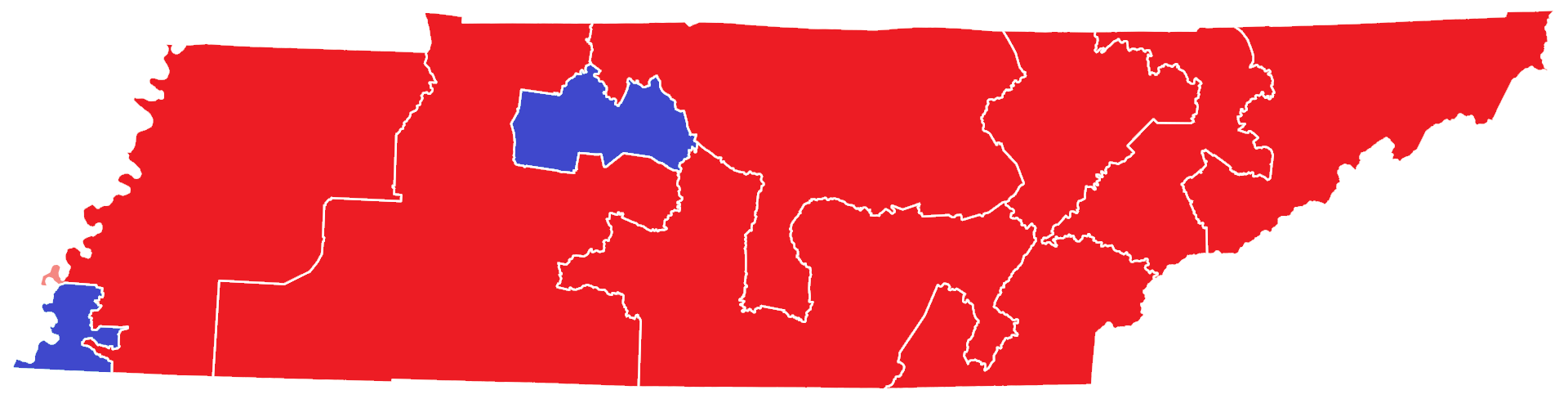
2016

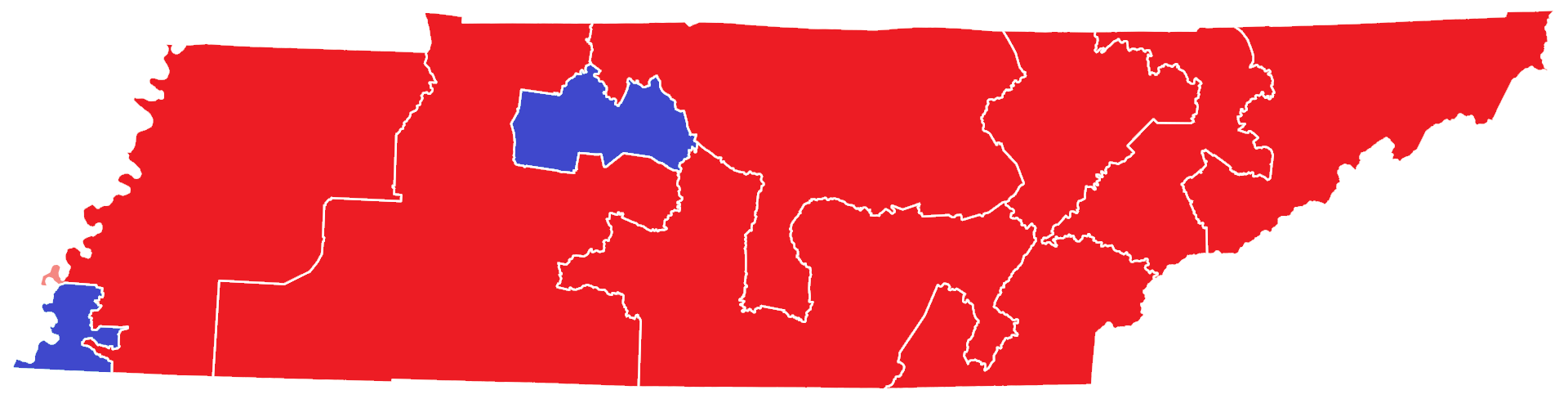
2018

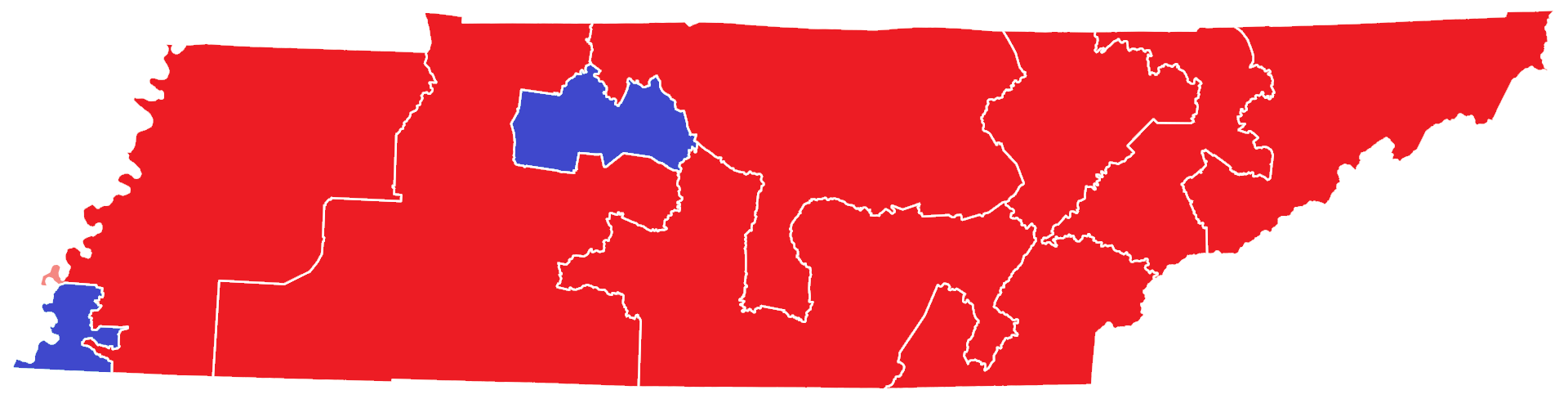
2020

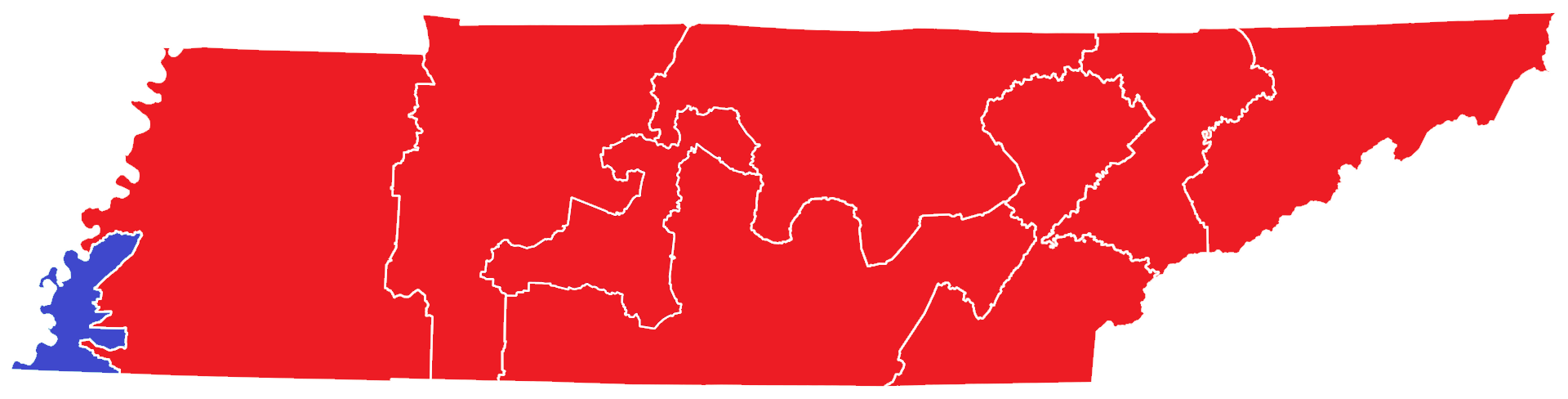
2022

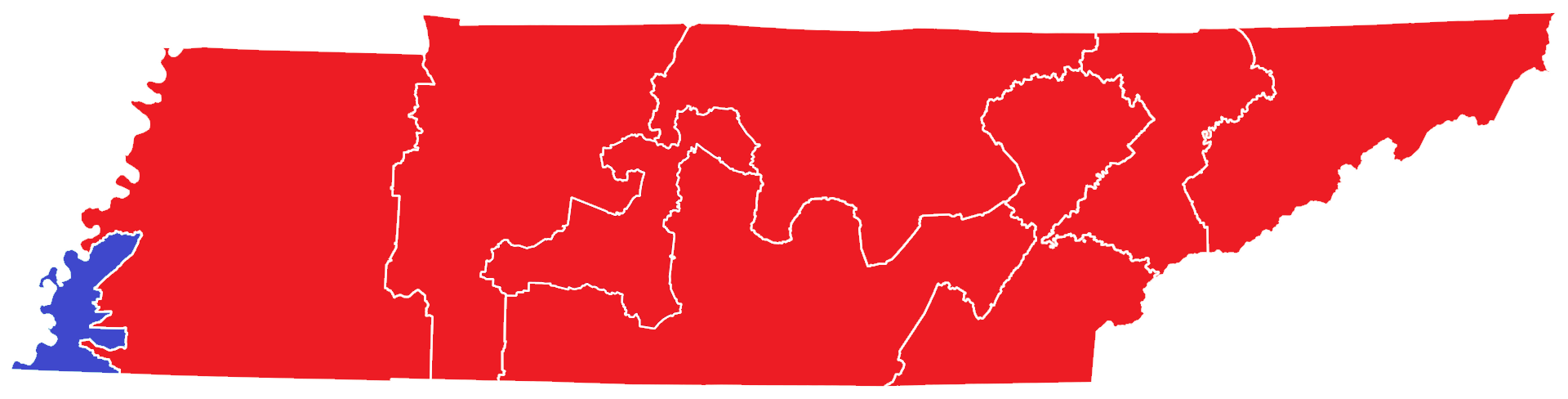
2024

== Historical and present district boundaries ==
Table of United States congressional district boundary maps in the State of Tennessee, presented chronologically. All redistricting events that took place in Tennessee between 1973 and 2013 are shown.

Year	Statewide map
1973–1982	
1983–1992	
1993–2002	
2003–2013	
2013–2023	

Tennessee's 2nd congressional district
- Interactive map of district boundaries since January 3, 2023
- Representative: Chuck Fleischmann

Due to three county island parcels near Sweetwater, Tennessee, Tennessee's 2nd congressional district is not geographically contiguous — rather it is politically contiguous, with county exclaves "connected" despite being entirely-surrounded by Tennessee's 3rd congressional district.

== Obsolete districts ==
- Southwest Territory's at-large congressional district, obsolete since statehood
- Tennessee's at-large congressional district (1796–1805; 1873–1875)
- Tennessee's 10th congressional district, obsolete since the 1950 census
- Tennessee's 11th congressional district, obsolete since the 1850 census
- Tennessee's 12th congressional district, obsolete since the 1840 census
- Tennessee's 13th congressional district, obsolete since the 1840 census

== See also ==
- List of United States congressional districts
- Baker v. Carr
