= Lucien Bonaparte Chase =

American politician (1817–1864)

Member of the U.S. House of Representatives from Tennessee's 9th district
- In office March 4, 1845 – March 3, 1849
- Preceded by: Cave Johnson
- Succeeded by: Isham G. Harris

Personal details
- Born: December 5, 1817 Derby Line, Vermont, U.S.
- Died: December 4, 1864 (aged 46) Derby Line, Vermont, U.S.
- Party: Democratic
- Profession: teacher; lawyer; politician

Lucien Bonaparte Chase (December 5, 1817 – December 4, 1864) was an American politician and a member of the United States House of Representatives for Tennessee's 9th congressional district.

== Biography ==
Chase was born in Derby Line, Vermont on December 5, 1817, the son of Jacob and Hannah W. Chase.

== Career ==
Chase moved to Dover, Tennessee around 1838 and taught school. He studied law, was admitted to the bar, and began his practice in Charlotte, Tennessee in Dickson County. He moved to Clarksville, Tennessee and resumed the practice of law.

Elected as a member of the Democratic Party to the Twenty-ninth and Thirtieth Congresses, Chase served from March 4, 1845 to March 3, 1849. He declined to be a candidate for re-election in 1848, and he moved to New York City in 1849. He again resumed the practice of law.

== Death ==
Chase died in Derby Line, Vermont on December 4, 1864 (age 46 years, 365 days). He is interred in Green-Wood Cemetery in Brooklyn, New York.

== Bibliography ==
- History of the Polk administration (1850)
- English serfdom and American slavery or, Ourselves--As others see us (1854)

U.S. House of Representatives
Preceded by Cave Johnson	Member of the U.S. House of Representatives from Tennessee's 9th congressional district 1845–1849	Succeeded by Isham G. Harris
