= John Hartwell Marable =

American politician (1786–1844)

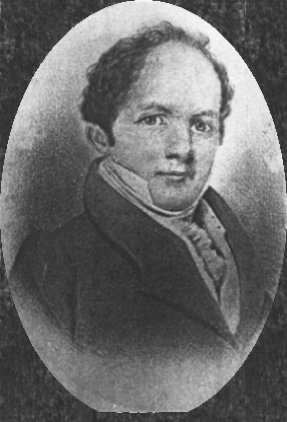
- John Hartwell Marable

Member of the U.S. House of Representatives from Tennessee's 8th district
- In office March 4, 1825 – March 3, 1829
- Preceded by: James B. Reynolds
- Succeeded by: Cave Johnson

Member of the Tennessee Senate
- In office 1817–1818

Personal details
- Born: November 18, 1786 Brunswick County, Virginia
- Died: April 11, 1844 (aged 57) Montgomery County, Tennessee, U.S.
- Party: Jacksonian Republican
- Spouse: Ann Jones "Nancy" Watson Marable
- Children: Sally Ann Marable; Ann Jones Marable; Mary Marable; John Hartwell Marable II; Mary Marable
- Education: University of Pennsylvania School of Medicine

John Hartwell Marable (November 18, 1786 – April 11, 1844) was an American politician who represented Tennessee in the United States House of Representatives.

== Biography ==
Marable was born near Lawrenceville, Virginia, on November 18, 1786. He pursued an academic course and studied in Philadelphia, Pennsylvania. According to compiled records, he attended the University of Pennsylvania School of Medicine in 1805 and 1806. He married Ann Jones "Nancy" Watson on July 17, 1808 in Davidson County, Tennessee.

== Career ==
Marable practiced medicine and moved to Yellow Creek, Tennessee, where he continued to engage in the practice, and served as Postmaster, Yellow Creek, Montgomery County, Tennessee. He owned slaves. He was a member of the Tennessee Senate in 1817 and 1818. He elected alderman for the city of Clarksville, Tennessee in 1819, and was a Charter Member of the Medical Association in Tennessee.

Marable was elected as a Jacksonian Republican to the Nineteenth and Twentieth Congresses, serving from March 4, 1825 to March 3, 1829. He was an unsuccessful candidate for re-election to the Twenty-first Congress, and resumed his practice.

== Death ==
Marable died in Montgomery County, Tennessee on April 11, 1844 (age 57 years, 145 days). He is interred at Marable Cemetery near Clarksville, Tennessee.

U.S. House of Representatives
Preceded by James B. Reynolds	Member of the U.S. House of Representatives from Tennessee's 8th congressional district 1825–1829	Succeeded by Cave Johnson
