= Cave Johnson =

American politician (1793–1866)

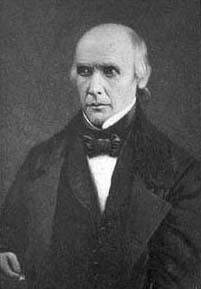

12th United States Postmaster General
- In office March 6, 1845 – March 4, 1849
- President: James K. Polk
- Preceded by: Charles A. Wickliffe
- Succeeded by: Jacob Collamer

Member of the U.S. House of Representatives from Tennessee
- In office March 4, 1839 – March 3, 1845
- Preceded by: Richard Cheatham
- Succeeded by: Lucien Bonaparte Chase
- Constituency: 9th district (1843–1845); 11th district (1839–1843)
- In office March 4, 1829 – March 3, 1837
- Preceded by: John Hartwell Marable
- Succeeded by: Richard Cheatham
- Constituency: 11th district (1833–1837); 8th district (1829–1833)

Personal details
- Born: January 11, 1793 Tennessee County, Southwest Territory, U.S.
- Died: November 23, 1866 (aged 73) Clarksville, Tennessee, U.S.
- Party: Democratic
- Spouse: Elizabeth Dortch Brunson
- Education: Cumberland College

Cave Johnson (January 11, 1793 – November 23, 1866) was an American politician who served the state of Tennessee as a Democratic congressman in the United States House of Representatives. Johnson was the 12th United States Postmaster General in the administration of James K. Polk from 1845 to 1849.

== Early life ==
Johnson was born near present-day Springfield, Tennessee to Mary Noel and Thomas Johnson. He was named for Rev. Richard Cave, a Baptist minister in the Travelling Church with whom Mary's mother, also named Mary Noel, had been acquainted in Kentucky. He suspected but could never prove a relation to William Cave Johnson of Boone County, Kentucky. He was studying at Cumberland College when the War of 1812 began, and organized a band of volunteers that Andrew Jackson declined to deploy. In 1813 he joined his father's militia unit in the Creek War, returning to Nashville the next year to complete law studies in the firm of Parry Wayne Humphreys.

== Career ==
Johnson settled in Clarksville and served on its first board of aldermen. At the time of his first election to Congress in 1829, he owned an iron factory that employed both free and enslaved black workers. He advocated legal protection of slavery under the federal constitution, believing that this would prevent "moderate" southerners from being overwhelmed by secessionist Fire-Eaters.

Samuel Morse's proposal for the Baltimore–Washington telegraph line came before Congress for funding during Johnson's tenure. Johnson mocked the idea by introducing a rider to fund research into animal magnetism. After the line was successfully demonstrated he apologized to Morse, calling the telegraph an "astonishing invention".

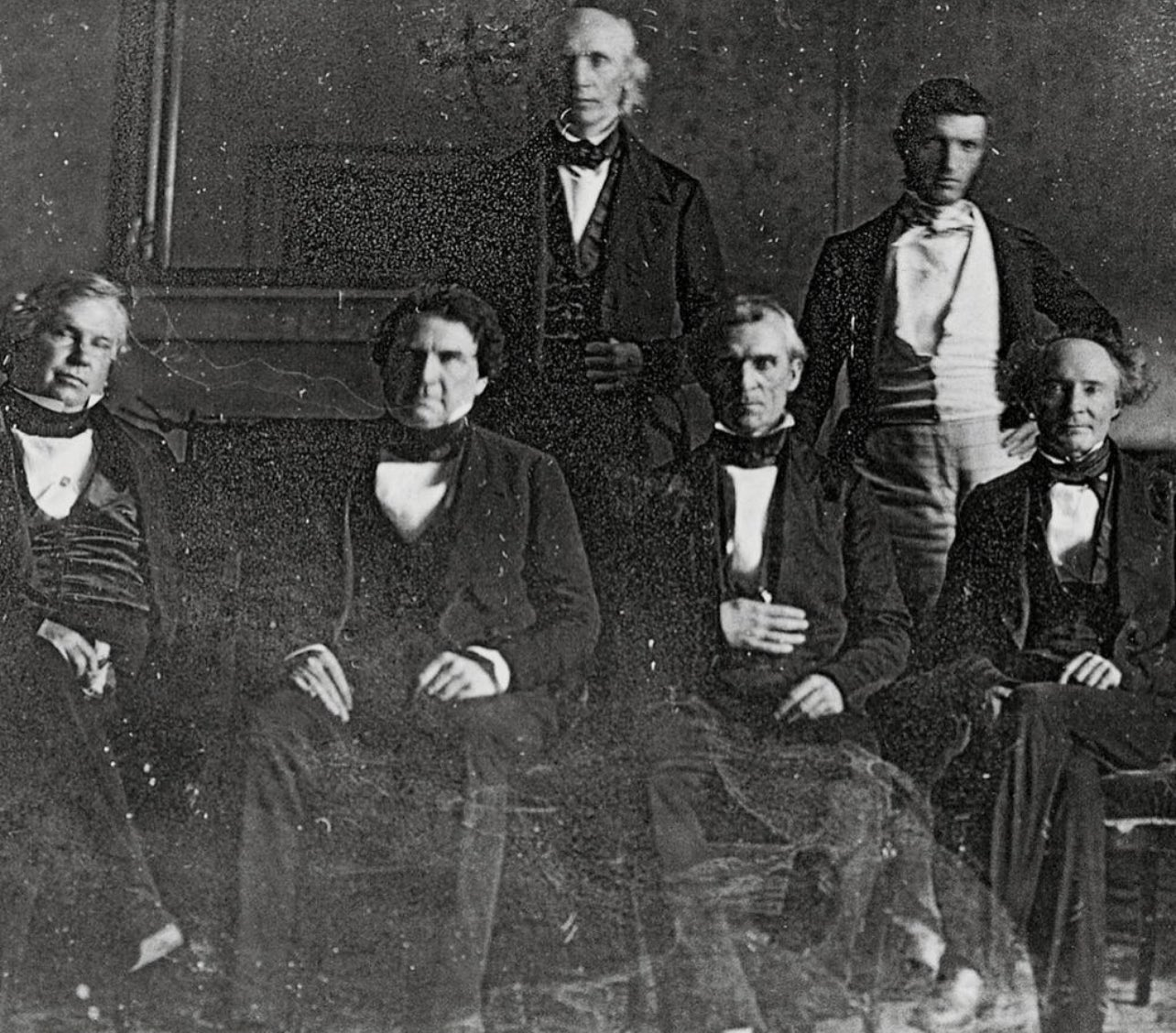
Johnson (standing middle) in Polk's cabinet 1845

Johnson acted as a campaign manager for presidential candidate James K. Polk at both the Democratic party convention and for the general election. After his victory Polk appointed him Postmaster General, which he held during the full term. He shifted the department from a collect on delivery system to a prepaid system by introducing the adhesive postage stamp in 1847. Johnson's duties included overseeing operation of the Baltimore–Washington line, which he struggled to make profitable as other private telegraph lines were constructed. He urged that telegraph lines not be left in unregulated private hands, concerned that they would ruin the Post Office while enriching those who held preferential information access, but his fellow Democrats were unreceptive.

He later served as a state circuit court judge and as president of the Third Bank of Tennessee from 1854 to 1860. During the secession crisis he joined the short-lived Union Party that sought to keep Tennessee loyal to the federal government. He joined in drafting an address that urged the state to remain in the Union while refusing to participate in coercive measures against the Confederacy. Failing in this effort, he sided with the Confederacy but took no personal part in the war. After the Battle of Fort Donelson brought Clarksville under Union control, Johnson was one of three spokesmen who greeted the administering Union officer. He was elected to the state Senate in 1866, but allies of Republican Governor William G. Brownlow refused to seat him. He died in Tennessee on November 23, 1866.

== Personal life ==
Johnson proposed to Elizabeth Dortch in 1815. She rejected him for another suitor, embarrassing him so deeply that he dared not pursue a woman again for more than twenty years. His next proposal in 1838 was to the same Elizabeth Dortch, by then widowed. She accepted and they had three sons. Johnson was the maternal uncle of Lt. Col. Cave Johnson Couts of California

U.S. House of Representatives
| Preceded by John Hartwell Marable | Member of the U.S. House of Representatives from Tennessee's 8th congressional district 1829–1833 | Succeeded by David W. Dickinson |
| New constituency | Member of the U.S. House of Representatives from Tennessee's 11th congressional district 1833–1837 | Succeeded by Richard Cheatham |
| Preceded by Richard Cheatham | Member of the U.S. House of Representatives from Tennessee's 11th congressional district 1839–1843 | Succeeded by Milton Brown |
| Preceded by James Iver McKay | Chair of the House Military Affairs Committee; 1839–1840 | Succeeded by Waddy Thompson Jr. |
| Preceded by Harvey Watterson | Member of the U.S. House of Representatives from Tennessee's 9th congressional district 1843–1845 | Succeeded by Lucien Chase |
Political offices
| Preceded by Charles A. Wickliffe | United States Postmaster General; 1845–1849 | Succeeded by Jacob Collamer |
