= Adam Huntsman =

American politician

Member of the U.S. House of Representatives from Tennessee's 12th district
- In office March 4, 1835 – March 3, 1837
- Preceded by: Davy Crockett
- Succeeded by: John W. Crockett

Member of the Tennessee Senate
- In office 1815–1821; 1827–1831

Personal details
- Born: February 11, 1786 Charlotte County, Virginia, US
- Died: August 23, 1849 (aged 63) Jackson, Tennessee, US
- Party: Jacksonian
- Profession: lawyer; politician

Adam Huntsman (February 11, 1786 – August 23, 1849) was an American lawyer and politician who represented Tennessee's twelfth district in the United States House of Representatives from 1835 to 1837. He was a slaveholder.

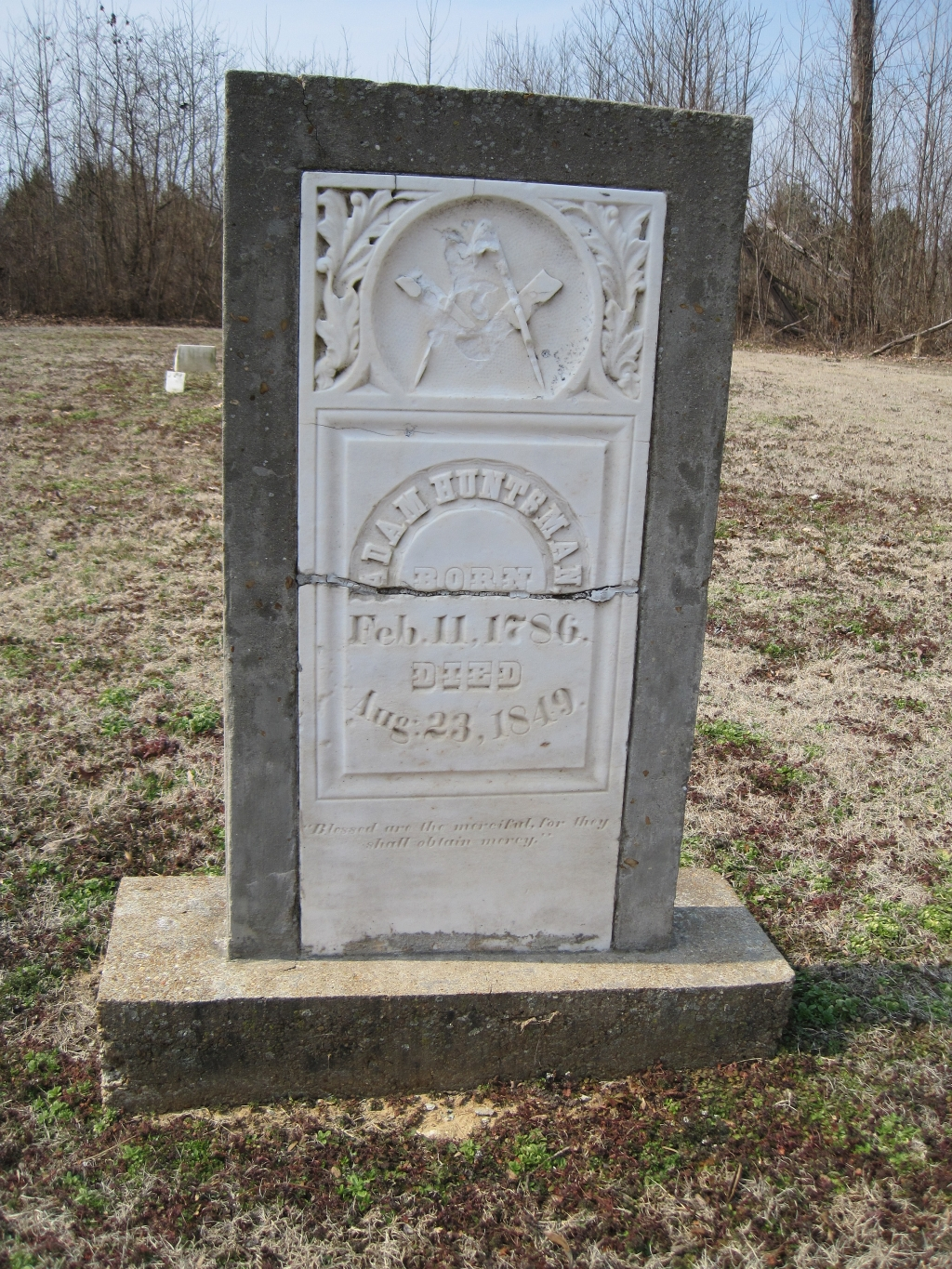
Adam Huntsman grave in the Old Salem Cemetery in Jackson, Tennessee

== Biography ==
Huntsman was born in Charlotte County, Virginia, on February 11, 1786. He came to Knox County, Tennessee, in 1809, where he settled for about three years. It was here that he studied law under John Williams, one of Knoxville's most prominent attorneys in the early nineteenth century and later a United States Senator.

== Career ==
Huntsman carried the legal skills he learned from Williams with him westward to Overton County, Tennessee and later Madison County, Tennessee, where he became a highly regarded criminal lawyer.

Huntsman served in the Tennessee state senate from 1815 to 1821 and from 1827 to 1831. A proponent of revision to the state constitution, he was elected a delegate for Madison County, Tennessee, at the constitutional convention held in Nashville, Tennessee, in 1834. He defeated David Crockett for the Twelfth Congressional seat in 1835, a loss that led to Crockett's journey to Texas and his death at the Alamo.

Huntsman served one term as a Jacksonian Democrat to the Twenty-fourth Congress. A leader of the Democratic Party in West Tennessee in the 1830s and 1840s, he corresponded with notable politicians of his day such as Andrew Jackson, James K. Polk, James Buchanan, and John C. Calhoun. His term lasted from March 4, 1835, to March 4, 1837. He ran unsuccessfully for re-election to the Twenty-fifth Congress, losing to John Wesley Crockett, his predecessor's son.

== Legacy ==
Huntsman died in Jackson, Madison County, Tennessee on August 23, 1849 (aged 63) and is interred at Old Salem Cemetery near Jackson.

His daughter, Anne Huntsman Scurlock, had a grave marker placed in the "colored section" of Riverside Cemetery in Jackson, Tennessee, for an enslaved man named Silas, who died in 1857. The marker reads "He is not forgotten by his attached mistress."

Huntsman had an amputated leg, and used a wooden prosthetic; Davy Crockett reportedly disparaged him as a "timber toe." Jane Thomas mentioned Huntsman in her recollections of early Nashville: "He boarded in the house where I boarded. He had a small room to himself. The colored boy that waited on the gentlemen went up with him to the room to get his boots. He came running back, frightened nearly to death, and said he could not stay in the room where that man was, because he took all the hair off his head and laid it on the table, and took his teeth out, and then took off one of his legs. 'Law! Miss Sallie,' he said, 'I can't stay where that man is: he's taking himself all to pieces!'"

U.S. House of Representatives
Preceded by Davy Crockett	Member of the U.S. House of Representatives from Tennessee's 12th congressional district March 4, 1835 – March 4, 1837	Succeeded by John Wesley Crockett
