= John Wesley Crockett =

American politician (1807–1852)

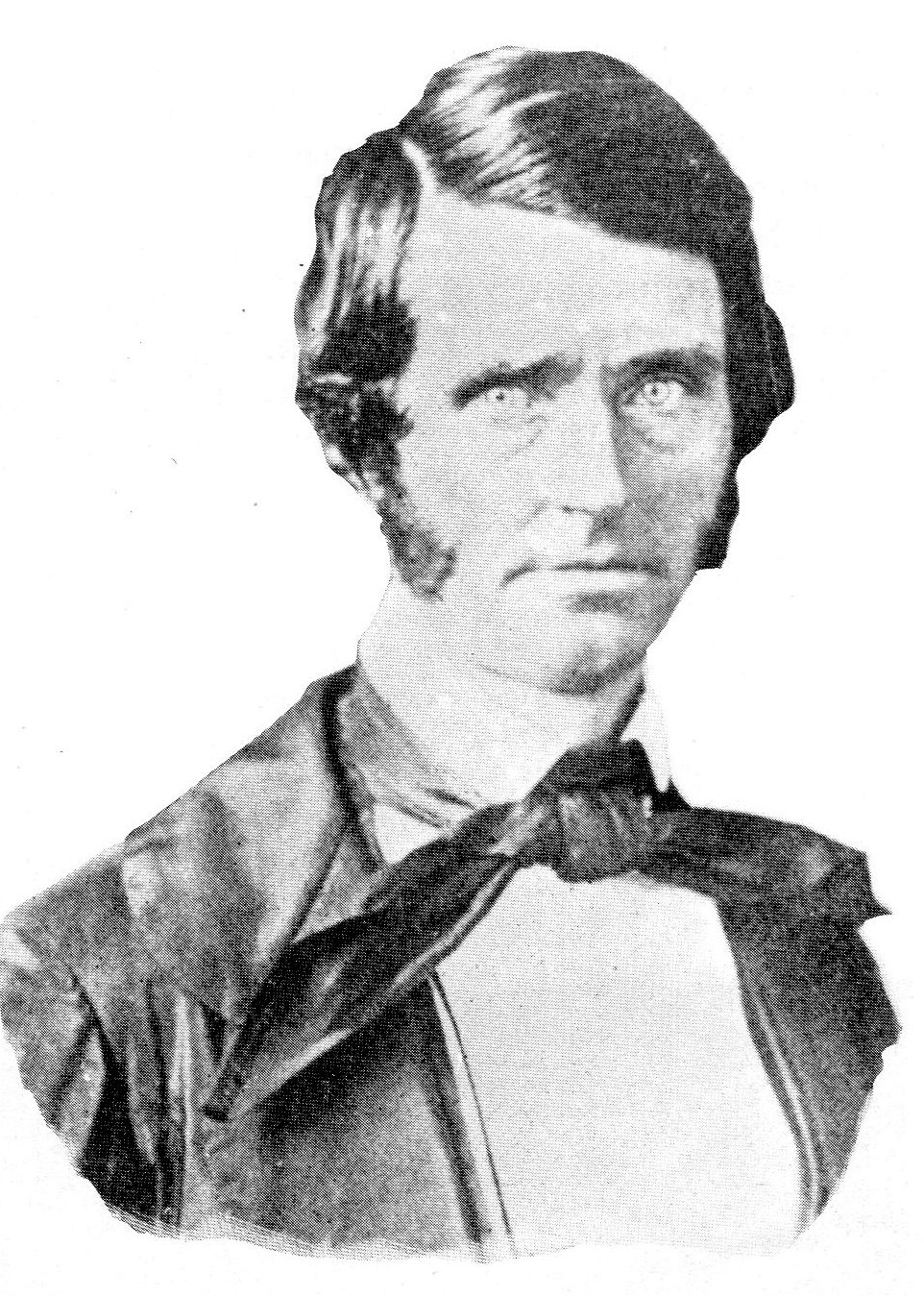

Member of the U.S. House of Representatives from Tennessee's 12th district
- In office March 4, 1837 – March 3, 1841
- Preceded by: Adam Huntsman
- Succeeded by: Milton Brown

Personal details
- Born: July 10, 1807 East Tennessee, U.S.
- Died: November 24, 1852 (aged 45) Memphis, Tennessee, U.S.
- Party: Whig
- Spouse: Martha Hamilton
- Children: Alice Ann Crockett Tharpe; Charles Walton Crockett

John Wesley Crockett (July 10, 1807 – November 24, 1852), was an American politician who represented Tennessee's 12th Congressional District in the United States House of Representatives. It was one of two districts his father, Davy Crockett, had previously represented.

== Biography ==
Crockett was born in eastern Tennessee on July 10, 1807, to David (Davy) Crockett (August 17, 1786 – March 6, 1836) and his first wife, Mary (Polly) Finley (1788–1815). He had one brother named William Finley Crockett and one sister named Margaret Finley (Polly) Crockett. He was educated in the public schools, studied law, and then was admitted to the bar. He began his law practice in Paris, Tennessee. He married Martha Hamilton and they had fourteen children.

== Career ==
Crockett held numerous local and state offices before being elected as a Whig to the Twenty-fifth and Twenty-sixth Congresses; he succeeded Adam Huntsman, the man who had defeated his father in the 1835 election. He served from March 4, 1837, to March 3, 1841. Crockett was next elected by the Tennessee General Assembly to be the attorney general for the ninth district of Tennessee, and served from 1841 to 1843.

In 1843, Crockett moved to New Orleans and became a commission merchant. He was also a newspaper editor, publishing the National from May 22, 1848, and establishing the Crescent around 1847.

== Death ==
After moving to Memphis, Tennessee, Crockett died there the same year on November 24, 1852, at age 45. He is interred at Old City Cemetery in Paris, Tennessee.

== Crockett family tree ==
David Crockett family tree
- Gabriel Gustave de Crocketagne m. Mademoiselle de Saix of France
  - Antoine de Saussure Peronette de Crocketagne (changed name to Crockett) (1643–1735) m. Louise de Saix (1648)
    - Joseph Louis Crockett born in Ireland (1676–1749) m. Sarah Gilbert Stewart (1680–1776)
      - William David Crockett (1709–1770) m. Elizabeth Boulay (1710)
        - David "the Elder" Crockett (1729–1777) m. Elizabeth Hedge (1730–1777)
          - William Crockett (1748–1846)
          - David Crockett Jr.
          - Robert Crockett
          - Alexander Crockett
          - James Crockett
          - Joseph Crockett
          - John Crockett (1753–1834) m. Rebecca Hawkins (1756–1832)
            - Margaret Catharine Crockett (c. 1778–1792)
            - Nathan Crockett (1778–1839)
            - William Crockett (1780–1840)
            - Aaron Crockett (1782–1835)
            - James Patterson Crockett (1784–1834)
            - David Crockett (1786–1836)
              - m. Polly Finley (1788–1815)
                - John Wesley Crockett (1807–1852) m. Martha Hamilton
                - William Finley Crockett (1809–1846) m. Clorinda Boyett
                - Margaret Finley (Polly) Crockett (1812–1860) m. Wiley Flowers
              - m. Elizabeth Patton (1788–1860)
                - Robert Patton Crockett (1816–1889)
                  - m. Matilda Porter
                  - m. Louisa A. Wohlford
                  - m. Lydia America Corley
                - Rebecca Elvira Crockett (1818–1879)
                  - m. George Kimbrough
                  - m. James Halford
                - Matilda Crockett (1821–1890)
                  - m. Thomas P. Tyson
                  - m. James Wilson
                  - m. Redden Fields
            - John Crockett (1787–1841)
            - Elizabeth Crockett (1788–1805)
            - Rebecca Crockett (1796–1819)

U.S. House of Representatives
Preceded by Adam Huntsman	Member of the U.S. House of Representatives from Tennessee's 12th congressional district 1837–1841	Succeeded by Milton Brown
