= William T. Haskell =

American politician (1818–1859)

Member of the U.S. House of Representatives from Tennessee's 11th district
- In office March 4, 1847 – March 3, 1849
- Preceded by: Milton Brown
- Succeeded by: Christopher H. Williams

Member of the Tennessee House of Representatives
- In office 1840–1841

Personal details
- Born: July 21, 1818 Murfreesboro, Tennessee, U.S.
- Died: March 12, 1859 (aged 40) Hopkinsville, Kentucky, U.S.
- Party: Whig
- Spouse: Sarah Paralee Porter Haskell
- Children: Shephard P. Haskell; William C. Haskell; Joshua Haskell; Viola Haskell; Anna Haskell; Mary Haskell
- Education: University of Nashville
- Profession: lawyer; soldier; politician

William T. Haskell (July 21, 1818 – March 12, 1859) was an American politician and a member of the United States House of Representatives for Tennessee's 11th congressional district.

== Biography ==
Haskell was born in Murfreesboro, Tennessee, on July 21, 1818. He was privately tutored, he attended the public schools of Murfreesboro, and he attended the University of Nashville in Nashville, Tennessee. He studied law, was admitted to the bar in 1838 and commenced practice in Jackson, Tennessee. He married Sarah Porter, in Henry Co., Tenn., Feb. 7, 1838. They had six children: Shephard P., William C., Joshua, Viola, Anna, and Mary.

== Career ==
Haskell was a soldier in the Seminole War in 1836. During the Mexican–American War, he served as colonel of the 2nd Tennessee Infantry Regiment. He worked as a lawyer in private practice.

In 1840 and 1841, Haskell served in the Tennessee House of Representatives. He was elected as a Whig to the Thirtieth Congress. He served from March 4, 1847, to March 3, 1849.

== Death ==
Haskell died in Hopkinsville, Kentucky, in an insane asylum, March 12, 1859 (age 40 years, 234 days). He was interred in Riverside Cemetery in Jackson, Tennessee. He was the nephew of fellow congressman Charles Ready. His widow was the first woman state librarian of Tennessee, appointed in 1871.

U.S. House of Representatives
Preceded by Milton Brown	Member of the U.S. House of Representatives from Tennessee's 12th congressional district 1847–1849	Succeeded by Christopher H. Williams
