= Milton Brown (politician) =

American politician (1804–1883)

Member of the U.S. House of Representatives from Tennessee
- In office March 4, 1841 – March 3, 1847
- Preceded by: John W. Crockett (12th); Cave Johnson (11th)
- Succeeded by: District eliminated (12th); William T. Haskell (11th)
- Constituency: 12th district (1841-43); 11th district (1843-47)

Personal details
- Born: February 28, 1804 Lebanon, Ohio, U.S.
- Died: May 15, 1883 (aged 79) Jackson, Tennessee, U.S.
- Party: Whig
- Spouse: Sarah F Brown
- Children: Alexander Brown; Milton Brown, Jr.; Lizzie Brown; Sarah Brown; Ella Brown; Balie Brown; William Stoddart Brown
- Profession: lawyer; judge; politician; railroad man

Milton Brown (February 28, 1804 – May 15, 1883) was a U.S. Representative from Tennessee.

== Biography ==
Brown was born in Lebanon, Ohio. After growing up, he moved to Nashville, Tennessee. He married Sarah F. Jackson on January 21, 1835, and they had seven children, four boys and three girls.

== Career ==
Brown studied law and was admitted to the Tennessee bar and began his practice in Paris, Tennessee, but later, he moved south to Jackson, Tennessee.

In 1835 Brown became a judge of the chancery court of west Tennessee and held this position until he was elected as a Whig to the Twenty-seventh Congress, representing the twelfth district. He served in that capacity from March 4, 1841, to March 3, 1843. Reelected to the two succeeding Congresses representing the eleventh district, he served from March 4, 1843, to March 4, 1847.

Brown was one of the founders of two universities: Southwestern Baptist University, which became Union University, and of Lambuth College, both in Jackson, Tennessee. He also served as president of the Mississippi Central & Tennessee Railroad Co. from 1854 to 1856, and as president of the Mobile & Ohio Railroad Co. from 1856 to 1871.

== Death ==
Brown died in Jackson, Tennessee on May 15, 1883 (age 79 years, 76 days). He is interred in Riverside Cemetery in Jackson.

U.S. House of Representatives
Preceded by John W. Crockett	Member of the U.S. House of Representatives from Tennessee's 12th congressional district 1841–1843	Succeeded by District eliminated
Preceded by Cave Johnson	Member of the U.S. House of Representatives from Tennessee's 11th congressional district 1843–1847	Succeeded by William T. Haskell
