= Isham G. Harris =

American politician (1818–1897)

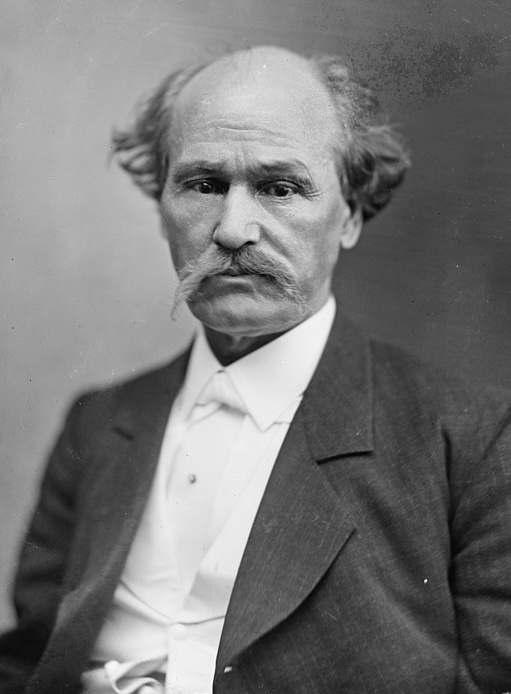
- Photograph of Harris by Mathew Brady, c. 1865-1880

President pro tempore of the United States Senate
- In office January 10, 1895 – March 3, 1895
- Preceded by: Matt W. Ransom
- Succeeded by: William P. Frye
- In office March 22, 1893 – January 7, 1895
- Preceded by: Charles F. Manderson
- Succeeded by: Matt W. Ransom

United States Senator from Tennessee
- In office March 4, 1877 – July 8, 1897
- Preceded by: Henry Cooper
- Succeeded by: Thomas B. Turley

16th Governor of Tennessee
- In office November 3, 1857 – March 12, 1862 (Note: This refers to the date that Andrew Johnson was appointed military governor. Harris continued issuing edicts as governor throughout the Civil War. Confederates elected Robert L. Caruthers as Harris's successor in 1863, but Caruthers never took office.)
- Preceded by: Andrew Johnson
- Succeeded by: Andrew Johnson as Military Governor

Member of the U.S. House of Representatives from Tennessee's 9th district
- In office March 4, 1849 – March 3, 1853
- Preceded by: Lucien B. Chase
- Succeeded by: Emerson Etheridge

Member of the Tennessee Senate
- In office 1847–1849

Personal details
- Born: February 10, 1818 Franklin County, Tennessee, U.S.
- Died: July 8, 1897 (aged 79) Washington, D.C., U.S.
- Resting place: Elmwood Cemetery, Memphis, Tennessee, U.S. 35°07′19.0″N 90°01′38.7″W
- Party: Democratic
- Spouse: Martha Mariah Travis
- Profession: Merchant, Attorney

Isham Green Harris (February 10, 1818 – July 8, 1897) was an American and Confederate politician who served as the 16th governor of Tennessee from 1857 to 1862, and as a U.S. senator from 1877 until his death. He was the state's first governor from West Tennessee. A pivotal figure in the state's history, Harris was considered by his contemporaries the person most responsible for leading Tennessee out of the Union and aligning it with the Confederacy during the Civil War.

Harris rose to prominence in state politics in the late 1840s when he campaigned against the anti-slavery initiatives of northern Whigs. He was elected governor amidst rising sectional strife in the late 1850s, and following the election of Abraham Lincoln in 1860 he persistently sought to sever the state's ties with the Union. His war-time efforts raised over 100,000 soldiers for the Confederate cause. After the Union Army gained control of Middle and West Tennessee in 1862, Harris spent the remainder of the war on the staffs of various Confederate generals. Following the war, he spent several years in exile in Mexico and England.

After returning to Tennessee, Harris became a leader of the state's Bourbon Democrats. During his tenure in the U.S. Senate, he championed states' rights and currency expansion. As the Senate's president pro tempore in the 1890s, Harris led the charge against President Grover Cleveland's attempts to repeal the Sherman Silver Purchase Act.

== Early life and career ==
Harris was born in Franklin County, Tennessee, near Tullahoma. He was the ninth child of Isham Green Harris, a farmer and Methodist minister, and his wife Lucy Davidson Harris. His parents had moved from North Carolina to Middle Tennessee in 1806. He was educated at Carrick Academy in Winchester until he was 14. He moved to Paris, Tennessee, where he joined up with his brother William R. Harris, an attorney, and became a store clerk. In 1838, with funds provided by his brother, Harris established his own business in Ripley, Mississippi, an area that had only been recently opened to settlers after a treaty with the Chickasaw Indians.

While in Ripley, Harris studied law. He sold his successful business three years later for $7,000 and returned to Paris where he continued studying law under Judge Andrew McCampbell. On May 3, 1841, he was admitted to the bar in Henry County and began a lucrative practice in Paris. He was considered one of the leading criminal attorneys in the state.

On July 6, 1843, Harris married Martha Mariah Travis (nicknamed "Crockett"), the daughter of Major Edward Travis, a War of 1812 veteran. The couple had seven sons. By 1850 the family had a 300-acre (120 ha) farm and a home in Paris. By 1860 their total property was worth $45,000 (~$1.28 million in 2024) and included 20 slaves and a plantation in Shelby County.

In 1847, Henry County Democrats convinced Harris to run for the district's Tennessee Senate seat in hopes of countering a strong campaign by local Whig politician William Hubbard. Anti-war comments made in August by the district's Whig congressional candidate William T. Haskell damaged Hubbard's campaign, and he quit the race. Harris easily defeated the last minute Whig replacement, Joseph Roerlhoe. Shortly after taking his seat, he sponsored a resolution condemning the Wilmot Proviso, which would have banned slavery in territories acquired during the Mexican–American War. In 1848, Harris was an elector for unsuccessful presidential candidate Lewis Cass. In May 1848 he engaged in a six-hour debate in Clarksville with Aaron Goodrich, elector for Zachary Taylor.

Harris was nominated as the Democratic candidate for the state's 9th District seat in the U.S. House of Representatives in 1849. After successfully tying his opponent to unpopular positions of the national Whig Party, Harris won the election easily. He spent much of his term attacking the Compromise of 1850, though he also chaired the House Committee on Invalid Pensions. Harris was re-elected to a second term, but after Whigs gained control of the state legislature in 1851 his district was gerrymandered, and he did not seek a third term.

== Governor of Tennessee ==
In 1856, Harris was chosen as the presidential elector for the state's at-large district, a position that required him to canvass the state on behalf of Democratic candidate James Buchanan. He largely outshined the district's Whig elector, former Governor Neill S. Brown. This campaign elevated Harris to statewide prominence.

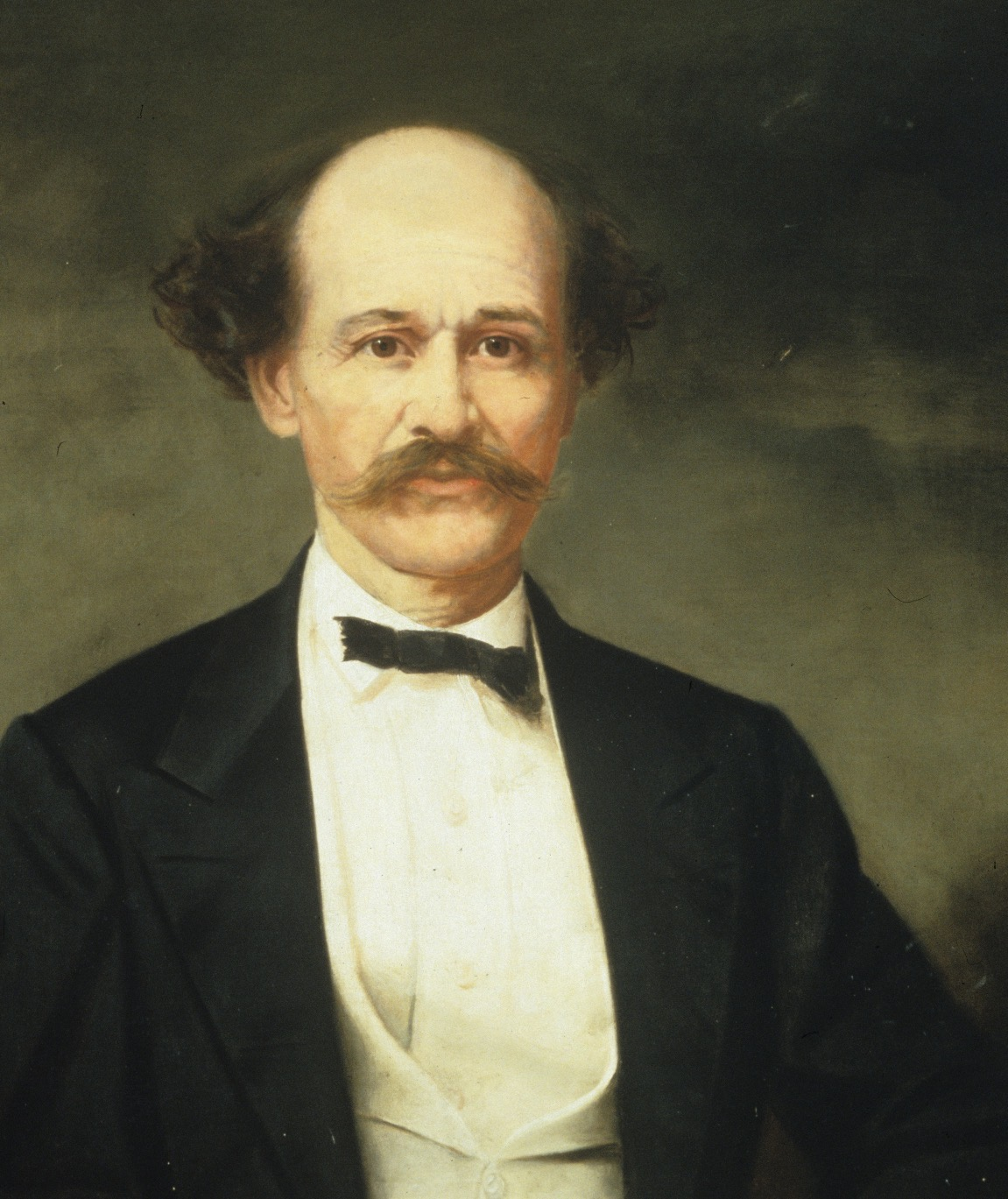
Portrait of Harris by Washington B. Cooper

In 1857, Tennessee's Democratic Governor Andrew Johnson was seriously injured in a train accident and was unable to run for reelection. Harris was nominated as his replacement and embarked on a campaign that included a series of debates with his opponent, Robert H. Hatton. With sectional strife in Congress fueling both campaigns, these debates were often heated, and fights frequently broke out among spectators (and in one instance between Harris and Hatton). Hatton was unable to distance himself from northern abolitionists, and Harris won the election by a vote of 71,178 to 59,807.

Harris's victory was not only the death knell for the state's Know Nothings, who had briefly risen to prominence following the collapse of the national Whig Party, but also represented a shift in Tennessee politics toward the Democratic Party. During the previous two decades, Whigs and Democrats had been evenly matched statewide, with Whigs controlling East Tennessee, Democrats controlling Middle Tennessee, and the two parties evenly split in West Tennessee. The nationwide debate over the Kansas–Nebraska Act and the Dred Scott case pushed the issue of slavery to the forefront in the mid-1850s, and the balance in West Tennessee was tipped in favor of the Democrats. Harris's 11,000 vote victory was relatively large, considering his predecessor, Johnson, had won by just over 2,000 votes in both 1853 and 1855.

In 1859, Harris ran for reelection against John Netherland, who had been nominated by a hodge-podge group of ex-Whigs, ex-Know Nothings, and disgruntled Democrats, known as the Opposition Party. Harris again campaigned on fears of northern domination, while Netherland argued that the U.S. Constitution provided the best protection for the continuation of slavery and thus it was in the state's interest to remain in the Union. On election day, Harris prevailed by over 8,000 votes. The Opposition Party, however, showed its strength by capturing 7 of the state's 10 congressional seats.

== Secession and the Civil War ==
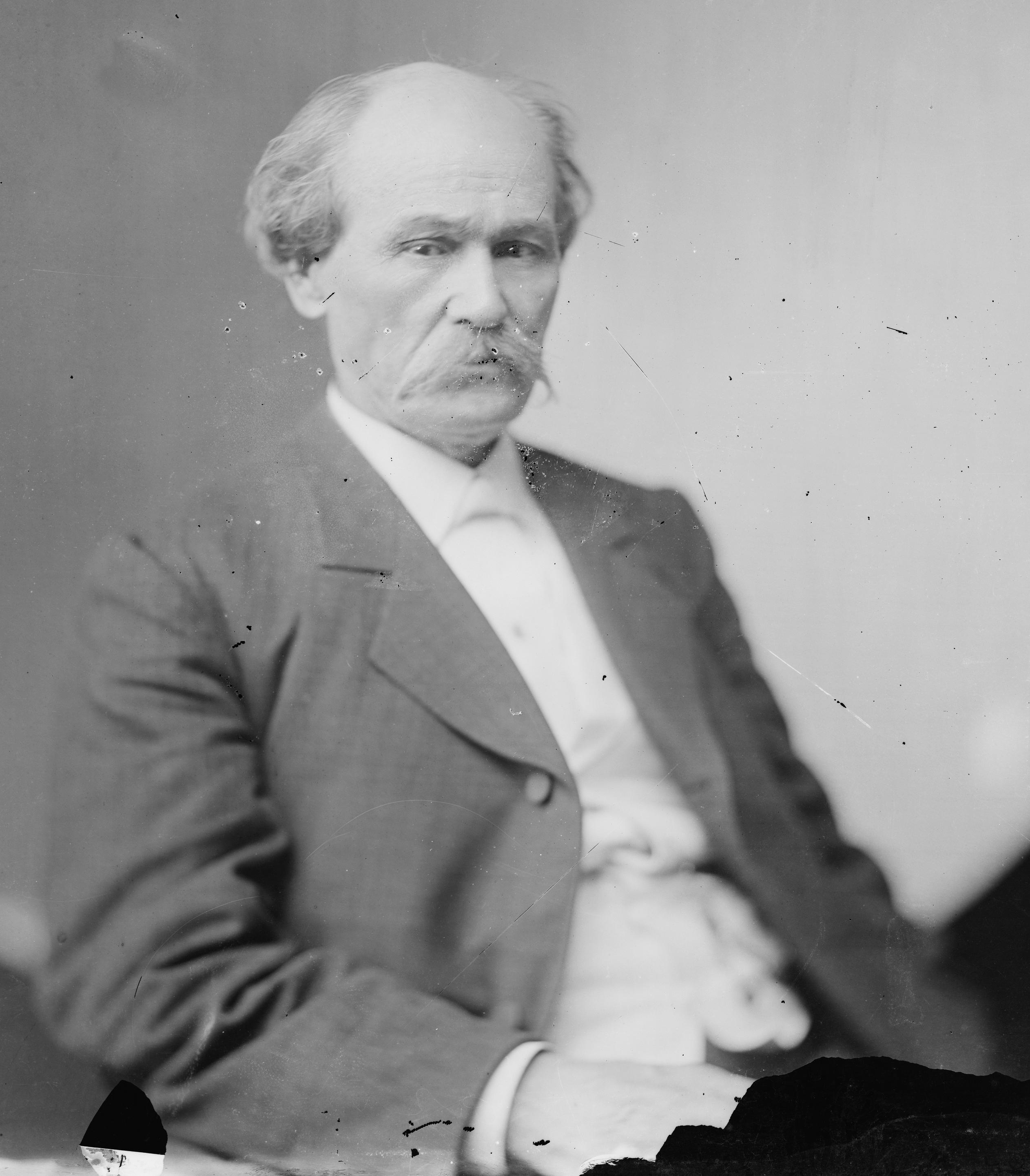
Harris, photographed as a member of General Albert Sidney Johnston's staff during the Civil War

Harris endorsed John C. Breckinridge for president in 1860 and warned that the state must consider secession if the "reckless fanatics of the north" should gain control of the federal government." Following Abraham Lincoln's election in November, Harris convened a special session of the legislature on January 7, 1861, which ordered a statewide referendum on whether Tennessee should consider secession. Pro-Union newspapers assailed Harris's actions as treasonous. The Huntingdon Carroll Patriot wrote that Harris was more deserving of the gallows than Benedict Arnold. William "Parson" Brownlow, editor of the Knoxville Whig, particularly despised Harris, calling him "Eye Sham" and "King Harris," and slammed his actions as autocratic. When the referendum was held in February, Tennesseans rejected secession by a vote of 68,000 to 59,000.

Following the Battle of Fort Sumter in April 1861, President Lincoln ordered Harris to furnish 50,000 soldiers for the suppression of the rebellion. Reading his response to Lincoln before a raucous crowd in Nashville on April 17, Harris said, "Not a single man will be furnished from Tennessee," and stated he would rather cut off his right arm than sign the order. On April 25, Harris addressed a special session of the state legislature, stating that the Union had been destroyed by the "bloody and tyrannical policies of the Presidential usurper," and called for an end to the state's ties to the United States. Shortly afterward, the legislature authorized Harris to enter into a compact with the Confederate States of America.

In May 1861, Harris began organizing and raising soldiers for what would become the Army of Tennessee. That same month, the Hillman steamboat, which was carrying a shipment of lead to Nashville from St. Louis, was seized by the governor of Illinois. In response, Harris seized $75,000 (~$2.05 million in 2024) from the customs office in Nashville. On June 8, 1861, Tennesseans voted in favor of the Ordinance of Secession, 104,913 to 47,238. A group of pro-Union leaders in East Tennessee, which had rejected the Ordinance, petitioned Harris to allow the region to break away from the state and remain with the Union. Harris rejected this and sent troops under Felix Zollicoffer into East Tennessee. In the gubernatorial election later that year, William H. Polk, brother of former President James K. Polk, ran against Harris on a pro-Union ticket but was defeated 75,300 to 43,495.

The Union Army invaded Tennessee in November 1861 and had gained control of Nashville by February 1862. Harris and the state legislature moved to Memphis, but after that city fell Harris joined the staff of General Albert Sidney Johnston. At the Battle of Shiloh on April 6, Harris found Johnston slumping in his saddle and asked if he was wounded, to which Johnston replied "Yes, and I fear seriously." Harris and other staff officers moved the general to a small ravine and attempted to render aid, but Johnston died within a few minutes. Harris and the others secretly moved his body to Shiloh Church so as not to dampen the morale of Confederate troops.

Harris spent the remainder of the war as an aide-de-camp on the staffs of various Confederate generals, among them Joseph E. Johnston, Braxton Bragg, John B. Hood, and P. G. T. Beauregard. Andrew Johnson was appointed military governor by President Lincoln in March 1862, though Harris was still recognized as governor by the Confederacy. In 1863, Tennessee's Confederates elected Robert L. Caruthers as a successor to Harris, but Caruthers never took office. Harris was still issuing edicts as governor as late as November 1864.

In the final days of the war, Harris and Mississippi Governor Charles Clark proposed to General Nathan Bedford Forrest that they stage a fighting retreat with Forrest's remaining cavalry forces into Texas and continue the war from there, which Forrest rejected. After the war, the United States Congress passed a joint resolution allowing the governor of Tennessee to offer a reward for the apprehension of Harris because he was "guilty of treason, perjury and theft". Brownlow, who had become governor, issued a warrant for the arrest of Harris and placed a $5,000 bounty on him. Brownlow taunted Harris in the warrant, stating, "His eyes are deep and penetrating—a perfect index to a heart of a traitor—with the scowl and frown of a demon resting upon his brow. His study of mischief and the practice of crime have brought upon him premature baldness and a gray beard." He further noted that Harris "chews tobacco rapidly and is inordinately fond of liquors."

Harris fled to Mexico, where he and several other ex-Confederates attempted to rally with Emperor Maximilian. After Maximilian's fall in 1867, however, Harris was again forced to flee, this time to England. Later that year, after learning Brownlow would rescind the warrant, Harris returned to Tennessee. Passing through Nashville, he called on Brownlow, who is said to have greeted him with the statement, "While the lamp holds out to burn, the vilest sinner may return." Afterward, he returned to Memphis to practice law.

== United States Senate ==
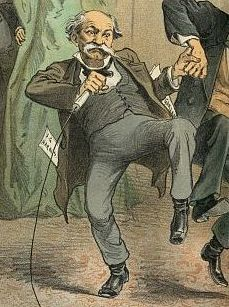
Caricature of Harris that appeared in Puck magazine in 1886

By 1877, the Tennessee state legislature, which was once again controlled by Democrats, elected Harris to one of the state's U.S. Senate seats. Over the course of his Senate career, Harris chaired three Standing Senate Committees: District of Columbia Committee (March 4, 1879 – March 3, 1881); Committee on Epidemic Diseases (December 12, 1893); and the Committee on Private Land Claims (March 4, 1895 – March 4, 1897). Additionally, Harris chaired the Select Committee on Epidemic Diseases from its formation on December 4, 1878 to its transformation into a Standing Committee on December 12, 1893.

During his first term in the Senate, Harris became the leader of Tennessee's Bourbon Democrats, a wing of the Democratic Party that generally supported laissez-faire capitalism and the gold standard. As such, Harris spent his early Senate career advocating strict constructionism and limited government, states' rights, and low tariffs. In 1884, he was interviewed by President-elect Grover Cleveland for a cabinet position. In 1887, he gave an impassioned speech in favor of the repeal of the Tenure of Office Act. In 1890, Harris denounced the Lodge Bill, which would have protected voting rights for African-Americans in the South, arguing that it violated states' rights.

Though a Bourbon Democrat, Harris, representing an agrarian state, was also a "Silver Democrat", believing pro-silver policies protected farmers. He supported the Bland–Allison Act of 1878, which authorized the federal government to purchase silver to prevent deflation in crop prices. He also supported the act's replacement, the Sherman Silver Purchase Act of 1890. In 1893, President Cleveland, concerned that the Sherman Act was depleting the U.S. gold supply, sought its repeal. When the vote came up in the Senate in October, Harris, as president pro tempore, launched a filibuster in hopes of preventing the act's repeal but was unsuccessful. Disgruntled over the repeal of the Sherman Act, Harris campaigned for unsuccessful presidential candidate and gold standard opponent William Jennings Bryan in 1896.

== Death ==
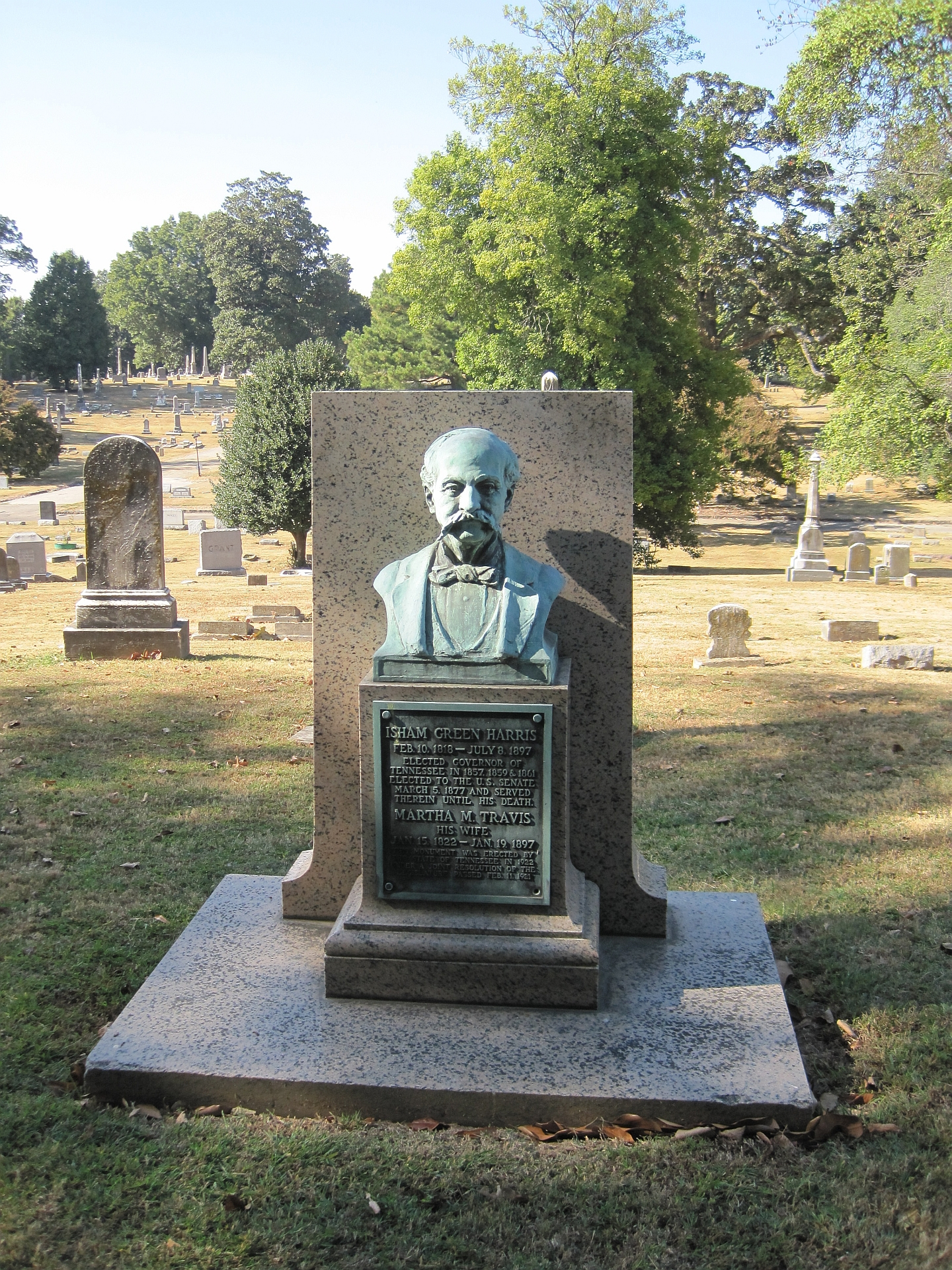
Harris's grave at Elmwood Cemetery in Memphis, Tennessee

Harris died in office on July 8, 1897. His funeral was held in the Senate chamber of the United States Capitol. Congressman Walter P. Brownlow, a nephew of Harris' old rival Parson Brownlow, was among those who delivered a memorial address in his honor. He is interred at Elmwood Cemetery in Memphis.

== See also ==
- List of governors of Tennessee
- List of members of the United States Congress who died in office (1790–1899)

== Notes ==
Party political offices
Preceded by Andrew Johnson	Democratic nominee for Governor of Tennessee; 1857, 1859	Vacant Title next held by John C. Brown
Political offices
Preceded by Andrew Johnson	Governor of Tennessee; 1857–1862	Succeeded by Andrew Johnson; As Military Governor
Preceded by Charles F. Manderson	President pro tempore of the United States Senate; March 22, 1893 – January 7, 1895	Succeeded by Matt Whitaker Ransom
Preceded by Matt Whitaker Ransom	President pro tempore of the United States Senate; January 10, 1895 – March 3, 1895	Succeeded by William P. Frye
U.S. House of Representatives
Preceded by Lucien Bonaparte Chase	Member of the U.S. House of Representatives from Tennessee's 9th congressional district 1849–1853	Succeeded by Emerson Etheridge
U.S. Senate
Preceded by Henry Cooper	Senator from Tennessee (Class 2); 1877–1897; Served alongside: James E. Bailey, Howell E. Jackson, Washington C. Whitthorne, William B. Bate	Succeeded by Thomas B. Turley
