= Tennessee's 11th congressional district =

- Obsolete district
- Created: 1830
- Eliminated: 1850
- Years active: 1833–1853

Tennessee's 11th congressional district was a district of the United States Congress in Tennessee. It was lost to redistricting in 1853. Its last representative was Christopher H. Williams.

== List of representatives ==
Representative	Party	Years	Cong ress	Note
District established March 4, 1833
Cave Johnson (Clarksville)	Jacksonian	March 4, 1833 – March 3, 1837	23rd 24th	Redistricted from the 8th district and re-elected in 1833. Re-elected in 1835. Lost re-election.
Richard Cheatham (Springfield)	Whig	March 4, 1837 – March 3, 1839	25th	Elected in 1837. Lost re-election.
Cave Johnson (Clarksville)	Democratic	March 4, 1839 – March 3, 1843	26th 27th	Elected in 1839. Re-elected in 1841. Redistricted to the 9th district.
Milton Brown (Jackson)	Whig	March 4, 1843 – March 3, 1847	28th 29th	Redistricted from the 12th district and re-elected in 1843. Re-elected in 1845. Retired.
William T. Haskell (Jackson)	Whig	March 4, 1847 – March 3, 1849	30th	Elected in 1847. Retired.
Christopher H. Williams (Lexington)	Whig	March 4, 1849 – March 3, 1853	31st 32nd	Elected in 1849. Re-elected in 1851. Redistricted to the 9th district and lost re-election.
District dissolved March 4, 1853
