= Tennessee's 12th congressional district =

- Obsolete district
- Created: 1830
- Eliminated: 1840
- Years active: 1833–1843

Tennessee's 12th congressional district was a district of the United States Congress in Tennessee. It was lost to redistricting in 1843. Its last representative was Milton Brown.

== List of members representing the district ==
Member	Party	Years	Cong ress	Electoral history
District established March 4, 1833
Davy Crockett (Crockett)	Anti-Jacksonian	March 4, 1833 – March 3, 1835	23rd	Elected in 1833. Lost re-election.
Adam Huntsman (Jackson)	Jacksonian	March 4, 1835 – March 3, 1837	24th	Elected in 1835. Retired.
John W. Crockett (Trenton)	Whig	March 4, 1837 – March 3, 1841	25th 26th	Elected in 1837. Re-elected in 1839. Retired to become attorney general for the ninth district.
Milton Brown (Jackson)	Whig	March 4, 1841 – March 3, 1843	27th	Elected in 1841. Redistricted to the 11th district.
District dissolved March 4, 1843
