= William Lewis =

William or Willie Lewis may refer to:

== Politicians ==
- William Lewis (MP for Anglesey) (by 1526–1601 or later), MP for Anglesey in 1553 and 1555
- William Lewis (MP for Helston), MP for Helston in 1584
- William Lewis (MP for King's Lynn) (died 1593), MP for King's Lynn in 1593
- William Lewis (MP for Cardiff), MP for Cardiff in 1601
- Sir William Lewis, 1st Baronet (1598–1677), MP for Petersfield, Breconshire and Lymington
- William Lewis (MP for Devizes) (1625–1661), MP for Devizes, 1660–1661
- William J. Lewis (1766–1828), U.S. representative from Virginia
- William Lewis (Australian politician) (1818–1895), businessman and politician of Kapunda, South Australia
- William Lewis (New York politician) (1827–1891), New York politician
- William James Lewis (1830–1910), physician and politician in New Brunswick, Canada
- William Lewis (Kentucky politician) (1868–1959), U.S. representative from Kentucky
- William Lewis, 3rd Baron Merthyr (1901–1977), deputy speaker of the House of Lords
- William E. Lewis (1918–1989), Missouri politician
- Bill Lewis (Australian politician) (William John Lewis, 1916–1991), Australian politician

== Sportspeople ==
- William Lewis (chess player) (1787–1870), English chess competitor and author
- William Lewis (cricketer) (1807–1889), English cricketer
- William Lewis (football) (1860–1916), association football referee, and secretary of Chelsea F.C.
- William H. Lewis (1868–1949), first African-American All-American football player and United States assistant attorney general
- William Lewis (athlete) (1876–1962), American hurdler in the 1900 Olympic Games
- Willie Lewis (boxer) (1884–1949), American boxer
- Ian Lewis (cricketer) (William Ian Lewis, 1935–2004), Irish cricketer
- Will Lewis (American football) (born 1958), American football executive and former cornerback
- Will Lewis (rugby union), Welsh international rugby union player
- Will Lewis (Australian footballer) (born 1999), Australian rules footballer
- William Lewis (figure skater), former Canadian figure skater
- Bill Lewis (American football coach) (William J. Lewis, born 1941), American football player and coach
- Bill Lewis (center) (William Glenn Lewis, born 1963), American football player
- Bill Lewis (baseball) (William Henry Lewis, 1904–1977), American Major League Baseball catcher
- Bill Lewis (footballer, born 1871) (William Jasper Lewis, 1871–?), English footballer
- Bill Lewis (footballer, born 1874) (William Lachlan Mark Lewis, 1874–1940), Australian rules footballer
- Bill Lewis (footballer, born 1921) (William Albert Lewis, 1921–1998), English footballer
- Billy Lewis (Scottish footballer) (William Lindsay Lewis, 1931–2015)
- Billy Lewis (footballer, born 1864) (William Lewis, 1864–1935), Welsh footballer
- Billy Lewis (footballer, born 1923) (William Lewis, 1923–2013), Welsh footballer

== Arts ==
- William Thomas Lewis (1748–1811), English actor
- Willard Louis (1882–1926), American actor who was sometimes credited as William Lewis
- Willie Lewis (jazz musician) (1905–1971), jazz clarinettist
- William Lewis (tenor) (1931–2026), American operatic tenor
- Willie Lewis (rockabilly musician) (1946–2014), American musician and founder of Rock-A-Billy Records
- Spliff Star (William A. Lewis, born 1971), American rapper
- Bill Lewis (William Lewis, born 1953), English artist, story-teller, poet and mythographer

== Scientists ==
- William Lewis (chemist, died 1781) (c. 1708–1781), English chemist and physician
- William Lewis (mineralogist) (1847–1926), professor of mineralogy at Cambridge University
- William Henry Lewis (chemist) (1869–1963), professor of chemistry at Exeter University
- William Lewis (physical chemist) (1885–1956), propounded collision theory
- William M. Lewis Sr. (1921–2010), fish biologist

== Businessmen ==
- William Lewis, 1st Baron Merthyr (1837–1914), Welsh coal mining magnate
- William Turnor Lewis (1840–1915), Wisconsin businessman and state legislator
- William D. Lewis (1792–1881), banker, merchant, and railroad executive
- William Lewis (journalist) (born 1969), former publisher and CEO of The Washington Post

== Other ==
- William Lewis (pirate) (fl. 1687-?), English pirate (possibly fictional)
- William Lewis (judge) (1752–1819), United States federal judge
- William Terrell Lewis (1757–1813), Tennessee businessman
- William Lewis (militia officer) (c. 1767–1825), American militia officer
- William Berkeley Lewis (1784–1866), confidant of Andrew Jackson and auditor of the U.S. Treasury
- William B. Lewis (New York treasurer) (c. 1816–1884), New York State treasurer, 1862–1863
- William Garrett Lewis (1821–1885), British Baptist preacher
- William G. Lewis (1835–1901), Confederate States Army officer
- William Draper Lewis (1867–1949), dean of the University of Pennsylvania Law School; founding director of the American Law Institute
- William Mather Lewis (1878–1945), president of George Washington and Lafayette Universities and government official
- William F. Lewis (1902–1964), Episcopal bishop
- Sir W. Arthur Lewis (William Arthur Lewis, 1915–1991), Saint Lucian economist
- Bill Lewis (judge) (William Wayne Lewis Jr., born 1978), American lawyer and judge
- William Lewis (archdeacon) (1692–1767), Anglican priest in Ireland
- William Yancey Lewis (1861–1915), American judge

== Companies ==
- William Lewis & Son Co., a Chicago-based orchestral string instrument company acquired in 1995 by Selmer

== See also ==
- Bill Lewis (disambiguation)
- William Louis, Count of Nassau-Dillenburg (1560–1620)
