= Alfred Balch =

American political advisor and judge (1785–1853)

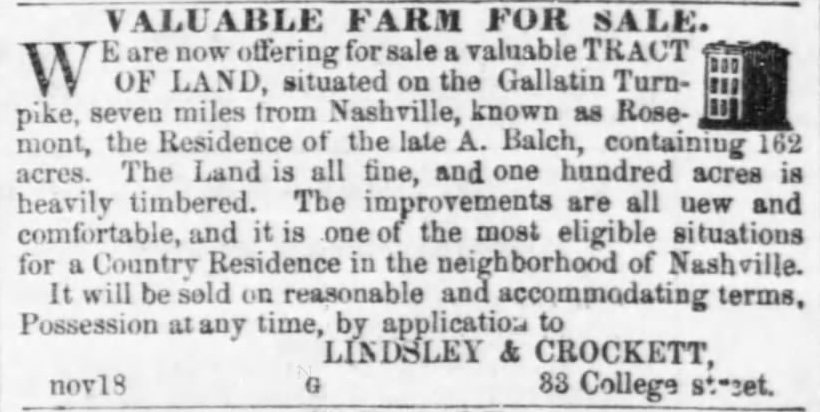
- "Valuable Farm for Sale" The Tennessean, December 17, 1854
- Born: September 17, 1785; Georgetown, Virginia
- Died: June 21, 1853 (aged 67); Rose Mont, near Nashville, Tennessee

Alfred Balch (September 17, 1785 – June 21, 1853) was an American businessman, lawyer, political advisor, and a judge in Florida Territory from 1840 to 1841. Born in Maryland, he moved to Nashville in the early 19th century and became friends with Andrew Jackson, later the seventh president of the United States. Through marriage he became one of a set of three brothers-in-law who served as political advisors during Jackson's presidency.

== Biography ==
Balch was the son of Presbyterian minister Stephen Bloomer Balch of Georgetown. He graduated from the College of New Jersey at Princeton, class of 1805. He was also awarded a Master of Arts in 1811.

According to a publication of the Williamson County Historical Society, Balch had "only recently been appointed Solicitor General for the newly formed Fourth Judicial Circuit, which included both Bedford and Williamson Counties," when the Magnesses shot and killed Patton Anderson, an associate of Andrew Jackson, in broad daylight on October 24, 1810, in Shelbyville, Tennessee. Apparently Balch was a "capable attorney, and during the Magness trials he became a close friend of Jackson."

In January 1812 married Mary Lewis, a daughter of Nashville tavern owner and investor William Terrell Lewis. His brothers-in-law thus included Thomas A. Claiborne, W. C. C. Claiborne, John Eaton, Isaac L. Baker (son of Joshua Baker), and William Berkeley Lewis. With Lewis and Eaton, Balch would become of Andrew Jackson's key political advisors. Mary Lewis Balch died within a year or so of the marriage. In 1816 he served on a committee registering grievances regarding the terms of a recent treaty with the Cherokee. Also in 1816 he was secretary and Thomas Claiborne president of a committee to encourage steamboat construction in Nashville. (This Thomas Claiborne was either another brother-in-law, Thomas A. Claiborne, or his late wife's first cousin, Thomas B. Claiborne, who were themselves cousins and scions of the Claiborne family of Virginia.) In 1819 Balch was one of many local notables to welcome James Monroe to the city.

Balch was a president of the Nashville Bar Association. He was a trustee of the Nashville Female Academy. In 1827 he advertised a sulphur spring near Nashville to health seekers. In March 1827, along with John Overton, Robert C. Foster, George W. Campbell, William L. Brown, John Catron, Robert Whyte, Thomas Claiborne, Joseph Philips, Daniel Graham, William B. Lewis, Jesse Wharton, Edward Ward, Felix Robertson, John Shelby, Josiah Nichol, William White, and John McNairy, he was a founding member of the Nashville Central Committee seeking to elect Andrew Jackson to the presidency of the United States.

In 1833 he was a candidate for the Tennessee state legislature. In 1836 he and Thomas Hartley Crawford were appointed to a federal commission to "inquire into the causes of the recent hostilities of the Creeks and the frauds alleged to have been committed in the transfer of their land reservations under the treaty of 1812." Balch reported that "whites, who bought the land surrounding the Creek reserves, killed much of the deer for themselves, or 'frightened them off to inaccessible swamps and morasses.' The Creeks continued crossing into Georgia to hunt, which often led to clashes with white residents."

Balch's second wife, Ann Newman Balch, died in 1838. In 1840 his son Alfred Newman Balch died at age 19 in Washington, D.C.

Balch was appointed by Martin Van Buren to be an associate judge court of appeals for middle district of the Territory of Florida, serving from 1841 to 1842. Shortly after arriving Balch wrote Van Buren that the "condition of this territory is deplorable. The leading men are divided into bitter parties and violence is the order of the day. Heretofore the Banking influence has been predominant, but now the most determined resistance is made to it and in fact it is tottering to its very foundations as well it may since the paper of the Union Bank here is 25 per cent below Virginia paper and Virginia paper is 8 per cent below specie." According to Florida historian James M. Denham, part of the strife was because the territorial council had recommended that the Florida banking system be dismantled.

In 1844 he participated in a public election-year debate over tariffs. In 1845 he offered for lease landings for boats on the Cumberland River at downtown Nashville. In 1849 and 1851 he wrote editorials encouraging investment in Tennessee internal improvements, namely railroads, specifically the Louisville, Nashville, and Columbia Railroad.

Balch died at Rose Mont plantation in Gallatin, Tennessee, on June 21, 1853.

== Sources ==
- Burford, Wm. B. (1890). Biographical Sketches of Rev. James Balch, William White and Their Descendants Brought Down to 1890. Wm. B. Burford.
- Balch, Thomas Willing (1907). Balch Genealogica. Allen, Lane and Scott.
- Denham, James (April 1990). "The Read-Alston Duel and Politics in Territorial Florida". Florida Historical Quarterly. 68 (4): 427–446. JSTOR 30150885.
- Denham, James (April 1995). "From a Territorial to a State Judiciary: Florida's Antebellum Courts and Judges". Florida Historical Quarterly. 73 (4): 443–455. JSTOR 30150483.
- Murphy, James Edward (1971). "Jackson and the Tennessee Opposition". Tennessee Historical Quarterly. 30 (1): 50–69. ISSN 0040-3261. JSTOR 42623203.
- Webb, Gary Alan (Spring 1984). "The Magness Trials" (PDF). Williamson County Historical Journal. 15. Franklin, Tennessee: 21–34.
