= Bill Lewis (disambiguation) =

Bill Lewis (born 1953) is an English Stuckist artist, poet, publisher and mythographer.

Bill or Billy Lewis may also refer to:

== People ==
- Bill Lewis (center) (born 1963), American football player in the NFL
- Billy Lewis Brooks (1943–2023), American jazz percussionist and flautist
- Bill Lewis (American football coach) (born 1941), American football coach with various college teams
- Bill Lewis (baseball) (1904–1977), American baseball player
- Billy Lewis (footballer, born 1864) (1864–1935), Welsh international footballer
- Bill Lewis (footballer, born 1871) (1871–?), English footballer with Small Heath and Leicester Fosse
- Bill Lewis (footballer, born 1874) (1874–1940), Australian rules footballer for Carlton
- Bill Lewis (footballer, born 1909) (1909–1949), Australian rules footballer for North Melbourne
- Bill Lewis (footballer, born 1921) (1921–1998), footballer for Blackpool F.C. and Norwich City F.C.
- Billy Lewis (footballer, born 1923) (1923–2013), Welsh footballer
- Billy Lewis (Scottish footballer) (1931–2015), Scottish footballer with Morton and Third Lanark
- Bill Lewis (Australian politician) (1916–1991), Victorian state politician

== Characters ==
- Billy Lewis II, a character on U.S TV soap opera Guiding Light, played by Jordan Clarke and Geoffrey Scott
- Bill Lewis III, a character on U.S TV soap opera Guiding Light, played by Renald White, Bryan Buffington, Ryan Brown, and Daniel Cosgrove
- Billy Lewis, a playable character from the video-game, Rage of the Dragons

== See also ==
- William Lewis (disambiguation)
