= Willie Lewis =

Willie Lewis may refer to:

- Willie Lewis (jazz musician) (1905–1971), American jazz clarinetist and bandleader
- Willie Lewis (rockabilly musician) (1946–2014), American rockabilly musician
- Willie Lewis (boxer) (1884–1949), American boxer

== See also ==
- William Lewis (disambiguation)
