= William T. Lewis =

William T. Lewis may refer to:

- Willie Lewis (jazz musician) (1905–1971), American jazz clarinetist and bandleader
- William Thomas Lewis (1748–1811), English actor
- William Turnor Lewis (1840–1915), Wisconsin businessman and state legislator
- William Terrell Lewis (1757–1813), Nashville businessman
- William Lewis, 1st Baron Merthyr (1837–1914), Welsh coal mining magnate

== See also ==
- William Lewis (disambiguation)
