= Isaac L. Baker =

American lawyer and politician (1792–1830)

- Born: November 14, 1792; Mason County, Kentucky
- Died: August 14, 1830 (aged 37); St. Martin Parish, Louisiana

Isaac Lewis Baker (November 14, 1792 – August 14, 1830) was a lawyer and state legislator in Louisiana, United States. He was an American officer during the War of 1812 and taken prisoner at the Battle of the River Raisin. He represented the Attakapas section of Louisiana in the state House of Representatives from 1819 to 1822.

== Early life ==
Isaac L. Baker was born in Kentucky. He was a son of Mississippi and Louisiana politician Joshua Baker, and a brother of Louisiana politician Joshua G. Baker, and through his sisters his brothers-in-law included Alexander Porter, John Ker, Dr. James Metcalfe, and Henry LeGrand Conner. He went to Transylvania University in Lexington where he was friends with Stephen Fuller Austin. After graduation, Baker worked in Henry Clay's law office. He kept up a correspondence with Andrew Jackson.

== Army service and War of 1812 ==
He served with the Americans in the War of 1812 and was captured at the Battle of River Raisin. General Winchester ordered him to organize the other prisoners at Sandwich.

He was transferred to the southern theater. His journal of July 1814 and August 1814 is an important primary source document on Andrew Jackson and the Creek War. He commanded the 44th Regular United States Infantry at the Battle of New Orleans.

== Politics ==
Isaac L. Baker served in the Louisiana state legislature. He was a member of Louisiana House of Representatives from Attakapas from 1819 to 1822. Preserved letters written by Baker, who was described by one historian as a " self-appointed political booster and informant," are used to study antebellum Louisiana state politics.

== Personal life ==
He married first Charlotte Lewis (a daughter of Nashville businessman William Terrell Lewis). Through Charlotte Lewis, his brothers-in-law included Thomas A. Claiborne, William C. C. Claiborne, Micajah Green Lewis, John Eaton, and William Berkeley Lewis.

He married second Margaret H. Crozier in Mississippi in October 1828.

== Sources ==
- n.a. (September 8, 2026). "Membership in the Louisiana House of Representatives, 1812 to 2028" (PDF). Baton Rouge: David R. Poynter Legislative Research Library, Louisiana House of Representatives.
- Arrowood, C. F.; Baker, Isaac L. (April 1927). "The Journal of Captain Isaac L. Baker". The Southwestern Historical Quarterly. 30 (4). Texas State Historical Association: 272–282. ISSN 0038-478X. JSTOR 30234970.
- Clift, G. Glenn (1938). "Kentucky Marriages and Obituaries (Continued)". Register of Kentucky State Historical Society. 36 (117). Kentucky Historical Society: 306–329. ISSN 2328-8183. JSTOR 23371657.
- Clift, G. Glenn (1961). Remember the Raisin! Kentucky and Kentuckians in the battles and massacre at Frenchtown, Michigan Territory, in the War of 1812. With a prologue by E. Merton Coulter. Frankfort: Kentucky Historical Society.
- Jackson, Andrew (1996). Moser, Harold; Hoth, David; Hoemann, George (eds.). The Papers of Andrew Jackson: Volume V, 1821–1824. University of Tennessee Press. pp. 11–12. doi:10.7290/utp7345. ISBN 978-0-87049-897-8.
- Tregle, Joseph G. (1945). "The Josiah Stoddard Johnston Papers". Pennsylvania Magazine of History and Biography. 69 (4). Archived from the original on 2015-06-14.
