= William Henry Lewis =

William Henry Lewis may refer to:

- William H. Lewis (1868–1949), African-American pioneer in athletics, law and politics
- William Henry Lewis (chemist) (1869–1963), professor of chemistry at Exeter University
- William Lewis (cricketer) (1807–1889), Welsh cricketer
- Bill Lewis (baseball) (1904–1977), American Major League Baseball catcher

== See also ==
- William Lewis (disambiguation)
