= John Vines Wright =

American politician and judge (1828–1908)

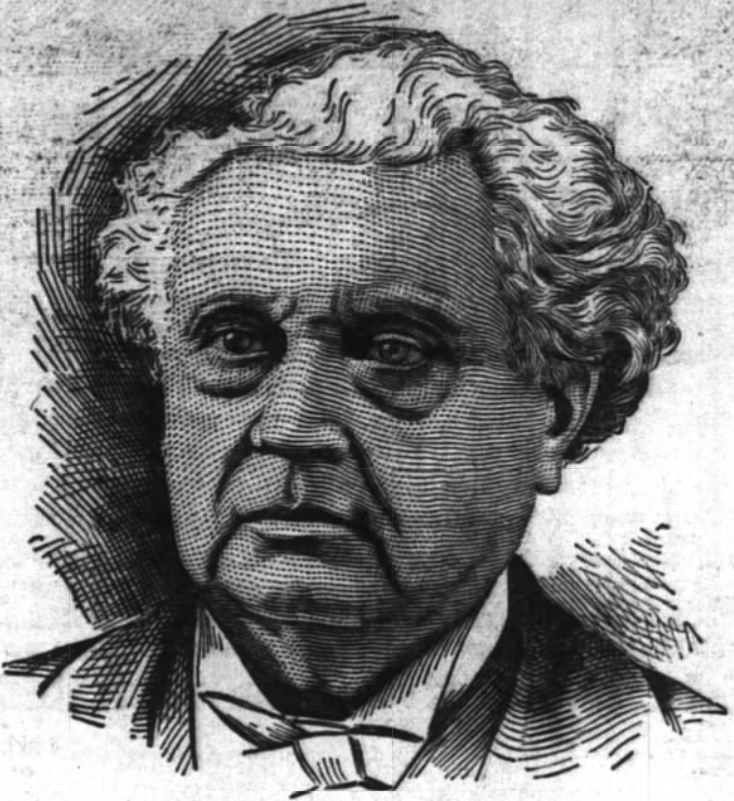
- Sketch of Wright in 1900

Member of the U.S. House of Representatives from Tennessee's 7th district
- In office March 4, 1855 – March 3, 1861
- Preceded by: Robert M. Bugg
- Succeeded by: Isaac Roberts Hawkins (1866) (Note: District inactive during the civil war)

Personal details
- Born: June 28, 1828 Purdy, Tennessee, U.S.
- Died: June 12, 1908 (aged 79) Washington, D.C., U.S.
- Resting place: Rock Creek Cemetery
- Party: Democratic
- Spouse: Georgia Hays
- Children: 3
- Relatives: Marcus J. Wright (brother)
- Education: University of Tennessee at Knoxville
- Occupation: Politician; military officer; lawyer; judge
- Profession: Lawyer; politician; judge
- Military career
- Allegiance: Confederate States of America
- Branch: Confederate States Army
- Rank: Colonel
- Unit: 13th Tennessee Infantry Regiment
- Conflicts: American Civil War; Battle of Belmont

John Vines Wright (June 28, 1828 – June 12, 1908) was an American secessionist, politician, military officer and judge. He served a member of the United States House of Representatives for the 7th congressional district of Tennessee and in the First and Second Congress of the Confederate States. He served in the Confederate States Army as a colonel. He later became a judge of the circuit court of Tennessee and a chancellor and judge of the Tennessee Supreme Court.

== Biography ==
John Vines Wright was born in Purdy, Tennessee, in McNairy County the son of Benjamin C. and Martha Ann Hicks Wright. He completed preparatory studies and attended the University of Tennessee at Knoxville, where he pursued courses in medicine and law. After graduating from the law department, he was admitted to the bar in 1852, and he commenced practice in Purdy. His brother was Marcus J. Wright.

Wright owned slaves.

== Political career ==
Elected as a Democrat to the Thirty-fourth, the Thirty-fifth, and the Thirty-sixth Congresses, Wright served from March 4, 1855 to March 3, 1861.

During the Civil War, Wright served in the Confederate Army as colonel of the 13th Tennessee Infantry Regiment in 1861. He was present at the Battle of Belmont where his horse was shot from under him. He was elected to both the First and the Second Confederate Congresses.

Wright served as a judge of the circuit court of Tennessee, and then as a chancellor and judge of the Tennessee Supreme Court. He practiced law in Nashville in 1885 and 1886. He was an unsuccessful candidate as an Anti-Repudiation Democrat for governor of Tennessee in 1880. He was chairman of the Northwest Indian Commission in 1886 and a member of the commission to treat with the Great Sioux Nation in Dakota. He was appointed to the law division of the United States General Land Office in 1887 and served until his death.

== Personal life ==
Wright married Georgia Hays and they had three children, Eugene, Georgia Hays, and Annie. His daughter Georgia Hays married Frank Lyon.

Wright died in Washington, D.C., on June 12, 1908. He is interred in Rock Creek Cemetery, Washington, D.C.

== Notes ==
U.S. House of Representatives
Preceded by Robert M. Bugg	Member of the U.S. House of Representatives from Tennessee's 7th congressional district 1855-1861	Succeeded by Civil War
