= Abram Maury Jr. =

American politician (1766–1825)

Abram Maury
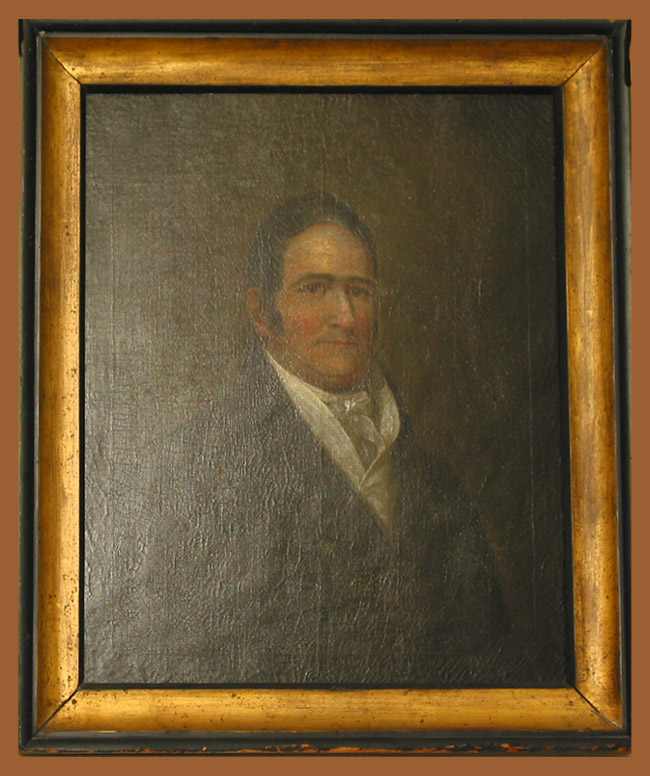
- Abram Maury by Ralph E. W. Earl (via Tennessee Portraits Project)
- Born: February 17, 1766; Lunenburg, Province of Virginia
- Died: January 2, 1825 (aged 58); Williamson County, Tennessee

Abram Maury Jr. (February 17, 1766–January 2, 1825) was a state legislator in Tennessee. Maury County, Tennessee is named for him. He is considered the founder of Franklin, Tennessee.

== Life and career ==
He was born in Lunenburg County, Virginia to Susannah Poindexter and Abram Maury. Because of the multiple Abrams Maury he is recorded as Maury Jr. in some documents and in others as Maury Sr.

He relocated from Virginia to Tennessee in 1797 where he bought 640 acres on Harpeth River. He traveled in company with "his wife and two daughters, his widowed mother, four sisters and his brother Philip." This was Davidson County when he bought it, later Williamson County. His plantation, which had a spring he called Abraham, was first known as Poplar Grove and later as Tree Lawn. His work included "farming, practice of law, and civil engineering." In 1798 "or early 1799," he platted the town of Franklin, "donating land for streets and public square," and was named one of the town commissioners following legislative incorporation of the town in 1799.

According to the University of Michigan Library guide to the Maury family papers, "After struggling with debt issues in Virginia, Maury purchased a tobacco plantation near Franklin, Tennessee. Between 1808 and his death in 1825, Maury speculated heavily, and successfully, in land and cotton production throughout the South (Alabama, Arkansas, Georgia, Louisiana, and Mississippi)."

He served as a member of the Tennessee Senate in the Sixth and 13th General Assemblies, representing Williamson, Davidson, and Rutherford from 1805 to 1807, and Williamson County in the first session only, September 20 to November 30, 1819. He resigned because he had been appointed to "The Commission to superintend the sale of land lately acquired by treaty from the Cherokee tribe of Indians."

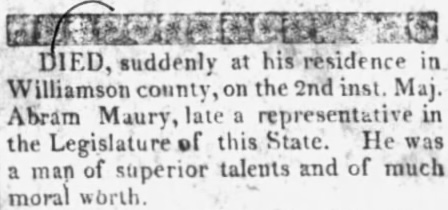
Obituary, Knoxville Enquirer, Knoxville, January 20, 1825

He owned 27 slaves in Williamson County at the time of the 1820 U.S. census. He died in 1825 and was buried in the Maury cemetery on the family plantation.

== Personal life ==
Abram Maury married Martha Worsham, daughter of Elizabeth Branch and Daniel Worsham, of Amelia County, Virginia. Their children were Elizabeth Branch Maury (m. John S. Reid), Matthew Maury, Daniel Worsham Maury, Abram Poindexter Maury, James P. Maury, Martha Fontaine Maury (m. Carey A. Harris), William Henry Maury, and Zebulon Montgomery Pike Maury. His son Abram Poindexter Maury of Williamson County served as a state legislator and congressman.

Maury Jr. was an uncle of Commodore Matthew Fontaine Maury.

== See also ==
- James Maury
- William Terrell Lewis

== Sources ==
- Davis, Louise (1999). "Abram Maury, The Founder of Franklin" (PDF). Williamson County Historical Journal. 30. Originally published in The Nashville Tennessean Magazine, October 3, 1948: 44–47. LCCN 86642787. OCLC 14186085.
- Little, Thomas Vance (Spring 1989). "Slavery in Williamson County" (PDF). Williamson County Historical Journal. 20. Franklin, Tennessee: 101–129. LCCN 86642787. OCLC 14186085.
- Robison, Dan M. (n.d.) [1971?]. "Maury". Biographical Directory, Tennessee General Assembly, 1796–1969 : [preliminary sketches]. No. 25: Williamson County. Nashville, Tennessee: Tennessee State Library and Archives. pp. 31–33 – via FamilySearch.
