= Meredith Poindexter Gentry =

American politician (1809–1866)

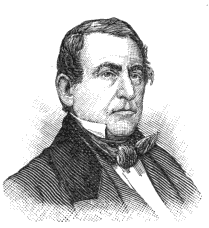

Member of the U.S. House of Representatives from Tennessee's 8th district
- In office March 4, 1839 – March 3, 1843
- Preceded by: Abram P. Maury
- Succeeded by: Joseph H. Peyton

Member of the U.S. House of Representatives from Tennessee's 7th district
- In office March 4, 1845 – March 3, 1853
- Preceded by: David W. Dickinson
- Succeeded by: Robert M. Bugg

Member of the Tennessee House of Representatives
- In office 1835–1839

Personal details
- Born: September 15, 1809 Rockingham County, North Carolina
- Died: November 2, 1866 (aged 57) Nashville, Tennessee
- Party: Whig
- Spouse(s): Emily Saunders Gentry, Caledonia Brown Gentry
- Children: Mary Gentry, Emily S. Gentry, Albert Gentry, Charles Gentry
- Profession: planter, lawyer, politician, orator

Meredith Poindexter Gentry (September 15, 1809 – November 2, 1866) was an American politician who represented Tennessee's eighth and seventh districts in the United States House of Representatives.

== Biography ==
Gentry was born in Rockingham County, North Carolina, the son of Watson and Theodosia Poindexter Gentry. He moved with his parents to Williamson County, Tennessee, in 1813. He completed preparatory studies, studied law, was admitted to the bar, and commenced practice in Franklin, Tennessee. He owned slaves, as did 40 out of 106 congressmen at the time he was a representative. He first married Emily Saunders, with whom he had two daughters, Mary and Emily. With his second wife, Caledonia Brown, he had two sons, Albert and Charles.

== Career ==
Gentry was a member of the Tennessee House of Representatives from 1835 to 1839. He was elected as a Whig to the Twenty-sixth and Twenty-seventh Congresses for the eighth district of Tennessee. He served from March 4, 1839, to March 3, 1843. Because of the death of his wife, he refused to be a candidate for renomination in 1842.

Again, Gentry was elected to the Twenty-ninth and the three succeeding Congresses for the seventh district, after the electoral districts Tennessee held had been reduced and reapportioned. He again served as a Whig. During the Thirtieth Congress, he was the chairman of the U.S. House Committee on Indian Affairs. He served from March 4, 1845 to March 3, 1853, and was not a candidate for renomination in 1852.

In 1855 Gentry was an unsuccessful candidate for governor of Tennessee. He lost to future U.S. President Andrew Johnson, who received 67,499 votes in the gubernatorial election. Gentry received 65,342 votes, leaving Johnson with a majority of 2,157. He retired to his plantation in Tennessee, where he remained until 1861.

Gentry served in the Confederate States Congress during the American Civil War. Though the Biographical Directory of the United States Congress lists him as a member of the Confederate House of Representatives during the First and Second Confederate Congresses, other sources list him as merely as a member of the First Confederate Congress during its first two sessions. The Journal of the Confederate Congress supports this view, listing him as having taken his seat on March 17, 1862, with his last appearance being near the day the second session ended, October 13, 1862. According to the Biographical Directory of the Tennessee General Assembly, he "may not have attended the 3rd and 4th sessions of the congress; was not a member of the 2nd Confederate Congress. He was captured in Middle Tennessee in 1864 and requested that President Abraham Lincoln send him south because of ill health; the request was granted."

== Death ==
Gentry died in Nashville, Tennessee on November 2, 1866 (age 57 years, 48 days), at Clover Bottom, the home of his sister-in-law Mary Ann Hoggatt. He is interred at Mount Olivet Cemetery.

Party political offices
Preceded by Gustavus Adolphus Henry Sr.	Whig nominee for Governor of Tennessee; 1855	Succeeded by None
U.S. House of Representatives
Preceded by Abram P. Maury	Member of the U.S. House of Representatives from Tennessee's 8th congressional district 1839-1843	Succeeded by Joseph H. Peyton
Preceded by David W. Dickinson	Member of the U.S. House of Representatives from Tennessee's 7th congressional district 1845-1853	Succeeded by Robert M. Bugg
