= David W. Dickinson =

American politician (1808–1845)

Member of the U.S. House of Representatives from Tennessee's 8th district
- In office March 4, 1833 – March 4, 1835
- Preceded by: Cave Johnson
- Succeeded by: Abram P. Maury

Member of the U.S. House of Representatives from Tennessee's 7th district
- In office March 4, 1843 – March 4, 1845
- Preceded by: Robert L. Caruthers
- Succeeded by: Meredith P. Gentry

Personal details
- Born: June 10, 1808 Franklin, Tennessee, U.S.
- Died: April 27, 1845 (aged 36) Murfreesboro, Tennessee, U.S.
- Party: Jacksonian, Whig
- Spouses: Eliza A. Grantland Dickinson; Sallie Brickell Murfree Dickinson
- Education: University of North Carolina
- Profession: lawyer; politician

David W. Dickinson (June 10, 1808 – April 27, 1845) was an American politician who represented Tennessee's eighth district in the United States House of Representatives.

== Biography ==
Dickinson, the son of David Dickinson and Fanny Noailles Murfree, was born June 10, 1808, in Franklin, Tennessee. After completing preparatory studies, he graduated from the University of North Carolina at Chapel Hill. He studied law, was admitted to the bar, and practiced law. Dickinson married Eliza A. Grantland, in Milledgeville, Georgia, on December 8, 1835. Eliza died in 1838. His second marriage was to Sallie Brickell Murfree, who was born in September 1821. .

== Career ==
Dickinson was elected as a Jacksonian to the Twenty-third Congress, which lasted from March 4, 1833, to March 4, 1835, and as a Whig to the Twenty-eighth Congress, which lasted from March 4, 1843, to March 4, 1845.

== Death ==
Unable to attend the last session of Congress due to his failing health, he died at "Grantland," his father's home, near Murfreesboro, Tennessee, on April 27, 1845 (age 36 years, 321 days). He is interred at the family burying ground at the estate. He was the nephew & son-in-law of U.S. Representative William Hardy Murfree.

U.S. House of Representatives
Preceded by Cave Johnson	Member of the U.S. House of Representatives from Tennessee's 7th congressional district 1833-1835	Succeeded by Abram P. Maury
Preceded by Robert L. Caruthers	Member of the U.S. House of Representatives from Tennessee's 7th congressional district 1843-1845	Succeeded by Meredith P. Gentry
