= Micajah Green Lewis =

American political aide (c. 1780–1805)

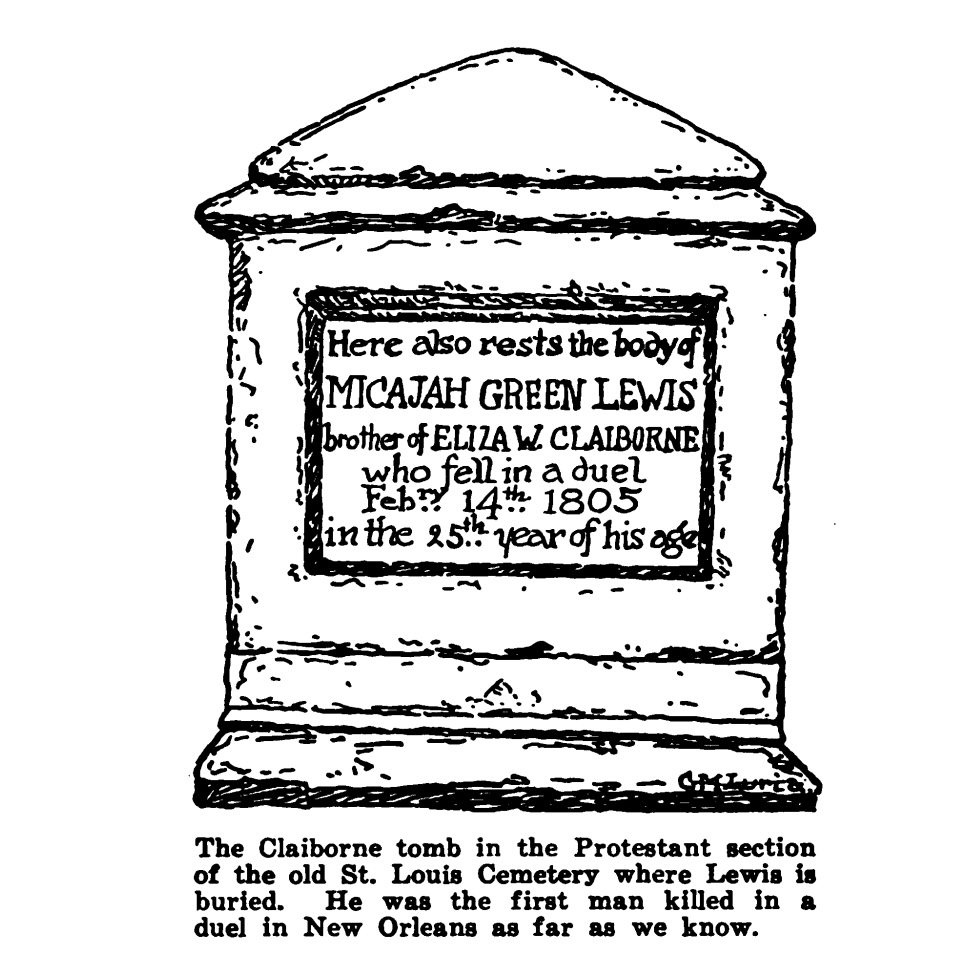
Image of Micajah Green Lewis's tombstone from Duelling in Old New Orleans

Micajah Green Lewis (b. c. 1780 – February 14, 1805) was an American political aide who was killed in a duel in New Orleans in 1805.

== Biography ==
Lewis was the son of an American Revolutionary War veteran and North Carolina state legislator named William Terrell Lewis. Lewis was born in Wilkes County, North Carolina in the early 1780s. His older sisters Sarah T. Lewis and Eliza Lewis married brothers, Dr. Thomas A. Claiborne, and William C. C. Claiborne (the latter of whom was a governor of Mississippi Territory and then Louisiana). Lewis grew up in Tennessee and went to college at Princeton University. After graduation, he went to work for his uncle Governor Claiborne. His 21-year-old sister Eliza Lewis Claiborne and her baby, Cornelia Tennessee Claiborne, both died of yellow fever in September 1804.

According to a history of dueling in New Orleans, the reason for the challenge that led to Lewis' death was a "a short article, A DREAM, written by Fidelis, and published in the Gazette of Feb. 8th. Lewis had called at the office of the Gazette to find out the identity of Fidelis, but they wouldn't tell him without 'consultation'. In the meanwhile, he learned from other sources that the author was Robert Sterrey whom Lewis immediately challenged, leaving no room for concession or compromise." The article suggested that Gov. Claiborne was out of mourning for his wife too early: "Methought it was a night in the month of December A.D. 1804. All in the city were hushed and still. I was passing near the Government House. Suddenly the sound of music burst from the hall. I listened the guests were dancing...The shouts of the guests seemed to pierce her soul. She clasped her hands in agony, then turned her eyes to Heaven she bent her willing steps towards the graves of Louisiana." Lewis challenged Sterry, and when they met, according to a newspaper account of the shootout, "The parties met and were to wait the count of 1, 2, 3, fire. But Lewis' pistol flashed at the word 'three', and he lost his chance to fire. Mr. Sterrey, seeing this immediately turned and fired backward in the air. No offer of accommodation was made, and the parties again fired at the same moment. Mr. Lewis received the ball which passed through his heart, and uttering the words, 'I believe', he fell a lifeless corpse." The Tennessee Gazette of Nashville said that Sterry was an "assassin" aligned with a man named Livingston, who had defaulted on $100,000 in "public monies," and that Sterry had engineered a public relations campaign against Claiborne's government, of which the "Fidelis" column was a part. The remainder of the two-column article was an extended paean to the character qualities of Lewis. The "Livingston" mentioned may be Edward Livingston who moved to New Orleans in 1803 after an embezzlement scandal in New York and "assumed leadership of a faction in New Orleans that opposed the first governor of the Orleans Territory, William Claiborne."

Lewis is buried near his sister and her baby in the Protestant section of the St. Louis Cemetery in New Orleans. Gov. Claiborne remarried in 1806, and that wife, the second of four, Clarice Duralde Clairborne, daughter of Martin Duralde, died in 1809 at age 21. When Lewis' brother-in-law and sister Thomas and Sarah Claiborne died back in Tennessee, future U.S. president Andrew Jackson became guardian of their son Micajah Lewis Claiborne, who had likely been named in honor of Micajah Green Lewis.

Lewis' opponent in the duel, Robert Sterry, was a graduate of Brown University and the son of Cyprian Sterry, who has been described as "most active slave trader" in Providence, Rhode Island in the 1790s. Sterry became an officer in the regular U.S. Army, retiring as a major, and was appointed to be an envoy to France. He died on the Helen, a ship returning from Bordeaux, during a winter storm off Southampton, Long Island in 1820.

== See also ==
- List of duels in the United States
