= Abram Poindexter Maury =

American politician (1801–1848)

Member of the U.S. House of Representatives from Tennessee's 8th district
- In office March 4, 1835 – March 3, 1839
- Preceded by: David W. Dickinson
- Succeeded by: Meredith P. Gentry

Member of the Tennessee House of Representatives
- In office: 1831–1832; 1843–1844

Personal details
- Born: December 26, 1801 Franklin, Tennessee
- Died: July 22, 1848 (aged 46) Franklin, Tennessee
- Party: Anti-Jacksonian; Whig
- Spouse: Mary Eliza Tennessee Claiborne
- Children: Martha Thomas Maury; Sarah Claiborne Maury; Mary Ferdinand Maury; Elizabeth James Maury; Josephine Maury; Abram Poindexter Maury Jr.; Septima Maury; Octavia Maury; Ferdinand Claiborne Maury
- Profession: newspaper editor; lawyer; politician

Abram Poindexter Maury (/ˈmʌri/ MURR-ee, December 26, 1801 – July 22, 1848) was an American politician, who represented Tennessee's eighth district in the United States House of Representatives. He was a slaveholder.

== Early life ==
Maury was born near Franklin, Tennessee, on the plantation of his father, Abram Maury Jr. After his preparatory studies, he became the editor of a newspaper in St. Louis, Missouri, at the age of sixteen. He next entered the United States Military Academy at West Point, New York, in 1820. He left the following year to pursue the study of law and edit a newspaper in Nashville, Tennessee.

== Family ==
In 1826, he married Mary Eliza Tennessee Claiborne (1806-1852), daughter of Sarah Terrell Lewis and Dr. Thomas Augustine Claiborne, whose family was politically well-connected in the South. They had nine children together, naming the seventh Septima and the eighth Octavia.

His father was a member of the Tennessee Senate and is the namesake of Maury County, Tennessee.

== Career ==
Maury was a member of the Tennessee House of Representatives in 1831, 1832, 1843, and 1844. He was admitted to the bar in 1839 and practiced in Williamson County, Tennessee.

Elected as a White supporter to the Twenty-fourth Congress by Tennessee's eighth district and re-elected as a Whig to the Twenty-fifth Congress, Maury served from March 4, 1835, to March 3, 1839. He was not a candidate for renomination in 1838.

Maury resumed the practice of law in Williamson County, Tennessee and also engaged in literary pursuits and lecturing. He served in the Tennessee Senate in 1845 and 1846.

== Death ==
Maury died near Franklin, Tennessee July 22, 1848 (age 46 years, 209 days) and was interred in the family cemetery at Founders Pointe near Franklin, Tennessee.

== See also ==
- John S. Reid, brother-in-law
- Carey A. Harris, brother-in-law

U.S. House of Representatives
Preceded by David W. Dickinson	Member of the U.S. House of Representatives from Tennessee's 8th congressional district 1835-1839	Succeeded by Meredith P. Gentry
