= Carey A. Harris =

American administrator (1806–1842)

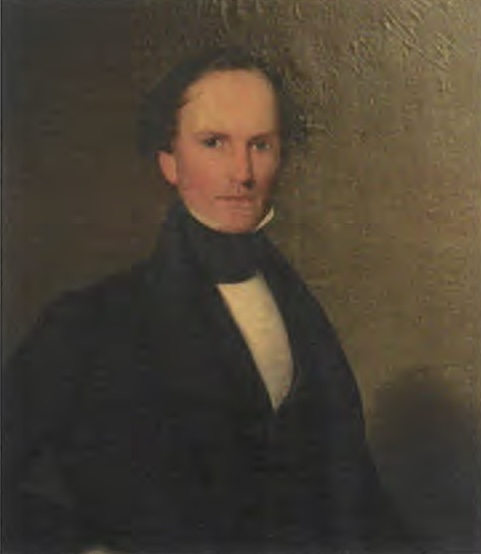
- Painted c. 1840 by Washington Bogart Cooper

2nd Commissioner of Indian Affairs
- In office July 4, 1836 – October 19, 1838
- President: Andrew Jackson; Martin Van Buren
- Preceded by: Elbert Herring
- Succeeded by: Thomas Hartley Crawford

Personal details
- Born: September 23, 1806 Williamson County, Tennessee
- Died: June 17, 1842 (aged 35) Franklin, Tennessee

Carey Allen Harris (September 23, 1806 – June 17, 1842) was a newspaper editor, lawyer, and U.S. government official during the Andrew Jackson administration. He was a native Tennesseean who was considered a "close friend" of Jackson. Harris served as Commissioner of the Bureau of Indian Affairs for a little over two years. President Jackson charged him with "rapidly and inexpensively completing Indian Removal". His administration of the bureau is predominantly recognized for neglect of Indian welfare during expulsion and deportation, profiteering on supplies, and for engendering widespread speculation on Native American land allotments and newly ceded land.

Martin Van Buren forced Harris to resign because evidence surfaced of his involvement in a scheme to speculate on Chickasaw land. Harris relocated from Washington, D.C. to Arkansas, where he became cashier, and then president, of the ultimately troubled Real Estate Bank. Harris died of tuberculosis in Tennessee in 1842 at the age of 35. According to historian Martin Case writing in 2018, "Of all the men who have served as commissioner of Indian Affairs, Harris was among the most corrupt."

== Early life and career ==
Harris was born in Williamson County, Tennessee, to parents from Rowan County, North Carolina. His father, Andrew Harris, died in 1812. He was a co-owner and editor of the Independent Gazette newspaper of Williamson County, Tennessee from "1821, when he was 15 years old" until its closure in 1824. He printed a music book called The Western Harmony in 1824. In 1825 he joined the Nashville Republican newspaper run by Abram P. Maury, son of his future father-in-law Abram Maury Jr. In 1826, they sold that newspaper to the official printers for the state. The Tennessean, which considered these titles part of their corporate ancestry, described them in 1934 as having been Andrew Jackson-aligned outlets. Harris became a lawyer in 1827, and in 1829 married Martha Fontaine Maury.

In the 1830s he relocated to Washington, D.C., where he became a clerk in the War Department under Lewis Cass and was soon promoted to chief clerk. He briefly served as interim Secretary of War. According to historian Ronald N. Satz, "unofficial correspondence between Harris and Cass indicates that Harris kept his superior well informed concerning patronage matters and other confidential subjects in addition to departmental affairs. Indeed, by the mid-1830s, Harris had become 'a member of Jackson's inner elite, and he had open access to the president'."

== Indian Affairs commissioner ==
Following Elbert Herring's resignation (at the request of the president), Jackson appointed Harris to be commissioner of the Bureau of Indian Affairs; Harris served from July 4, 1836, to October 19, 1838. Harris generally advocated for the removal of the southern tribes to the west. In regard to the Cherokee (ᏣᎳᎩ) removal known to history as the Trail of Tears, Harris "clearly communicated to Chief Ross in a letter dated March 27, 1838, that only 'a ready and cheerful acquiescence' by the majority National party would save the Cherokees from 'serious calamities'." He also supervised the miserable conditions of the Seminole (yat'siminoli) during removal, and among "the more sordid aspects of the commissioner's role in the Seminole removal operations were his efforts to expedite the process whereby white men with political influence in Florida Territory and neighboring states could obtain black slaves from the Seminoles...his directives facilitated their efforts to obtain slaves at the expense of their Indian masters."

Harris was partners with land speculators who were buying up Muscogee (Mvskokvlke) land and in doing so "cheated the natives...he had received loans from two of them amounting to one-half share in their company." When the Second Creek War broke out as a civil war and protest against the corrupt speculation, Cass "ordered the Creeks removed to the West as a military measure without the formality of a removal treaty. Harris then failed to protect these Indians from unscrupulous contractors who issued them insufficient and poor quality rations." His oversight of the removal of Chikashsha people from Mississippi was also plagued with profiteering and corruption. For Indigenous people already expelled and deported to the west, Harris advocated "American educators and missionaries could teach agriculture, mechanical trades, and Christianity...Indian schools were to enroll only those students whose parents had 'the power to influence the sentiment or the conduct of others favorably'." In the words of two American legal scholars writing about the American Army officers who managed Indian affairs at Fort Snelling, and there enslaved Harriet Robinson and Dred Scott, "Far from being an altruistic gesture (even within an ethnocentric world view that conceived of Western culture as the highest possible attainment of civilization), the educational goals of Harris and his contemporaries were closely linked to their need to control and domesticate Indian tribes." In 1837, Harris violated the government's purchasing policy for acquiring subsistence rations for the Indians being deported but he was defended by chief disbursement agent Richard D'Cantillon Collins, and there were no immediate consequences for the transgression. He was also "implicated in sleazy dealings with contractors who provided annuity goods to Indians in the Old Northwest."

Harris' erstwhile partner in land speculation, Thomas J. Porter, published this "Homo-Graphic Chart of the Settlements on the Mississippi River" in 1842 (Barry Ruderman Antique Maps)

In 1838, president Martin Van Buren came into possession of "evidence directly linking Harris to a scheme to speculate in Indian allotments in the South," specifically a partnership with Mississippian Thomas J. Porter that was seeking to buy Chickasaw lands. Van Buren demanded Harris' resignation.

== Arkansas banking ==
Jacob Brown and Harris's "tampering with the Chickasaw Fund netted at least $115,000 of Chickasaw money that was ultimately used to kickstart the Real Estate Bank of Arkansas." After leaving the Van Buren administration, Harris relocated to Arkansas where he became cashier then president of the troubled Real Estate Bank. He began as cashier in November 1838, and the "Enquirer of Richmond, Virginia, reported that his salary was the exact amount he had been making as commissioner of Indian Affairs and the highest of any other bank officer."

Rumors about Harris swirled in American newspapers in late 1838 and early 1839. One columnist wrote about allegations of widespread embezzlement of federal funds during the Jackson administration, mentioning the Swartwout–Hoyt scandal and "Gen. Gratiot," and mentioning that "public suspicion has fastened upon some individuals who were as high in General Jackson's confidence as Mr. Harris himself. It is well known that in several branches of the public service, the disbursing officers of the Government made it a regular business to speculate upon the specie funds sent to them." A New York newspaper commented:

Rumors are rife in Washington of extensive defalcations, by persons connected with the Indian Department. It is stated, that the annuities due some of the Indian tribes, have been charged as paid yearly and promptly, while the Indians have not received a dollar for three years. Mr. Carey A. Harris, who we see has been appointed Cashier of the Real Estate Bank of Arkansas with a salary of $3,500 per annum, is said to be a defaulter to a large amount. His friends deny this...It seems that the heads of bureaus have been allowed since Gen. Jackson came into office, to draw appropriations for specific objects, out of the Treasury, and deposite the money in bank to their individual credit, to be checked upon at their pleasure. It is not very wonderful under such a state of things, if the public money should be sometimes used for private purposes of the individuals having the control of it.

A Nashville newspaper defended Harris, alleged the Postmaster General was also known to be land speculator, and insisted, "We shall persist in our entire disbelief, that he has been guilty of any official delinquency, or that he resigned from any apprehension of being removed. As to the charge of having specalated in public lands, we suspect the truth to be, that Mr. Harris has purchased some two or three sections of the public land, not for the purpose of speculation, or selling again, but for the benefit of a young, and in case of his death, helpless family."

Banker Harris was based in Little Rock. According to historian Cody Lynn Berry of the University of Arkansas, "Because of his close ties to President Andrew Jackson, Harris was never prosecuted for his actions."

== Death and legacy ==
There is an 1841 letter from Harris in the Maury papers at the University of Michigan Library "discussing selling slaves named Lucy, Betsey, and a child for $1,550 Arkansas money." Harris died of consumption in Franklin, Tennessee on June 17, 1842, at age 35. The Arkansas Gazette wrote that "malice and slander" had driven him to an "untimely grave." He was buried in the Maury family cemetery in Williamson County.

According to historians, Harris is remembered for having "attempted to enrich [himself] through speculation in Indian lands." Another account characterizes his policy focus as commissioner as "treaties in the West, land cessions, land speculation, emigration of the tribes." Writing in 2020, DeJong described Harris' tenure as "unfortunate due to his avaricious nature and propensity to use his position to speculate on Indian contracts, in addition to his land speculation activities."

== See also ==
- John S. Reid, brother-in-law
- Abram P. Maury, brother-in-law and Congressman
- Steamboat Monmouth disaster – October 31, 1837
- Andrew Jackson and land speculation
- Timeline of the Andrew Jackson administration
- Salt Lick Reservation controversy

== Sources ==
- Davis, Louise (1999). "Abram Maury, The Founder of Franklin" (PDF). Williamson County Historical Journal. 30. Originally published in The Nashville Tennessean Magazine, October 3, 1948: 44–47. LCCN 86642787. OCLC 14186085.
- DeJong, David H. (2020). The Commissioners of Indian Affairs: The United States Indian Service and the Making of Federal Indian Policy, 1824 to 2017. The University of Utah Press. doi:10.1353/book77411. ISBN 978-1-60781-772-7. JSTOR jj.33676913.
- Satz, Ronald N. (1979). "Carey Allen Harris, 1836–38". In Kvasnicka, Robert M.; Viola, Herman J. (eds.). The Commissioners of Indian Affairs, 1824–1977. Lincoln: University of Nebraska Press. pp. 17–22. ISBN 978-0-8032-2700-2 – via Internet Archive.
