= Robert Renfro =

Tennessee tavern keeper (1760s–1816)

Robert Renfro (c. 1760s – after January 1816), known as "Black Bob", was an enslaved-born African American tavern keeper, innkeeper, and entrepreneur prior to 1797 in Nashville, Tennessee. He is generally regarded as Tennessee's first Black entrepreneur and the operator of Nashville's first known Black-owned business, Black Bob's Tavern, which he opened under court license in January 16, 1794 while still enslaved. He was emancipated by a special act of the Tennessee General Assembly on November 10, 1801, and required by that act to take the surname Renfro. After emancipation he operated a House of Entertainment, an inn, and a livery stable on the north side of Nashville's Public Square under the sign of the Cross Keys, drawing the patronage of attorneys and politicians, including Andrew Jackson. Renfro is documented in approximately twenty-five surviving records dated from 1792 to 1816, after which he disappears from the historical record.

== Early life and the Donelson voyage ==
Renfro arrived in the Cumberland country as an enslaved member of a party led by Joseph Renfro, who has been described as a kinsman of Moses Renfro, leader of one of the boats in John Donelson's 1779–1780 river voyage to the Cumberland settlement that founded Nashville. On April 12, 1780, the Renfro group separated from the main Donelson flotilla at the mouth of the Red River near present-day Clarksville, Tennessee, and established Renfro's Station in what is now Montgomery County. Indian attacks soon drove the settlers from the station, and Joseph Renfro was killed in an engagement near present-day Coopertown that came to be known as the Battle Creek Massacre.

== Years of contested ownership ==
Bob first appears in the official record on August 8, 1792, when Olive Renfro (by then remarried as Olive Shaw) sold him in what appears to have been a multi-party transaction. He passed into the ownership of Josiah Love, a Davidson County resident whose financial difficulties became entangled in a series of lawsuits in which the Nashville attorney Andrew Jackson represented Love. One foreclosure action listed Bob as Love's only asset.

A subsequent dispute over Bob's ownership arose between two prominent Nashville figures, the attorney Robert Searcy, a nephew by marriage of land speculator Richard Henderson, and Elijah Robertson. The two men submitted the contest to the Davidson County Court, which in November 1795 ruled in Searcy's favor.

While the ownership dispute was still pending, the Davidson County Court took the unusual step on January 16, 1794, of resolving "that a certain Negro called Bobb [sic] in the town of Nashville be permitted to sell Liquor and Victuals." This authorization is generally regarded as the founding of Black Bob's Tavern, an establishment that contemporary sources locate on what is now Third Avenue, just south of the Public Square.

Black Bob appears several times in the account books of Andrew Jackson's store in 1795:

- 2 pieces nankin for £24
- £5 for three handkerchiefs (entry annotated "paid Negro George for you")
- 4 shillings for "1/2 Doz. Spoons"
- 4 shillings for a pint of wine
- £34 for "1/4 yd Cambrick"
- 43 shillings for Hyson tea, knives & forks, 1 lb. Chocolate, £24
- £24 for 3 Pr cotton hoes
- £6 for 3 yds linen

== Black Bob's Tavern ==
The court-licensed establishment quickly became one of Nashville's most patronized houses of entertainment. Surviving records show it drawing the regular patronage of lawyers and politicians, including Andrew Jackson, future Tennessee governor Archibald Roane, and judge David Campbell.

In April 1800, a Nashville schoolmaster named Anderson Lavender assaulted Bob at the tavern. The Davidson County Grand Jury indicted Lavender for the assault, an outcome that legal historians regard as significant because it represented one of the rare instances in which a white man was indicted, rather than having the case dismissed at the outset, for an assault upon an enslaved person. Lavender ultimately agreed to pay court costs, after which the case was dissolved. Andrew Jackson, Archibald Roane, and David Campbell were among the judges who heard related matters during the period.

Robert Renfro advertised for renting part of Nashville city Lot No. 35 on June 28, 1814 in the Nashville Whig.

== Emancipation by act of the General Assembly ==
By 1801, Robert Searcy concluded that the profits Bob had generated through the tavern more than reimbursed Searcy for his original purchase price, and Searcy agreed to free him. In Tennessee, however, private manumission alone did not confer full legal freedom: a separate legislative act was required for the General Assembly to recognize the change in status.

Fifty-three of Nashville's most prominent and influential citizens (one of whom contemporary accounts suggest may have been a woman) signed a petition to the General Assembly requesting that Bob be emancipated and granted "all the privileges that is [sic] usual to persons in a similar situation." On November 10, 1801, the Fourth General Assembly of the State of Tennessee adopted Chapter XCIII, "An ACT to emancipate and set free a negro man, named Bob," which declared "that the said negro man, Bob, shall be, and he is hereby emancipated and forever set free, to all intents and purposes whatever, and shall in future be known by the name of Robert Renfro." The act was signed by William Dickson, Speaker of the House of Representatives, and James White, Speaker of the Senate.

The petition itself remains held by the Tennessee State Library and Archives among the papers of the Fourth General Assembly under Chapter XCIII; the full list of signatories has not been published in any indexed or digitized format. The first signer of the petition was Richard Cross, a Davidson County planter and the son-in-law of Judge William Maclin III, whose plantation adjoined the Public Square where Renfro operated his business. Both Richard Cross and Robert Renfro opened new taverns on Main Street as advertised in newspapers in 1801.

== Post-emancipation career ==
In 1802, Robert Renfro opened a new House of Entertainment on Main Street (now Second Avenue). He subsequently purchased a life estate in Lot No. 25 on Main Street from Robert Searcy and built and operated his tavern there until a fire destroyed the establishment in 1814. After the fire he rented and operated "the stone tavern on the public square, near the courthouse," which had previously been occupied by Timothy Demumbruen.

Renfro advertised his establishment in the Nashville press of the period. By 1808 he was operating "at the sign of the Eagle," and by 1812 he had adopted the sign of the Cross Keys, posting an advertisement in the Democratic Clarion and Tennessee Gazette on September 1, 1812, in which he noted that he had been in the entertainment business for fifteen to twenty years and offered board for man and horse at five dollars per week. Although the Cross Keys is a traditional English tavern device, several historians have noted that the choice resonates with Renfro's documented relationship to the Cross family of Davidson County, which had led the petition for his emancipation.

Renfro repeatedly entered Tennessee courts as a litigant before all-white juries, prevailing in at least three suits. In 1805 he sued Charles Dickinson in a breach-of-contract action before the Superior Court of Law and Equity; Dickinson was killed the following year in a duel with Andrew Jackson.

In 1812, the year of the United States' declaration of war on Great Britain, Renfro enrolled as number 954 on the muster roll of Captain Cloyd's militia company in Davidson County, becoming a free Black man bearing arms during the War of 1812 mobilization. He also appeared on the Davidson County tax list for that year. A December 1812 fire report in the Democratic Clarion and Tennessee Gazette noted that a fire had broken out at a stable belonging to Robert Renfro.

== Disappearance from the record ==
The last known record mentioning Robert Renfro is dated January 1816. By 1819, Robert Searcy is recorded purchasing Lot No. 25 with no mention of Renfro, and Renfro does not appear in the 1820 United States Census of Nashville or in the city's resurvey of that year. No record of his death has been located.

== Significance ==
Renfro has been described by historians of early Nashville as Tennessee's first Black entrepreneur and the proprietor of the first known Black-owned hotel in Nashville. His career has been used by historians to illustrate the distinctive character of frontier slavery in pre-cotton Tennessee, where enslaved people sometimes operated commercial establishments under court supervision, and the manner in which information, capital, and people moved through Nashville's overlapping kinship networks during the period.

A Tennessee Historical Commission marker commemorating Renfro and his tavern stands on the north side of Nashville's Public Square in downtown Nashville.

== In literature ==
Larry Michael Ellis, a Nashville author and historian who has written extensively on Renfro, published Spizzerinctum: The Life and Legend of Robert "Black Bob" Renfro in 2004 (AuthorHouse). Although the book is presented as a novel based on historical fact, its appended documentary chronology has been used by subsequent researchers as a finding aid for the surviving primary records of Renfro's life. Ellis also authored an essay on Renfro that was reprinted in theNashville Historical Newsletter and in From Knickers to Body Stockings, a 2006 collection of newsletter essays edited by Kathy B. Lauder and Mike Slate.

== See also ==
- Early hotels of Nashville, Tennessee

== Sources ==
- Jackson, Andrew (1980). Smith, Sam; Owsley, Harriet (eds.). The Papers of Andrew Jackson: Volume I, 1770–1803. University of Tennessee Press. doi:10.7290/utp7943. ISBN 978-0-87049-219-8.
