= Robert M. Bugg =

American politician

Robert Malone Bugg

Member of the U.S. House of Representatives from Tennessee's 7th district
- In office March 4, 1853 – March 3, 1855
- Preceded by: Meredith P. Gentry
- Succeeded by: John V. Wright

Member of the Tennessee House of Representatives
- In office 1851–1852

Personal details
- Born: January 20, 1805 Boydton, Virginia
- Died: February 18, 1887 (aged 82) Lynnville, Tennessee
- Party: Whig
- Spouse: Martha Patsy Laird Bugg
- Children: Ann Mariah Bugg; Zachariah Pennington Bugg; John Laird Bugg; Sarah Elizabeth Bugg; Robert Malone Bugg; Henry Martin Bugg; Samantha Bugg; George Booth Bugg; Martha Mildred Bugg
- Profession: teacher; farmer; politician

Robert Malone Bugg (1805–1887) was an American politician and a member of the United States House of Representatives for Tennessee's 7th congressional district.

== Biography ==
Bugg was born in Boydton, Virginia in Mecklenburg County on January 20, 1805, the son of John and Sarah Malone Bugg. He attended public schools. He married Martha Patsy Laird, and they had nine children, Ann Mariah, Zachariah Pennington, John Laird, Sarah Elizabeth, Robert Malone, Henry Martin, Samantha, George Booth, and Martha Mildred.

== Career ==
Bugg moved to Tennessee, and settled in Williamson County in 1825, where he taught school for several years. He then moved to Giles County and engaged in agricultural pursuits. He was a justice of the peace in 1840. He served as a member of the Tennessee House of Representatives in 1851 and 1852.

Elected as a Whig to the Thirty-third Congress, Bugg served from March 4, 1853 to March 3, 1855, but he declined to be a candidate for renomination in 1854. He resumed agricultural pursuits, and served in the Tennessee Senate in 1871 and 1872.

== Death ==
Bugg died in Lynnville, Tennessee in Giles County on February 18, 1887 (age 82 years, 29 days). He is interred at McLaurine Cemetery near Lynnville, Tennessee.

U.S. House of Representatives
Preceded by Meredith P. Gentry	Member of the U.S. House of Representatives from Tennessee's 7th congressional district 1853–1855	Succeeded by John V. Wright
