= Joshua Baker (Mississippi politician) =

Territorial council (1763–1816)

- Born: March 11, 1763; Frederick County, Virginia
- Died: April 14, 1816 (aged 53); Nashville, Tennessee

Joshua Baker (March 11, 1763 – April 14, 1816), often called Col. Baker, was an American soldier, "Kaintuck" boatman, merchant, slave trader, and politician. In the late 18th century he fought Indians in pioneer Kentucky and Tennessee, and the Northwest Territory, and participated in the 1799 Kentucky constitutional convention. By 1800 he was a flatboat man and slave trader, toting goods, livestock, and people down the Mississippi River to New Orleans and Natchez markets. He was robbed by a famous highwayman on one return trip up the Natchez Trace. At the time of the Burr conspiracy, the acting territorial governor assigned him to reoccupy Fort Adams with a small force and lie in wait for Aaron Burr's flotilla. He served on the Mississippi territorial legislative council from 1806 to 1809, and eventually got into a feud with the territorial governor Robert Williams. He relocated to the Attakapas district of Louisiana around 1810 and had a plantation there. He was a Louisiana state representative in 1812. He led a Louisiana militia regiment and fought alongside John Coffee at the Battle of New Orleans. Baker died suddenly in Nashville in 1816.

== Biography ==
Baker was said to have been born in Frederick County, British province of Virginia, in 1763. Another account has it that he was from Berkeley County, Virginia.

According to his obituary he fought in the American Revolutionary War. He reportedly "commanded General Wayne's spy company of the Kentucky troops in 1794" in the Northwest Territory. He seems to have had a busy life and ranged all over the frontier. According to the historical society of Rutherford County, Tennessee, "He was a defender of forts and stations and was at Strodes Station's [in Clark County, Kentucky] at the siege of March 1, 1781. He was on the 1787 Davidson Co. tax roll. He was found on the 1810 & 1820 census of Rutherford Co." He was said to be involved with the early military history of Mason County, Kentucky, where he married Susannah Lewis in June 1790. He was a delegate to the 1799 Kentucky constitutional convention from Mason County along with Philemon Thomas and Thomas Marshall, the latter being a younger brother of Chief Justice John Marshall.

According to one source in 1800 he was responsible for the construction of the first (no doubt log-built) version of what eventually became the famous Natchez, Mississippi mansion called Montrose. He appears to be mentioned in the journal of Philip Buckner as arriving by flatboat in the Natchez District in April 1801: "A number of Boates arrived; Col. Baker among the number..." Kentuckians Buckner of Bracken County, and Baker of Mason County both sold slaves in Natchez in 1801, as did their fellow constitutional convention delegate John Adair. (Delegate Philemon Thomas had sold a man named David in Natchez in 1799.)

In autumn 1801 he was robbed of US$2,300 (equivalent to $44,505 in 2025) by highwaymen on the Natchez Trace, about 50 miles "above the Big Biopiere River." Samuel Mason was reportedly the culprit behind the holdup, and Baker was a "merchant living in central Kentucky. In his day he made a number of trips south, going down in flatboats and returning by way of the old Natchez Trace. Colonel Baker had the misfortune to come in contact with Mason at least once on land and once on water, and, as is later shown, played an important part in the activities that resulted in ending Mason's career. In the spring or summer of 1801, Colonel Baker took several flatboats filled with produce and horses to New Orleans. After disposing of his cargo, he set out on his return home, accompanied by four men, each of whom rode a horse. Besides the five riding horses there were five pack-mules in the cavalcade loaded down with provisions, and, among other things, the proceeds of the sales made in New Orleans. Colonel Baker and his men experienced no unusual trouble until they reached the ford across what was then called Twelve Mile Creek, but since known as Baker's Creek. The place is in Hinds County, Mississippi, about twenty miles west of Jackson." Mason was later captured and beheaded by another band of outlaws, who brought his head, preserved "in a ball of blue clay" to the territorial capital of Washington, Mississippi.

In 1805 he was appointed a Justice of Quorum for Wilkinson County, Mississippi Territory. A Kentucky boatman journaled in April 1806 that traveling downriver was slow going because the water levels were very low, noting, "A pretty cool night this morning we had a considerable shower off snow with a little rain My Brother Roy call'd on his way from Lexington to see me. We had our Boat full of company to dine with us. two Bakers two Dolemans Ledgerwood, Spilman, Ball, Irvin &c. We went this evening out to a ittle dance at E. Stiver's. I return'd home with Glacken. Winds very variable, lying clouds—hot." At the end of April 1806 he recorded, "We lash't with the Ledgerwoods Keel & Mr. Joshua Baker's flat Boat. We proceeded on at the rate of between 3 & 4 miles per hour. An Island just below the falls & 2 or 3 low rocky ones in it. This evening we divided into watches of 3 hands." By May they had made it to Illinois, and boatman John G. Stuart recorded, "Pass't the mouth of the Saline River about 10 this morning. The Banks covered with cane & Cotton Wood. Past some very picturesque rocks today & this evening past the Rock cave. Joshua Baker & self took our canoe and landed on it we thought it worth looking at. An Island just above it took the right hand shoot." A few days later they reached the confluence of the Ohio River and the Mississippi River and a barge going upstream brought news of what was to be known as the Sabine Expedition: "They informed us that there was a likelihood or a Spanish & Indian war. advised us to be on our guard. We landed near night about half a mile above the mouth of Ohio. Mr. Joshua Baker & Foulger took our canoe & cross't the Mississippi & bought some sugar & salt, the Mississippi very low. Flying clouds & light breeses, but very hot." John Baker, perhaps a relation, was described as "half drunk, his breeches absolutely torn off his ----, & his crew a set of a mean dirty looking fellows as ever I saw."

Baker was sent with approximately 25 men to reoccupy the federally abandoned Fort Adams in December 1806, with orders to intercept the Aaron Burr expedition. There is a letter in the Mississippi state archives dated January 21, 1807, reporting an account of his activities at the post to acting territorial governor Cowles Mead. In August 1807 Baker wrote a letter to Thomas Jefferson from the voting public of Wilkinson county about the Chesapeake incident. He served as the president of the legislative council of Mississippi Territory from 1806 to 1809. Territorial governor Robert Williams ordered Mississippi attorney general Seth Lewis to sue Baker for libel in 1807. In 1808, Baker and John Ellis, speaker of the territorial House of Representatives, signed off on a resolution requesting that their Congressional representative George Poindexter seek the impeachment of territorial judge Peter Bryan Bruin due to his alleged habitual drunkenness.

Joshua Baker appears on the 1810 U.S. census of residents of the Attapakas district, later St. Mary Parish, Louisiana. The Baker family was resident on a plantation there by 1812; they lived near Bayou Teche. Probate records show, "the will of Joshua Baker was signed in St. Mary Parish Feb. 15, 1812, and probated there April 29, 1812. In it he characterized himself as 'of the district of New Feliciana in that part of the Orleans Territory called West Florida.' The will is recorded in the West Feliciana Parish Clerk of Court's office, St. Francisville, La."

Baker represented Attakapas in the Louisiana House of Representatives in 1812.

Baker was an officer of the Louisiana militia during the War of 1812. He commanded a regiment at the Battle of New Orleans. He is possibly mentioned Andrew Jackson's description of the Battle of New Orleans as "Col° Baker of Allacassus [Attakapas?] who joined Genl Coffees Deth. [detachment?] with a few men push forward & take several prisoners—" There is a letter in the papers of Andrew Jackson from Baker, dated January 27, 1815, just days after the battle of January 8.

In 1813 Baker paid taxes on 32 enslaved people he owned near Bayou Teche.

Baker died at Nashville, Tennessee, of a sudden illness, reportedly influenza, at age 54.

== Descendants ==
Baker married Susan Lewis, who was a daughter of Rev. Isaac Lewis.

- In 1815 his daughter Evalina V. Baker married Alexander Porter. (She died in 1819 and is buried at Nashville City Cemetery.)
- His son Joshua Baker was a judge and military governor of Louisiana in 1868.
- His son Isaac Lewis Baker married Charlotte Lewis (a daughter of Nashville businessman William Terrell Lewis) and kept up a correspondence with Andrew Jackson. Isaac L. Baker served in the Louisiana state legislature.
- His daughter Mary Kenard Baker married planter John Ker.
- His daughter Susan Baker married planter Henry LeGrand Conner, son of Mississippi politician William Conner.
- His daughter Sarah Baker married Dr. James Metcalfe. It was through the Metcalfes, who also owned the York, Bourbon, and Deerfield estates, that Montrose descended. Metcalfe and brother-in-law Ker were business partners for a time in 1821. Metcalfe served in the Mississippi state legislature in the 1840s.

== Errata ==
Per a family history newsletter preserved by the Surry County, North Carolina historical society, "It might be well to note here, also, that Joshua Baker, second husband of Mary Callaway North Baker, has become confused with another contemporary Joshua Baker. This Joshua Baker died in the spring of 1816 in Gallatin Co., Ky. where his will is recorded, giving the names of his children and his step-son, John North. He is not the Col. Joshua Baker who married Susannah Lewis, and who was a member of the 1799 Second Constitutional Convention of Kentucky, in spite of the fact that a historical marker, erected near the home of Joshua and Mary Callaway North Baker, bears this information. Col. Joshua Baker also died in the spring of 1816 (April), but his children mostly moved to Mississippi. It has been said that Col. Joshua Baker is buried at the Hermitage in Nashville, Tenn."

== Sources ==
- n.a. (September 8, 2026). "Membership in the Louisiana House of Representatives, 1812 to 2028" (PDF). Baton Rouge: David R. Poynter Legislative Research Library, Louisiana House of Representatives.
