= Thomas A. Claiborne =

American physician (1770s–1818)

Thomas Augustine Claiborne (1770s–1818), sometimes Dr. Claiborne in correspondence, was an American physician and Tennessee state legislator. He was a member of the Claiborne family of Virginia and an associate of Andrew Jackson.

== Biography ==
Claiborne studied medicine at the University of Pennsylvania. For a time he worked as United States Navy surgeon. He was elected to the Tennessee House of Representatives from Davidson county in 1803. In January 1805 he was a signatory to a petition protesting the court-martial of Thomas Butler, probably produced at the behest of Andrew Jackson and sent to Thomas Jefferson's government, recorded in official state papers under the title "Disobedience of Orders Justified on the Grounds of Illegality."

Claiborne was secretary for the Treaty of the Chickasaw Nation signed near the Duck River, on July 23, 1805. In 1810, Claiborne sold an enslaved man named Pachile in Adams County, Mississippi Territory for $523 to Christopher Adams. In 1811, Claiborne served as "surgeon" on George Poindexter's side of the duel that killed Abijah Hunt in Mississippi.

Thomas A. Claiborne died in approximately 1818.

== Personal life ==
He and his brother William C. C. Claiborne married sisters who were daughters of land speculator William Terrell Lewis. Claiborne married Sarah Terrell Lewis in Davidson County, Tennessee on April 20, 1801. Sarah Lewis Claiborne died in Nashville in 1809.

Claiborne remarried Isabella Charlotte Hutchins Wooldridge, who was a widow of Edmond Wooldridge, and a sister of Mary Magdaline Hutchins, who was married to Claiborne's brother General Ferdinand Leigh Claiborne. The Hutchins sisters were daughters of early Mississippi settler Anthony Hutchins; another sister, Mary Hutchins, was married to Abner Green, and a brother, John Hutchins, was briefly married to Abner's sister Elizabeth Green. Edmund Wooldridge and F. L. Claiborne had been business partners who ran a store and owned land together in the Natchez District 1804–1805. Ed. Wooldridge died in 1807. Isabella Charlotte Hutchins Wooldridge Claiborne died June 12, 1816, in Natchez, at age 26, of a "long and hopeless disease of the breast".

"Children of Thos. A. Claiborne" were listed as residents of Adams County, Mississippi Territory in 1816. After Claiborne died, future U.S. President Andrew Jackson became guardian to his two sons, W. F. Claiborne and M. L. Claiborne.

- Micajah Greene Lewis Claiborne married Lavinia Cannon, a daughter of Newton Cannon. He was in the navy and the University of Michigan holds several letters describing his travels.
- Claiborne's daughter Mary Eliza Tennessee Claiborne married a Tennessee state legislator named Abram Poindexter Maury; Mary Eliza Claiborne Maury had nine children with her husband. Her brothers-in-law included John S. Reid and Carey A. Harris. One of their daughters married her first cousin, William S. Reid.

== Sources ==
- Hale, Nathaniel Claiborne (1948). Roots in Virginia; an account of Captain Thomas Hale, Virginia frontiersman, his descendants and related families. With genealogies and sketches of Hale, Saunders, Lucke, Claiborne, Lacy, Tobin and contributing ancestral lines. Philadelphia?: n.pub. LCCN 48004982. OCLC 608535745. OL 8012660W.
