= Early hotels of Nashville, Tennessee =

19th-century Cumberland River-area inns

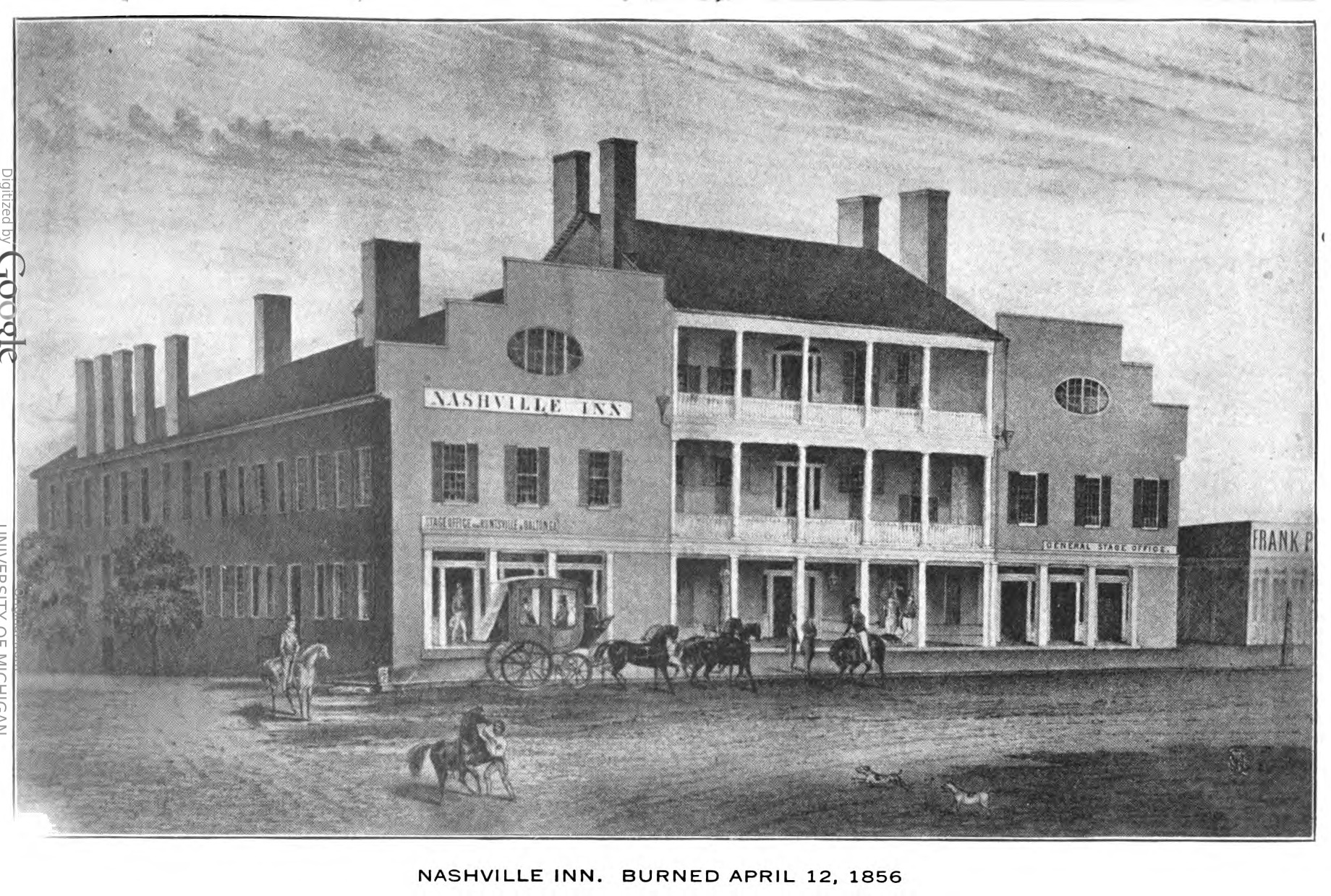
"Nashville Inn, burned April 12, 1856"

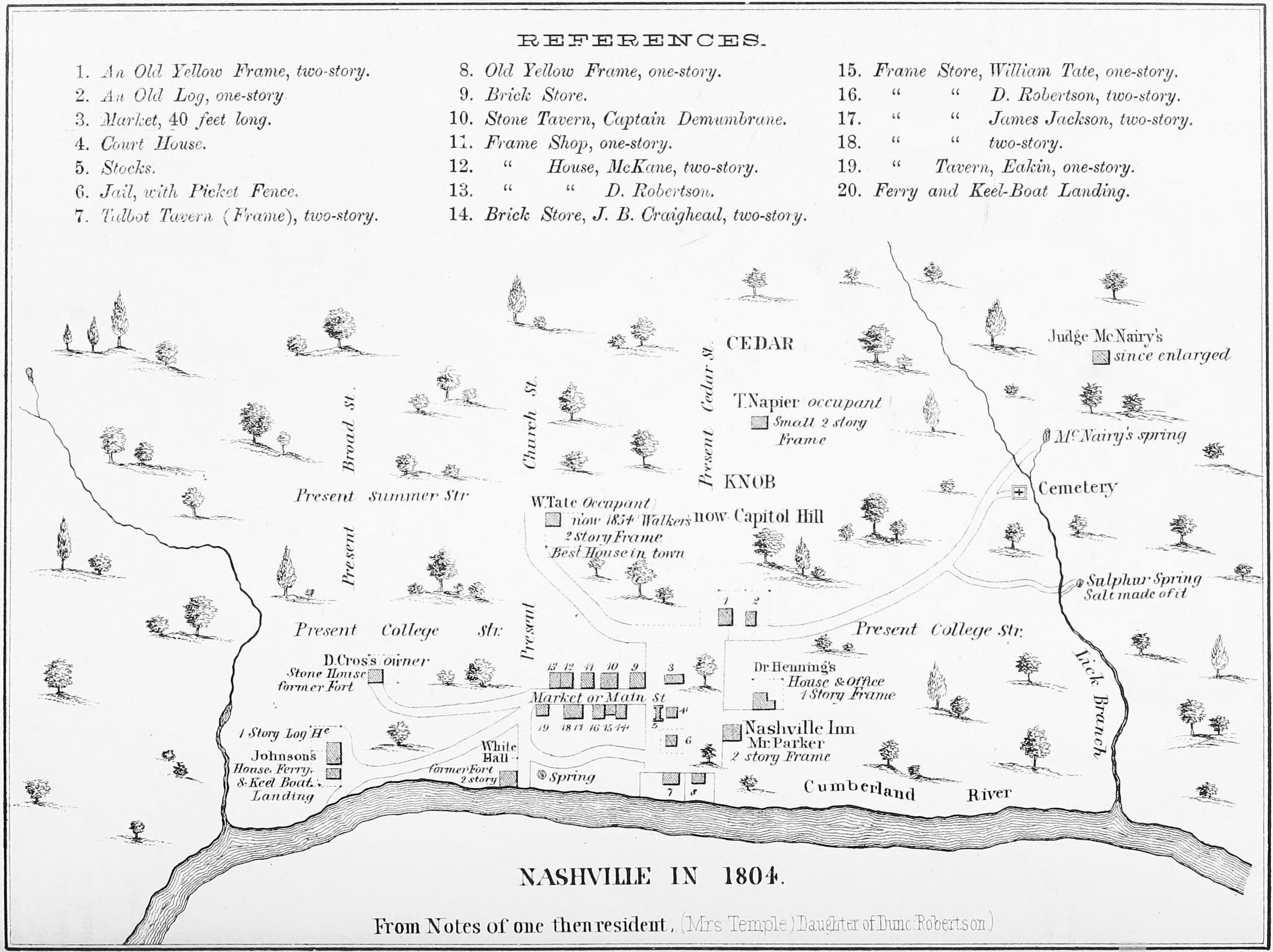
Nashville in 1804

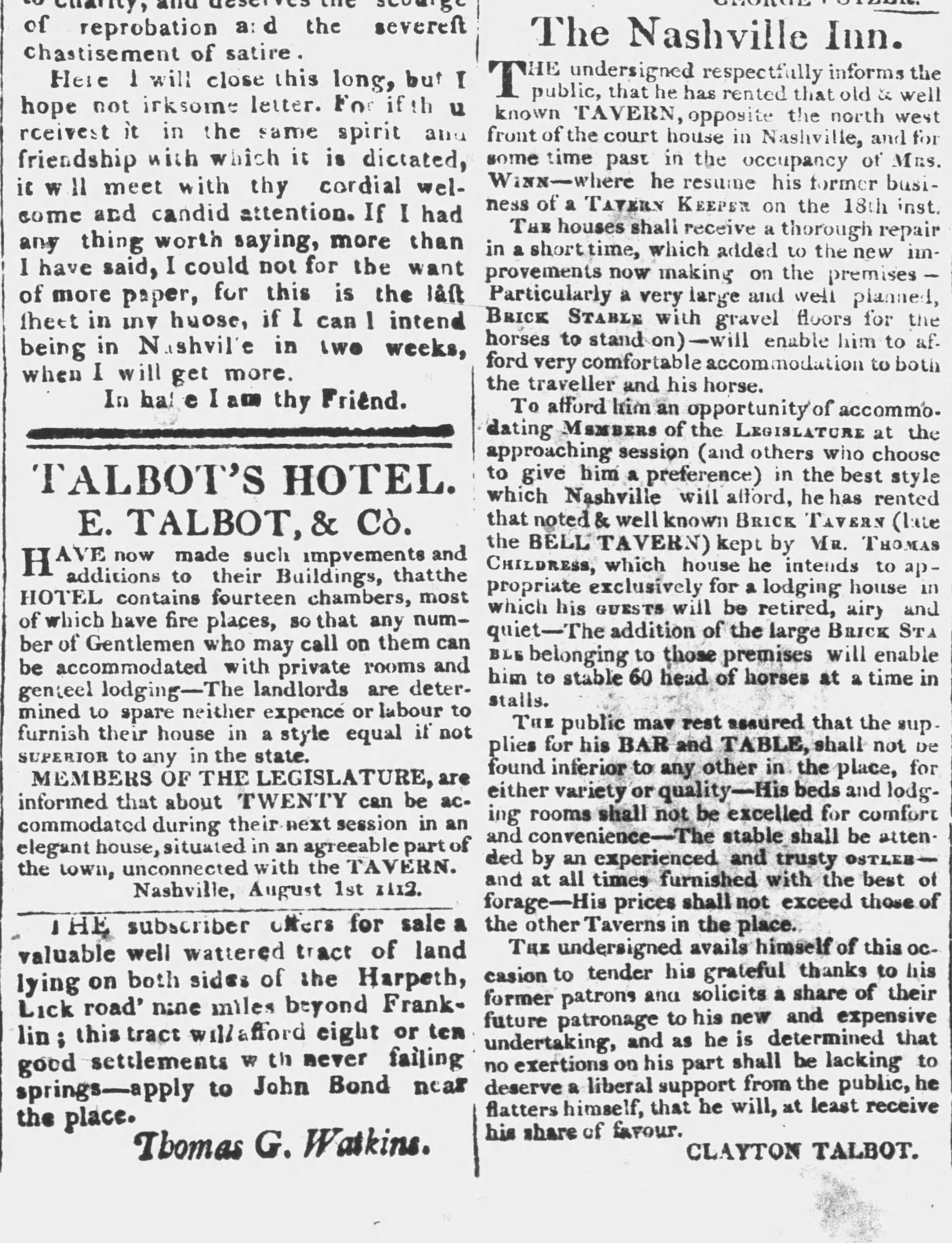
Advertising shows the preeminence of the Talbot name in early Nashville innkeeping (The Democratic Clarion and Tennessee Gazette, October 2, 1812)

In the late 18th and early 19th century, Nashville's location as the northern terminus of the Natchez Trace, an official United States post road, made it a busy stopover for travelers, and thus host to a cohort of historically significant taverns and hotels patronized by the likes of Andrew Jackson and Aaron Burr. Confusingly there were multiple tavern keepers named Talbot (Thomas Talbot, Clayton Talbot, Eli Talbot) operating in downtown Nashville, Tennessee, during the town's early history. As such, to resolve Talbot-based confusion, later historians often refer to the Nashville Inn (favored by Democrats) and City Hotel (favored by Whigs), even though those buildings, in the strictest sense, were built decades into the history of the city. The first tavern opened in the vicinity of Nashville is thought to have been King Boyd's Red Heifer distillery and tavern in the vicinity of French Lick. The taverns were popular in part because they did double duty as saloons: "The inhabitants of this town use a great quantity of spirituous liquors." The taverns also hosted traveling entertainers including tightrope walkers and traveling menageries of exotic birds and apes.

== Nashville Inn and antecedents ==
The so-called Nashville Inn was on the north side of the Square, originally "a large frame house owned by Maj. William T. Lewis, kept at one time as a tavern by Isham Parker also by Clayton Talbot, later became the Nashville Inn, 1825. It was a favorite place of Andrew Jackson and his friends." The Major Lewis Tavern was originally a private house built in 1797. Clayton Talbot took over and then it became known as Talbot's Tavern. This is the site of a dinner in honor of Aaron Burr held in October 1806, when many "appropriate toasts" were made in honor of the former vice president.

In 1825 it was called the Jackson Hotel, and then changed names to the Nashville Inn sometime between 1825 and 1832. As told in 1887, "Jackson's early and long-continued preference for Talbot's and its successors made this tavern a popular gathering place and later Democratic head-quarters. After his return from the battle of New Orleans,' says Col. A. W. Johnson, who was here at that period, 'Jackson frequently spent weeks at the Inn always surrounded by a coterie of his friends. It was nothing to see a crowd gather in the vacant lot and witness a cock fight, or even a set-to between some of the lookers-on.'" John Sevier died at the Nashville Inn. A dinner honoring the Marquis de Lafayette on his American tour in 1825 was held at the Nashville Inn. The Nashville Inn burned in 1856.

== City Hotel and antecedents ==
An abbreviated history of the court square tavern ultimately known to history as the City Hotel that was the site of the Jackson-Benton brawl of 1813 is that "In 1804 Thomas Talbot opened a new tavern on the east side of the square on town lot 171." This building, located on the northeast corner of the public square, persisted until 1826, when it was torn down and replaced with the City Hotel. The City Hotel was demolished in 1876 and replaced with the Ensley Block. As of 1967, "The present Talbot historical marker is placed too far south, across what was once Backus Alley, to mark the correct site." Notable guests of the City Hotel included Henry Clay, John J. Crittenden, John Bell, Sergeant Prentiss, and "doubtless" Millard Fillmore.

Early Nashville taverns
Founder	Start year	Most common name	Other names, proprietors	Party association
William Terrell Lewis	1797	Nashville Inn	Major Lewis Tavern, Isham Parker, Clayton Talbot, Talbot's Tavern, Jackson Hotel, Clayton Talbot's	Jacksonian Democrats
Thomas Talbot	1804	City Hotel	Talbot Hotel, Talbot's Hotel, Eli Talbot's	Anti-Jacksonians, Whigs, etc.

== Black Bob's Tavern ==
Black Bob's Tavern was in business around the turn of the 19th century, located on Market Street "below the alley" leading to College Street. Black Bob, legally Robert Renfro, was described as "a very prominent negro. He had a garden, and supplied a great many people with vegetables. His oldest daughter married Graham, a barber. She had a big wedding and invited all the prominent white people in town, and they all went. He was a very respectable, upright, humble negro. General Andrew Jackson attended the wedding, and Dr. McNairy danced the reel with the bride." Jackson was on the bench as a state judge for the criminal case of State v. Lavender in 1800, illustrative of the fact that "whites could be indicted for assaults upon blacks." The editors of The Legal Papers of Andrew Jackson surmise that Bob, the victim in State v. Lavender, was the tavern-keeping Black Bob.

== Bell Tavern ==
The Bell Tavern was "so called because a bell summoned the guests to their meals." It was located on the west side of the public square and "near the corner of College Street, was kept by Thomas Childress, E. Buford, and others." According to the memoirs of Jane Thomas, "At the time of 1804, where J. S. Reeves & Co.'s store now stands there stood a small one-story frame house used as a tavern and run by Thomas Childress, who married a Miss Curtis, and they had a beautiful daughter, Miss Paralee." This tavern was the site of a grand dinner hosted by Felix Grundy in 1814 to celebrate the successes of Nashvillians in the Creek War.

Thomas Childress also had an ordinary in Roane County, Tennessee in 1810. As described in a capsule biography written in 1869, Childress "removed from Nashville about 1819, to Florence, Alabama, where he died. From being one of the most wicked men, he became one of the most pious, and was a ruling Elder in the Presbyterian Church." Childress was later was an investor in a Pensacola, Florida land speculation that drew the attention of Congressional investigators.

== Winn's Tavern ==
Winn's Tavern is primarily known as the site of the attempted caning of Virginia lawyer Thomas Swann by Andrew Jackson. Jackson was reportedly almost knocked into the fireplace in the doing.

== William Roper's Tavern ==
According to the 1880 history of Davidson County, "On the east side of the square, a stone house where Berry & Demoville kept so many years was kept as a tavern by William Roper."

== Sources ==
- Kanon, Tom (2014). Tennesseans at War, 1812–1815: Andrew Jackson, the Creek War, and the Battle of New Orleans. Tuscaloosa: University of Alabama Press. ISBN 9780817318291. LCCN 2013049815. OCLC 900093586. Project MUSE book 30812.
- Thomas, Jane Henry (1897). Old Days in Nashville, Tennessee. Nashville, Tennessee: Publishing house Methodist Episcopal church, South, Barbee & Smith, agents. hdl:loc.gdc/scd0001.00146133502. LCCN 08018615. OCLC 4159540. OL 140000W.
