= Will Lewis (rugby union) =

Wales international rugby union player

- Full name: William Lewis
- Born: 14 March 1899 Morriston, Wales
- Died: 26 January 1927 (aged 27) Swansea, Wales
- University: Aberystwyth University College
- Occupation: School teacher

Rugby union career
- Position: Wing-forward
International career
| Years | Team | Apps | (Points) |
| 1925 | Wales | 1 | (0) |

William Lewis (14 March 1899 – 26 January 1927) was a Welsh international rugby union player.

A wing-forward, Lewis played his early rugby with hometown club Morriston and first trialled for Wales while at Aberystwyth University College. He later competed with Llanelly and Swansea. His only Wales cap came against France during the 1925 Five Nations and he was tasked with manning the French fly–half Yves du Manoir.

Lewis, a teacher by profession, was forced to retire from rugby for health reasons a season after having been capped for Wales. He died of an unspecified illness at his home in Swansea on 26 January 1927, at the age of 28.

== See also ==
- List of Wales national rugby union players
