= William Lewis (archdeacon) =

Irish Anglican cleric

William Lewis (1692-1767) was an 18th-century Anglican priest in Ireland.

Lewis was born in County Waterford and educated at Trinity College Dublin. Lewis was appointed prebendary of Cloyne Cathedral in 1729; vicar choral in 1730 and chancellor of Cloyne in 1742. Lewis was Archdeacon of Kilfenora from 1743 to 1767.
