= John S. Reid =

American military aide (1784–1816)

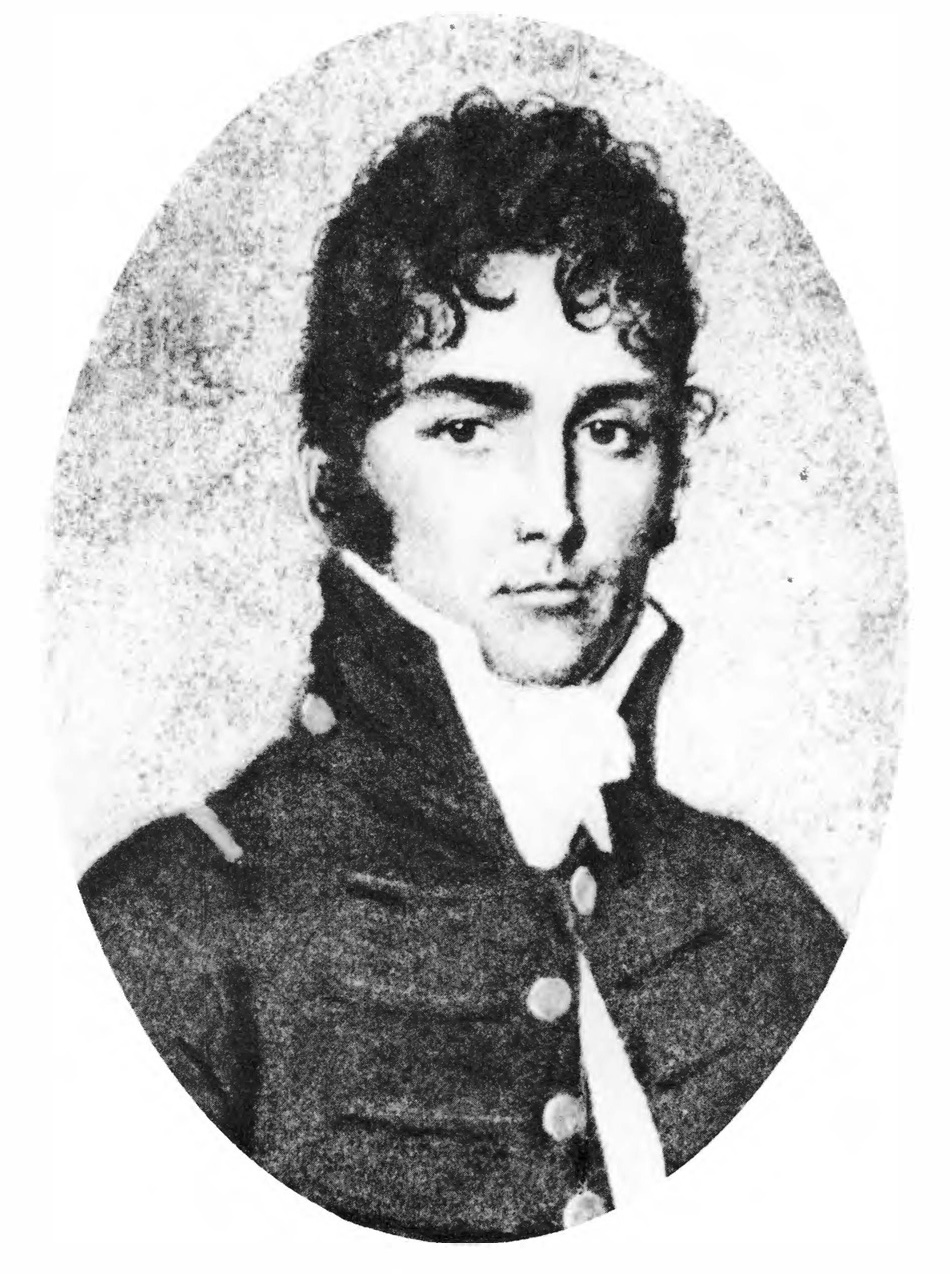
- Born: 1784; Virginia
- Died: January 18, 1816 (aged 31–32); Virginia

John S. Reid (1784–January 18, 1816) was an American lawyer and military aide-de-camp. He is best remembered today for his association with Andrew Jackson. Reid served as Jackson's primary amanuensis during the Creek War and War of 1812. Reid was commissioned a U.S. Army captain during the war and breveted major following the Battle of New Orleans; Jackson often referred to him as Maj. Reed in letters. Reid wrote the first four chapters of the first Jackson biography. Reid died suddenly and the book was completed for publication in 1817 by Jackson's eventual Secretary of War John Eaton.

== Early life and education ==
John S. Reid was the son of an American Revolutionary War officer named Nathan Reid, and he grew up in the Lynchburg, Virginia area. His education began at New-London Academy, and continued in Rockbridge Academy at Lexington before he began to read law with Christopher Clark in Bedford County. Reid moved to Rutherford County, Tennessee in 1807 and two years later established a practice in Williamson County." On September 6, 1809 in Williamson County, Tennessee, Reid married Elizabeth Branch Maury, the eldest daughter of Abram Maury. Reid's marriage fostered a friendship between his father-in-law and his patron. James Saunders wrote in his Alabama history published 1899, "All the Maurys were very much respected, but [Abram Maury] was the wealthiest and had the means to foster public enterprises and of dispensing wide hospitality. Major John Reid, who married his eldest daughter, had been a member of General Jackson's staff and his confidential secretary through all his campaigns. This brought about an intimacy between the General and Major Maury, which...had much to do with the fortunes of the Maury family. After the war with England closed I have often seen the General on his way to Major Maury's house with a small staff, all in neat undress uniform and with bear skin holsters."

== Creek War and War of 1812 ==
Reid's work for Jackson including serving as his aide-de-camp during the Creek War. He was appointed in 1813, "probably recommended" by Thomas Hart Benton, and "named second aide and secretary to the General. Reid showed unusual intellectual ability and became an immediate favorite." During much of the action of the war Jackson was disabled from having been shot by Jesse Benton during a Nashville bar fight in September 1813. Reid assisted with paperwork, include courts-martial cases, and other correspondence. He informed Chickasaw commissioner James Robertson in 1813 that "Leroy Pope, under a Cherokee title has gotten possession of a cave at the mouth of the Elk. When his permission was obtained from the Secretary at war, or upon what suggestion, I have not been able to learn; but I imagine it to be an old one, cloged with some conditions, which he obtained winter before last, through the interposition of Mr. Bibb from Kentucky. This had been presented to the commanding officer at Fort Hampton before, who then refused to let him have possession under it; but has since I presume thought proper to change his opinion." Jackson had his eye on Cherokee-titled land immediately south of Pope's on the Tennessee River, which he obtained and turned into his Melton's Bluff plantation and a paper town by decade's end. Meanwhile northern Alabama was being riven by the competing land-speculation syndicates of the Tennesseans and the Georgians (Pope was Georgia-aligned; Jackson, Tennessee); eventually they all decided to keep their enemies closer and jointly formed the Cypress Land Company.

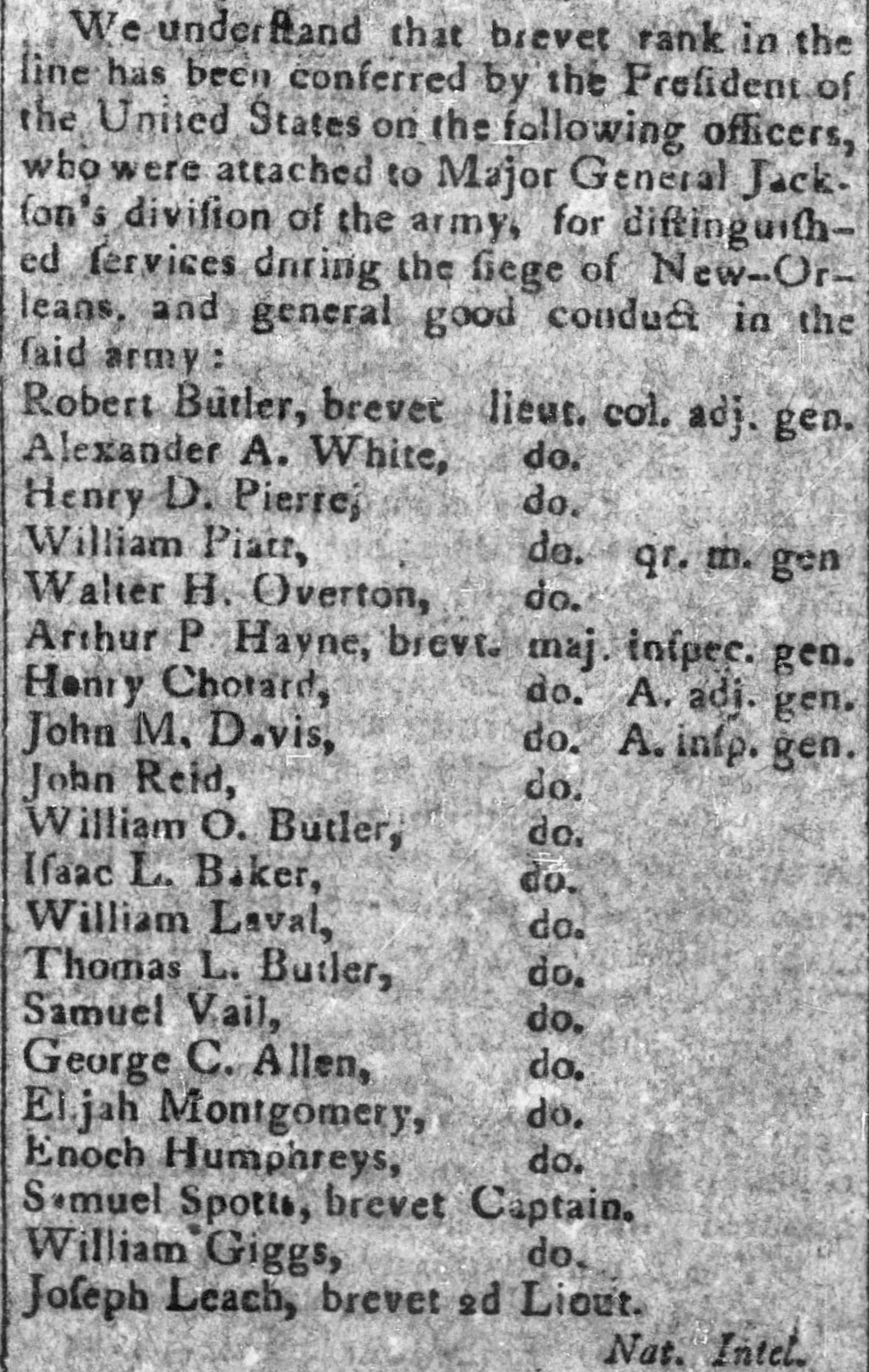
Reid was breveted major for his work as an assistant inspector general for Andrew Jackson at the battle of New Orleans; Samuel Clement wrote in 1827, "at New Orleans, the number of aides-de-camp which he had about him, I strongly suspect equated the number which Napoleon had, at the Battle of Austerlitz or any other of his great battles"

In July 1814 Reid was appointed a captain in the 44th U.S. Infantry. Andrew Jackson's after-action report to governor Willie Blount about the conduct of the Battle of Horseshoe Bend, which vanquished the Red Stick army, was written in John Reid's hand. Similarly, as retold by Jackson's most important 20th-century biographer, Robert Remini, "many of Jackson's official reports to the Secretary of War" about the Battle of New Orleans, were the work of "his military aide, Major John Reid." There is a fragmentary 45-page account handwritten by Jackson but "the account is not as full as one might wish; most details of the actual fighting on January 8 are missing," and "it ends abruptly with Jackson turning over the task of completing 'this memanda or journal' to Major Reid." Jackson became nationally famous as a result of that battle, and his supporters turned "Hero of New Orleans" into one of the greatest political brands in American history, but "curiously, the man most responsible for the victory—General Andrew Jackson of Tennessee—[was] singularly silent about it, at least as far as published accounts are concerned."

Similarly, Jackson's biography, writ large, is scant until he was 30 years old. In the words of one historian, "There is little that is actually known of his early life save the broad outline sketched by the General himself. Jackson was keenly interested in the presentation and interpretation of his political and military career and made an effort to furnish his biographers with the information he had, but his friends could get from him concerning his youth only brief stories and incidents. There is no connected narrative. For the most part he was content to refer would-be biographers to the work written by his friends, Major John Reid and Major John Henry Eaton, which was published in 1817. Writing to Edward Livingston in July 1815, Jackson said: 'I know of no pen that could do the subject more justice than yours. It is certainly the most unpleasant task for a man to be his own Biographer. I long since gave my friend Reed the narrative of my life as far as I could, he was to have furnished it to you long since. It will however be incorporated with the materials he is now collecting, and if he has not, when he furnishes you with the others, that will of course accompany them.'"

Reid wrote the first four chapters of The Life of Andrew Jackson before he died suddenly in January 1816. Eaton agreed to carry on the project, which was published in its first edition in 1817. Revisions were published in 1824 and 1828 to coincide with presidential campaigns. The book "justified the general's past conduct, established his virtuous character, and developed further the popular symbol of the general created at New Orleans."

== Death and legacy ==
Andrew Jackson "arrived at Lynchburg, Virginia, on December 31 [1815] and spent the following day visiting the family of his aide de-camp, John Reid, at Poplar Grove near New London in Campbell County. When Jackson left on January 2, Reid, his pregnant wife Elizabeth, and two children remained, intending to return to Tennessee in a few months." Reid was dead two weeks later, killed by a 20-hour bout with "typhoid pneumonia." His obituary testified that "his official communications from the head quarters of the army are public specimens of his style of writing, which was sprightly, strong, elegant, and perspicuous."

In 1830, Jackson wrote United States Military Academy superintendent Sylvanus Thayer asking him to look out for Reid's son, cadet William Steptoe Reid. For a time, W. S. Reid was West Point roommates with Edgar Allan Poe (room 28, South barracks) but both young men departed the school in due course. William Steptoe Reid married his first cousin, Sarah Claiborne Maury, daughter of Abram P. Maury and Mary Elizabeth Terrell Claiborne.

== See also ==
- Carey A. Harris, brother-in-law

== Sources ==
- n.a. (July 1900). "Correspondence of Gen. James Robertson". The American Historical Magazine. 5 (3): 252–286. ISSN 2333-8970. JSTOR 45283960.
- Clement, Samuel (1827). Truth is no slander: therefore read; enquire; reflect. Natchez, Mississippi: Printed at the Ariel Office. McMurtrie MS Imprints No. 219, Shoemaker 28519 – via Mississippi Department of Archives and History.
- Davis, Louise (1999). "Abram Maury, The Founder of Franklin" (PDF). Williamson County Historical Journal. 30. Originally published in The Nashville Tennessean Magazine, October 3, 1948: 44–47. LCCN 86642787. OCLC 14186085.
- Kanon, Thomas (Spring 1999). ""A Slow, Laborious Slaughter": The Battle of Horseshoe Bend". Tennessee Historical Quarterly. 58 (1): 2–15. ISSN 0040-3261. JSTOR 42627446.
- Kegley, Tracy M. (March 1948). "James White Stephenson: Teacher of Andrew Jackson". Tennessee Historical Quarterly. 7 (1): 38–51. ISSN 0040-3261. JSTOR 42620965.
- Remini, Robert V. (Spring 1967). "Andrew Jackson's Account of the Battle of New Orleans". Tennessee Historical Quarterly. 26 (1): 23–42. ISSN 0040-3261. JSTOR 42622915.
- ——— (1977). Andrew Jackson and the Course of American Empire, 1767–1821. New York: Harper & Row. ISBN 978-0-8018-5912-0. LCCN 77003766. OCLC 1145801830.
- Rice, Cpt. Mark (n.d.). "Defending the ramparts: the United States Military Academy's struggle for survival in the age of Jackson". USMA Library. Tactical Officer Education Program. West Point, New York: United States Military Academy.
- Saunders, James Edmonds; Stubbs, Elizabeth Saunders Blair (1899). Early Settlers of Alabama. New Orleans: L. Graham & Son. LCCN rc01002465. OCLC 2660177.
- Various; Jackson, Andrew (1980). Smith, Sam B.; Owsley, Harriet Chappell; Moser, Harold D. (eds.). The Papers of Andrew Jackson, Volume I, 1770–1803. Knoxville: University of Tennessee Press. doi:10.7290/utp7943. ISBN 978-0-8704-9219-8. LCCN 79015078. OCLC 5029597.
- ———; ——— (1984). Moser, Harold D.; MacPherson, Sharon (eds.). The Papers of Andrew Jackson, Volume II, 1804–1813. University of Tennessee Press. doi:10.7290/utp3038. ISBN 978-0-8704-9441-3.
- ———; ——— (1991). Moser, Harold D.; Hoth, David R.; MacPherson, Sharon; Reinbold, John H. (eds.). The Papers of Andrew Jackson, Volume III, 1814–1815. University of Tennessee Press. doi:10.7290/utp9085. ISBN 978-0-87049-650-9.
- ———; ——— (1994). Moser, Harold D.; Hoth, David R.; Hoemann, George H. (eds.). The Papers of Andrew Jackson, Volume IV, 1816–1820. University of Tennessee Press. doi:10.7290/utp8684. ISBN 978-0-8704-9219-8.
- Warshauer, Matthew (Spring–Summer 1998). "Andrew Jackson as a 'Military Chieftain' in the 1824 and 1828 Presidential Elections: The Ramifications of Martial Law on American Republicanism". Tennessee Historical Quarterly. 57 (1): 4–23. ISSN 0040-3261. JSTOR 42627394.
