= Ronald N. Satz =

Ronald N. Satz (died March 7, 2006) was an academic administrator and historian who wrote about the history of Native Americans and the United States. He was known for writing American Indian Policy in the Jacksonian Era.

== Writings ==
- Federal Indian Policy in the Jacksonian Era
- Chippewa Treaty Rights: The Reserved Rights of Wisconsin's Chippewa Indians in Historical Perspective (1994)
- Tennessee's Indian Peoples: From White Contact To Removal, 1540-1840
