= Bill Lewis (footballer, born 1921) =

English footballer

William Albert Lewis (23 November 1921 – 27 August 1998) was a professional footballer for Blackpool and, notably, Norwich City F.C.

For Norwich, Lewis played from 1949 to 1954, making 256 appearances and scoring one goal.

After he retired from playing, he became a coach and reserve team trainer for Norwich.

He was elected to the Norwich City F.C. Hall of Fame in 2003.
