= William Lewis (cricketer) =

English cricketer

William Henry Lewis (3 December 1807 – 10 October 1889) was a Welsh cricketer with amateur status. He was educated at Harrow, where he played for the school in 1825 and 1826. He then went up to Trinity College, Oxford, and played for Oxford University in 1827.

After Oxford, Lewis studied law at the Middle Temple. Later he lived in a house called Clynfiew (Clynfyw) in Abercych, near the tripoint of Pembrokeshire, Carmarthenshire and Cardiganshire. He was a magistrate and Deputy Lieutenant for Pembrokeshire, and High Sheriff of Pembrokeshire in 1847.

== Bibliography ==
- Haygarth, Arthur (1996) [1862]. Scores & Biographies, Volume 1 (1744–1826). Kennington: Frederick Lillywhite. ISBN 978-19-00592-23-9.
- Haygarth, Arthur (1997) [1862]. Scores & Biographies, Volume 2 (1827–1840). Kennington: Frederick Lillywhite. ISBN 978-19-00592-23-9.
