= Billy Lewis (Scottish footballer) =

Scottish footballer

Personal information
- Full name: William Lindsay Lewis
- Date of birth: 29 March 1931
- Place of birth: Kilwinning, Scotland
- Date of death: 12 November 2015 (aged 84)
- Place of death: Irvine, Scotland
- Height: 5 ft 9 in (1.75 m)
- Position: Centre half

Senior career*
Years	Team	Apps	(Gls)
1951–1953	Irvine Meadow		
1953–1956	Morton		
1956–1964	Third Lanark	181	(6)
- * Club domestic league appearances and goals

William Lindsay Lewis (29 March 1931 – 12 November 2015) was a Scottish footballer who played mainly as a centre half for Morton (making over 100 appearances in all competitions) and Third Lanark (achieving a promotion to the top tier in 1956–57, playing on the losing side in the 1959 Scottish League Cup Final, helping the club to a third-place finish in the 1960–61 Scottish Division One campaign, and winning the Glasgow Cup in the 1962–63 season).

He began his career – playing in a more attacking position – in junior football with Irvine Meadow, a club his son Rab also played for in the 1970s with some success.
