= Willie Lewis (rockabilly musician) =

American musician (1946–2014)

Willie Lewis (1946 – October 17, 2014) was an American rockabilly musician and founder of The Rock-A-Billy Record Company, a record label based in Denver, Colorado.

Lewis started the label in order to release rare and authentic rockabilly recordings, most of which were pressed on colored vinyl between 1982 and 1998. He released music from artists such as Go Cat Go, Ronnie Dawson, Don Rader, Marti Brom, High Noon, Jonny Barber & The Rhythm Razors, Little Roy Williamson & the Denver Ramblers, Kidd Pharaoh, and the Redline Rockets.

He recorded his own music under a variety of names, including Willy & the String Poppers, Billy & the Bop Cats, King Cat & the Pharaohs, the Bop-a-Whiles, and most recently Willie & The Rhythm Razors. The Rock-A-Billy Record Company celebrated its 25th anniversary in 2007, and in honor of its birthday Lewis released new Silver Anniversary records on colored vinyl once again.

Lewis died on October 17, 2014, at the age of 68.

== Partial discography ==
- Willie Lewis & Others - "24 Rockin' Tracks From Denver Colorado" (Compact disc, Goofin' Records, 1993)
- Delmer Spudd & The Spuddnicks - "It's Saturday Night" (10-inch LP, Bop-Land Records, 1996)
- Willie Lewis - "The Complete Rock-A-Billy Sessions" (Compact disc, Goofin' Records, 1997)
- Willie Lewis - "The Early, Rare & Wild Side" (12-inch LP, Bop-Land Records, 1997)
- Willie Lewis & The Stablemen - "Colored Records" (Compact disc, Rock-A-Billy Records, 1999)
- Willie Lewis - "A Legend of His Time" (Compact disc, Rhythm Bomb Records, 2003)
- Willie & the Bop-A-Whiles "Don't Shoot Me Baby" (12-inch LP, Hog Maw Records, 2008)

== Sources ==
- Bergmann, Sven (2003) The Story of a Hep-Cat, Life and Music of Willie Lewis and His Rock-A-Billy Record Co. Verlag-Bergmann Music, Germany
