= Bill Lewis (footballer, born 1874) =

Australian rules footballer

Personal information
- Full name: William Lachlan Mark Lewis
- Born: 15 September 1874; Hamilton, Victoria
- Died: 10 May 1940 (aged 65); Kalgoorlie, Western Australia
- Original team: Richmond City

Playing career^{1}
Years	Club	Games (Goals)
1900	Carlton	15 (9)
- ^{1} Playing statistics correct to the end of 1900.

William Lachlan Mark Lewis (15 September 1874 - 10 May 1940) was an Australian rules footballer who played with Carlton in the Victorian Football League (VFL).
