= William Terrell Lewis =

American tavern keeper (1757–1838)

Maj. William Terrell Lewis, Jr. (1757–1808) & Mrs. William Terrell Lewis, Jr. (Tennessee Portraits Project 29724)

William Terrell Lewis (1757 – February 4, 1813) was an American Revolutionary War veteran, land surveyor, land speculator, tavern keeper, and North Carolina state legislator.

== Biography ==
Lewis was one of 11 children of William Terrell Lewis Sr. and his wife Sallie Martin of Virginia; Lewis Sr. "kept a tavern on the Staunton Road, about three miles west of Charlottesville, called at first Terrell's and subsequently Lewis's Ordinary." The family moved to North Carolina and he and his brothers, Micajah Lewis, Col. Joel Lewis, and James M. Lewis, all fought with the Continental Army at the Battle of King's Mountain in 1780. His brother Micajah Lewis was killed at the Battle of Guilford Court House in 1781. He was sometimes referred to as Maj. Wm. T. Lewis from his army rank. Joel Lewis moved to Nashville as well, and one of his daughters, Sarah Martin Lewis, married first James King of Saltville, Virginia, and second Thomas B. Claiborne.

In 1784 he was named as surveyor for the western district of North Carolina land office, in what would shortly become Tennessee. He was appointed at the same time as William Polk and Stockley Donelson, brother of the future Rachel Donelson Robards Jackson. In 1785 he represented Wilkes County in the North Carolina House of Commons.

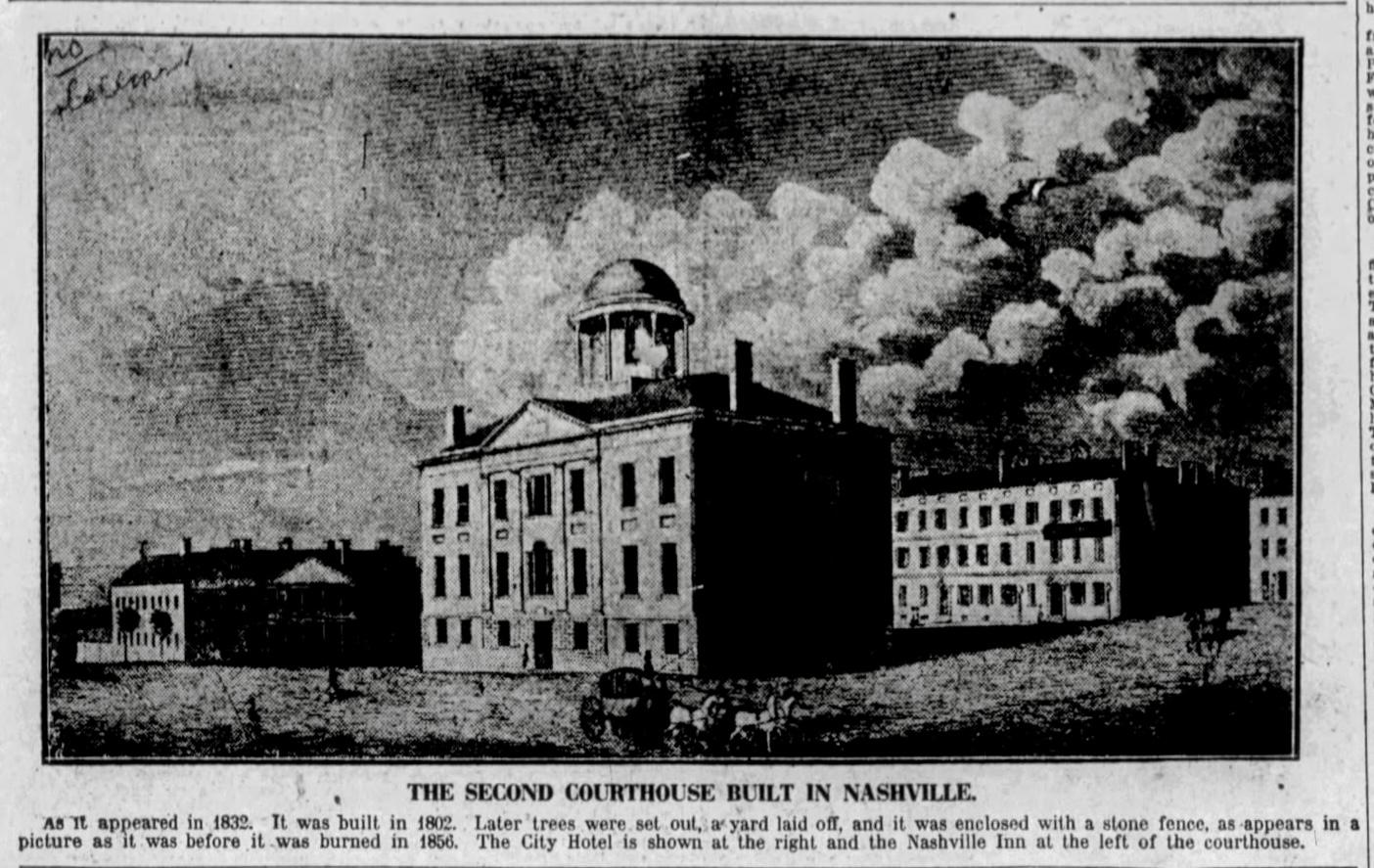
Central Nashville in 1832, the building on the left is the Nashville Inn, in the center is the Davidson County Courthouse built 1802, on right the City Hotel

Sometimes spelled William Terrill Lewis or recorded as Wm. Terry Lewis, he moved to the settlement of Nashville, Tennessee with his father and brothers around 1793. He built one of the first two brick homes in Davidson County, Tennessee. He was known as land speculator and "kept a hotel for many years. He was very kind and hospitable to strangers, and his house was the stopping-place for all distinguished lawyers and dignitaries on visiting Nashville." This was the preferred tavern of Andrew Jackson and thus local Democrats; the Whigs patronized the City Hotel across the courtyard square. Lewis was a land speculator during this era, along with John Armstrong, his brother Martin Armstrong, North Carolina Secretary of State James Glasgow, Stockley Donelson, William Blount, and William Terrell. Donelson and Lewis were both charged with fraud or dishonesty at one time or another over the course of their careers in speculation.

On March 11, 1797, Lewis (unclear if Senior or Junior) sold Andrew Jackson 1,000 acres of land in Madison County, Tennessee for $250. In the year 1800, Lewis, Judge McNairy, and Dr. Henning founded the Federalist Academy school, which unified with the Davidson Academy in short order.

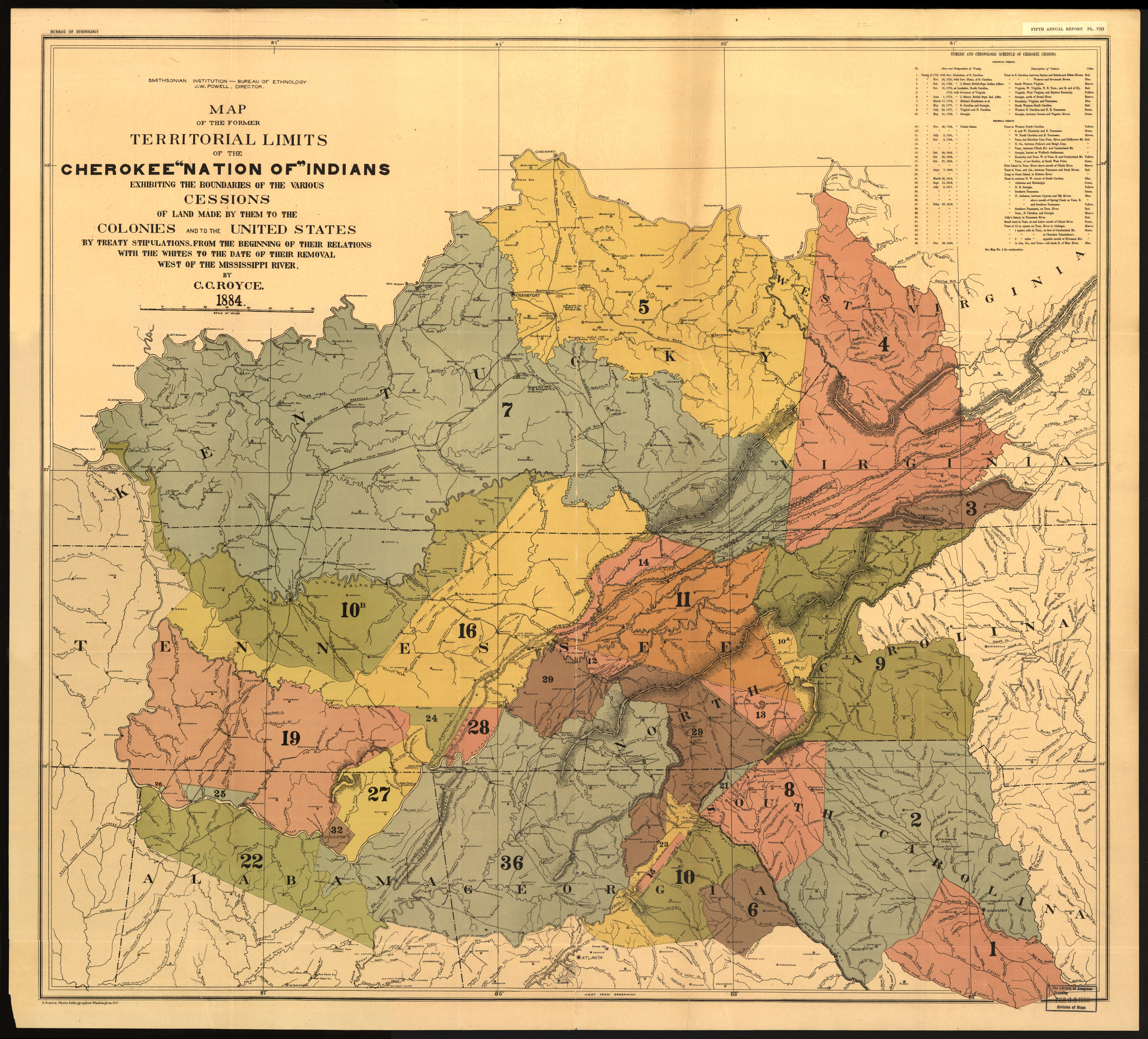
1884 map of Cherokee land cessions showing Colbert's Ferry

On February 14, 1804, Lewis, Andrew Jackson, John McNairy, and James Robertson were "subscribers" to a contract between John Gordon and William Colbert (brother of Levi Colbert and George Colbert) to establish a trading standing and ferry at what came to be known as Colbert's Ferry across the Duck River on the 1801 line of treaty with the Chickasaws regarding the Natchez Trace between Nashville and Natchez District. (Gordon would later be Jackson's personal spymaster throughout the Creek War and during two separate pushes into Spanish-controlled Pensacola, Gordon apparently playing important roles as envoy or scout or advance man in both 1814 and 1819.) According to the memoir of Jane Thomas, when she arrived in Nashville with her family in 1804, "William Terrill [sic] Lewis was one of the wealthiest men in Nashville...He lived in the house in South Nashville which is now used [as of 1897] as a Catholic hospital. It is called Fairfield."

In June 1809, Thomas Claiborne, Wm. P. Anderson, John Gray Blount, Samuel Hogg and Lewis agreed to host a "cocking ring" (cockfighting tournament) in Nashville on Fourth of July weekend. This event was apparently heavily patronized and during which "large sums of money and several horses were exchanged."

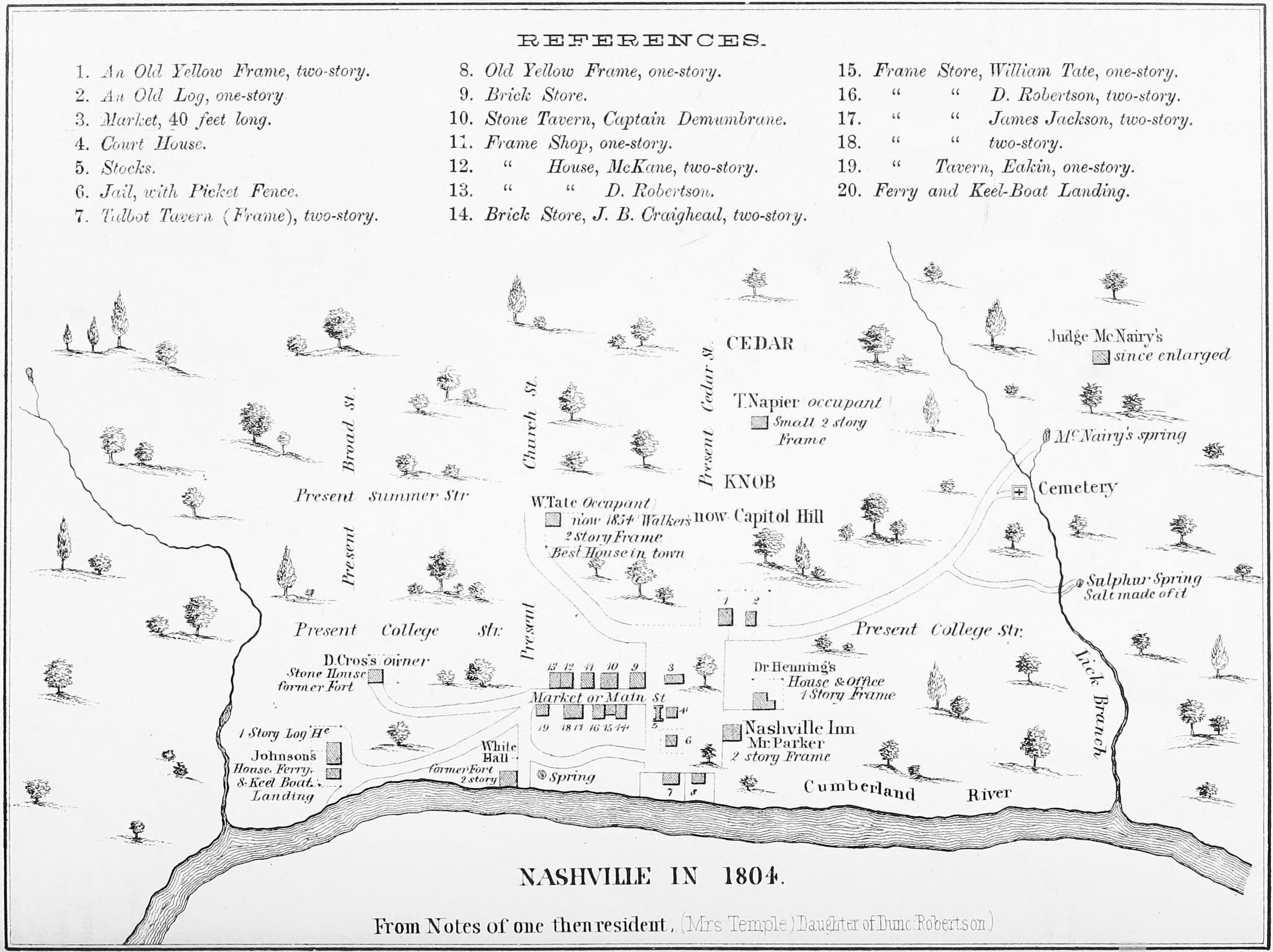
Map of Nashville in 1804 showing Judge McNairy's house and McNairy's Spring

During the 1828 presidential election, Andrew Jackson's political opponents suggested that he may have engaged in treasonous sedition during the Burr conspiracy. One of Jackson's defenses was an index of men who he said had volunteered to join him putting down any insurrection against the federal government. The list of notable militia volunteers furnished by Jackson's campaign committee included Major William T. Lewis and his brother Joel Lewis, as well General James Robertson, Capt. James Hennen (surgeon), General Thomas Overton, Major Howell Tatum, Major Clem. Hall, Captain James Tatum, Colonel Robert Hays, Captain William Richard, Captain Stephen Cantrell, Captain Norbert Edmondson, Major William Walton, Captain William Lytle, Captain Joshua Hadley, Captain John Beck, Captain John Park, Capt. Joseph Coleman, William Tait, Thomas Talbot, George Poyzer, Thomas Dillon, William Whorton, and George Whorton.

Lewis' plantation in Davidson County, Tennessee was called Fairfield. According to an old settler, "The most important road leading to and from Nashville at that time, and up to the building of the turnpike road, was the Murfreesboro dirt road, which led from the public square on Market street, out by the old Cumberland College to where Mr. John Trimble now resides, then on, crossing Mill creek at R. C. Poster's mill. The first prominent citizen on this road was Col. Joel Lewis, who had a brother living at Fairfield, William Terrel Lewis...There was no road leading by William B. Lewis' house; a lane, however, extended to the Murfreesboro road, and this was the road to Fairfield."

Three of his daughters married men who became some of Andrew Jackson's closest advisors: John Eaton, William Berkeley Lewis, and Alfred Balch. According to Mrs. M. S. Asher of Atlanta, interviewed in 1905, William Berkeley Lewis, no close relation, came to Nashville and married Lewis' youngest daughter, Margaret Lewis. The father objected to the marriage—his daughter was too young—but "objections on account of her youth were overruled by an elopement, the marriage taking place at the home of Col. James Jackson, the couple later going to the Hermitage till invited home." Another set of daughters married brothers, Dr. Thomas A. Claiborne and William C. C. Claiborne, governor of Mississippi Territory and later Louisiana. Lewis' only son, Micajah Green Lewis, moved to New Orleans and became an aide to his brother-in-law Governor Clairborne. Lewis was killed in a duel in New Orleans in 1805.

Lewis' son-in-law William B. Lewis wrote Andrew Jackson on February 8, 1813, that "Maj. William T Lewis died on thursday morning last about 4 O'clock." Jackson replied from his Natchez expedition, "I regret the death of Major Lewis—I fear his business is verry much unsettled—and that his family may be injured thereby—I shall be happy to hear from you often." The executors of Lewis' estate were Andrew Jackson, Thomas Crutcher, and Alfred Balch. His widow Mary Hipkins Lewis survived until 1824. The Fairfield plantation eventually came into the possession of his Maj. W. B. Lewis.

== Descendants ==
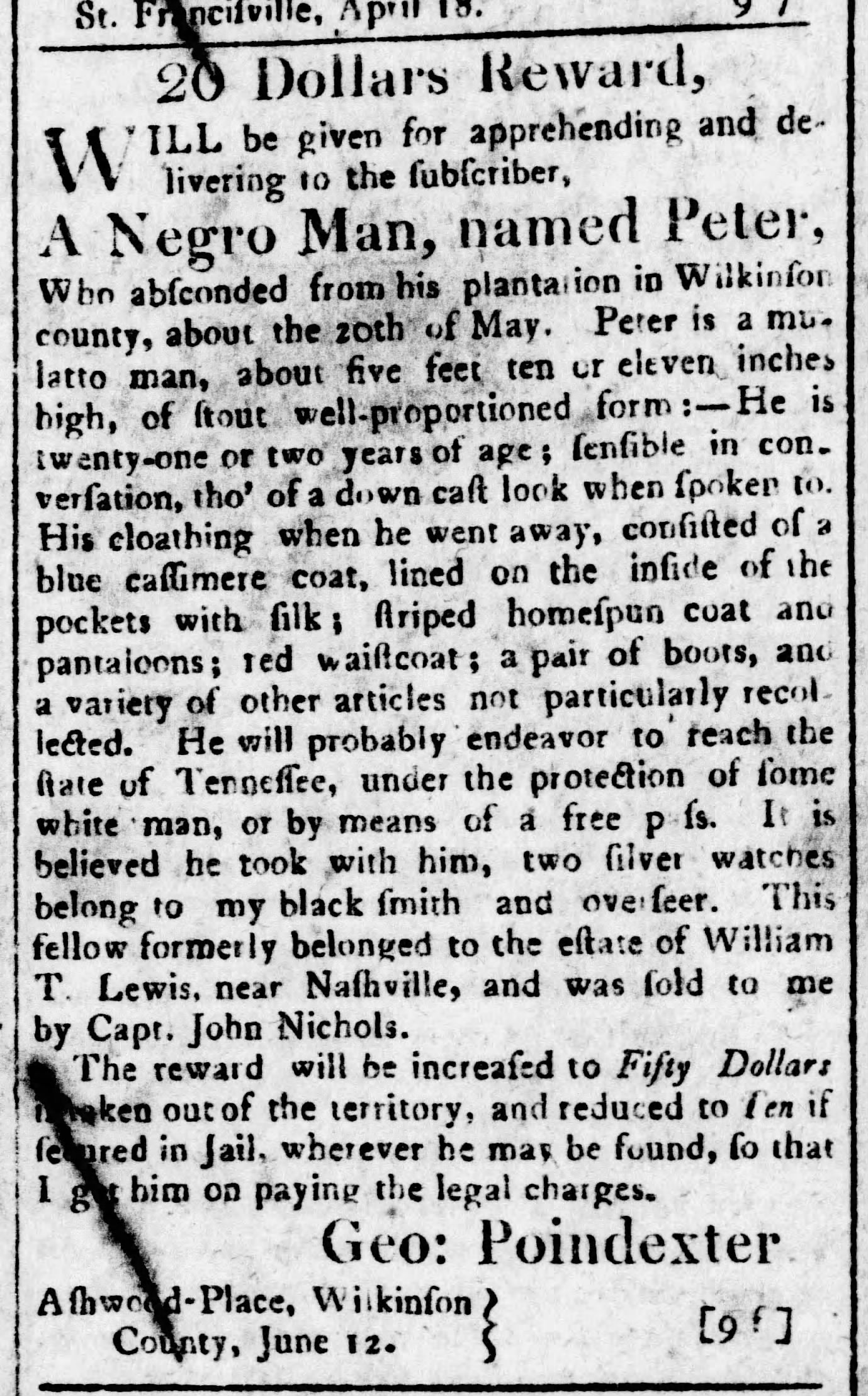
"20 Dollars" Reward for the recapture of Peter, formerly enslaved by William T. Lewis of Nashville, offered by George Poindexter of Ashwood Place in Wilkinson County, Mississippi Territory; Peter had been trafficked from Tennessee by John Nichols (Natchez Gazette, July 17, 1816)

Lewis was married to "Mary Hipkins, who was said to be a dowerless beauty and half-sister to Miriam Eastham, the wife of Colonel Joel Lewis. These two sisters were said to be related to Lord Fairfax, of Virginia."

- Sarah T. Lewis, born 1780; married Dr. Thos. A. Claiborne; Andrew Jackson became guardian to their children after they both died
- Eliza Lewis, born 1782; married Governor Wm. C. C. Claiborne; she and her baby died of yellow fever in New Orleans
- Micajah Green Lewis, killed in a duel in Louisiana in 1805
- Mary Lewis, born 1786; married Alfred Balch, died shortly thereafter
- Myra Lewis, born 1788; married Major John H. Eaton, died shortly thereafter; Eaton's second wife was Margaret "Peggy" O'Neill Timberlake, of Petticoat Affair notoriety
- Charlotte Lewis, born 1792; married Major Isaac L. Baker "of New Orleans, and died soon afterwards"; Baker was a son of Joshua Baker
- Margaret, born 1793; married Major Wm. B. Lewis; they had one daughter before Margaret died in 1815. According to J. Thomas, "William B. Lewis's daughter married George Washington. She died, and he

married Miss Jane Smith." Lewis' second wife was Adelaide Stokes Chambers, a daughter of Montfort Stokes of North Carolina.

== See also ==
- Wards of Andrew Jackson
- Andrew Jackson and cockfighting
- Early hotels of Nashville, Tennessee
- Abram Maury Jr.

== Sources ==
- Harlan, Louis R. (March 1948). "Public Career of William Berkeley Lewis". Tennessee Historical Quarterly. 7 (1): 3–37. ISSN 0040-3261. JSTOR 42620964.
- Remini, Robert V. (1977). Andrew Jackson and the Course of American Empire, 1767–1821. New York: Harper & Row. ISBN 978-0-8018-5912-0. LCCN 77003766. OCLC 1145801830.
- Thomas, Jane Henry (1897). Old Days in Nashville, Tennessee. Nashville, Tennessee: Publishing house Methodist Episcopal church, South, Barbee & Smith, agents. hdl:loc.gdc/scd0001.00146133502. LCCN 08018615. OCLC 4159540. OL 140000W.
