= Billy Lewis (footballer, born 1923) =

Welsh footballer

Personal information
- Full name: William Lewis
- Date of birth: 4 July 1923
- Place of birth: Cardiff, Wales
- Date of death: 27 July 2013 (aged 90)
- Position: Outside forward

Senior career*
Years	Team	Apps	(Gls)
1941–1947	Cardiff City	10	(0)
1947–1950	Newport County	49	(11)
- * Club domestic league appearances and goals

William Lewis (4 July 1923 — 27 July 2013) was a Welsh professional footballer who played as an outside forward. He made 59 appearances in the Football League during spells with Cardiff City and Newport County.

== Career ==
Born in Cardiff, Lewis began his career with his hometown club Cardiff City. He joined the club during wartime in 1941, resulting in his professional debut coming six years later in a 6–2 victory over Northampton Town in January 1947. However, he struggled to establish himself in the first team and, after making ten league appearances, he was allowed to join Newport County soon after. He scored 11 goals in 49 league appearances for Newport before dropping out of professional football.
