= William Berkeley Lewis =

Kitchen Cabinet (1784–1866)

William Berkeley Lewis (1784 – November 12, 1866) was an influential friend and advisor to Andrew Jackson. He was born in Loudoun County, Virginia, and later moved near Nashville, Tennessee, in 1809. Major Lewis served as quartermaster under General Jackson. Later, in politics, he was a manager of Jackson and retained considerable influence until Jackson's second term as President of the United States. Jackson appointed Lewis as second auditor of the Treasury, a position he was able to retain until the Polk administration.

== Early life ==
In 1812 Lewis was listed as assistant deputy quartermaster for Andrew Jackson's Tennessee volunteers. Thomas Hart Benton, latterly a United States Senator from Missouri, published "Journal of a voyage from Nashville to Orleans, by the Tennessee Volunteers," in the Clarion and Tennessee Gazette newspaper (in three parts: February 9, February 16, March 9), and "alleged that Lewis was an incompetent quartermaster, having failed to have on hand the necessary supplies and boats for the Natchez expedition." Lewis was a witness to the signing of the Treaty of Tuscaloosa with the Chickasaw.

== Political advisor ==
In 1822, Lewis and John Eaton attempted to nominate a candidate before the Tennessee legislature to oppose John Williams, who was openly against Jackson's candidacy for president in 1824. After being unable to find a viable candidate, they nominated Jackson himself. The strategy was successful, and Jackson won. The results took him by surprise, and although he did not wish to serve, he accepted the results of the election.

Lewis played a crucial role in electioneering for Jackson during his campaigns for the presidency in 1824 and 1828. Jackson lost in 1824 but won in 1828. Afterwards, his first inaugural address was composed at Lewis's home in Nashville, Tennessee by Jackson, Lewis, and Henry Lee IV. During Jackson's presidency, Lewis resided with him in the White House and served as his advisor. According to Jackson biographer James Parton, "He almost alone retained to the last the friendship of General Jackson, without agreeing with him in opinion upon subjects of controversy." Lewis was seen as part of a group of unofficial advisors known as the "Kitchen Cabinet" who helped Jackson formulate policy. Lewis was more a personal confederate of Jackson than a stakeholder in U.S. national politics as a whole.

During the Bank War, Lewis, in contrast to Jackson, took a position moderately in favor of the Second Bank of the United States. Even so, in the fall of 1831, he warned its president, Nicholas Biddle, not to apply for recharter. He correctly predicted that Jackson would see the bill as a challenge to his leadership and veto it. At the 1830 Jefferson Day Dinner at Jefferson Brown's Indian Queen Hotel, Jackson was to give a toast. This took place in the midst of the Nullification Crisis, and John C. Calhoun, Jackson's estranged vice president who supported nullification, would be in attendance. Jackson concluded, according to Lewis, "that the celebration was to be a nullification affair altogether." The following day, Jackson presented three possible toasts to Lewis. "I ran my eye over them and then handed him the one I liked best...He said he preferred that one himself for the reason that it was shorter and more expressive. He then put it into his pocket and threw the others into the fire." Jackson attended the dinner, and to the horror of many in attendance read out the toast: "Our Federal Union. It must be preserved." Calhoun then responded, in part, "The Union, next to our Liberty the dearest."

== Other activities ==
In 1818 Lewis was involved a Chickasaw treaty side deal that became known as the Salt Lick Reservation controversy. When recapitulating his knowledge of the salt lick arrangement, Jesse Benton wrote that Lewis was "notorious for his mean and sneaking qualities."

Lewis married Margaret Lewis, daughter of William T. Lewis of Tennessee. John Eaton had first married Margaret's sister Myra. Margaret died after a year of marriage. Lewis later married Adelaide Stokes Chambers, daughter of Montfort Stokes of North Carolina.

Lewis assisted James Parton in the publication of his three-volume biography of Jackson by sending him information, letters, and other documents. He died at his home in Nashville.

== Legacy ==
Among historians, Lewis' reputation as a figure of the Jacksonian era is modest at best. Charles G. Sellers classed him as a "crony" of Jackson. Louis R. Harlan described him as a self-important "kitchen Machiavelli" and "conspirator" whose combination of "pomposity and reticence" have left a clouded but generally unfavorable image in the historical record. In 2018, historians Jeanne Heidler and David Heidler described him as a "toady" and stated that even other members of the inner circle "chafed at his tattling, always served up sadly, and his unctuous manner, always perfectly adjusted to fit Jackson's moods."

== Sourcee ==
- Brands, H. W. (2005). Andrew Jackson: His Life and Times. New York: Knopf Doubleday Publishing Group. ISBN 1-4000-3072-2.
- Harlan, Louis R. "Public Career of William Berkeley Lewis," Tennessee Historical Quarterly, 7 (March 1948): 3-37.
- Harlan, Louis R. "Public Career of William Berkeley Lewis (Continued)," Tennessee Historical Quarterly, 7 (June 1948): 118-151.
- Heiskell, Samuel Gordon. Andrew Jackson and Early Tennessee History, 3 vols. Nashville: Ambrose, 1918-21.
- Latner, Richard B. (March 1975). "A New Look at Jacksonian Politics". The Journal of American History. 61 (4): 943. doi:10.2307/1890640. JSTOR 1890640.
- Niven, John (1988). John C. Calhoun and the Price of Union: A Biography. Baton Rouge: LSU Press. ISBN 978-0-8071-1858-0.
- Parton, James (1860). Life of Andrew Jackson, Volume 3. New York, NY: Mason Brothers.
- Ratner, Lorman. Andrew Jackson and His Tennessee Lieutenants: A Study in Political Culture, 1997
- Remini, Robert V. (1981). Andrew Jackson and the Course of American Freedom, 1822–1832. New York: Harper & Row Publishers, Inc. ISBN 978-0-8018-5913-7.
- Sellers, Charles G. (June 1954). "Banking and Politics in Jackson's Tennessee, 1817–1827". The Mississippi Valley Historical Review. 41 (1): 61–84. doi:10.2307/1898150.
