= William Hawkins Polk =

American politician (1815–1862)

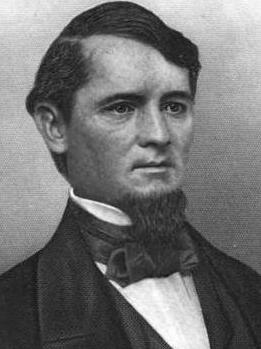

Member of the U.S. House of Representatives from Tennessee's 6th district
- In office March 4, 1851 – March 3, 1853
- Preceded by: James H. Thomas
- Succeeded by: George W. Jones

United States Minister to the Two Sicilies
- In office July 24, 1845 – May 11, 1847
- President: James K. Polk
- Preceded by: William Boulware
- Succeeded by: John Rowan

Member of the Tennessee House of Representatives
- In office 1841–1845

Personal details
- Born: May 24, 1815 Maury County, Tennessee, U.S.
- Died: December 16, 1862 (aged 47) Nashville, Tennessee, C.S.
- Resting place: Greenwood Cemetery; Columbia, Tennessee, U.S.
- Party: Independent Democrat
- Spouse(s): Belinda G. Dickenson Polk; Mary Louisa Corse Polk; Lucy Eugenia Williams Polk
- Children: Hester Malinda Polk Qualls; James Knox Polk; William H. Polk, Jr. Tasker Polk
- Parent(s): Samuel Polk; Jane Knox
- Education: University of North Carolina; University of Tennessee
- Profession: lawyer, diplomat, politician
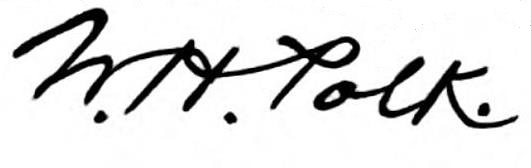
- Signature

Military service
- Branch/service: United States Army
- Years of service: 1847–1848
- Rank: Major
- Unit: 3rd U.S. Dragoons
- Battles/wars: Mexican–American War

William Hawkins Polk (May 24, 1815 – December 16, 1862) was an American politician and a member of the United States House of Representatives for Tennessee's 6th congressional district from 1851 to 1853. He was the younger brother of President James K. Polk. Prior to his election to Congress, he had been a member of the Tennessee House of Representatives (1841–1845), served as U.S. Minister to the Kingdom of the Two Sicilies (1845–1847), and fought as a major in the Mexican–American War.

At the outbreak of the Civil War, Polk supported the Union. He ran for Governor of Tennessee in 1861, but lost to the secessionist incumbent, Isham G. Harris.

== Early life ==
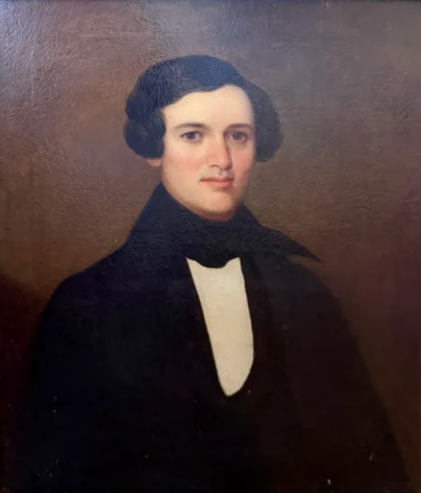
A young William painted between the 1830s-1840s

Polk was born in Maury County, Tennessee, the ninth of ten children of Samuel Polk and Jane (Knox) Polk. He attended the public schools of Columbia, and the University of North Carolina in 1832 and 1833. He graduated from the University of Tennessee at Knoxville, studied law, was admitted to the bar in 1839, and commenced practice in Columbia.

Polk engaged in reckless behavior as a youth that his family found troubling. He was described as a spendthrift prone to "extravagance" and "light amusements." A letter from his brother, James K. Polk, warned him, "you are getting into habits that must inevitably destroy you."

In 1838, William H. Polk killed Robert Hayes, a young Nashville lawyer, following an altercation at the Nelson House in Columbia. The two had apparently been arguing when Polk insulted Hayes, and Hayes responded by throwing a cup at Polk. Polk then obtained a whip and lashed Hayes with it, prompting Hayes to flee. Shortly afterward, Hayes attempted to ambush Polk with a derringer, but his lone shot missed. Polk drew his own gun and returned fire, killing Hayes. Polk was tried for murder, but convicted of lesser charges of assault, and sentenced to six weeks in jail and a $750 fine. He was defended at trial by his brother's former law partner, Gideon Pillow.

Polk was elected to Maury County's seat in the Tennessee House of Representatives in 1841. When Burchet Douglass resigned as Speaker of the House, Polk had every Democratic vote for the position but lost 33 votes to 37 to Whig Franklin Buchanan. His brother, the incumbent governor, had been defeated for reelection that same year. William H. Polk was reelected to a second term in 1843.

== Ambassadorship ==
On March 13, 1845, William H. Polk was appointed chargé d'affaires to the Kingdom of the Two Sicilies by his brother, who had just been elected president. After being brought up to speed on conditions in the kingdom by the new Secretary of State, James Buchanan, Polk arrived in Naples, the kingdom's capital, on July 18, 1845, and was received by the Prince of Scilla, the kingdom's foreign affairs minister, on July 24. Throughout his brief term, Polk would rely on the advice of longtime U.S. Consul to Naples, Alexander Hammett.

Polk's primary goal was to negotiate a commercial treaty that would allow the United States to trade with the kingdom on the same terms as Britain, France, and Spain, whose imports to the kingdom received lower tariff rates. Three attempts to negotiate such a treaty—the first by Auguste Davezac in 1833, the second by Enos Throop in 1838, and the third by Polk's predecessor, William Boulware, in 1841—had all failed. Hammett had warned Polk that the kingdom was very protective of its Naples tobacco market, leaving Polk concerned that a treaty might not be possible unless he offered a quid pro quo for the tobacco tariff reductions. Buchanan instructed Polk to focus on obtaining any treaty, no matter how minimal, that would put the U.S. on an equal footing with Britain, France and Spain.

Treaty negotiations began on November 28, 1845, with Polk meeting with the representatives of King Ferdinand II: Don Giustino Fortunato, Don Michele Gravina, and Don Antonio Spinelli. An agreement was reached after three days, and a copy of the proposed treaty was transmitted to Washington on December 1. While the treaty wasn't as favorable as the U.S. had hoped, it did outline rules regarding duties on tonnage and purchase imports, and rights regarding navigation, shipwrecks, movement of citizens, and asylum. The treaty was ratified in April 1846. It remained in effect until a new treaty was negotiated by the Pierce Administration in 1855.

In a January 1847 dispatch, Polk warned of deteriorating conditions in the kingdom, some of which would fuel the political upheavals of the following year. He reported the failure of the year's grain crop, and noted this would certainly cause an increase in food prices, which were already high. He also reported growing restlessness and anti-Bourbon sentiment among the kingdom's lower classes. He suggested the United States might boost its image by providing increased food shipments to Western Europe.

After the outbreak of the Mexican–American War, Polk requested a leave of absence (which eventually became a resignation). He transferred his authority to Hammett, and left Naples in May 1847.

== Mexican–American War ==
In August 1847, Polk joined the Third Regiment of United States Dragoons with the rank of major. This unit, commanded by Colonel Edward G.W. Butler, was one of several temporary regiments created to augment the regular army's war efforts. Polk was one of two majors in the regiment, the other being Lewis Cass, Jr., the son of Senator Lewis Cass.

Polk and the Third Dragoons took part in General Joseph Lane's pursuit of General Santa Anna in January 1848, and Lane's campaign against the guerrilla forces of Padre Jarauta in late February 1848. Polk and a portion of Lane's forces engaged and defeated the Jarauta guerrillas at Zacualtipan on February 25, 1848.

In late May 1848, two companies under Polk's command escorted an American delegation to Querétaro, where the two countries exchanged official ratifications of the Treaty of Guadalupe Hidalgo, bringing the war to an end.

== Congress and other political activities ==
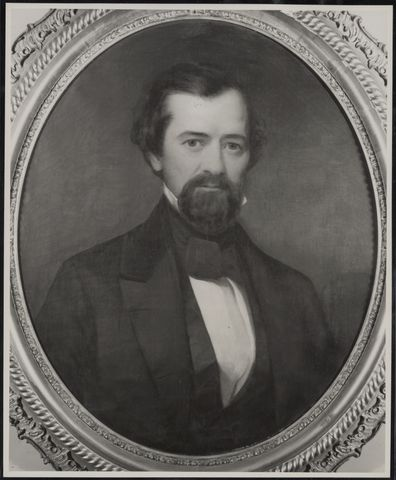
Polk, painted between 1855-1862 by William Garl Browne Jr.

In 1850, Polk was a delegate to the Nashville Convention, a gathering of Southern representatives to plot strategy regarding the expansion of slavery in territories acquired during the Mexican–American War. In an attempt to counter the secessionist efforts of Fire-Eaters at the convention, Polk, a leader of the moderate Democrats, submitted resolutions that would allow the Southern states to accept the Compromise of 1850. He would campaign in favor of the Compromise of 1850 in subsequent years, seeing it as the only means of preserving the Union.

In 1851, Polk challenged the Democratic incumbent, James H. Thomas, for the party's nomination for the 6th district's seat in the U.S. House of Representatives. Failing in this, he ran against Thomas in the general election as an Independent Democrat, winning by a small margin. While in Congress, he opposed any attempts to tamper with or modify the Fugitive Slave Act, and opposed the promotion of General Winfield Scott, recalling Scott's earlier attacks against Andrew Jackson. After the Whig-dominated state legislature gerrymandered his district, Polk declined to seek reelection in 1853.

Polk returned to his law practice after leaving Congress, but remained politically active. During the presidential election of 1856, Polk was nominated as an at-large elector for his old State Department boss, James Buchanan, who was the Democratic nominee for president. His chief opponent in the canvass was future congressman Horace Maynard, who was an elector for Millard Fillmore. In 1857, Polk was elected to Maury County's seat in the Tennessee House of Representatives, defeating an independent candidate, William S. Bassford, 1,669 votes to 676.

Polk again sought the 6th district's seat in the U.S. House of Representatives in 1859, and spent several weeks battling his old foe, James H. Thomas, for the Democratic Party nomination. Fearing their squabble would cost the party the seat in the general election, Polk withdrew from the race in August.

== Civil War ==
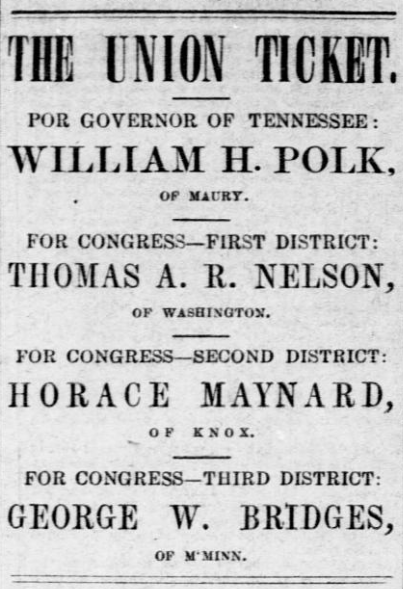
Newspaper ad for the Union ticket, July 1861

Polk persistently campaigned against secession during the growing sectional strife in the late 1850s, delivering sixty speeches, according to one source, in favor of remaining in the Union. During the 1860 presidential election, Polk campaigned as an elector for the Northern Democratic candidate, Stephen Douglas. He canvassed the state with his opponents Horace Maynard (elector for John Bell) and Landon Carter Haynes (elector for John C. Breckinridge), frequently engaging in tense debates.

In January 1861, after South Carolina had seceded following the election of Abraham Lincoln, Polk remained steadfast in his support for the Union. In a letter to a friend, he argued that Tennessee should not follow the path of South Carolina and submit itself to a "yoke shaped in an hour of madness and folly by political desperadoes." Following the attack on Fort Sumter in April 1861, however, Polk, like many Middle Tennessee Unionists, modified his position, stating that Tennessee must defend itself if federal troops invaded. He continued to waffle on the issue of secession in subsequent weeks.

In May 1861, Polk chaired the state convention of the Union Party, which had been formed by ex-Whigs and pro-Union Democrats in hopes of stemming the rising secessionist furor led by Governor Isham G. Harris. This convention offered its gubernatorial nomination to former governor William B. Campbell, but Campbell declined. A second, smaller convention nominated Polk as a last-minute candidate.

During the campaign, Polk announced he was in favor of Tennessee joining the Confederacy. He was criticized by secessionists, nevertheless, for not speaking up in favor of separation sooner, and for earlier attacks on Confederate president Jefferson Davis. By the time the campaign had gotten underway, East Tennessee was threatening to withdraw from the state and join the Union, and Polk campaigned as the candidate best suited to reconcile East Tennessee with the rest of the state. He attacked Harris for ordering troops into East Tennessee, arguing the move only served to inflame already-heightened tensions in the region. William G. Brownlow, a leader of the state's Unionists, reluctantly endorsed Polk as a lesser of two evils. On election day, Harris won in a landslide, 74,973 votes to 43,342.

In the months following the election, Polk traveled to Washington to champion causes for the state's Unionists, including advocating the confiscation of the property of Confederates. In June 1862, after the Union Army had recaptured Nashville, he spoke at a Unionist convention in the city. In September 1862, Polk joined the staff of Union Army general Thomas L. Crittenden.

After a trip to the Northern states in late 1862, Polk fell ill while staying at the St. Cloud Hotel in Nashville. He died suddenly on December 16, 1862. His sister-in-law, former First Lady Sarah Childress Polk, arranged for his body to be taken to Columbia (which was still behind enemy lines) under a flag of truce for burial. He is interred at Columbia's Greenwood Cemetery.

== Family ==
Polk married Belinda G. Dickenson on April 18, 1837, in Maury County, Tennessee, and she died on March 26, 1844, in Nashville, Tennessee. He married Mary Louisa Corse on June 29, 1847, in New York City. She died on April 2, 1851. He married Lucy Eugenia Williams on July 14, 1854, in Montmorenci, North Carolina.

Diplomatic posts
Preceded by William Boulware	United States Ambassador (as Chargé d'Affaires) to the Two Sicilies; 1845–1847	Succeeded by John Rowan
U.S. House of Representatives
Preceded by James H. Thomas	Member of the U.S. House of Representatives from Tennessee's 6th congressional district 1851–1853	Succeeded by George W. Jones
