= Battle of Guanajuato =

Part of the French intervention in Mexico

- Part of the Second French intervention in Mexico
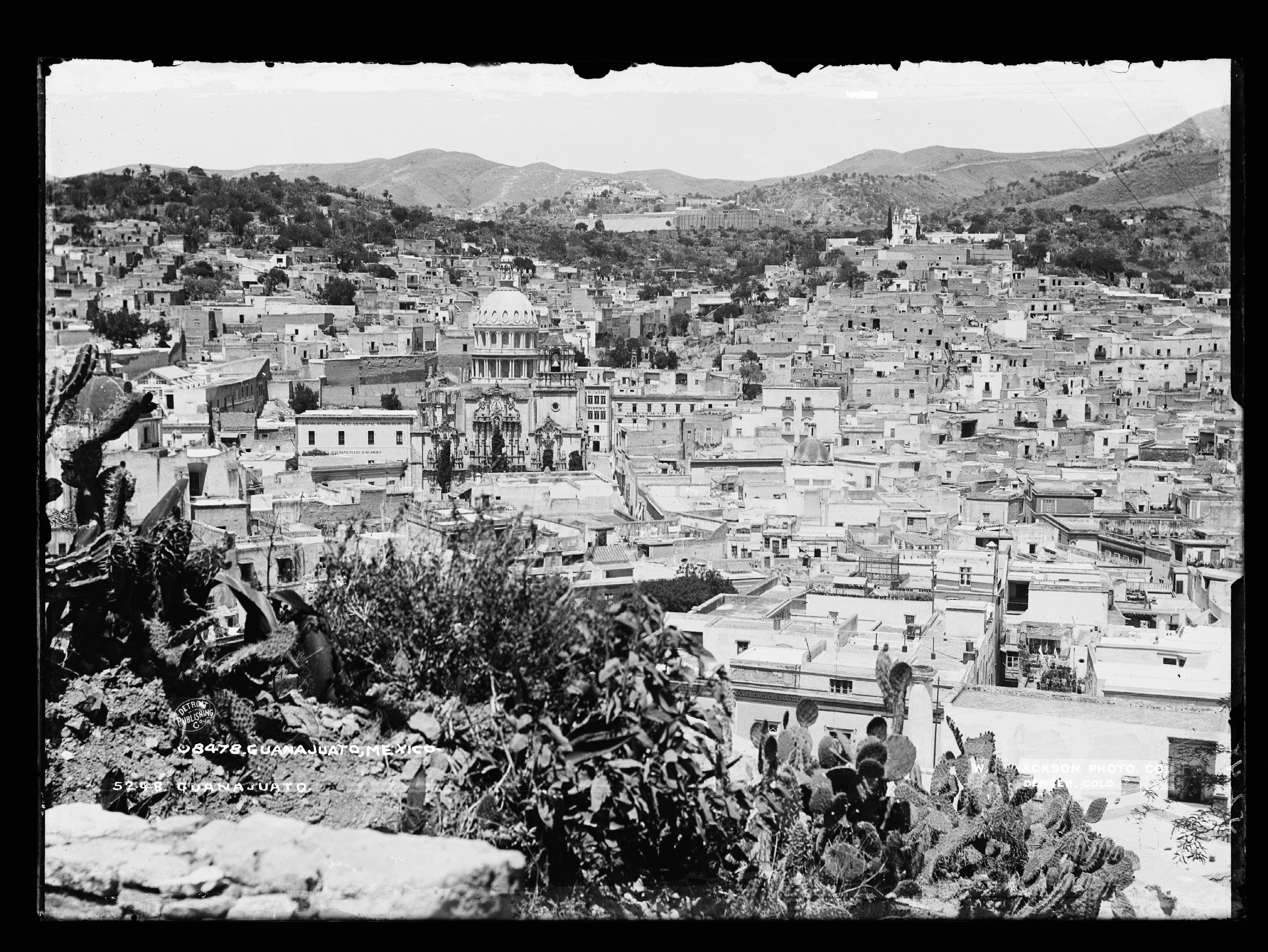
- Guanajuato City, c.1880
Date	8 December 1863; 162 years ago
Location	Guanajuato City, Guanajuato, Mexico 21.017273°N 101.253098°W
Result	Imperialist victory

Belligerents
Mexico	(Mexico) Mexican Empire; French Empire

Commanders and leaders
Manuel Doblado	François A. Bazaine; Félix Douay; Armand de Castagny

Strength
22 Cannons; 252 Soldiers	16 Cannons; 484 Soldiers

Casualties and losses
15 Cannons Captured; 90 killed 50 wounded Total: 140 men	10 Cannons Damaged; 210 killed & wounded Total: 210 men

The Battle of Guanajuato (Spanish: Toma de Guanajuato; French: Bataille de Guanajuato), also known as the Fall of Guanajuato took place on 8 December 1863, during the second French intervention in Mexico. Imperialist troops under the command of François Achille Bazaine, with him the greater portion of General Douay's division as well as that of General de Castagny, took the City of Guanajuato after heavy resistance from the Republicans. The Imperialists were in pursuit of Manuel Doblado, the Minister of Foreign Affairs for the Republican government.

Guanajuato was a significant city due to its strategic location and economic importance, particularly its rich mining wealth. Mexican Republican forces controlled the city, but they were outnumbered and poorly supplied compared to the French army.

== Background ==
Initially, the French invaded Mexico in January 1862, but their advance to the Capital was stopped and delayed a year after the historic Mexican Republican Victory over the Imperialists at Puebla on May 5.

10 months later, in early March 1863, the French began their second attempt to take the capital, which they successfully did in June, installing Maximilian I as Emperor of the newly proclaimed Mexican Empire.

After the French took Mexico City, they began preparing to launch a military campaign into Central Mexico, where Benito Juarez went into exile. French forces advanced North from Mexico City inland to weaken the Mexican Republican government.

=== Central Mexico Campaign ===
In the days leading up to the battle, French troops advanced toward Guanajuato after securing several nearby cities in central Mexico. On 19 November, the French captured Querétaro City, Querétaro. On 24 November, French General Armand Alexandre de Castagny captured Acámbaro, Guanajuato, On 30 November, Alfredo Berthelin captured Morelia, Michoacan.

=== Battle ===
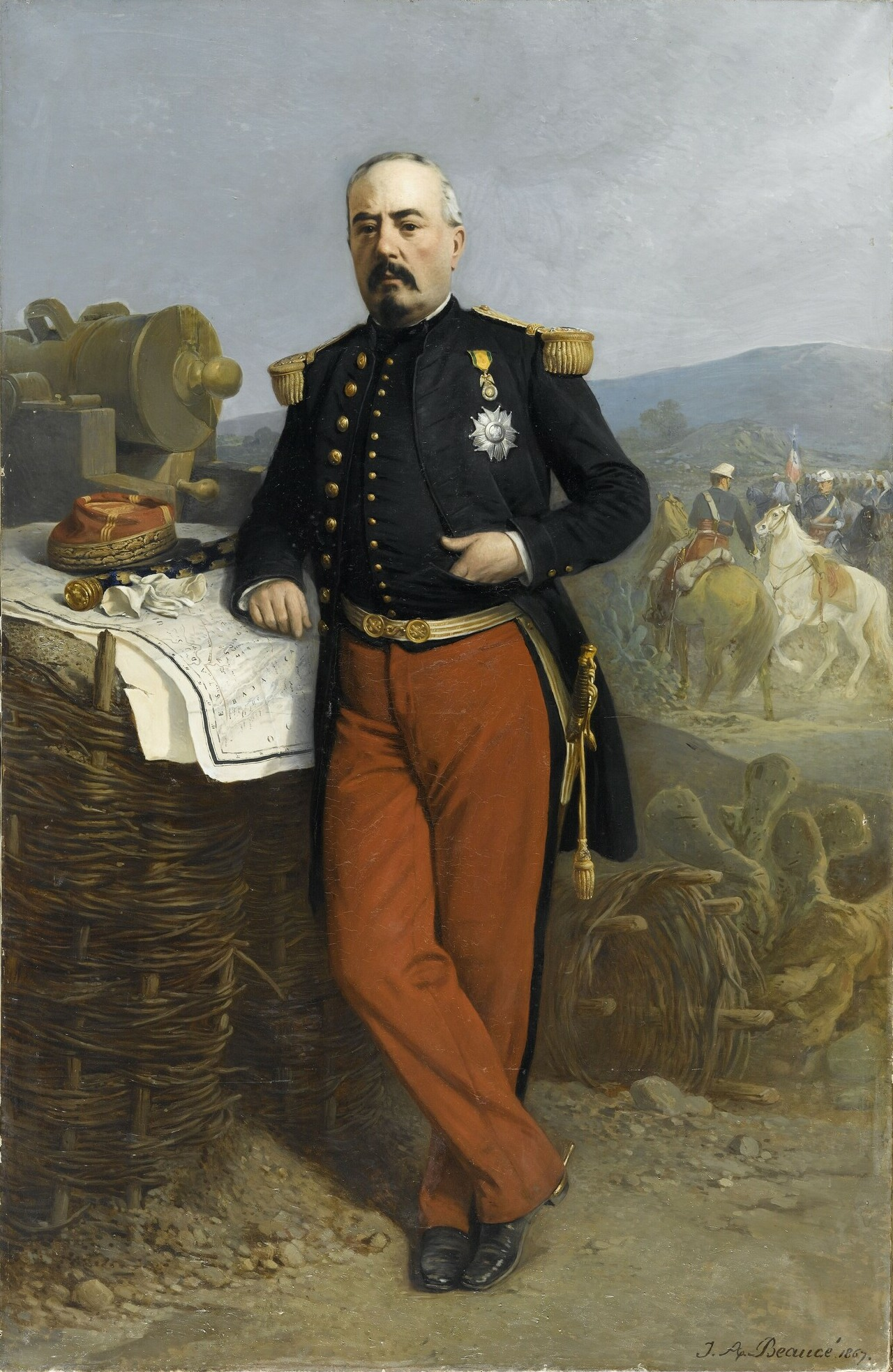
General Bazaine commanded the Imperialist troops during the battle

The Republican defenders were aware of the approaching enemy but faced serious disadvantages. They were outnumbered, had limited ammunition, and lacked heavy artillery. Many defenders were local militias rather than professional soldiers.

When the French forces reached the outskirts of the city, they surrounded Guanajuato to cut off escape routes and reinforcements. The attack began with artillery bombardments, which targeted defensive positions and caused damage to buildings within the city. This weakened the Mexican defensive lines and created confusion among the defenders.

As the bombardment continued, French infantry advanced into the city, engaging in close combat in Guanajuato's narrow streets. Mexican Republican forces attempted to defend key positions such as high ground, public buildings, and road entrances, using barricades and urban cover. Despite determined resistance, the defenders struggled to hold their positions due to their inferior weapons and lack of supplies.

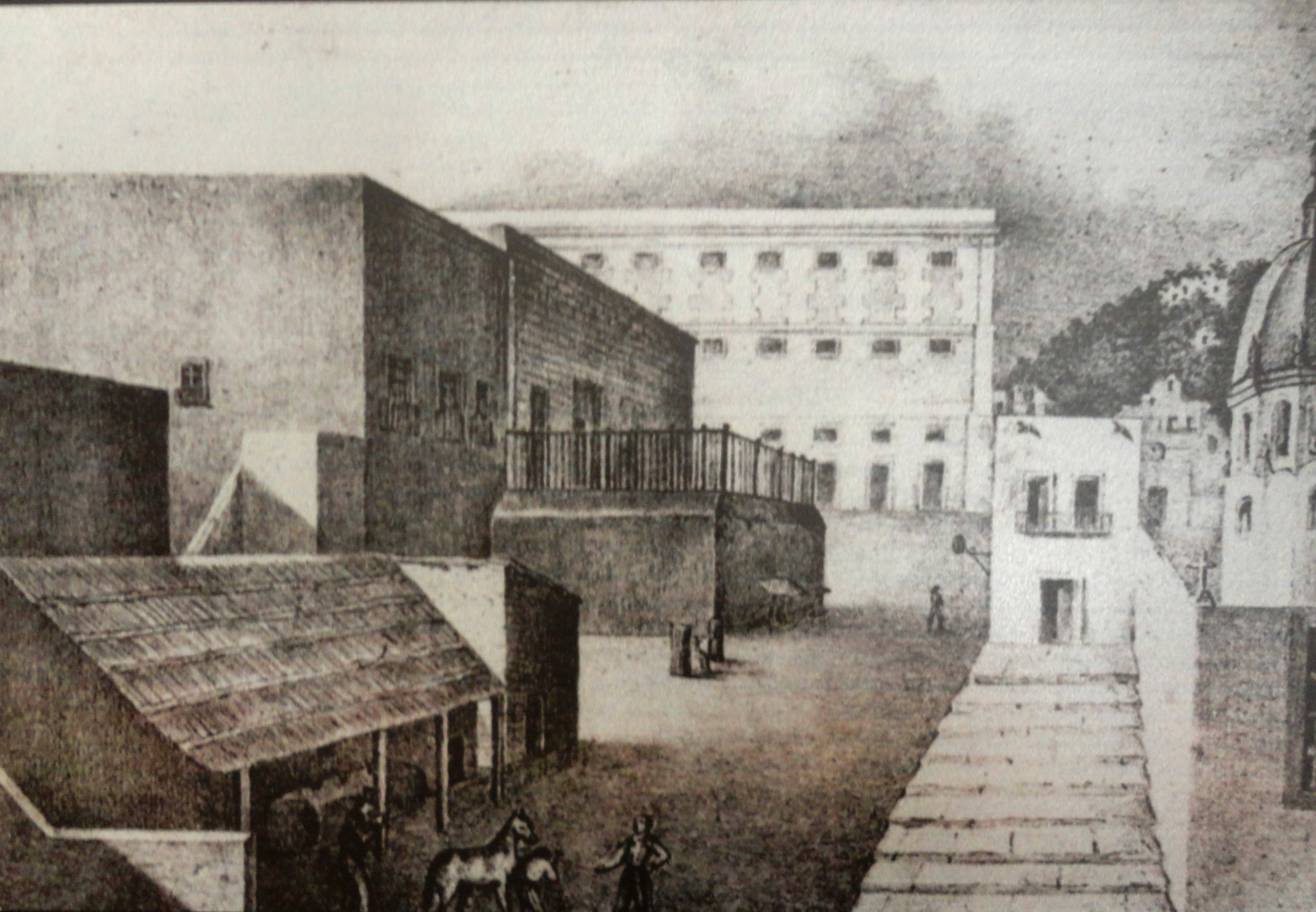
Alhóndiga de Granaditas was a site of the Battle of Guanajuato

After several hours of fighting, French troops broke through the main defensive points. With casualties mounting and no reinforcements arriving, Mexican commanders ordered a retreat to avoid total destruction or capture. By the end of the day on December 8, 1863, Guanajuato had fallen into French hands.

The capture of Guanajuato was a major victory for the French, as it strengthened their control over central Mexico and disrupted Republican supply lines. It also further weakened Juárez's government and helped the French advance toward consolidating power. Although the city was lost, Mexican resistance continued elsewhere, especially through guerrilla warfare.

=== Aftermath ===
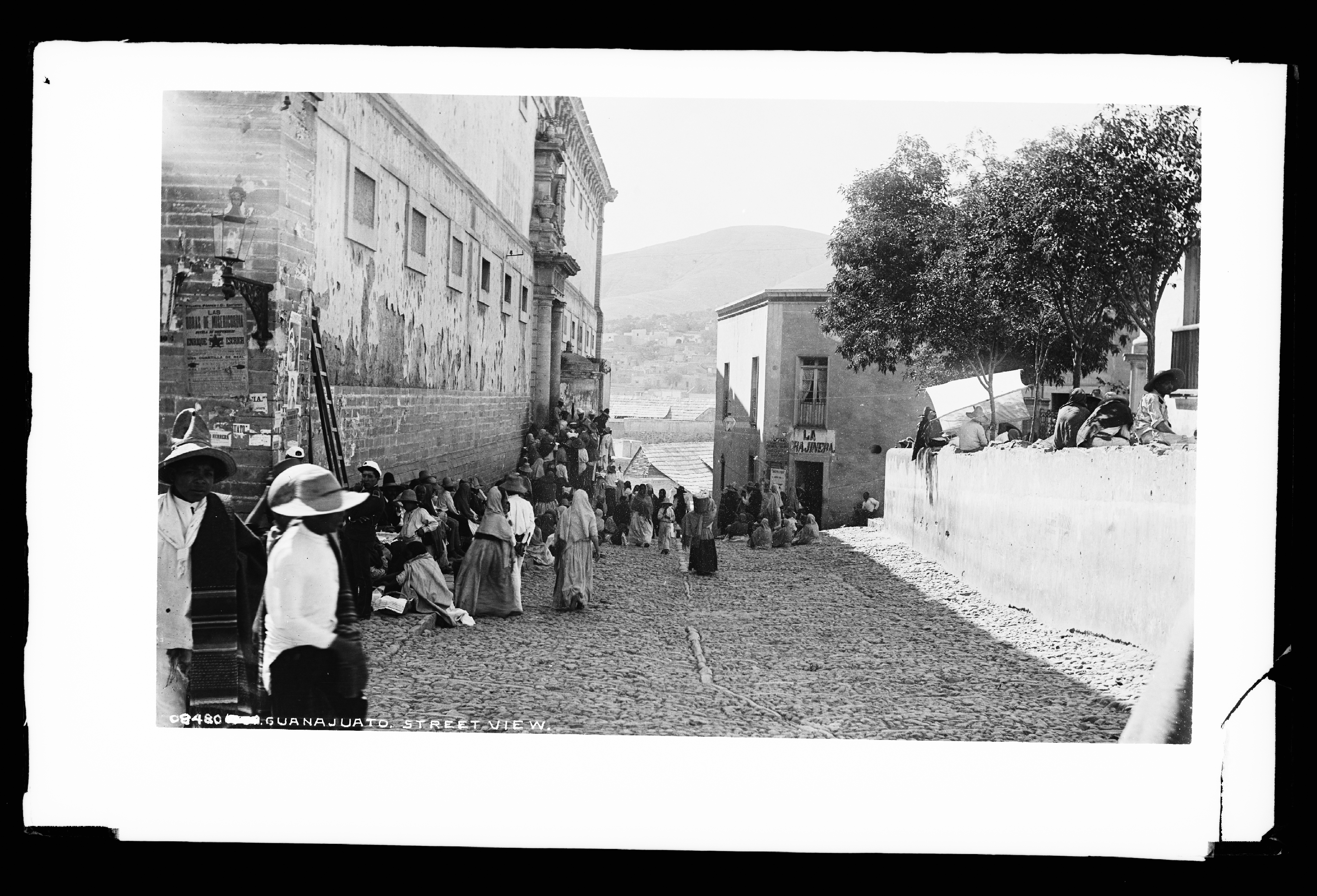
Guanajuato City street in the 19th Century

After the City fell to the Imperialists, the French advanced to the city of San Luis Potosí, where Benito Juárez moved the national capital after the Fall of Mexico City in June. The Imperialists took the remaining Cities of San Luis Potosí on December 27 and Guadalajara on January 5, 1864, absorbing them into the expanding Mexican Empire, culminating the Central Mexico Campaign.

Mexican Imperialist General Tomás Mejía was left in command of the city by Bazaine for a brief time after the fall of the city.

A few years later, during the years of 1866 & 1867 after victorious battles against the Imperialists, the republicans were able to repulse the Imperialists from Mexico after the American Government, who had ended their American Civil War in April 1865 supplied the Mexican Republicans to get the French out of North America culminating in June 1867 after the two month Siege of the city and execution of the Emperor in Querétaro.

== See also ==
- List of battles of the French intervention in Mexico
- Capture of Alhóndiga de Granaditas 1810 Guanajuato City Battle
