= 3rd Regiment of Dragoons =

3rd Regiment of Dragoons may refer to:

- 3rd Dragoon Guards
- 3rd The King's Own Hussars, formerly known as 3rd (The King's Own) Regiment of (Light) Dragoons
- 3rd Dragoon Regiment (France)
- 3rd Continental Light Dragoons
- 3rd U.S. Dragoons
