= Henry Bryan =

Henry Bryan may refer to:

- Henry Hunter Bryan (1786–1835), U.S. Representative from Tennessee
- Henry Francis Bryan (1865–1944), United States Navy admiral and governor of American Samoa
