= Franklin Buchanan (politician) =

American politician

Tennessee House of Representatives
- In office 1837–1838

Tennessee House of Representatives
- In office 1839–1840

Tennessee House of Representatives
- In office 1841–1842

Speaker of the Tennessee House of Representatives
- In office 1842–1843

Speaker of the Tennessee House of Representatives
- In office 1847–1848

Personal details
- Born: 1812 Giles County, Tennessee
- Died: March 1851 (aged 38–39) Monroe County, Mississippi
- Party: Whig

Franklin Buchanan (1812 – March 1851) was a farmer and politician in Tennessee. He served multiple terms in the Tennessee House of Representatives starting in 1837 including as Speaker of the Tennessee House of Representatives.

== Biography ==
Buchanan was born 1812 in Giles County, Tennessee. From 1827, aged 15, until 1831 he worked in the counties office of the clerk. He married Adelaide Simonton in 1831 and became a farmer, and together they had 10 children including in 1837 James M. Buchanan a soldier, farmer and merchant in Mississippi.

He was elected to serve in the Tennessee House of Representatives starting in 1837 in Tennessee's 22nd General Assembly, he represented Lawrence County in the house. He was elected again in August 1839, as a Whig, to represent Lawrence. He won again in 1841 for his third session. When Burchet Douglass resigned as Speaker of the House, Buchanan was elected as the new speaker 37 votes to 33 over William Hawkins Polk. Buchanan was elected again in 1847. He was nominated by representative Felix A. Parker for Speaker over representative William M. Blakemore and won by a vote of 40 to 30. He campaigned for the sixth congressional district seat in 1849 but lost to James H. Thomas.

He moved to Monroe County, Mississippi in 1850 where he died in March 1851.
