= 3rd U.S. Dragoons =

The 3rd U.S. Regiment of Dragoons was a United States Army Dragoon regiment raised for one year of service in the Mexican–American War, by Congress on February 11, 1847. It was led by Colonel Edward G. W. Butler, who was appointed from Louisiana.

== Service Record ==
The 3rd Regiment of Dragoons was assigned to the expedition to Central Mexico, landing near Vera Cruz with Major General Winfield Scott's army and participating in the Siege of Vera Cruz, Battle of Churubusco and the Battle of Molino del Rey. The Third Dragoons took part in General Joseph Lane's pursuit of General Santa Anna in January 1848, and Lane's campaign against the guerrilla forces of Joaquín Rea at the action of Atlixco and of Padre Jarauta in late February 1848.

Major William H. Polk and a portion of Lane's forces engaged and defeated the Jarauta guerrillas in the action of Sequalteplan at Zacualtipan on February 25, 1848. In late May 1848, two companies under Polk's command escorted an American delegation to Querétaro, where the two countries exchanged official ratifications of the Treaty of Guadalupe Hidalgo, bringing the war to an end.

At the end of the war the regiment was disbanded.

== Officers ==
- Colonel Edward G. W. Butler, born in La., apt. from La.
- Lieutenant Colonel Thomas P. Moore, born in Va., apt. from Ky.
- Majors

Lewis Cass, Jr., born in O., apt. from Mich.
William H. Polk, " Tenn., apt. from Tenn.

- Surgeon E. H. Burton, born in Md., apt. from La.
- Asst. Surgeons

F. J. Kobertson, born in Tenn., apt. from Tenn.
Coryon S. Abell, born in N. Y., apt. from Ky.

- Captains

George W. Caldwell, born in N. C, apt. from N. C.
John Butler, born in Pa., apt. from Pa.
Edgar B. Gaither, born in Ky., apt. from Ky.
Lemuel Ford, born in Va., apt. from Ind.
John S. Sitgreaves, born in N. C, apt. from N. C.
Alphonse M. Duperu, born in Va., apt. from La.
Richard T. Merrick, born in Md., apt. from Md.
James Hogan, born in Ire., apt. from Ala.
Andrew T. McReynolds, born in Ire., apt. from Mich.
Walter H. Jenifer, born in Md., apt. from Md.

- First Lieutenants

Daniel Petigru, born in S. C, apt. from S. C.
S. M. B. Vance, born in Pa., apt. from Pa.
Rodolph Schoonover, born in Pa., apt. from Ind.
George J. Adde, born in Va., apt. from Va.
Joseph A. Divver, born in N. Y., apt. from N. Y.
George E. Maney, born in Tenn., apt. from Tenn.
John T. Brown, born in N. Y., apt. from Mich.
William B. Cook, born in Va., apt. from Ala.
Edward C. Davidson, born in N. C, apt. from N. C.
William Walker, born in Ala., apt. from Ala.

- Second Lieutenants

Herman Thorn, born in N. Y., apt. from N. Y.
J. C. D. Williams, born in Mich., apt. from Mich.
William C. Wagley, born in Ky., apt. from Ky.
Joseph H. Maddox, born in Md., apt. from Md.
John K. Harrison, born in N. C., apt. from N. C.
William J. McGill, born in S. C., apt. from S. C.
Francis Y. Gaines, born in Ala., apt. from Ala.
Francis Henry, born in Ill., apt. from Wis.
Langdon C. Johnson, born in S. C., apt. from S. C.
Charles Radziminski, born in Pol., apt. from La.
John V. S. Haviland, born in Pa., apt. from Pa.
James J. Moore, born in Ky., apt. from Ky.
Edward McPherson, born in Md., apt. from Md.
William Merrihew, born in Mass., apt. from N. Y.
William Blood, born in N. Y., apt. from Ind.
W. G. Moseley, born in N. C., apt. from Fla.
John W. Martin, born in Va., apt. from Va.
R. E. Haslitt, born in Md., apt. from Md.
Andrew J. Dorn, born in ?, apt. from
Elisha E. Camp, born in ?, apt. from Army
