= James B. Reynolds =

American politician

Member of the U.S. House of Representatives from Tennessee
- In office March 4, 1815 – March 4, 1817
- Preceded by: Parry W. Humphreys
- Succeeded by: George W. L. Marr
- Constituency: 6th district
- In office March 4, 1823 – March 4, 1825
- Preceded by: District established
- Succeeded by: John H. Marable
- Constituency: 8th district

Personal details
- Born: 1779 County Antrim, Kingdom of Ireland
- Died: June 10, 1851 (aged 71–72) Clarksville, Tennessee, U.S.
- Party: Democratic-Republican
- Profession: Lawyer; politician

James B. Reynolds (1779 – June 10, 1851) was an American politician who represented Tennessee in the United States House of Representatives.

== Biography ==
Reynolds was born in County Antrim in the Kingdom of Ireland in 1779. He attended the common schools and immigrated to the United States in 1798. In 1804 he settled in Clarksville, Tennessee, and studied law. He was admitted to bar the same year.

== Career ==
Reynolds was elected as a Democratic-Republican to the Fourteenth Congress, which lasted from March 4, 1815, to March 3, 1817. He was also elected to the Eighteenth Congress, which lasted from March 4, 1823, to March 3, 1825. He resumed the practice of law after each office. In 1835, Reynolds was a shareholder when The Branch Bank of Planters Bank, headquartered in Nashville, opened in Clarksville, Tennessee.

== Death ==
Reynolds died in Clarksville on June 10, 1851, at about age 71 years. He is interred at the Riverside Cemetery in Clarksville, Tennessee, alongside family members Joseph Reynolds and Bridget McCue.

U.S. House of Representatives
Preceded by Parry W. Humphreys	Member of the U.S. House of Representatives from Tennessee's 6th congressional district 1815–1817	Succeeded by George W. L. Marr
Preceded by District created	Member of the U.S. House of Representatives from Tennessee's 8th congressional district 1823–1825	Succeeded by John H. Marable
