= Barclay Martin =

American politician (1802–1890)

Member of the U.S. House of Representatives from Tennessee's 6th district
- In office March 4, 1845 – March 3, 1847
- Preceded by: Aaron V. Brown
- Succeeded by: James H. Thomas

Member of the Tennessee House of Representatives
- In office 1839–1840; 1847–1849; 1851–1853

Member of the Tennessee Senate
- In office 1841–1843

Personal details
- Born: December 17, 1802 Edgefield County, South Carolina
- Died: November 8, 1890 (aged 87) Columbia, Tennessee
- Party: Democratic Party
- Profession: lawyer; politician

Barclay Martin (December 17, 1802 – November 8, 1890) was an American politician and a member of the United States House of Representatives for Tennessee's 6th congressional district.

== Biography ==
Martin was born in Edgefield County, South Carolina on December 17, 1802. He moved to Bourbon County, Kentucky with his parents in 1804 and to Bedford County, Tennessee in 1806. He pursued an academic course and moved to Columbia, Tennessee in Maury County. He studied law, was admitted to the bar, and began his practice.

== Career ==
In 1839 and 1840, Martin was a member of the Tennessee House of Representatives, and he served in the Tennessee Senate from 1841 to 1843.

Elected as a member of the Democratic Party to the Twenty-ninth Congress, Martin served from March 4, 1845, to March 3, 1847. He resumed the practice of his profession and again served in the Tennessee House of Representatives from 1847 to 1849 and from 1851 to 1853. He was a member of the board of trustees of the Columbia Athenaeum, which served as the rectory for the Columbia Female Institute, from 1852 until his death.

== Death ==
Martin died in Columbia, Tennessee on November 8, 1890, and is interred at Zion Cemetery.

U.S. House of Representatives
Preceded by Aaron V. Brown	Member of the U.S. House of Representatives from Tennessee's 6th congressional district 1845–1847	Succeeded by James H. Thomas
