= Andrew T. McReynolds =

American lawyer

Andrew Thomas McReynolds
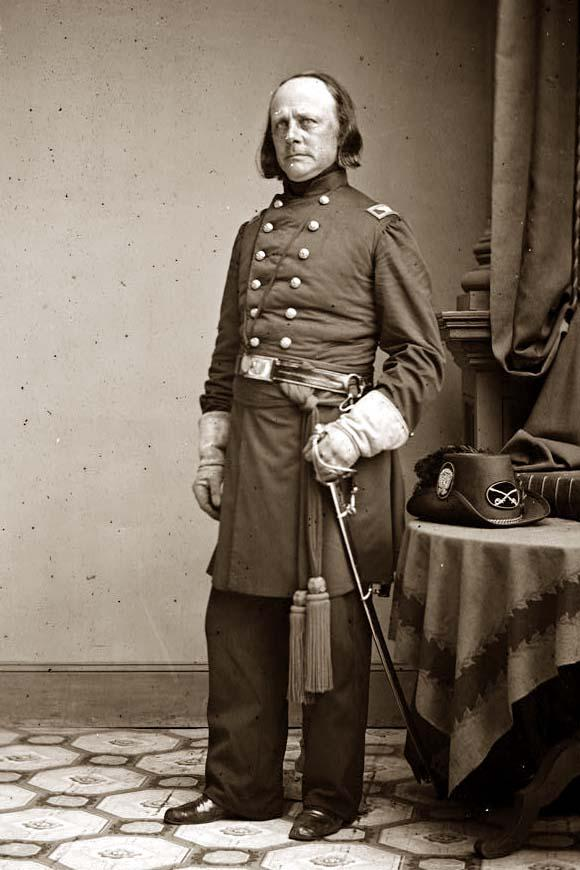
- Born: December 25, 1808; Dungannon, County Tyrone, United Kingdom
- Died: November 26, 1898 (aged 89); Muskegon, Michigan, United States
- Burial place: Fulton Street Cemetery, Grand Rapids, Michigan, United States
- Spouse: Elizabeth Morgan Brewster (m. 1835–1891)
- Military career
- Allegiance: United States (Union)
- Branch: United States Army (Union Army)
- Service years: 1832 – 1848; 1861 – 1864
- Rank: Colonel
- Unit: 3rd U.S. Dragoons
- Commands: 1st New York Cavalry Regiment
- Conflicts: Mexican–American War: Mexico City Campaign; Battle of Contreras; Battle of Churubusco (WIA); American Civil War: Maryland campaign; Battle of Antietam
- Other work: Lawyer

Andrew Thomas McReynolds (December 25, 1808 – November 26, 1898) was an American colonel and lawyer of Irish origin who commanded the 1st New York Cavalry Regiment during the American Civil War and later served as Prosecuting Attorney of Muskegon County in 1874.

== Biography ==
=== Family and immigration ===
Andrew was born on Christmas Day, 1808, as the son of John McReynolds and Ann Sloan. He was also a cousin of Andrew Jackson and his grandfather was a lawyer of consummate ability and a sheriff of Tyrone County. After his father's death, he inherited his fortune and decided to move to New York in 1830 before ultimately settling in Detroit in 1833. He then married Elizabeth Morgan Brewster on 1835 before beginning to pursue for a legal career.

=== Life in Michigan ===
Having an interest ever since his days in Ireland, McReynolds was interested in politics and was elected as city alderman after 4 years of being in Detroit. In 1839 he was chosen one of the delegates to the Harrisburg Whig convention, which nominated William Henry Harrison. Despite this setback however, McReynolds was still a prominent figure within the politics of Michigan. McReynolds represented Wayne County in the Michigan House of Representatives in 1840, nominated by the Whigs. McReynolds would later become a Democrat. In terms of his military career, McReynolds began his military service by enlisting in the Pittsburg Company, part of the Michigan militia in 1832. In 1847, he was a member of the Senate of Michigan, representing the 1st district as a Democrat.

=== Mexican–American War and prelude ===
On March 9, 1847, McReynolds enlisted in the United States Army for the Mexican–American War as a captain in the 3rd U.S. Dragoons and would go on to serve at the Battle of Contreras and the Battle of Churubusco where he got wounded in the left arm; receiving a brevet promotion to Major for his services in those two battles before resigning on August 31, 1848.

When McReynolds returned to Detroit, he became the first captain of the Montgomery Guard. From 1852 to 1854, he was prosecuting attorney for Wayne County, Michigan and in 1859, he moved to Grand Rapids, Michigan and attempted to further his law career but the American Civil War prevented that from occurring.

=== American Civil War ===
After the start of the American Civil War, McReynolds enlisted in the Union Army and was given carte blanche to organize a cavalry regiment anywhere. Abraham Lincoln personally commissioned McReynolds, as cavalry units were badly needed, thus making McReynolds the only Colonel of United States Volunteers to be personally commissioned by Lincoln. He accordingly mustered the 1st New York Cavalry Regiment at New York City Not much is known on his active service during the war besides his service at the Battle of Antietam. McReynolds was mustered out on June 15, 1864, possibly from his tenure expiring.

=== Later years ===
McReynolds returned to Grand Rapids to continue his legal career. Despite his long legal career, due to being Democratic, McReynolds never managed to pursue a major office besides being the prosecutor for Muskegon county from 1874 to 1876. He was also the Deputy of Michigan's Commander in 1880. Despite his old age of 80 years, he was still able to conduct vigorously before retiring on his birthday the same year. McReynolds died on November 26, 1898, and was buried at Fulton Street Cemetery, Grand Rapids.

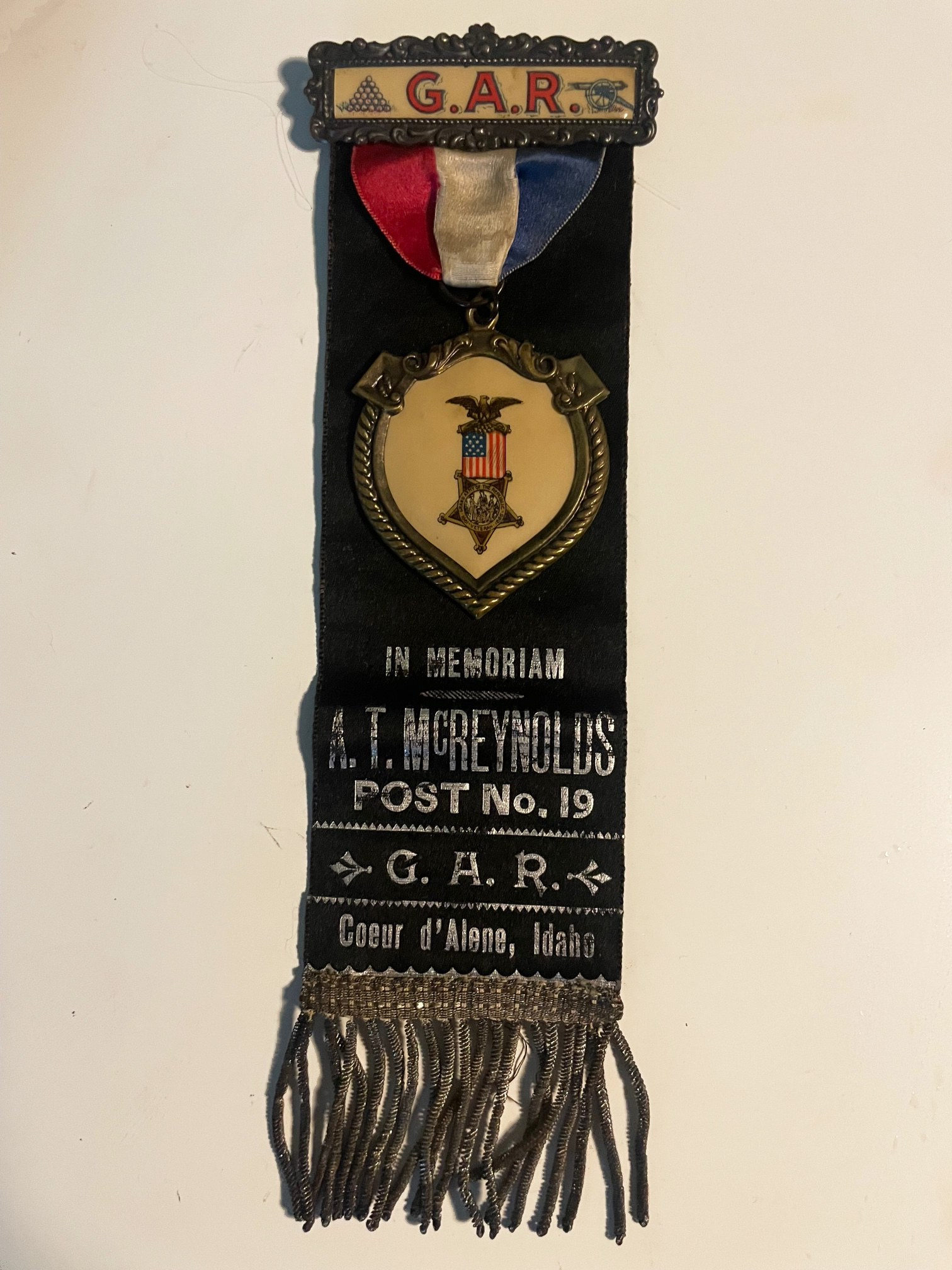
