= Action of Sequalteplan =

Battle in the Mexican-American War

Coordinates: 20°39′00″N 98°39′00″W

- Part of the Mexican–American War
| Date | 25 February 1848 |
| Location | Zacualtipan, Hidalgo |
| Result | American victory |

Belligerents
| United States | Mexico |

Commanders and leaders
| Joseph Lane | Celedonio Dómeco de Jarauta |

Strength
| 250 Texas Rangers; 130 dragoons/mounted rifles | "A considerable force" of infantry & lancers |

Casualties and losses
| 1 killed 6 wounded | 150 killed 50 captured |

The Action of Sequalteplan, on February 25, 1848, was an American victory by a force under Gen. Joseph Lane that defeated a Mexican guerrilla force under Celedonio Dómeco de Jarauta at Zacualtipan. It was the last American expedition against the Mexican guerrillas of Central Mexico in the war.

== Background ==
In early February 1848, the portion of Scott's Army in Mexico City was engaged in collecting money and other assessments for the support of the army in the surrounding area. Mexican guerrillas were still causing difficulty for the American forces, especially to the north and northeast of the capital.

General Joseph Lane was put in command of a force of 250 Texas Rangers under Colonel Hays, 130 3rd Dragoons and Mounted Rifles under Major Polk, and Dominguez' Spy Company tasked with scouring that region of guerillas. Among these guerrillas Padre Jarauta was the most daring and influential of their leaders, having originally harassed the Americans on the roads between Vera Cruz and Jalapa. He was now in the region north of the capital with a "considerable force" of guerrilla infantry and lancer cavalry. It was this force that was the principal target of Lane's force when it left the city on February 17.

Lane marched eastward on the road toward Puebla then doubled back and turned north towards Tulancingo, where spies told him he could find Generals Paredes, Almonte and Padre Jarauta with a considerable force of guerillas. Upon arriving on the 22nd, he found his surprise of the town had failed, Jarauta informed of his approach had marched away three days before. General Paredes had remained but gave them the slip when a party of Americans attempted to capture him at a rancho outside the town on the 23rd.

Soon afterward Lane received word that Jarauta's force had retreated seventy five miles north from Tulancingo to Zacualtipan, (American reports at the time called it Sequalteplan). Lane sent his sick and wounded back to Mexico City under the guard of Dominguez' Spy Company, while he made a forced march, arriving at the city at dawn on the 25th.

== Battle ==
General Lane with Col. Hays' Texas Rangers charged into the town at the head of the column headed to the plaza at its center. A burst of musket fire came from a nearby cuartel occupied by 50 or 60 of Jarauta's men as they approached the plaza. Major Truit, led his men into the barracks where they killed or wounded 24 men and captured 20 others. Meanwhile, the plaza was occupied. Col. Hays with the larger portion of his Rangers attacked a strong detachment of lancers and infantry emerging from a cuartel on a street to their left. They engaged in a running fight with guerillas in the street and firing from behind walls, killing about 30 guerillas. General Lane continued forward beyond the plaza with the rest of the force to attack another detachment of Jarauta's men in another street.

When Hays returned to the plaza he was informed that General Lane was engaged in an intense fight against superior numbers of the enemy, and Hays sent Captain Daggett's Ranger Company to reinforce him. The Mexicans facing Lane fought hard using the cover available but were eventually driven off with a loss of 30 men.

Hays in pursuit of scattered fugitives, met Major Polk with two companies of the 3rd U.S. Dragoons, when they arrived in the suburbs of the town. Hearing firing the Major dismounted Walker's Rifles, and directing them against a cuartel from which the firing was coming. They silenced it, then moved on to a nearby church from which fire occasionally came. Lieut. George E. Maney, the Third Dragoons, Acting Adjutant, was sent back to order up the two companies of dragoons, with which Polk advanced beyond the plaza, to the top of a hill to the left, which dispersed the enemy. Polk ordered Lieutenant Adde to remain in occupation of the plaza, and Lieutenant Diwer's company, divided up into small squads, to pursue the enemy. Meanwhile, Walker had taken the church, killed some of the enemy, and captured others.

General Lane reported his loss to be one killed and six wounded. He estimated the Jaruata's loss at one hundred and fifty killed, (including Padre Martinez, Jarauta's second in command) and fifty captured including three American deserters. At the end of his report Lane wrote about a fire that broke out in the city during the fighting:

I regret to state, that during the engagement, in the incessant firing, fire was accidentally communicated to the thatched roof of one of the houses, and which finally spread over a large portion of the town.

== Aftermath ==
Lane left Zacualtipan the next day. Jarauta and his force despite having suffered a heavy blow, returned a few hours after Lane had left, visiting and seeing to the care of the wounded before following Lane's force south, looking for an opportunity to pick off stragglers or make an attack, but were given none. Lane's force arrived in Mexico City without further incident on March 1.

The Action of Sequalteplan was the last expedition of the American forces against the guerrillas in central Mexico before the Armistice of March 5 was signed. Hostilities by the forces of the belligerents were to cease with the signing of the Treaty of Guadalupe Hidalgo. However some of the guerrillas, including Jarauta, actively and stridently opposed the treaty and so continued their hostilities, making the roads dangerous. Eventually these groups were dispersed or crushed by the Mexican government, with Jarauta himself being captured and executed by the Mexican Army in July. The Americans evacuated Mexico in August following news of the approval of the Treaty by the Senate.

== See also ==
- Battles of the Mexican–American War
