= James T. Sandford =

American politician

James T. Sanford

Member of the U.S. House of Representatives from Tennessee's 6th district
- In office March 4, 1823 – March 3, 1825
- Preceded by: Henry H. Bryan
- Succeeded by: James K. Polk

Personal details
- Profession: planter, politician

James T. Sanford was an American politician who represented Tennessee in the United States House of Representatives from 1823 to 1825.

== Biography ==
Sanford was born in the U.S. state of Virginia. He attended the local common schools, and moved to Columbia, Tennessee, where he engaged in agricultural pursuits.

Elected as a Jacksonian Republican to the Eighteenth Congress, Sanford served from March 4, 1823 to March 3, 1825. He was an unsuccessful candidate for re-election to the Nineteenth Congress in 1825.

While his death date and place of interment is unknown, he contributed a part of his wealth to the establishment of Jackson College at Columbia, Tennessee.

U.S. House of Representatives
Preceded by Henry H. Bryan	Member of the U.S. House of Representatives from Tennessee's 6th congressional district 1823–1825	Succeeded by James K. Polk
