= Battle of Loma de las Ánimas =

1859 battle of the Mexican Reform War

- Part of the Reform War
Date	1 November 1859
Location	Loma de las Ánimas, Guanajuato
Result	Liberal victory

Belligerents
Liberals	Conservatives

Commanders and leaders
Manuel Doblado; Santos Degollado	José María Alfaro

The Battle of Loma de las Ánimas took place on 1 November 1859 in the vicinity of Loma de las Animas in the state of Guanajuato, Mexico, between elements of the liberal army of the First Light Battalion, under the command of general Manuel Doblado and Santos Degollado and elements of the conservative army commanded by General Jose Maria Alfaro during the War of Reform. The battle resulted in a Liberal victory.
