= Tennessee's 6th congressional district =

U.S. House district for Tennessee

Coordinates: 36°11′41″N 85°46′42″W

- Interactive map of district boundaries
- Representative: John Rose; R–Cookeville
- Distribution: 51.77% rural; 48.23% urban
- Population (2025): 824,765
- Median household income: $76,168
- Ethnicity: 77.7% White; 9.0% Black; 7.7% Hispanic; 3.9% Two or more races; 1.1% Asian; 0.6% other
- Cook PVI: R+13

The 6th congressional district of Tennessee is a congressional district in Middle Tennessee. It has been represented by Republican John Rose since January 2019.

Much of the sixth district is rural and wooded. It is spread across the geographic regions known as the Cumberland Plateau, the Highland Rim, and the Central Basin. The area is known for its waterfalls, such as Burgess Falls and Cummins Falls. Much of the western part of the district is located in the Nashville metropolitan area, along with a portion of Nashville itself.

As of the 2022 redistricting cycle, the largest cities in the district are Hendersonville, Gallatin, Cookeville, and the eastern portions of Lebanon and Nashville.

== Composition ==
The district is located in north-central Tennessee and borders Kentucky to the north. For the 118th and successive Congresses (based on redistricting following the 2020 census), it contains all or portions of the following counties and communities:

Cannon County (2)

Auburntown, Woodbury

Clay County (1)

Celina

Cumberland County (7)

All 7 communities

Davidson County (3)

Goodlettsville (shared with Sumner County), Nashville (part; also 5th and 7th), Ridgetop (part; also 7th; shared with Robertson County)

DeKalb County (4)

All 4 communities

Fentress County (4)

All 4 communities

Jackson County (2)

Dodson Branch, Gainesboro

Macon County (2)

Lafayette, Red Boiling Springs

Overton County (2)

Hilham, Livingston

Pickett County (1)

Byrdstown

Putnam County (4)

All 4 communities

Scott County (4)

Helenwood, Huntsville, Oneida, Winfield

Smith County (4)

All 4 communities

Sumner County (18)

All 18 communities

Trousdale County (1)

Hartsville

Warren County (0)

No incorporated or census-recognized communities

Wilson County (6)

Greenvale (part; also 5th), Lebanon (part; also 5th), Mount Juliet (part; also 5th), Statesville, Tuckers Crossroads, Watertown

White County (3)

All 3 communities

Van Buren County (1)

Spencer

== Recent election results from statewide races ==
Year	Office	Results
2008	President	McCain 58% - 40%
2012	President	Romney 62% - 38%
2016	President	Trump 64% - 32%
2018	Senate	Blackburn 55% - 44%
2018	Governor	Lee 59% - 39%
2020	President	Trump 64% - 34%
2020	Senate	Hagerty 65% - 33%
2022	Governor	Lee 66% - 32%
2024	President	Trump 67% - 32%
2024	Senate	Blackburn 66% - 32%

== History ==
Prior to the 1980 census, when Tennessee picked up a district, most of what is now the 6th district was in the 4th district. During the 1940s, this area was represented by Albert Gore, Sr. of Carthage. Gore was elected to the United States Senate in 1952, where he was instrumental in creating the Interstate Highway system.

From 1953 to 1977, the area was represented by Joe L. Evins of Smithville. Evins's nephew, Dan Evins, was the founder of Cracker Barrel Old Country Store restaurant/retail chain. Cracker Barrel's headquarters are still located in Lebanon.

In 1976, Evins was succeeded by Al Gore, then-future Vice President and son of Albert Gore, Sr. He was representing the area when much of it was moved into the present 6th district.

Shortly following the redistricting into the 6th district, Gore was elected to the United States Senate. He was then succeeded by former Tennessee Democratic Party chairman Bart Gordon of Murfreesboro. Gordon held the post for the next 26 years, generally with little difficulty. The only year he faced serious opposition was 1994, when attorney Steve Gill ran against him. Gordon defeated Gill by only one percentage point.

Politically speaking, the region was traditionally a "Yellow Dog Democrat" district. However, it began shifting rightward as Nashville's suburbs bled into the district and the rural counties trended Republican. It supported Bill Clinton in 1992, partly due to the presence of Al Gore, who represented it from 1977 to 1985, as Clinton's running mate. However, it has not supported a Democrat for president since. Longtime Democratic incumbent Bart Gordon consistently won re-election easily even as the district swung rightward after the turn of the millennium. By the mid-2000s, however, it was believed that the Democrats would have a hard time keeping the seat after Gordon retired.

Diane Black of Gallatin was elected in the Republican landslide of 2010 when Gordon retired after 26 years in Congress. Black's victory marked the first time that much of the district had been represented by a Republican since 1921, and for only the second time since Reconstruction. The 2010 redistricting made the district even more Republican, even as its longtime anchor of Murfreesboro was drawn into the neighboring 4th District. From 2012-2020, no Democrat had won any county within the district in any presidential, gubernatorial, senate, or congressional election. However, in 2022 the district was redrawn as part of the statewide redistricting process, which split Nashville–a Democratic stronghold—among two other Republican‑leaning districts. While this added a portion of eastern Nashville into the district, the overall partisanship remained strongly Republican.

== List of members representing the district ==
Member (Residence)	Party	Years	Cong ress	Electoral history	District location
District established March 4, 1813
Parry W. Humphreys (Nashville)	Democratic-Republican	March 4, 1813 – March 3, 1815	13th	Elected in 1813. Retired.	1813–1823 [data missing]
James B. Reynolds (Clarksville)	Democratic-Republican	March 4, 1815 – March 3, 1817	14th	Elected in 1815. Lost re-election.	1813–1823 [data missing]
George W. L. Marr (Clarksville)	Democratic-Republican	March 4, 1817 – March 3, 1819	15th	Elected in 1817. Lost renomination.	1813–1823 [data missing]
Henry H. Bryan (Palmyra)	Democratic-Republican	March 4, 1819 – March 3, 1821	16th	Elected in 1819. Re-elected in 1821 but failed to qualify.	1813–1823 [data missing]
Vacant		March 4, 1821 – March 3, 1823	17th		1813–1823 [data missing]
James T. Sandford (Columbia)	Democratic-Republican	March 4, 1823 – March 3, 1825	18th	Elected in 1823. Lost re-election.	1823–1833 [data missing]
James K. Polk (Columbia)	Jacksonian	March 4, 1825 – March 3, 1833	19th 20th 21st 22nd	Elected in 1825. Re-elected in 1827. Re-elected in 1829. Re-elected in 1831. Redistricted to the 9th district.	1823–1833 [data missing]
Balie Peyton (Gallatin)	Jacksonian	March 4, 1833 – March 3, 1835	23rd 24th	Elected in 1833. Re-elected in 1835. Retired.	1833–1843 [data missing]
Balie Peyton (Gallatin)	Anti-Jacksonian	March 4, 1835 – March 3, 1837	23rd 24th	Elected in 1833. Re-elected in 1835. Retired.	1833–1843 [data missing]
William B. Campbell (Carthage)	Whig	March 4, 1837 – March 3, 1843	25th 26th 27th	Elected in 1837. Re-elected in 1839. Re-elected in 1841. Retired.	1833–1843 [data missing]
Aaron V. Brown (Pulaski)	Democratic	March 4, 1843 – March 3, 1845	28th	Redistricted from the 10th district and re-elected in 1843. Retired to run for Governor of Tennessee.	1843–1853 [data missing]
Barclay Martin (Columbia)	Democratic	March 4, 1845 – March 3, 1847	29th	Elected in 1845. Retired.	1843–1853 [data missing]
James H. Thomas (Columbia)	Democratic	March 4, 1847 – March 3, 1851	30th 31st	Elected in 1847. Re-elected in 1849. Lost re-election.	1843–1853 [data missing]
William H. Polk (Columbia)	Independent Democratic	March 4, 1851 – March 3, 1853	32nd	Elected in 1851. Retired.	1843–1853 [data missing]
George W. Jones (Fayetteville)	Democratic	March 4, 1853 – March 3, 1859	33rd 34th 35th	Redistricted from the 5th district and re-elected in 1853. Re-elected in 1855. Re-elected in 1857. Retired.	1853–1861 [data missing]
James H. Thomas (Columbia)	Democratic	March 4, 1859 – March 3, 1861	36th	Elected in 1859. Retired.	1853–1861 [data missing]
District inactive		March 4, 1861 – July 24, 1866	37th 38th 39th	Civil War and Reconstruction	
Samuel M. Arnell (Columbia)	Union	July 24, 1866 – March 3, 1867	39th 40th 41st	Elected in 1865. Re-elected in 1867. Re-elected in 1868. Retired.	1866–1873 [data missing]
Samuel M. Arnell (Columbia)	Republican	March 4, 1867 – March 3, 1871	39th 40th 41st	Elected in 1865. Re-elected in 1867. Re-elected in 1868. Retired.	1866–1873 [data missing]
Washington C. Whitthorne (Columbia)	Democratic	March 4, 1871 – March 3, 1875	42nd 43rd	Elected in 1870. Re-elected in 1872. Redistricted to the 7th district.	1866–1873 [data missing]
Washington C. Whitthorne (Columbia)	Democratic	March 4, 1871 – March 3, 1875	42nd 43rd	Elected in 1870. Re-elected in 1872. Redistricted to the 7th district.	1873–1883 [data missing]
John F. House (Clarksville)	Democratic	March 4, 1875 – March 3, 1883	44th 45th 46th 47th	Elected in 1874. Re-elected in 1876. Re-elected in 1878. Re-elected in 1880. Retired.	1873–1883 [data missing]
Andrew J. Caldwell (Nashville)	Democratic	March 4, 1883 – March 3, 1887	48th 49th	Elected in 1882. Re-elected in 1884. Retired.	1883–1893 [data missing]
Joseph E. Washington (Cedar Hill)	Democratic	March 4, 1887 – March 3, 1897	50th 51st 52nd 53rd 54th	Elected in 1886. Re-elected in 1888. Re-elected in 1890. Re-elected in 1892. Re-elected in 1894. Retired.	1883–1893 [data missing]
Joseph E. Washington (Cedar Hill)	Democratic	March 4, 1887 – March 3, 1897	50th 51st 52nd 53rd 54th	Elected in 1886. Re-elected in 1888. Re-elected in 1890. Re-elected in 1892. Re-elected in 1894. Retired.	1893–1903 [data missing]
John W. Gaines (Nashville)	Democratic	March 4, 1897 – March 3, 1909	55th 56th 57th 58th 59th 60th	Elected in 1896. Re-elected in 1898. Re-elected in 1900. Re-elected in 1902. Re-elected in 1904. Re-elected in 1906. Lost renomination.	1893–1903 [data missing]
John W. Gaines (Nashville)	Democratic	March 4, 1897 – March 3, 1909	55th 56th 57th 58th 59th 60th	Elected in 1896. Re-elected in 1898. Re-elected in 1900. Re-elected in 1902. Re-elected in 1904. Re-elected in 1906. Lost renomination.	1903–1913 [data missing]
Jo Byrns (Nashville)	Democratic	March 4, 1909 – March 3, 1933	61st 62nd 63rd 64th 65th 66th 67th 68th 69th 70th 71st 72nd	Elected in 1908. Re-elected in 1910. Re-elected in 1912. Re-elected in 1914. Re-elected in 1916. Re-elected in 1918. Re-elected in 1920. Re-elected in 1922. Re-elected in 1924. Re-elected in 1926. Re-elected in 1928. Re-elected in 1930. Redistricted to the 5th district.	1903–1913 [data missing]
Jo Byrns (Nashville)	Democratic	March 4, 1909 – March 3, 1933	61st 62nd 63rd 64th 65th 66th 67th 68th 69th 70th 71st 72nd	Elected in 1908. Re-elected in 1910. Re-elected in 1912. Re-elected in 1914. Re-elected in 1916. Re-elected in 1918. Re-elected in 1920. Re-elected in 1922. Re-elected in 1924. Re-elected in 1926. Re-elected in 1928. Re-elected in 1930. Redistricted to the 5th district.	1913–1923 [data missing]
Jo Byrns (Nashville)	Democratic	March 4, 1909 – March 3, 1933	61st 62nd 63rd 64th 65th 66th 67th 68th 69th 70th 71st 72nd	Elected in 1908. Re-elected in 1910. Re-elected in 1912. Re-elected in 1914. Re-elected in 1916. Re-elected in 1918. Re-elected in 1920. Re-elected in 1922. Re-elected in 1924. Re-elected in 1926. Re-elected in 1928. Re-elected in 1930. Redistricted to the 5th district.	1923–1933 [data missing]
Clarence W. Turner (Waverly)	Democratic	March 4, 1933 – March 23, 1939	73rd 74th 75th 76th	Elected in 1932. Re-elected in 1934. Re-elected in 1936. Re-elected in 1938. Died.	1933–1943 [data missing]
Vacant		March 23, 1939 – May 11, 1939	76th		1933–1943 [data missing]
W. Wirt Courtney (Franklin)	Democratic	May 11, 1939 – January 3, 1943	76th 77th	Elected to finish Turner's term. Re-elected in 1940. Redistricted to the 7th district.	1933–1943 [data missing]
Percy Priest (Nashville)	Democratic	January 3, 1943 – January 3, 1953	78th 79th 80th 81st 82nd	Elected in 1942. Re-elected in 1944. Re-elected in 1946. Re-elected in 1948. Re-elected in 1950. Redistricted to the 5th district.	1943–1953 [data missing]
James P. Sutton (Lawrenceburg)	Democratic	January 3, 1953 – January 3, 1955	83rd	Redistricted from the 7th district and re-elected in 1952. Retired to run for U.S. senator.	1953–1963 [data missing]
Ross Bass (Pulaski)	Democratic	January 3, 1955 – November 3, 1964	84th 85th 86th 87th 88th	Elected in 1954. Re-elected in 1956. Re-elected in 1958. Re-elected in 1960. Re-elected in 1962. Retired to run for U.S. senator and resigned when elected.	1953–1963 [data missing]
Ross Bass (Pulaski)	Democratic	January 3, 1955 – November 3, 1964	84th 85th 86th 87th 88th	Elected in 1954. Re-elected in 1956. Re-elected in 1958. Re-elected in 1960. Re-elected in 1962. Retired to run for U.S. senator and resigned when elected.	1963–1973 [data missing]
Vacant		November 3, 1964 – January 3, 1965	88th		1963–1973 [data missing]
William R. Anderson (Waverly)	Democratic	January 3, 1965 – January 3, 1973	89th 90th 91st 92nd	Elected in 1964. Re-elected in 1966. Re-elected in 1968. Re-elected in 1970. Lost re-election.	1963–1973 [data missing]
Robin Beard (Franklin)	Republican	January 3, 1973 – January 3, 1983	93rd 94th 95th 96th 97th	Elected in 1972. Re-elected in 1974. Re-elected in 1976. Re-elected in 1978. Re-elected in 1980. Retired to run for U.S. senator.	1973–1983 [data missing]
Al Gore (Carthage)	Democratic	January 3, 1983 – January 3, 1985	98th	Redistricted from the 4th district and re-elected in 1982. Retired to run for U.S. senator.	1983–1993 [data missing]
Bart Gordon (Murfreesboro)	Democratic	January 3, 1985 – January 3, 2011	99th 100th 101st 102nd 103rd 104th 105th 106th 107th 108th 109th 110th 111th	Elected in 1984. Re-elected in 1986. Re-elected in 1988. Re-elected in 1990. Re-elected in 1992. Re-elected in 1994. Re-elected in 1996. Re-elected in 1998. Re-elected in 2000. Re-elected in 2002. Re-elected in 2004. Re-elected in 2006. Re-elected in 2008. Retired.	1983–1993 [data missing]
Bart Gordon (Murfreesboro)	Democratic	January 3, 1985 – January 3, 2011	99th 100th 101st 102nd 103rd 104th 105th 106th 107th 108th 109th 110th 111th	Elected in 1984. Re-elected in 1986. Re-elected in 1988. Re-elected in 1990. Re-elected in 1992. Re-elected in 1994. Re-elected in 1996. Re-elected in 1998. Re-elected in 2000. Re-elected in 2002. Re-elected in 2004. Re-elected in 2006. Re-elected in 2008. Retired.	1993–2003 [data missing]
Bart Gordon (Murfreesboro)	Democratic	January 3, 1985 – January 3, 2011	99th 100th 101st 102nd 103rd 104th 105th 106th 107th 108th 109th 110th 111th	Elected in 1984. Re-elected in 1986. Re-elected in 1988. Re-elected in 1990. Re-elected in 1992. Re-elected in 1994. Re-elected in 1996. Re-elected in 1998. Re-elected in 2000. Re-elected in 2002. Re-elected in 2004. Re-elected in 2006. Re-elected in 2008. Retired.	2003–2013
Diane Black (Gallatin)	Republican	January 3, 2011 – January 3, 2019	112th 113th 114th 115th	Elected in 2010. Re-elected in 2012. Re-elected in 2014. Re-elected in 2016. Retired to run for governor of Tennessee.	2003–2013
Diane Black (Gallatin)	Republican	January 3, 2011 – January 3, 2019	112th 113th 114th 115th	Elected in 2010. Re-elected in 2012. Re-elected in 2014. Re-elected in 2016. Retired to run for governor of Tennessee.	2013–2023
John Rose (Cookeville)	Republican	January 3, 2019 – present	116th 117th 118th 119th	Elected in 2018. Re-elected in 2020. Re-elected in 2022. Re-elected in 2024. Retired to run for governor of Tennessee.	2013–2023
John Rose (Cookeville)	Republican	January 3, 2019 – present	116th 117th 118th 119th	Elected in 2018. Re-elected in 2020. Re-elected in 2022. Re-elected in 2024. Retired to run for governor of Tennessee.	2023–2027
Johnny Garrett	Republican	Assuming office on January 3, 2027		Elected in 2026.	2023–2027

== See also ==
- Tennessee's congressional districts
- List of United States congressional districts
