= Herman Thorn =

US army officer (1823 - 1849)

Herman Thorn (1823–1849) was a U.S. Army officer who rose from the enlisted ranks and died serving on the frontier in 1849. A well on a frontier trail in Texas and an army fort in New Mexico was named for him.

Herman Thorn was born in New York, on March 22, 1823, to Herman Thorne and Jane Mary Jauncey Thorne.

He enlisted in the Second Infantry Regiment with the rank of second Lieutenant on October 5, 1846. He was transferred to the newly raised 3rd U.S. Dragoons on April 9, 1847. He fought in the Mexican–American War and was cited for gallantry during the battles of Churubusco and Molino del Rey. In the later action Thorn and several other officers that volunteered to move and serve as crew of an artillery piece under the command of Captain Simon H. Drum that had a decisive effect on the battle. He was promoted to captain on September 8, 1847, for that action.

After the war Thorn was reduced in rank back to 2nd Lieutenant, and returned to the 2nd Infantry and sent to serve in Texas and the newly acquired New Mexico Territory. He was assigned to escort wagon trains to El Paso. He escorted the Indian Agent James Calhoun in his journeys. When escorting the train of Col. Colliers and crossing New Mexico Territory to the Colorado River a wagon overturned while crossing the river at the Yuma Crossing near what is now Yuma, Arizona. Thorn drowned attempting to rescue two New Mexican civilian teamsters drowning in the Colorado River on October 16, 1849.

== Legacy ==
Thorn's Well at Cornudas Station near Dell City, Texas, was named for Lt. Herman Thorn who found it while he was stopped there with a party of 49'ers in the summer of 1849 heading west to California at the beginning of the California Gold Rush. Fort Thorn was named for him by General John Garland who commanded the military department of the New Mexico Territory in 1853.
