= Manuel Doblado =

Mexican politician, lawyer, diplomat and military officer (1818-1865)

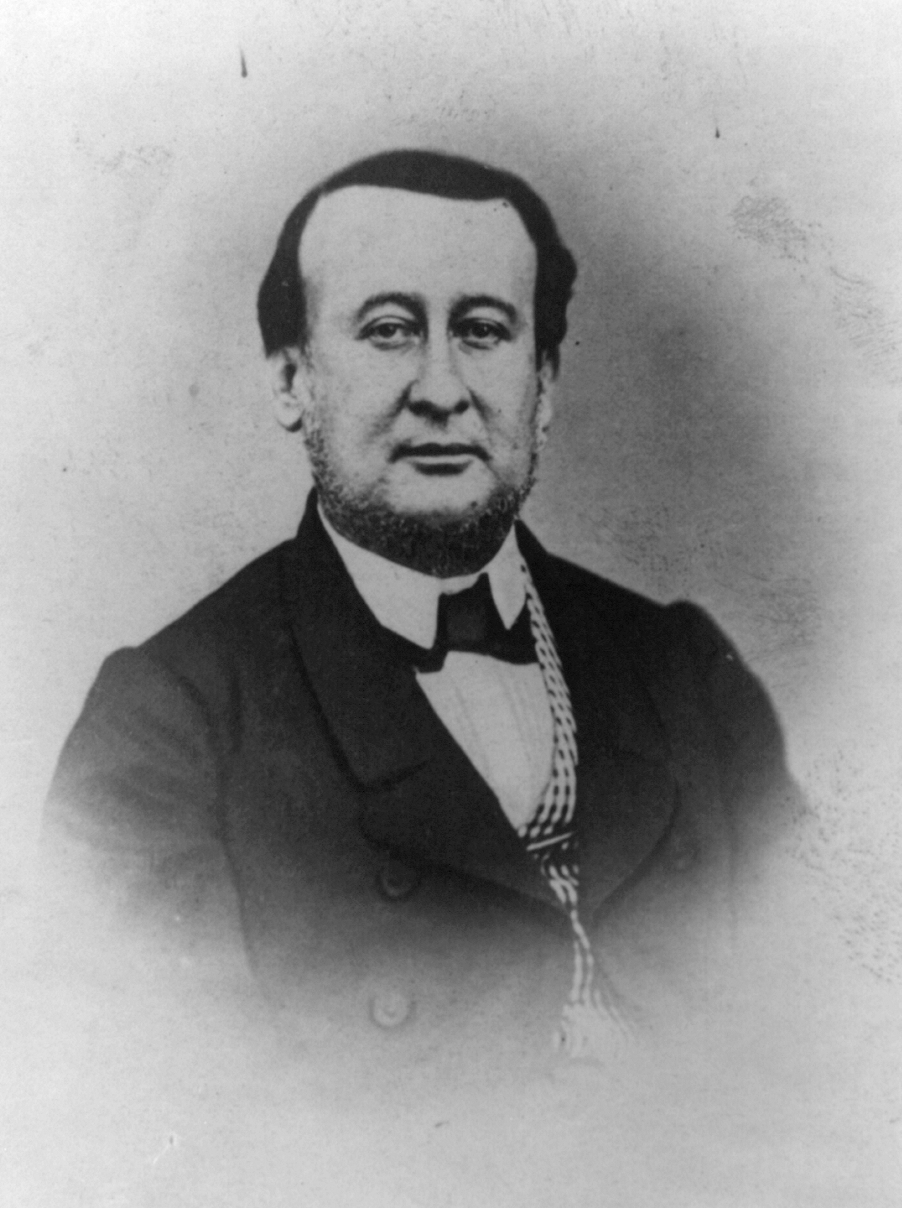

Minister of Foreign Affairs
- In office 2 September 1863 – 11 September 1863
- President: Benito Juárez
- Preceded by: Juan Antonio de la Fuente
- Succeeded by: Sebastián Lerdo de Tejada
- In office 30 April 1862 – 11 August 1862
- Preceded by: Jesús Terán Peredo
- Succeeded by: Juan de Dios Arias
- In office 11 December 1861 – 15 April 1862
- Preceded by: Juan de Dios Arias
- Succeeded by: Jesús Terán Peredo

Governor of Guanajuato
- In office 15 February 1863 – 6 December 1863
- Preceded by: Francisco de Paula Rodríguez
- Succeeded by: Committee of neutral representatives (Frech occupation)
- In office 18 June 1860 – 21 January 1862
- Preceded by: Francisco Berdusco
- Succeeded by: Francisco de Paula Rodríguez
- In office 21 August 1855 – 16 January 1858
- Preceded by: Esteban Barbero
- Succeeded by: Francisco de Paula Rodríguez
- In office 20 August 1846 – 31 January 1847
- Preceded by: Mariano Chico
- Succeeded by: Lorenzo Arellano

Governor and Military Commander of Jalisco
- In office October 1862 – 5 December 1862
- Preceded by: Pedro Ogazón
- Succeeded by: Jesús López Portillo
Other cabinet positions
Minister of Interior
In office 22 August 1863 – 11 September 1863
| President | Benito Juárez |
| Preceded by | Juan Antonio de la Fuente |
| Succeeded by | Sebastián Lerdo de Tejada |
In office 13 April 1862 – 13 August 1862
| Preceded by | Jesús Terán Peredo |
| Succeeded by | Juan Antonio de la Fuente |
In office 11 December 1861 – 6 April 1862
| Preceded by | Juan José de la Garza |
| Succeeded by | Jesús Terán Peredo |
Minister of Finance
In office 19 March 1862 – 24 August 1862
| President | Benito Juárez |
| Preceded by | José González Echeverría |
| Succeeded by | José Higinio Núñez |
Minister of Development
In office 11 December 1861 – 16 December 1861
| President | Benito Juárez |
| Preceded by | Blas Balcárcel |
| Succeeded by | Blas Balcárcel |

Personal details
- Born: 12 June 1818 San Pedro Piedra Gorda, New Kingdom of Galicia, Viceroyalty of New Spain (now Manuel Doblado, Guanajuato, Mexico)
- Died: 19 June 1865 (aged 47) New York City, New York, United States
- Party: Liberal
- Education: University of Guanajuato
- Occupation: Lawyer; politician; diplomat; military officer

Military service
- Allegiance: Mexico
- Branch/service: Mexican Army
- Rank: General
- Battles/wars: Plan de Los Lagos Revolt; Revolution of Ayutla; Reform War; Battle of Celaya; Battle of Loma de las Ánimas; Battle of Estancia de las Vacas; Battle of Silao; Second Franco-Mexican War; Battle of Guanajuato

Manuel Doblado Partida (12 June 1818 – 19 June 1865) was a Mexican lawyer, politician, diplomat, and general from Guanajuato. He played an active role in the mid-19th-century liberal movements, serving multiple times as governor of his home state and holding key cabinet posts under President Benito Juárez.

He is best known for negotiating the Preliminaries of La Soledad in 1862, which helped convince Britain and Spain to withdraw from the tripartite intervention and isolated France during the lead-up to the Second Franco-Mexican War.

== Early life and entry into politics ==
He was born Manuel Vicente Ramón Doblado Partida on 12 June 1818 in San Pedro Piedra Gorda, Guanajuato, into a prosperous family. He studied at the local school and received a scholarship in 1831 to attend the University of Guanajuato, where he earned his law degree and developed his liberal ideals.

In 1846, Doblado was elected governor of Guanajuato at age 28. The state constitution however, required a minimum age of 30, so he could not initially assume office. He petitioned the state congress for an age dispensation. Congress approved the exception after the constitution was effectively modified for him. Guanajuato historian Diego Saúl Torres Solano noted that Doblado maintained connections with both local and national politicians. One key figure being then President Valentín Gómez Farías. He argues that such political backings were key in facilitating the dispensation.

In 1848, as a deputy to the Congress meeting in Querétaro, Doblado strongly opposed the Treaty of Guadalupe Hidalgo viewing it as an unjust dismemberment of Mexican territory. He briefly joined the Plan de los Lagos Revolt, proclaimed on 1 June 1848 by priest Celedonio Dómeco de Jarauta alongside former president Mariano Paredes. The rebels occupied Guanajuato but were defeated by government forces under Anastasio Bustamante. Jarauta was captured and executed on 19 July 1848. Doblado escaped and avoided serious long-term punishment, returning to legal practice.

== Revolution of Ayutla and Reform War ==
Doblado joined the liberal Revolution of Ayutla against Antonio López de Santa Anna’s increasingly authoritarian government. On 13 August 1855 he proclaimed the Plan de Piedra Gorda in Guanajuato, denouncing the excesses of Santa Anna’s regime and calling for liberal unity. After the liberal victory, he once again assumed the governorship of Guanajuato and implemented liberal administrative and legislative reforms, such as replacing auxiliary troops with the National Guard.

When conservatives opposition to the promulgation of the liberal Constitution of 1857 caused a new civil war, he declared Guanajuato the provisional capital of the Republic to protect Benito Juárez liberal government in January 1858. He led military efforts throughout the war maintaining Guanajuato a key liberal stronghold.

== French intervention in Mexico ==
After the liberal victory in the Reform War, Juárez’s government faced severe financial difficulties and suspended foreign debt payments in 1861. Britain, France, and Spain formed a tripartite alliance under the Convention of London and landed troops at Veracruz to enforce repayment.

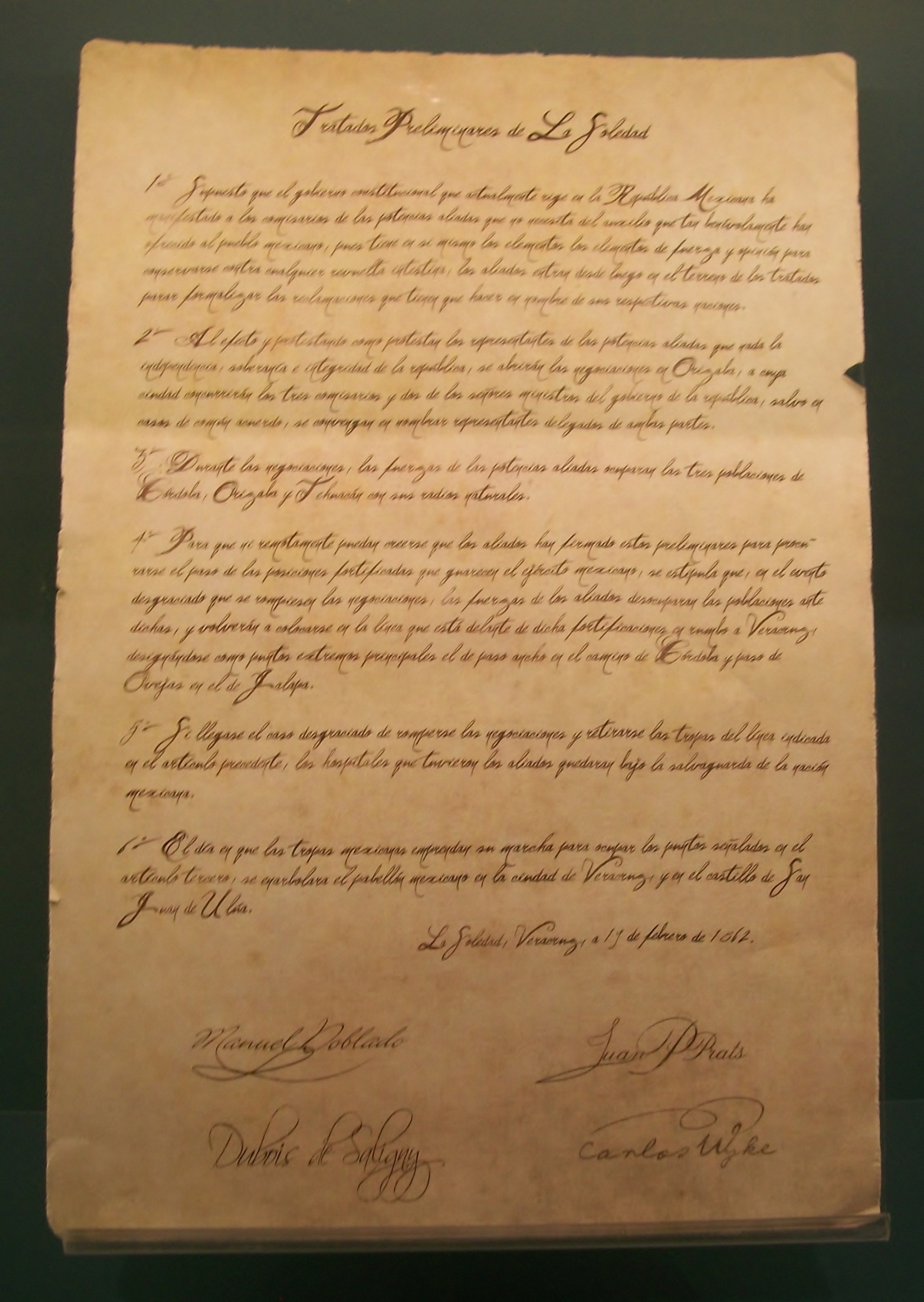
Preliminary Treaties of La Soledad, signed on February 18, 1862. Museo Nacional de las Intervenciones, Mexico City, Mexico.

As Minister of Foreign Relations, Doblado led Mexico’s negotiations with the allied commissioners. On 19 February 1862, he signed the Preliminaries of La Soledad near Veracruz with Spanish General Juan Prim. The agreement recognized Juárez’s constitutional government, limited allied troop movements inland, and opened the door for further talks in Orizaba. Britain and Spain quickly withdrew upon realizing Napoleon III’s true goal of overthrowing the Mexican Republic and stablishing a monarchy. Doblado’s diplomatic success at La Soledad isolated France and bought Mexico crucial time. He later warned the French that their actions would lead to full-scale war.

Doblado continued serving in both diplomatic and military capacities. He organized liberal forces in the Bajío, participating in campaigns against French and imperialist troops. He fled to Jalisco following the fall of Guanajuato where he briefly held governorship and military command. In August 1864, he escorted Juárez when the latter had to relocate his government to the north of the country, traveling via Saltillo and Monterrey to Paso del Norte. In declining health, he traveled to the United States seeking medical treatment, but died in New York City on 19 June 1865 at age 47. His remains were repatriated to Mexico on 13 September 1869 and received with a grand funeral ceremony and later interred in the Panteón Municipal Santa Paula.

== Legacy ==
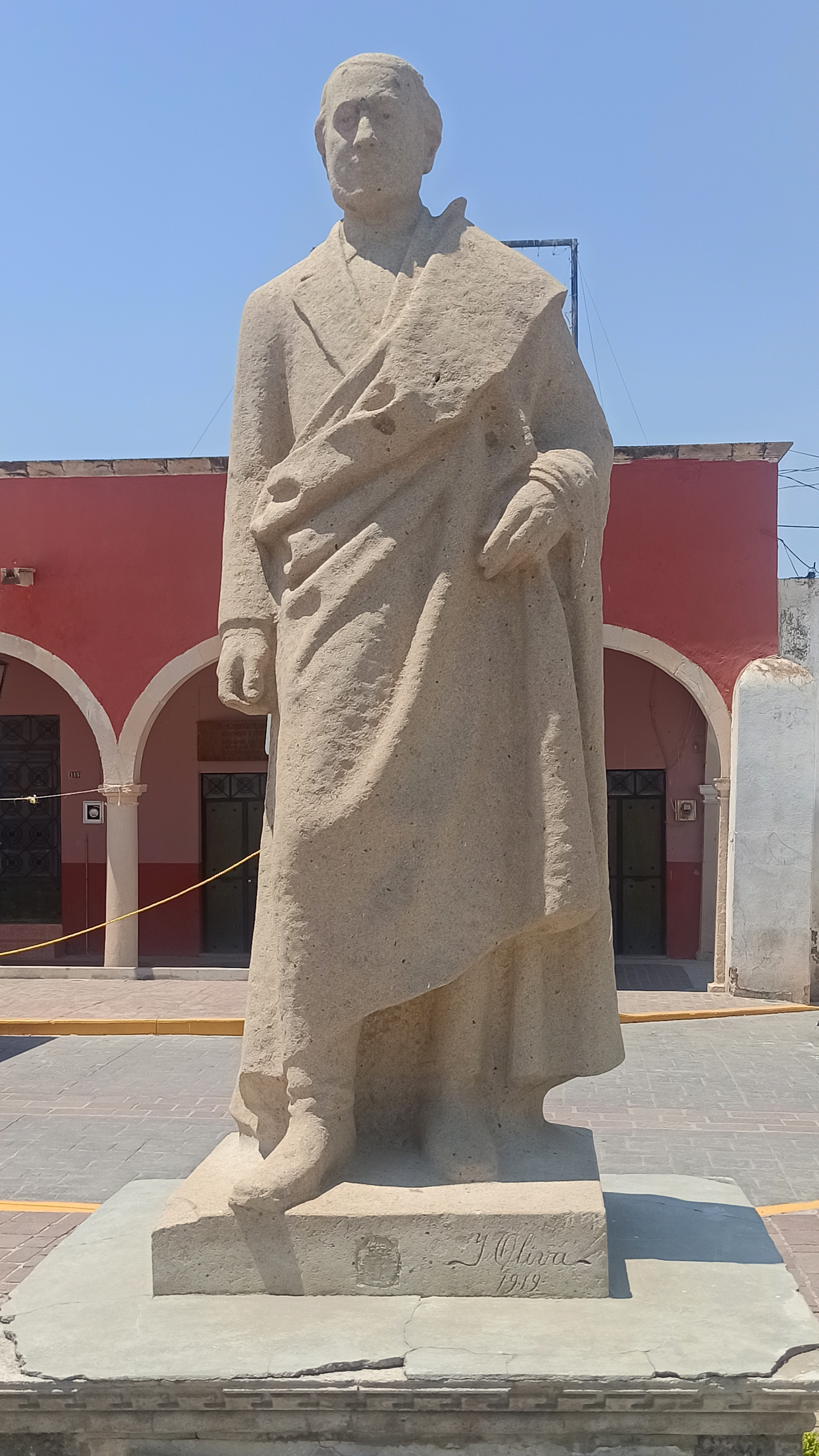
Statue of Doblado in the Plaza de la Victoria in Ciudad Manuel Doblado

His personal papers and correspondence have served as primary source material for studies of the Reform era. Notable among these is the published collection La guerra de Reforma según el archivo del General D. Manuel Doblado (1857–1860).

Doblado’s birthplace, the town of San Pedro Piedra Gorda in the state of Guanajuato, was officially renamed Ciudad Manuel Doblado on 16 November 1899 by Decree number 46 of the State Legislature in recognition of his contributions. The renaming elevated the former congregation to city status during the governorship of Joaquín Obregón González.

A statue of Doblado, donated in 1919 by the poet, teacher, and musicologist Rubén M. Campos during centennial celebrations of his birth, stands in the Plaza de la Victoria in his hometown. Streets, plazas, and public spaces in Guanajuato and other parts of Mexico continue to bear his name.

== See also ==
- Manuel Doblado, Guanajuato
- Soledad de Doblado, Veracruz
