= George Washington Lent Marr =

American politician

Member of the U.S. House of Representatives from Tennessee's 6th district
- In office March 4, 1817 – March 3, 1819
- Preceded by: James B. Reynolds
- Succeeded by: Henry H. Bryan

Personal details
- Born: May 25, 1779 Henry County, Virginia
- Died: September 5, 1856 (aged 77)
- Party: Democratic-Republican; Whig
- Education: University of North Carolina
- Profession: planter lawyer politician

George Washington Lent Marr (May 25, 1779 – September 5, 1856) was an American politician who represented Tennessee in the United States House of Representatives.

== Biography ==
Marr was born near Marrs Hill, Henry County, Virginia on May 25, 1779. He attended rural schools and the University of North Carolina at Chapel Hill.

== Career ==
An attorney general for west Tennessee between 1807 and 1809, Marr was also an attorney general for the fifth district between 1809 and 1813. He served under Andrew Jackson during the War of 1812 and the campaign of 1813 to 1814 Creek War, during which he was wounded.

Marr was elected as a Democratic-Republican to the Fifteenth Congress, which lasted from March 4, 1817, to March 3, 1819. He was an unsuccessful candidate for renomination in 1818.

One of the largest landowners in west Tennessee, Marr moved from Clarksville to Obion County in 1821. He was a member of the Tennessee State Constitutional convention in 1834. He was associated with the Whig Party after its formation.

== Death and legacy ==
Marr died at his residence on Island No. 10, which has since been washed away, on September 5, 1856, age 77 years, 103 days. His residence was located in the Mississippi River, near New Madrid, Missouri. He is interred at Troy Cemetery in Troy, Tennessee.

'The Old Fort,' constructed around 1814 near Old Fort, Tennessee, housed troops assigned to protect white travelers and the Cherokees from Creek retaliation. The name Fort Marr was established when the fort was renovated into a stockade to use during the removal of the Cherokee people to the west. Believed to be named Marr, the fort was moved to its present location at Benton in 1965. In 1980, Fort Marr became the property of the Conservation Department of the state of Tennessee to be maintained and used as a historic site.

U.S. House of Representatives
Preceded by James B. Reynolds	Member of the U.S. House of Representatives from Tennessee's 6th congressional district 1817–1819	Succeeded by Henry H. Bryan
