= George Washington Jones (Tennessee politician) =

American politician (1806–1884)

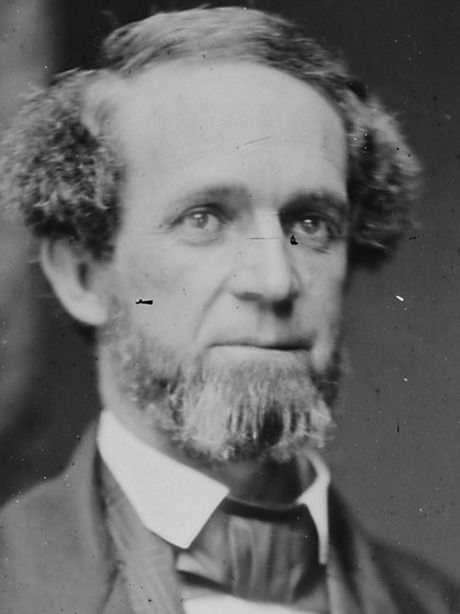

Chairman of the House Democratic Caucus
- In office March 4, 1855 – March 3, 1857
- Speaker: Nathaniel P. Banks (1856–1857)
- Preceded by: Edson B. Olds
- Succeeded by: George S. Houston (1859)

Member of the U.S. House of Representatives from Tennessee
- In office March 4, 1843 – March 3, 1859
- Preceded by: Hopkins L. Turney (5th); William H. Polk (6th)
- Succeeded by: Charles Ready (5th); James H. Thomas (6th)
- Constituency: 5th district (1843-53); 6th district (1853-59)

Member of the Tennessee Senate
- In office 1839–1841

Member of the Tennessee House of Representatives
- In office 1835–1839

Personal details
- Born: March 15, 1806 King and Queen County, Virginia
- Died: November 14, 1884 (aged 78) Fayetteville, Tennessee
- Party: Democratic

George Washington Jones (March 15, 1806 – November 14, 1884) was an American politician who represented Tennessee's fifth district in the United States House of Representatives. He served in the Confederate States Congress during the American Civil War.

== Biography ==
Jones was born in King and Queen County, Virginia, on March 15, 1806. He moved to Tennessee with his parents, who settled in Fayetteville. He received a common school and academical education, also apprenticed to the saddler's trade.

== Career ==
Jones was a justice of the peace from 1832 to 1835. He was a member of the Tennessee House of Representatives from 1835 to 1839. He served in the Tennessee Senate from 1839 to 1841. He was Clerk of Lincoln County Court from 1840 to 1843.

Elected as a Democrat to the Twenty-eighth and to the seven succeeding Congresses, Jones served in the U.S. House of Representatives from March 4, 1843, to March 3, 1853, for the fifth district and from March 4, 1853, to March 4, 1859, for the sixth district. During the Thirty-first Congress and the Thirty-second Congresses he was chairman of the U.S. House Committee on Rules, and during the Thirty-fifth Congress he was chairman of the U.S. House Committee on Roads and Canals. Jones represented the U.S. Congress at the swearing in of the terminally ill, newly elected Vice-President Willam Rufus deVane King in Matanzas, Cuba.

With war impending, Jones was a delegate to the Peace Convention of 1861 held in Washington, D.C., in an effort to devise means to prevent the conflict, but he did not attend. He was elected from Tennessee as a member of the Confederate House of Representatives in the First Confederate Congress and served from February 18, 1862, to February 18, 1864. He was not a candidate for re-election. Friend and former political ally President Andrew Johnson pardoned Jones for his Civil War activities in June 1865.

Jones was a delegate to the State constitutional convention in 1870. Jones strongly opposed the Poll Tax provision of the 1870 Tennessee Constitution.

== Death ==
Jones died in Fayetteville, Tennessee, on November 14, 1884 (age 78 years, 244 days). He is interred at Rose Hill Cemetery.

U.S. House of Representatives
Preceded by Hopkins L. Turney	Member of the U.S. House of Representatives from Tennessee's 5th congressional district March 4, 1843 – March 3, 1853	Succeeded by Charles Ready
Preceded by William H. Polk	Member of the U.S. House of Representatives from Tennessee's 6th congressional district March 4, 1853 – March 3, 1859	Succeeded by James H. Thomas
