= Edward G. W. Butler =

American landowner (1800–1888)

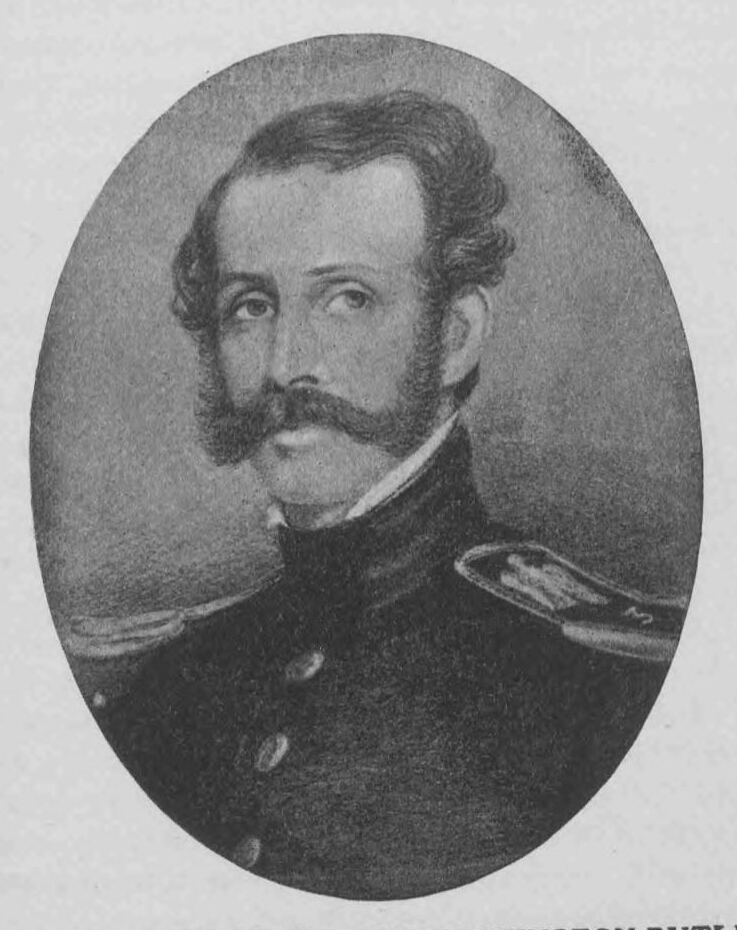
- Col. Edward George Washington Butler
- Born: February 22, 1800
- Died: September 5, 1888 (aged 88)
- Education: United States Military Academy
- Spouse: Frances Parke Lewis
- Military career
- Allegiance: United States
- Branch: United States Army; Louisiana Militia
- Service years: 1820-1831; 1847-1848 (Army); 1846-1847 (Militia)
- Rank: Colonel (Army); Brigadier General (Militia)
- Conflicts: Mexican-American War

Edward George Washington Butler (February 22, 1800 – September 5, 1888) was an American soldier and planter. He became a ward of Andrew Jackson after his father's death when he was still an infant. A graduate of West Point, he became an Army officer and served in the Mexican-American war.

== Life ==
He was one of the four children of American Revolutionary War soldier Edward Butler. When his father died in 1803, future president Andrew Jackson and his wife Rachel Donelson Jackson became Butler's guardians. Jackson believed West Point was the best educational opportunity in the country and secured an appointment for Butler at the U.S. Military Academy at West Point. Butler and Andrew Jackson Donelson, another of Andrew Jackson's wards, graduated ninth and second-ranked in the West Point class of 1820. Upon receiving his commission, he first served as a military land surveyor and then in an artillery unit.

In 1825 he assisted Edmund Pendleton Gaines in negotiations with the Muscogee people. The same year Butler refused to shake Henry Clay's hand when they were introduced, as Clay was a political opponent of Jackson, his guardian. This rejection caused a slow-burn political scandal and Gaines and Butler would likely both eventually have been discharged from the regular army as a result had Jackson not won the 1828 presidential election.

In 1831 Butler resigned from the army and became a sugar planter. He settled in Louisiana and owned Dunboyne Plantation in Iberville Parish. Butler's wife, Frances Parke Lewis, was a daughter of Lawrence Lewis and Eleanor Parke Custis, her mother being a granddaughter of Martha Custis Washington. Edward and Frances relocated scores of Mount Vernon slaves to their sugar plantation in the lower Mississippi River valley.

When the Mexican–American War began in 1846 Butler was a Major General in the Louisiana Militia. In the next year he temporarily returned to the army as Colonel of the 3rd U. S. Regiment of Dragoons, a wartime unit raised for one year or service; the latter ending in July 1848. He was a member of the Granite Democratic Club of Iberville Parish.

His son Edward G. W. Butler Jr. was appointed Secretary of the American Legation in Berlin in 1856.

== See also ==
- Joseph Erwin – American businessman (1762–1829)
- Fighting Butlers

== Sources ==
- Linn, John Blair (1883). "The Butler Family of the Pennsylvania Line". The Pennsylvania Magazine of History and Biography. 7 (1): 1–6. ISSN 0031-4587. JSTOR 20084587.
- Plater, David D. (2015). The Butlers of Iberville Parish, Louisiana: Dunboyne Plantation in the 1800s. Baton Rouge: Louisiana State University Press. ISBN 978-0-8071-6128-9. Project MUSE book 48467.
