= Henry Hunter Bryan =

American politician

Member of the U.S. House of Representatives from Tennessee's 6th district
- In office March 4, 1819 – March 3, 1821
- Preceded by: George W. L. Marr
- Succeeded by: James T. Sandford

Personal details
- Born: February 23, 1786 Martin County, North Carolina
- Died: May 7, 1835 (aged 49) Montgomery County, Tennessee
- Party: Democratic-Republican
- Spouse: Elizabeth Ann Averett Bryan
- Children: Henry Hunter Bryan Jr.; Harriet Bryan; R. A. Virginia Bryan; Marina Turner Bryan
- Profession: politician

Henry Hunter Bryan (February 23, 1786 – May 7, 1835) was an American politician who represented Tennessee in the United States House of Representatives.

== Biography ==
Bryan was born in Martin County, North Carolina and attended grammar and high school there. After he moved to Tennessee, he held several local offices. He married Elizabeth Ann Averett, daughter of Jesse Averett and Mary Grimes, in 1804.

== Career ==
Bryan was elected as a Democratic-Republican to the Sixteenth Congress, which lasted from March 4, 1819 to March 3, 1821. Although he had been re-elected to the Seventeenth Congress, he did not take the seat because he did not qualify.

== Death ==
Bryan was a member of the Freemasons. He died in Montgomery County, Tennessee, on May 7, 1835 (age 49 years, 73 days). The location of his interment is unknown. His brother, Joseph Hunter Bryan, was also a U.S. Representative from the state of North Carolina.

U.S. House of Representatives
Preceded by George W. L. Marr	Member of the U.S. House of Representatives from Tennessee's 6th congressional district 1819-1821	Succeeded by James T. Sandford
