= Armand Alexandre de Castagny =

French general

Armand Alexandre Castagny (Vannes 30 November 1807 – 13 November 1900 Belle Île) was a French general.

== Military life ==
=== Early military career ===
As a lieutenant, Armand Alexander de Castagny was at the French siege of Antwerp in 1832. He later served in Algiers.

He fought in all of the Wars of the Second Empire. A lieutenant colonel at the start of the Crimean War, he became a colonel of light infantry and participated in the Battle of Chernaya. He was awarded numerous distinctions and decorations after this conflict.

As a Brigade General in the 1859 Italian campaign, he commanded the second regiment of Zouaves and the Foreign Legion. During the Battle of Magenta, General Espinasse died by his side.

=== Mexico ===
In the Franco-Mexican War he served in the siege of Puebla. He also marched towards Monterrey, then through the Sierra Madre Oriental towards Mazatlán. Having become general of division (1864), Maximilian I put him in charge of the "Great Command of the Northwest" and was sent as a forlorn hope troop to Sonora and Sinaloa. He burned the city of San Sebastián and shot the rebel Nicolás Romero and his companions.

=== France ===
In 1870, in the Franco-Prussian War, Castagny became Commander of a division of the 3rd Corps of Infantry. At Forbach, he fought to free the 2nd corps, besieged in Metz with the Army of the Rhine, and was at the Battle of Borny–Colombey, where he was seriously wounded.

After returning from captivity, Castagny was assigned to the General Staff in France in 1872. He retired in 1878, first to the region of Nantes and then to Paris, before moving permanently to a hotel in Belle-Île-en-Mer.

=== Death ===
He died in 1900 in his bed, in his hometown of Vannes (Morbihan) at the age of 93, after a 43-year military career.

== Military distinctions ==
- The Legion of Honour: Knight (October 21, 1838); Officer (April 11, 1850); Commander (June 12, 1856); Grand Officer (August 15, 1860)
- Commemorative medal of the 1859 Italian Campaign (October 18, 1859)
- Commemorative medal of the Mexico Expedition (April 21, 1864)
- Companion of the Order of the Bath (UK, April 26, 1856)
- Crimea Medal (UK, December 31, 1856)
- Commander of the Order of the Medjidie (Turkey, March 1856)
- Medal of Military Valor of Sardinia (January 15, 1857)
- Commander of the Order of Saints Maurice and Lazarus (February 29, 1860)
- Grand Cross of the Order of Our Lady of Guadalupe (Mexico, April 10, 1866)
