= James Houston Thomas =

American politician (1808–1876)

Member of the U.S. House of Representatives from Tennessee's 6th district
- In office March 4, 1847 – March 3, 1851
- Preceded by: Barclay Martin
- Succeeded by: William H. Polk

Member of the U.S. House of Representatives from Tennessee's 6th district
- In office March 4, 1859 – March 3, 1861
- Preceded by: George W. Jones
- Succeeded by: Samuel M. Arnell

Personal details
- Born: September 22, 1808 Iredell County, North Carolina
- Died: August 4, 1876 (aged 67) Fayetteville, Tennessee
- Party: Democratic
- Spouse: Margaret Meeds Stevens Thomas
- Children: John Addison Thomas
- Education: Jackson College, Columbia, Tennessee
- Profession: lawyer; politician

James Houston Thomas (September 22, 1808 – August 4, 1876) was an American politician and a member of the United States House of Representatives for Tennessee's 6th congressional district.

== Biography ==
Thomas was born in Iredell County, North Carolina on September 22, 1808. He attended the rural schools and graduated from Jackson College, Columbia, Tennessee in 1830. He studied law, was admitted to the bar in 1831, and commenced practice in Columbia, Tennessee. He owned slaves. He married Margaret Meeds Stevens.

== Career ==
From 1836 to 1842, Thomas served as Attorney General of Tennessee.

Thomas was elected as a Democrat to the Thirtieth and Thirty-first Congresses. Though he was not a successful candidate for re-election in 1850 to the Thirty-second Congress, he was later elected to the Thirty-sixth Congress. He served from March 4, 1847 to March 3, 1851 and from March 4, 1859 to March 3, 1861. He resumed the practice of law in Columbia, Tennessee. He was a Delegate from Tennessee to the Confederate Provisional Congress from 1861 to 1862.

== Death ==
Thomas died in Fayetteville, Tennessee in Lincoln County on August 4, 1876 (age 67 years, 317 days). He is interred at St. John's Cemetery in Ashwood in Maury County, Tennessee.

U.S. House of Representatives
Preceded by Barclay Martin	Member of the U.S. House of Representatives from Tennessee's 6th congressional district 1847–1851	Succeeded by William H. Polk
Preceded by George W. Jones	Member of the U.S. House of Representatives from Tennessee's 6th congressional district 1859–1861	Succeeded by Samuel M. Arnell
Confederate States House of Representatives
Preceded by none	Representative to the Provisional Confederate Congress from Tennessee; 1861	Succeeded by none
