= Zacualtipán =

Zacualtipán de Ángeles
- Town and municipality
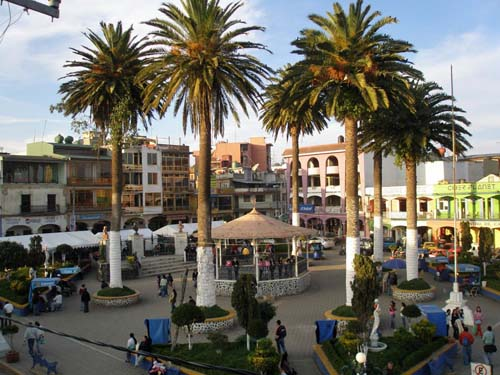

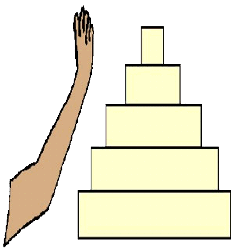
- Glyph and coat of arms

- Location within Hidalgo Location within Mexico
- Coordinates: 20°39′N 98°39′W
- Country: Mexico
- State: Hidalgo
- Municipality: Zacualtipán de Ángeles

Government
  - Federal electoral district: Hidalgo's 1st

Area
  - Total: 241.6 km^{2} (93.3 sq mi)

Population (2020)
  - Total: 38,155
- Time zone: UTC-6 (Zona Centro)
- Postal code: 43200–43225
- Website: zacualtipan.hidalgo.gob.mx

Zacualtipán (formally: Zacualtipán de Ángeles, for Felipe Ángeles, born there in 1868) is a town and one of the 84 municipalities of Hidalgo, in central-eastern Mexico. The municipality covers an area of 241.6 km^{2}.

In 2020, the municipality had a total population of 38,155, up from 25,987 in 2005.

== History ==
The town of Zacualtipán was the site of the action of Sequalteplan on February 25, 1848. It was a surprise attack by a mounted American force under Gen. Joseph Lane that defeated a Mexican guerrilla force under Celedonio Dómeco de Jarauta during the Mexican–American War.

== Geography ==
=== Climate ===
Climate data for Zacualtipan
Month	Jan	Feb	Mar	Apr	May	Jun	Jul	Aug	Sep	Oct	Nov	Dec	Year
Mean daily maximum °C (°F)	16.5 (61.7)	18.1 (64.6)	21.4 (70.5)	23.6 (74.5)	24.3 (75.7)	22 (72)	20.3 (68.5)	20.8 (69.4)	19.6 (67.3)	18.5 (65.3)	17.6 (63.7)	16.8 (62.2)	20 (68)
Mean daily minimum °C (°F)	2.3 (36.1)	3.2 (37.8)	5.3 (41.5)	7.3 (45.1)	8.5 (47.3)	8.8 (47.8)	8.1 (46.6)	8.1 (46.6)	7.9 (46.2)	6 (43)	4.0 (39.2)	2.7 (36.9)	6.0 (42.8)
Average precipitation mm (inches)	41 (1.6)	30 (1.2)	33 (1.3)	48 (1.9)	66 (2.6)	200 (7.8)	210 (8.1)	200 (8)	370 (14.4)	210 (8.2)	89 (3.5)	38 (1.5)	1,530 (60.1)
Source: Weatherbase
