= Celedonio Dómeco de Jarauta =

Spanish-Mexican priest and guerilla leader (1814–1848)

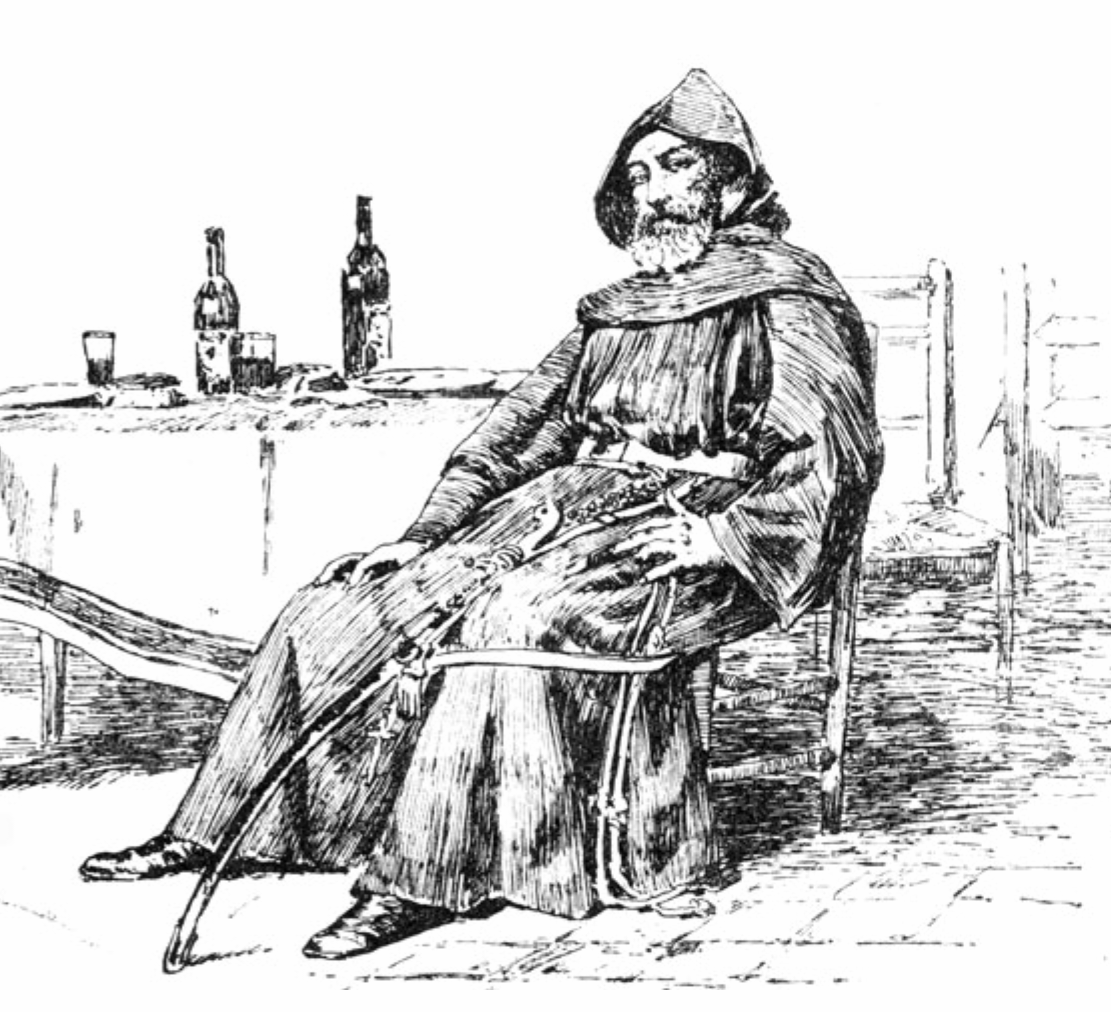
- Fraile Guerrillero, 19th century illustration that has become popularly associated with Jarauta
- Born: 3 March 1814; Zaragoza, Spain
- Died: 19 July 1848 (aged 34); Guanajuato, Mexico
- Cause of death: Execution by firing squad
- Military career
- Allegiance: Carlists; Mexico
- Branch: Mexican Army
- Service years: 1846-1848
- Rank: General
- Battles/wars: First Carlist War; Mexican–American War; Siege of Veracruz; Battle for Mexico City; Battle of Huamantla; Action of Sequalteplan; Plan de Los Lagos Revolt

Celedonio Dómeco de Jarauta (3 March 1814 – 19 July 1848) commonly known as Padre Jarauta, was a Spanish-born Mexican Catholic priest, soldier and guerrilla leader. He became one of the most prominent and effective irregular commanders opposing the United States Army during the Mexican–American War. After the war concluded, he continued armed opposition to the Treaty of Guadalupe Hidalgo and was executed by Mexican government forces.

== Early life ==
Celedonio Dómeco de Jarauta was born in Zaragoza, Spain, on 3 March 1814. He studied humanities and philosophy and entered the Franciscan Order. He fought as a Carlist in the First Carlist War. After the conflict and the exclaustration of religious orders, he emigrated to Havana, Cuba, and took Holy Orders becoming a priest. In 1844 he was granted a parish in Veracruz, and immigrated permanently to Mexico where he gained popularity among local populations

== Mexican–American War ==
In 1847, When U.S. forces landed near Veracruz, Jarauta rallied local rancheros to harass the invading forces on the beaches of Collado. He was appointed chaplain of the 2nd Infantry Battalion under Colonel Arzamendi and later became head of the field hospital. After the fall of Veracruz and the U.S. advance inland, he left regular service and organized companies of local guerrillas.

Operating primarily in the Sotavento region of Veracruz, Jarauta’s forces specialized in harassing supply convoys, couriers, and small detachments along the critical Veracruz-Puebla road by employing classic irregular tactics using mobility, and knowledge of the terrain to their advantage. Jarauta enforced strict discipline, executing deserters and those who traded with the enemy. He reportedly liberated prisoners from the penal facility at Cosamaloapan to bolster his ranks and shared captured supplies with his men and local civilians.

In September 1847, as U.S. forces marched towards Mexico City following the Battle of Chapultepec, Jarauta joined other priests, local civilians and dissenting Mexican military personnel in organizing popular resistance. This action delayed the full U.S. entry into the capital for at least three days and inflicted heavy casualties.

After the fall of Mexico City, Jarauta participated in the Battle of Huamantla and on January 19, 1848 he published a broadside in Puebla, titled Viva la República Mexicana: Mexicanos, urging continued resistance against U.S. forces. After the Treaty of Guadalupe Hildalgo was signed on 2 February 1848, Jarauta refused to acknowledge it and disband his troops. On 25 February 1848, an American force under General Joseph Lane made a forced march which surprised and defeated the force of Padre Jarauta at Zacualtipan in the action of Sequalteplan, but he was able to flee and continue armed resistance.

== Plan de Los Lagos Revolt ==
On 1 June 1848, from Lagos de Moreno, Jalisco, he issued the Plan of Lagos de Moreno. The manifesto denounced President Manuel de la Peña y Peña’s government as traitorous for ceding national territory. It called for the states to resume their sovereignty, replace the central government, and organize resistance. Jarauta was soon joined by former president General Mariano Paredes and former governor of Guanajuato Manuel Doblado. By mid-July their combined forces occupied the city of Guanajuato.

Mexican government forces under Anastasio Bustamante moved against the rebels. On 19 July 1848, Jarauta was leading a reconnaissance with approximately 50 men near the La Valenciana mines outside Guanajuato. He was surprised, captured, and turned over to Bustamante’s command. Paredes and Doblado escaped.

Jarauta was executed by firing squad at the La Valenciana mines on the orders of Bustamante. In 1853, President Antonio López de Santa Anna issued a decree honoring his memory and a modest memorial column was erected near the site of his execution.
