= 1966 Tennessee gubernatorial election =

- November 8, 1966

Nominee	Buford Ellington	H.L. Crowder	Charlie Moffett
Party	Democratic	Independent	Independent
Popular vote	532,998	64,602	50,221
Percentage	81.18%	9.84%	7.65%
- County results Ellington: 60–70% 70–80% 80–90% >90%
Governor before election
Frank G. Clement
Democratic
Elected Governor
Buford Ellington
Democratic

The 1966 Tennessee gubernatorial election was held on November 8, 1966, to elect the next governor of Tennessee. Incumbent Democratic governor Frank G. Clement was term-limited and was prohibited by the Constitution of Tennessee from seeking another term. Former Democratic governor Buford Ellington defeated both independent candidates H.L. Crowder and Charlie Moffett with 81.2% of the vote.

In the primary, Ellington he defeated John Jay Hooker, who was a friend of former governor Gordon Browning, and had been endorsed by the Nashville Tennessean. Ellington was endorsed by President Lyndon B. Johnson, and the Nashville Banner. By this time, Ellington had shifted his position on segregation, and openly supported an end to the long-standing practice.

Tensions grew between Governor Frank G. Clement and Ellington leading up to the general election, as Ellington refused to endorse Clement in his U.S. Senate primary campaign against Ross Bass. Clement attempted to spend the state's budget surplus to ensure the Ellington administration did not inherit it.

== Background ==
In early 1965, President Lyndon B. Johnson appointed Buford Ellington as Director of the Office of Emergency Planning (later integrated into FEMA). During the Selma to Montgomery marches, which took place at the height of the civil rights movement in March of that year, Ellington played a key role in establishing contact and talks between President Johnson and Governor George Wallace of Alabama. The state provided protection for marchers in the last march. In September, Ellington helped organize federal relief efforts in the wake of Hurricane Betsy.

== Aftermath ==
In 1967, Buford Ellington appointed African American Hosea T. Lockard to his cabinet as administrative assistant; he was the first black cabinet member in state history. On April 4, 1968, the assassination of Martin Luther King Jr. in Memphis led Ellington to immediately mobilize the National Guard, to prevent rioting in the city.

In September 1967, Ellington signed a bill repealing the Butler Act, the 1925 law that had outlawed the teaching of the Theory of Evolution in state schools.

== Republican primary ==
The Tennessee Republican Party did not field an official nominee in the general election. Physician Charlie Moffett sought to qualify for the Republican primary but initially had his petition rejected by state party officials on a filing deadline technicality. In Koella v. State (1966), the Tennessee Supreme Court ordered that Moffett’s name be placed on the Republican primary ballot. Despite this ruling, no Republican appeared as a certified nominee in November, and Moffett instead ran as an independent alongside other minor candidates. Analysts note that the absence of a Republican contender reflected both procedural disputes within the party.

== Democratic primary ==
Primary elections were held on August 4, 1966. 32.5% of the voting age population participated in the Democratic primary.

=== Democratic primary ===
==== Candidates ====
- Buford Ellington, former governor
- John Jay Hooker, attorney

==== Results ====
Democratic primary results
Party	Candidate	Votes	%
Democratic	Buford Ellington	413,950	53.48%
Democratic	John Jay Hooker	360,105	46.52%
Total votes		774,055	100.00%

== General election ==
=== Candidates ===
Major party candidate

- Buford Ellington, Democratic

Other candidates

- H.L. Crowder, Independent
- Charlie Moffett, Independent
- Charles Gordon Vick, Independent

=== Results ===
1966 Tennessee gubernatorial election
Party	Candidate	Votes	%	±%
Democratic	Buford Ellington	532,998	81.18%	
Independent	H.L. Crowder	64,602	9.84%	
Independent	Charlie Moffett	50,221	7.65%	
Independent	Charles Gordon Vick	8,407	1.28%	
Write-in		338	0.05%	
Majority		532,998		
Turnout		656,566		
Democratic hold		Swing		

== See also ==
- 1966 United States gubernatorial elections
- 1966 United States Senate election in Tennessee

== Works cited ==
- Steed, Robert; Moreland, Laurence; Baker, Tod, eds. (1980). Party Politics in the South. Praeger Publishers. ISBN 0030565863.
