= 88th United States Congress =

1963–1965 U.S. Congress

←	87th	89th	→
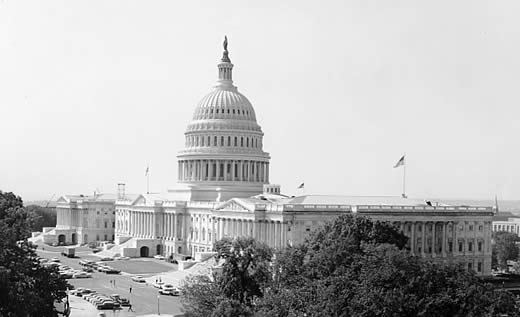
- United States Capitol (1962)

Overview
- Legislative body: United States Congress
- Jurisdiction: United States
- Term: January 3, 1963 – January 3, 1965

Senate
- Members: 100
- President: Lyndon B. Johnson (D) (Note: U.S. Vice President Lyndon B. Johnson's term as President of the Senate ended on November 22, 1963, when ascending to the presidency, President pro tempore Carl Hayden acted his duties as the President of the Senate prior to the ratification of the Twenty-fifth Amendment.) (until November 22, 1963); Vacant (from November 22, 1963)
- President pro tempore: Carl Hayden (D)
- Party control: Democratic

House of Representatives
- Members: 435
- Speaker: John McCormack (D)
- Party control: Democratic

Sessions
- 1st: January 9, 1963 – December 30, 1963
- 2nd: January 7, 1964 – October 3, 1964

The 88th United States Congress was a meeting of the legislative branch of the United States federal government, composed of the United States Senate and the United States House of Representatives. It met in Washington, D.C., from January 3, 1963, to January 3, 1965, during the final months of the presidency of John F. Kennedy, and the first years of the presidency of his successor, Lyndon B. Johnson. The apportionment of seats in this House of Representatives was based on the 1960 United States census, and the number of members was again 435 (it had temporarily been 437 in order to seat one member each from recently admitted states of Alaska and Hawaii).

Both chambers maintained a Democratic majority - including a filibuster-proof supermajority in the Senate - and with President Kennedy, the Democrats maintained an overall federal government trifecta.

To date, this is the earliest Congress with members still living: Don Fuqua, Alec G. Olson, and William J. Green III.

== Major events ==
- November 22, 1963: Vice President Lyndon B. Johnson became President of the United States on the death of President John F. Kennedy.
- March 30 – June 10, 1964: The longest filibuster in the history of the Senate was waged against the Civil Rights Act of 1964, with 57 days of debate over a 73-day period. It ended when the Senate voted 71–29 to invoke cloture, with the filibuster carried out by southern members of the Democratic Party, the first successful cloture motion on a civil rights bill.
- August 2–4, 1964: Gulf of Tonkin Incident
- November 3, 1964: President Lyndon Johnson is elected to a full term in the 1964 United States Presidential election, defeating Republican nominee Barry Goldwater.

== Major legislation ==
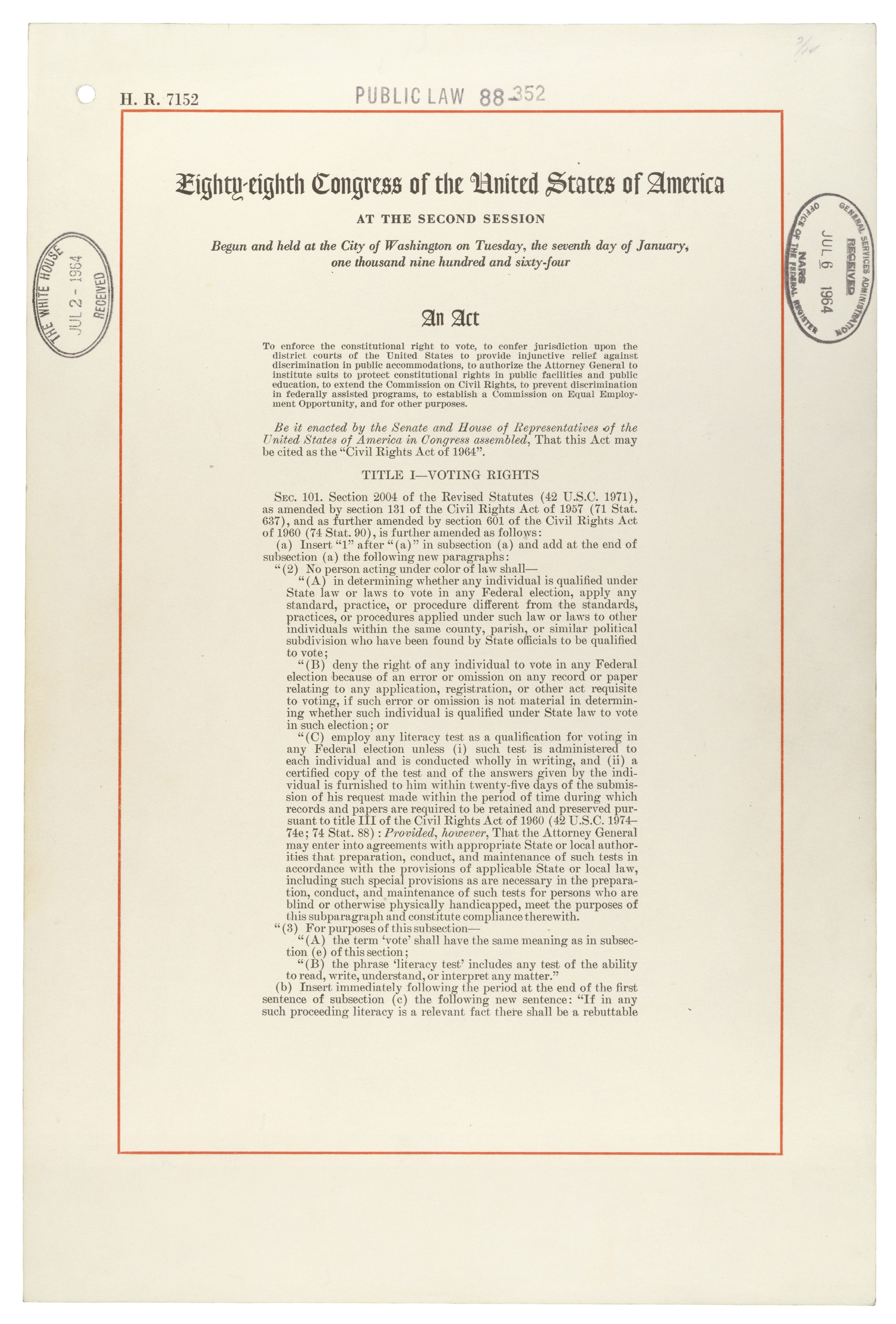
First page of the Civil Rights Act of 1964

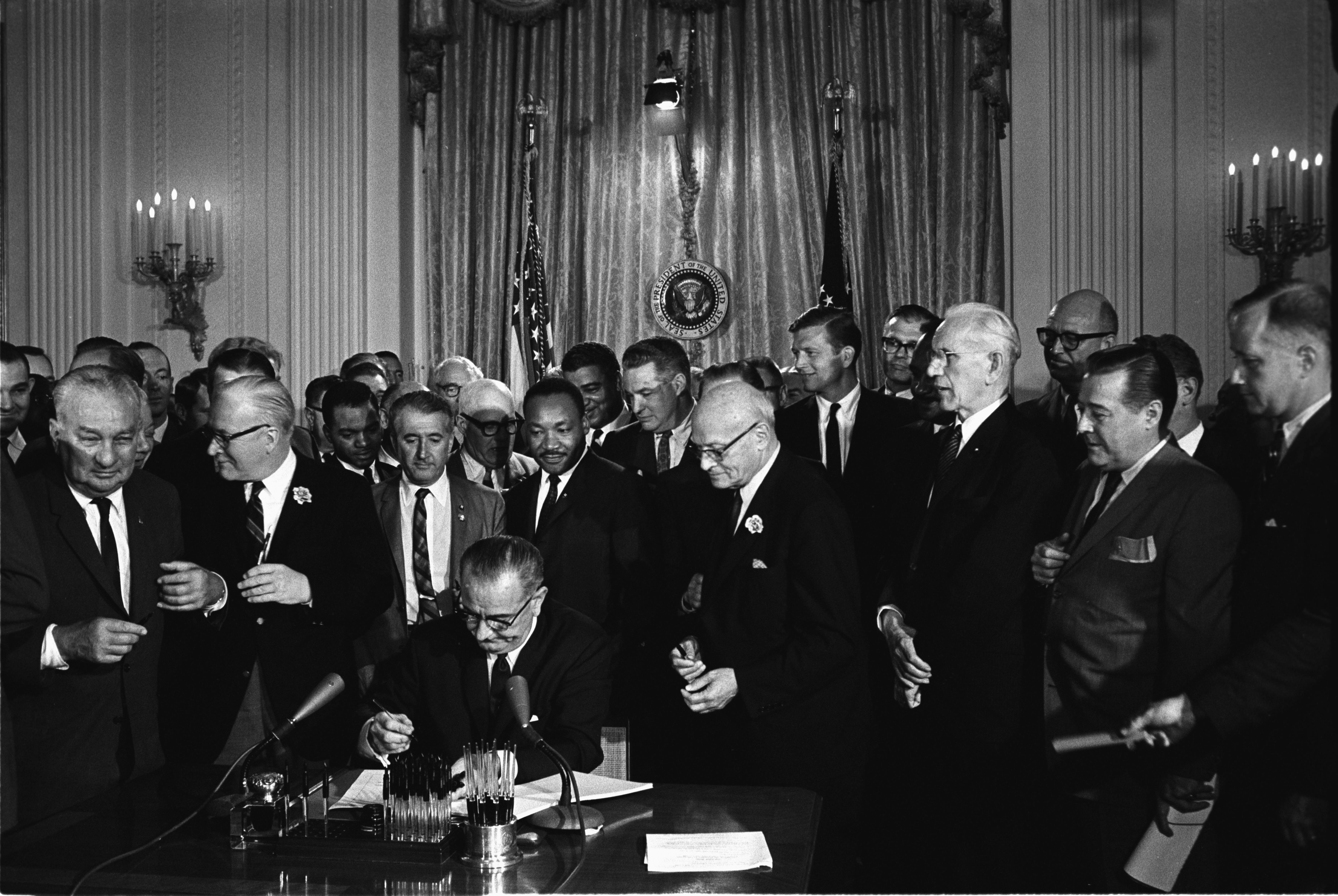
President Johnson signs the Civil Rights Act of 1964

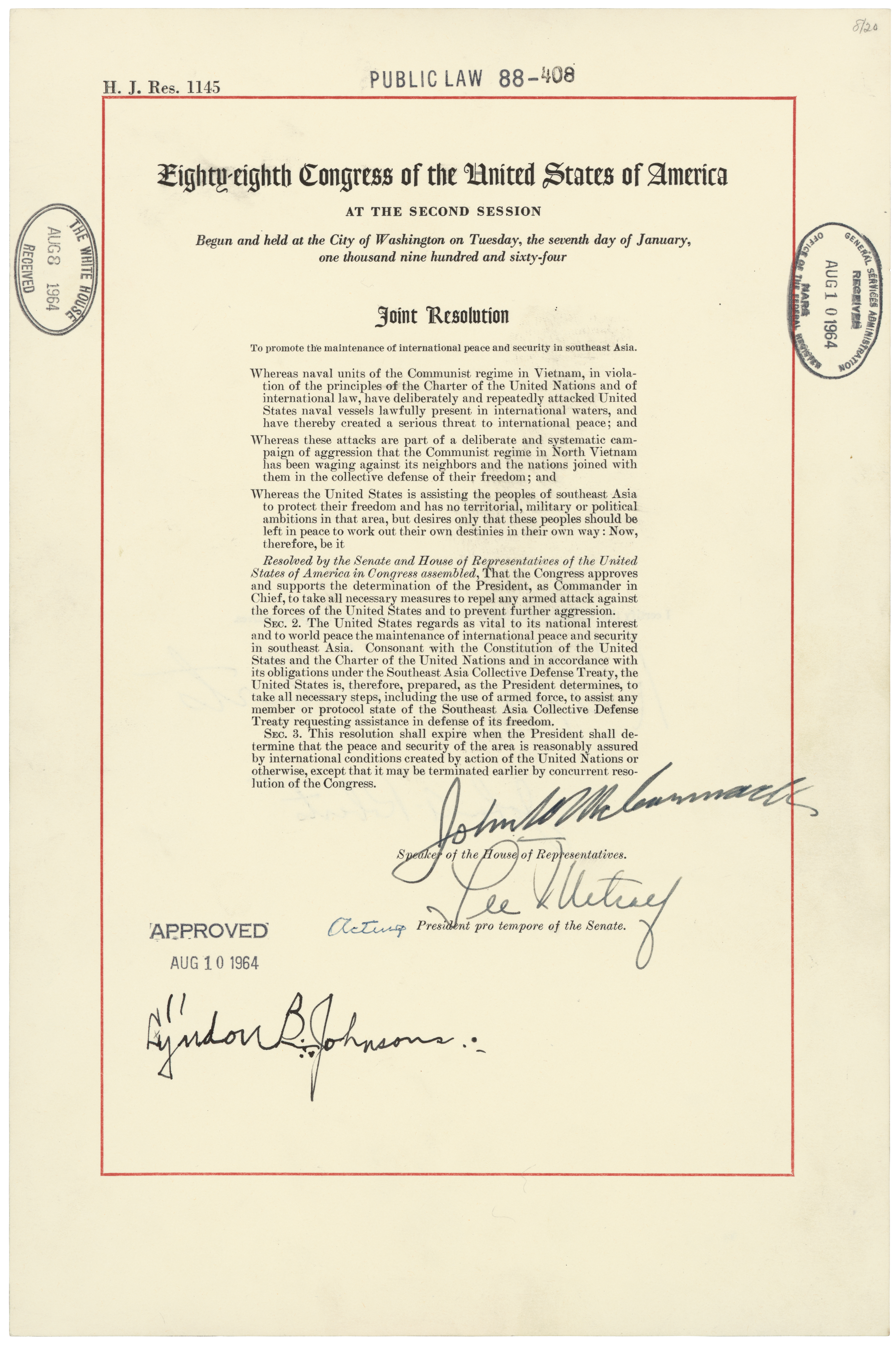
Tonkin Gulf Resolution

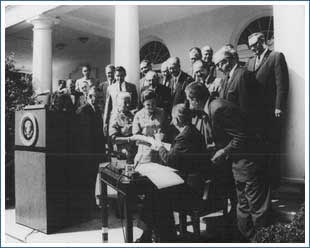
President Johnson signs the Wilderness Act of 1964

- June 10, 1963: Equal Pay Act, Pub. L. 88–38
- October 17, 1963: Department of Defense Appropriations Act, Pub. L. 88–149
- October 31, 1963: Community Mental Health Centers Act, Pub. L. 88–164, title II, including Mental Retardation Facilities Construction Act
- December 17, 1963: Clean Air Act, Pub. L. 88–206
- February 11, 1964: Library Services and Construction Act, Pub. L. 88–269
- July 2, 1964: Civil Rights Act of 1964, Pub. L. 88–352
- July 9, 1964: Urban Mass Transportation Act of 1964 (Federal Transit Act), Pub. L. 88–365
- August 7, 1964: Tonkin Gulf Resolution, Pub. L. 88–408
- August 20, 1964: Economic Opportunity Act of 1964, Pub. L. 88–452
- August 31, 1964: Food Stamp Act of 1964, Pub. L. 88–525
- September 3, 1964: Wilderness Act, Pub. L. 88–577
- September 4, 1964: Nurse Training Act, Pub. L. 88–581

== Constitutional amendments ==
- January 23, 1964: Twenty-fourth Amendment to the United States Constitution, prohibiting both Congress and the states from conditioning the right to vote in federal elections on payment of a poll tax or other types of tax, was ratified by the requisite number of states (then 38) to become part of the Constitution

== Party summary ==
=== Senate ===
	Party (shading shows control)		Total	Vacant
	Democratic (D)	Republican (R)	Total	Vacant
End of previous congress	62	37	99	1
Begin	65	33	98	2
End	66	34	100	0
Final voting share	66.0%	34.0%		
Beginning of next congress	68	32	100	0

=== House of Representatives ===
	Party (shading shows control)		Total	Vacant
	Democratic (D)	Republican (R)	Total	Vacant
End of previous congress	260	174	434	3
Begin	258	176	434	1
End	253	177	430	5
Final voting share	58.8%	41.2%		
Beginning of next congress	295	140	435	0

== Leadership ==
=== Senate ===
- President: Lyndon B. Johnson (D), until November 22, 1963; thereafter vacant
- President pro tempore: Carl Hayden (D)
- Permanent Acting President pro tempore: Lee Metcalf (D), from June 15, 1963

==== Majority (Democratic) leadership ====
- Majority Leader: Mike Mansfield
- Majority Whip: Hubert Humphrey
- Caucus Secretary: George Smathers

==== Minority (Republican) leadership ====
- Minority Leader: Everett Dirksen
- Minority Whip: Thomas Kuchel
- Republican Conference Chairman: Leverett Saltonstall
- Republican Conference Secretary: Milton Young
- National Senatorial Committee Chair: Thruston Ballard Morton
- Policy Committee Chairman: Bourke B. Hickenlooper

=== House of Representatives ===
- Speaker: John W. McCormack (D)

==== Majority (Democratic) leadership ====
- Majority Leader: Carl Albert
- Majority Whip: Hale Boggs
- Democratic Caucus Chairman: Francis E. Walter, until May 31, 1963
  - Albert Thomas, from January 21, 1964
- Democratic Campaign Committee Chairman: Michael J. Kirwan

==== Minority (Republican) leadership ====
- Minority Leader: Charles A. Halleck
- Minority Whip: Leslie C. Arends
- Republican Conference Chairman: Gerald Ford
- Policy Committee Chairman: John W. Byrnes
- Republican Campaign Committee Chairman: Bob Wilson

== Caucuses ==
- House Democratic Caucus
- Senate Democratic Caucus

== Members ==
=== Senate ===
Senators are popularly elected statewide every two years, with one-third beginning new six-year terms with each Congress. Senators are ordered first by state, and then by class. Preceding the names in the list below are Senate class numbers, which indicate the cycle of their election, In this Congress, Class 1 meant their term ended with this Congress, requiring reelection in 1964; Class 2 meant their term began in the last Congress, requiring reelection in 1966; and Class 3 meant their term began in this Congress, requiring reelection in 1968.

==== Alabama ====
▌2. John J. Sparkman (D)
▌3. J. Lister Hill (D)

==== Alaska ====
▌2. Bob Bartlett (D)
▌3. Ernest Gruening (D)

==== Arizona ====
▌1. Barry Goldwater (R)
▌3. Carl Hayden (D)

==== Arkansas ====
▌2. John L. McClellan (D)
▌3. J. William Fulbright (D)

==== California ====
▌1. Clair Engle (D), until July 30, 1964

▌Pierre Salinger (D), August 4, 1964 – December 31, 1964
▌George Murphy (R), from January 1, 1965

▌3. Thomas Kuchel (R)

==== Colorado ====
▌2. Gordon Allott (R)
▌3. Peter H. Dominick (R)

==== Connecticut ====
▌1. Thomas J. Dodd (D)
▌3. Abraham Ribicoff (D)

==== Delaware ====
▌1. John J. Williams (R)
▌2. J. Caleb Boggs (R)

==== Florida ====
▌1. Spessard Holland (D)
▌3. George Smathers (D)

==== Georgia ====
▌2. Richard Russell Jr. (D)
▌3. Herman Talmadge (D)

==== Hawaii ====
▌1. Hiram Fong (R)
▌3. Daniel Inouye (D)

==== Idaho ====
▌2. Len Jordan (R)
▌3. Frank Church (D)

==== Illinois ====
▌2. Paul Douglas (D)
▌3. Everett M. Dirksen (R)

==== Indiana ====
▌1. Vance Hartke (D)
▌3. Birch Bayh (D)

==== Iowa ====
▌2. Jack Miller (R)
▌3. Bourke B. Hickenlooper (R)

==== Kansas ====
▌2. James B. Pearson (R)
▌3. Frank Carlson (R)

==== Kentucky ====
▌2. John Sherman Cooper (R)
▌3. Thruston Ballard Morton (R)

==== Louisiana ====
▌2. Allen J. Ellender (D)
▌3. Russell B. Long (D)

==== Maine ====
▌1. Edmund Muskie (D)
▌2. Margaret Chase Smith (R)

==== Maryland ====
▌1. James Glenn Beall (R)
▌3. Daniel Brewster (D)

==== Massachusetts ====
▌1. Ted Kennedy (D)
▌2. Leverett Saltonstall (R)

==== Michigan ====
▌1. Philip Hart (D)
▌2. Patrick V. McNamara (D)

==== Minnesota ====
▌1. Eugene McCarthy (DFL) (Note: The Minnesota Democratic–Farmer–Labor Party (DFL) and the North Dakota Democratic-Nonpartisan League Party (D-NPL) are the Minnesota and North Dakota affiliates of the U.S. Democratic Party and are counted as Democrats.)
▌2. Hubert Humphrey (DFL), until December 29, 1964

▌Walter Mondale (DFL), from December 30, 1964

==== Mississippi ====
▌1. John C. Stennis (D)
▌2. James Eastland (D)

==== Missouri ====
▌1. Stuart Symington (D)
▌3. Edward V. Long (D)

==== Montana ====
▌1. Mike Mansfield (D)
▌2. Lee Metcalf (D)

==== Nebraska ====
▌1. Roman Hruska (R)
▌2. Carl Curtis (R)

==== Nevada ====
▌1. Howard Cannon (D)
▌3. Alan Bible (D)

==== New Hampshire ====
▌2. Thomas J. McIntyre (D)
▌3. Norris Cotton (R)

==== New Jersey ====
▌1. Harrison A. Williams (D)
▌2. Clifford P. Case (R)

==== New Mexico ====
▌1. Edwin L. Mechem (R), until November 3, 1964

▌Joseph Montoya (D), from November 4, 1964

▌2. Clinton P. Anderson (D)

==== New York ====
▌1. Kenneth Keating (R)
▌3. Jacob Javits (R)

==== North Carolina ====
▌2. B. Everett Jordan (D)
▌3. Sam Ervin (D)

==== North Dakota ====
▌1. Quentin Burdick (D-NPL)
▌3. Milton Young (R)

==== Ohio ====
▌1. Stephen M. Young (D)
▌3. Frank Lausche (D)

==== Oklahoma ====
▌2. J. Howard Edmondson (D), January 7, 1963 – November 3, 1964

▌Fred R. Harris (D), from November 4, 1964

▌3. A. S. Mike Monroney (D)

==== Oregon ====
▌2. Maurine Neuberger (D)
▌3. Wayne Morse (D)

==== Pennsylvania ====
▌1. Hugh Scott (R)
▌3. Joseph S. Clark Jr. (D)

==== Rhode Island ====
▌1. John Pastore (D)
▌2. Claiborne Pell (D)

==== South Carolina ====
▌▌2. Strom Thurmond (D) until September 16, 1964, then (R)
▌3. Olin D. Johnston (D)

==== South Dakota ====
▌2. Karl E. Mundt (R)
▌3. George McGovern (D)

==== Tennessee ====
▌1. Albert Gore Sr. (D)
▌2. Estes Kefauver (D), until August 10, 1963

▌Herbert S. Walters (D), August 20, 1963 – November 3, 1964
▌Ross Bass (D), from November 4, 1964

==== Texas ====
▌1. Ralph Yarborough (D)
▌2. John Tower (R)

==== Utah ====
▌1. Frank Moss (D)
▌3. Wallace F. Bennett (R)

==== Vermont ====
▌1. Winston L. Prouty (R)
▌3. George Aiken (R)

==== Virginia ====
▌1. Harry F. Byrd (D)
▌2. A. Willis Robertson (D)

==== Washington ====
▌1. Henry M. Jackson (D)
▌3. Warren G. Magnuson (D)

==== West Virginia ====
▌1. Robert Byrd (D)
▌2. Jennings Randolph (D)

==== Wisconsin ====
▌1. William Proxmire (D)
▌3. Gaylord Nelson (D), from January 8, 1963

==== Wyoming ====
▌1. Gale W. McGee (D)
▌2. Milward Simpson (R)

Senators' party membership by state at the opening of the 88th Congress in January 1963 2 Democrats 1 Democrat and 1 Republican 2 Republicans

=== House of Representatives ===
==== Alabama ====
▌At-large. George Huddleston Jr. (D)
▌At-large. George M. Grant (D)
▌At-large. George W. Andrews (D)
▌At-large. Kenneth A. Roberts (D)
▌At-large. Albert Rains (D)
▌At-large. Armistead I. Selden Jr. (D)
▌At-large. Carl Elliott (D)
▌At-large. Robert E. Jones Jr. (D)

==== Alaska ====
▌At-large. Ralph Julian Rivers (D)

==== Arizona ====
▌1. John Jacob Rhodes (R)
▌2. Mo Udall (D)
▌3. George F. Senner Jr. (D)

==== Arkansas ====
▌1. Ezekiel C. Gathings (D)
▌2. Wilbur Mills (D)
▌3. James William Trimble (D)
▌4. Oren Harris (D)

==== California ====
▌1. Donald H. Clausen (R), from January 22, 1963
▌2. Harold T. Johnson (D)
▌3. John E. Moss (D)
▌4. Robert L. Leggett (D)
▌5. John F. Shelley (D), until January 7, 1964

▌Phillip Burton (D), from February 18, 1964

▌6. William S. Mailliard (R)
▌7. Jeffery Cohelan (D)
▌8. George P. Miller (D)
▌9. Don Edwards (D)
▌10. Charles Gubser (R)
▌11. J. Arthur Younger (R)
▌12. Burt Talcott (R)
▌13. Charles M. Teague (R)
▌14. John F. Baldwin Jr. (R)
▌15. John J. McFall (D)
▌16. B. F. Sisk (D)
▌17. Cecil R. King (D)
▌18. Harlan Hagen (D)
▌19. Chester E. Holifield (D)
▌20. H. Allen Smith (R)
▌21. Augustus Hawkins (D)
▌22. James C. Corman (D)
▌23. Clyde Doyle (D), until March 14, 1963

▌Del M. Clawson (R), from June 11, 1963

▌24. Glenard P. Lipscomb (R)
▌25. Ronald B. Cameron (D)
▌26. James Roosevelt (D)
▌27. Everett G. Burkhalter (D)
▌28. Alphonzo E. Bell Jr. (R)
▌29. George Brown Jr. (D)
▌30. Edward R. Roybal (D)
▌31. Charles H. Wilson (D)
▌32. Craig Hosmer (R)
▌33. Harry R. Sheppard (D)
▌34. Richard T. Hanna (D)
▌35. James B. Utt (R)
▌36. Bob Wilson (R)
▌37. Lionel Van Deerlin (D)
▌38. Patrick M. Martin (R)

==== Colorado ====
▌1. Byron G. Rogers (D)
▌2. Donald G. Brotzman (R)
▌3. John Chenoweth (R)
▌4. Wayne N. Aspinall (D)

==== Connecticut ====
▌1. Emilio Q. Daddario (D)
▌2. William St. Onge (D)
▌3. Robert Giaimo (D)
▌4. Abner W. Sibal (R)
▌5. John S. Monagan (D)
▌At-large. Bernard F. Grabowski (D)

==== Delaware ====
▌At-large. Harris McDowell (D)

==== Florida ====
▌1. Robert L. F. Sikes (D)
▌2. Charles E. Bennett (D)
▌3. Claude Pepper (D)
▌4. Dante Fascell (D)
▌5. Syd Herlong (D)
▌6. Paul Rogers (D)
▌7. James A. Haley (D)
▌8. Donald Ray Matthews (D)
▌9. Don Fuqua (D)
▌10. Sam Gibbons (D)
▌11. Edward Gurney (R)
▌12. William C. Cramer (R)

==== Georgia ====
▌1. George Elliott Hagan (D)
▌2. J. L. Pilcher (D)
▌3. Tic Forrester (D)
▌4. John Flynt (D)
▌5. Charles L. Weltner (D)
▌6. Carl Vinson (D)
▌7. John William Davis (D)
▌8. J. Russell Tuten (D)
▌9. Phillip M. Landrum (D)
▌10. Robert Grier Stephens Jr. (D)

==== Hawaii ====
▌At-large. Thomas Gill (D)
▌At-large. Spark Matsunaga (D)

==== Idaho ====
▌1. Compton I. White Jr. (D)
▌2. Ralph R. Harding (D)

==== Illinois ====
▌1. William L. Dawson (D)
▌2. Barratt O'Hara (D)
▌3. William T. Murphy (D)
▌4. Ed Derwinski (R)
▌5. John C. Kluczynski (D)
▌6. Thomas J. O'Brien (D), until April 14, 1964
▌7. Roland V. Libonati (D)
▌8. Dan Rostenkowski (D)
▌9. Edward Rowan Finnegan (D), until December 6, 1964
▌10. Harold R. Collier (R)
▌11. Roman Pucinski (D)
▌12. Robert McClory (R)
▌13. Donald Rumsfeld (R)
▌14. Elmer J. Hoffman (R)
▌15. Charlotte Thompson Reid (R)
▌16. John B. Anderson (R)
▌17. Leslie C. Arends (R)
▌18. Robert H. Michel (R)
▌19. Robert T. McLoskey (R)
▌20. Paul Findley (R)
▌21. Kenneth J. Gray (D)
▌22. William L. Springer (R)
▌23. George E. Shipley (D)
▌24. Melvin Price (D)

==== Indiana ====
▌1. Ray Madden (D)
▌2. Charles A. Halleck (R)
▌3. John Brademas (D)
▌4. E. Ross Adair (R)
▌5. J. Edward Roush (D)
▌6. Richard L. Roudebush (R)
▌7. William G. Bray (R)
▌8. Winfield K. Denton (D)
▌9. Earl Wilson (R)
▌10. Ralph Harvey (R)
▌11. Donald C. Bruce (R)

==== Iowa ====
▌1. Fred Schwengel (R)
▌2. James E. Bromwell (R)
▌3. H. R. Gross (R)
▌4. John Henry Kyl (R)
▌5. Neal Edward Smith (D)
▌6. Charles B. Hoeven (R)
▌7. Ben F. Jensen (R)

==== Kansas ====
▌1. Bob Dole (R)
▌2. William H. Avery (R)
▌3. Robert Ellsworth (R)
▌4. Garner E. Shriver (R)
▌5. Joe Skubitz (R)

==== Kentucky ====
▌1. Frank Stubblefield (D)
▌2. William Natcher (D)
▌3. Gene Snyder (R)
▌4. Frank Chelf (D)
▌5. Eugene Siler (R)
▌6. John C. Watts (D)
▌7. Carl D. Perkins (D)

==== Louisiana ====
▌1. F. Edward Hébert (D)
▌2. Hale Boggs (D)
▌3. Edwin E. Willis (D)
▌4. Joe Waggonner (D)
▌5. Otto Passman (D)
▌6. James H. Morrison (D)
▌7. T. Ashton Thompson (D)
▌8. Gillis William Long (D)

==== Maine ====
▌1. Stanley R. Tupper (R)
▌2. Clifford McIntire (R)

==== Maryland ====
▌1. Rogers Morton (R)
▌2. Clarence Long (D)
▌3. Edward Garmatz (D)
▌4. George Hyde Fallon (D)
▌5. Richard Lankford (D)
▌6. Charles Mathias (R)
▌7. Samuel Friedel (D)
▌At-large. Carlton R. Sickles (D)

==== Massachusetts ====
▌1. Silvio O. Conte (R)
▌2. Edward Boland (D)
▌3. Philip J. Philbin (D)
▌4. Harold Donohue (D)
▌5. F. Bradford Morse (R)
▌6. William H. Bates (R)
▌7. Torbert Macdonald (D)
▌8. Tip O'Neill (D)
▌9. John W. McCormack (D)
▌10. Joseph W. Martin Jr. (R)
▌11. James A. Burke (D)
▌12. Hastings Keith (R)

==== Michigan ====
▌1. Lucien Nedzi (D)
▌2. George Meader (R)
▌3. August E. Johansen (R)
▌4. J. Edward Hutchinson (R)
▌5. Gerald Ford (R)
▌6. Charles E. Chamberlain (R)
▌7. James G. O'Hara (D)
▌8. R. James Harvey (R)
▌9. Robert P. Griffin (R)
▌10. Elford Albin Cederberg (R)
▌11. Victor A. Knox (R)
▌12. John B. Bennett (R), until August 9, 1964
▌13. Charles Diggs (D)
▌14. Harold M. Ryan (D)
▌15. John D. Dingell Jr. (D)
▌16. John Lesinski Jr. (D)
▌17. Martha Griffiths (D)
▌18. William Broomfield (R)
▌At-large. Neil Staebler (D)

==== Minnesota ====
▌1. Al Quie (R)
▌2. Ancher Nelsen (R)
▌3. Clark MacGregor (R)
▌4. Joseph Karth (DFL)
▌5. Donald M. Fraser (DFL)
▌6. Alec G. Olson (DFL)
▌7. Odin Langen (R)
▌8. John Blatnik (DFL)

==== Mississippi ====
▌1. Thomas Abernethy (D)
▌2. Jamie Whitten (D)
▌3. John Bell Williams (D)
▌4. W. Arthur Winstead (D)
▌5. William M. Colmer (D)

==== Missouri ====
▌1. Frank M. Karsten (D)
▌2. Thomas B. Curtis (R)
▌3. Leonor Sullivan (D)
▌4. William J. Randall (D)
▌5. Richard Walker Bolling (D)
▌6. William Raleigh Hull Jr. (D)
▌7. Durward Gorham Hall (R)
▌8. Richard Howard Ichord Jr. (D)
▌9. Clarence Cannon (D), until May 12, 1964

▌William L. Hungate (D), from November 3, 1964

▌10. Paul C. Jones (D)

==== Montana ====
▌1. Arnold Olsen (D)
▌2. James F. Battin (R)

==== Nebraska ====
▌1. Ralph F. Beermann (R)
▌2. Glenn Cunningham (R)
▌3. David Martin (R)

==== Nevada ====
▌At-large. Walter S. Baring Jr. (D)

==== New Hampshire ====
▌1. Louis C. Wyman (R)
▌2. James Colgate Cleveland (R)

==== New Jersey ====
▌1. William T. Cahill (R)
▌2. Milton W. Glenn (R)
▌3. James C. Auchincloss (R)
▌4. Frank Thompson (D)
▌5. Peter Frelinghuysen Jr. (R)
▌6. Florence P. Dwyer (R)
▌7. William B. Widnall (R)
▌8. Charles Samuel Joelson (D)
▌9. Frank C. Osmers Jr. (R)
▌10. Peter W. Rodino (D)
▌11. Joseph Minish (D)
▌12. George M. Wallhauser (R)
▌13. Cornelius Gallagher (D)
▌14. Dominick V. Daniels (D)
▌15. Edward J. Patten (D)

==== New Mexico ====
▌At-large. Thomas G. Morris (D)
▌At-large. Joseph Montoya (D), until November 3, 1964

==== New York ====
▌1. Otis G. Pike (D)
▌2. James R. Grover Jr. (R)
▌3. Steven Derounian (R)
▌4. John W. Wydler (R)
▌5. Frank J. Becker (R)
▌6. Seymour Halpern (R)
▌7. Joseph P. Addabbo (D)
▌8. Benjamin Stanley Rosenthal (D)
▌9. James J. Delaney (D)
▌10. Emanuel Celler (D)
▌11. Eugene J. Keogh (D)
▌12. Edna F. Kelly (D)
▌13. Abraham J. Multer (D)
▌14. John J. Rooney (D)
▌15. Hugh Carey (D)
▌16. John M. Murphy (D)
▌17. John Lindsay (R)
▌18. Adam Clayton Powell Jr. (D)
▌19. Leonard Farbstein (D)
▌20. William Fitts Ryan (D)
▌21. James C. Healey (D)
▌22. Jacob H. Gilbert (D)
▌23. Charles A. Buckley (D)
▌24. Paul A. Fino (R)
▌25. Robert R. Barry (R)
▌26. Ogden Reid (R)
▌27. Katharine St. George (R)
▌28. J. Ernest Wharton (R)
▌29. Leo W. O'Brien (D)
▌30. Carleton J. King (R)
▌31. Clarence E. Kilburn (R)
▌32. Alexander Pirnie (R)
▌33. Howard W. Robison (R)
▌34. R. Walter Riehlman (R)
▌35. Samuel S. Stratton (D)
▌36. Frank Horton (R)
▌37. Harold C. Ostertag (R)
▌38. Charles Goodell (R)
▌39. John R. Pillion (R)
▌40. William E. Miller (R)
▌41. Thaddeus J. Dulski (D)

==== North Carolina ====
▌1. Herbert Covington Bonner (D)
▌2. Lawrence H. Fountain (D)
▌3. David N. Henderson (D)
▌4. Harold D. Cooley (D)
▌5. Ralph James Scott (D)
▌6. Horace R. Kornegay (D)
▌7. Alton Lennon (D)
▌8. Charles R. Jonas (R)
▌9. Jim Broyhill (R)
▌10. Basil Lee Whitener (D)
▌11. Roy A. Taylor (D)

==== North Dakota ====
▌1. Hjalmar Carl Nygaard (R), until July 18, 1963

▌Mark Andrews (R), from October 22, 1963

▌2. Don L. Short (R)

==== Ohio ====
▌1. Carl West Rich (R)
▌2. Donald D. Clancy (R)
▌3. Paul F. Schenck (R)
▌4. William Moore McCulloch (R)
▌5. Del Latta (R)
▌6. Bill Harsha (R)
▌7. Clarence J. Brown (R)
▌8. Jackson Edward Betts (R)
▌9. Thomas L. Ashley (D)
▌10. Pete Abele (R)
▌11. Oliver P. Bolton (R)
▌12. Samuel L. Devine (R)
▌13. Charles Adams Mosher (R)
▌14. William Hanes Ayres (R)
▌15. Robert T. Secrest (D)
▌16. Frank T. Bow (R)
▌17. John M. Ashbrook (R)
▌18. Wayne Hays (D)
▌19. Michael J. Kirwan (D)
▌20. Michael A. Feighan (D)
▌21. Charles Vanik (D)
▌22. Frances P. Bolton (R)
▌23. William Edwin Minshall Jr. (R)
▌At-large. Robert Taft Jr. (R)

==== Oklahoma ====
▌1. Page Belcher (R)
▌2. Ed Edmondson (D)
▌3. Carl Albert (D)
▌4. Tom Steed (D)
▌5. John Jarman (D)
▌6. Victor Wickersham (D)

==== Oregon ====
▌1. A. Walter Norblad (R), until September 20, 1964

▌Wendell Wyatt (R), from November 3, 1964

▌2. Al Ullman (D)
▌3. Edith Green (D)
▌4. Robert B. Duncan (D)

==== Pennsylvania ====
▌1. William A. Barrett (D)
▌2. Robert N. C. Nix Sr. (D)
▌3. James A. Byrne (D)
▌4. Herman Toll (D)
▌5. William J. Green Jr. (D), until December 21, 1963

▌William J. Green III (D), from April 28, 1964

▌6. George M. Rhodes (D)
▌7. William H. Milliken Jr. (R)
▌8. Willard S. Curtin (R)
▌9. Paul B. Dague (R)
▌10. Joseph M. McDade (R)
▌11. Dan Flood (D)
▌12. J. Irving Whalley (R)
▌13. Richard Schweiker (R)
▌14. William S. Moorhead (D)
▌15. Francis E. Walter (D), until May 31, 1963

▌Fred B. Rooney (D), from July 30, 1963

▌16. John C. Kunkel (R)
▌17. Herman T. Schneebeli (R)
▌18. Robert J. Corbett (R)
▌19. George Atlee Goodling (R)
▌20. Elmer J. Holland (D)
▌21. John Herman Dent (D)
▌22. John P. Saylor (R)
▌23. Leon H. Gavin (R), until September 15, 1963

▌Albert W. Johnson (R), from November 5, 1963

▌24. James D. Weaver (R)
▌25. Frank M. Clark (D)
▌26. Thomas E. Morgan (D)
▌27. James G. Fulton (R)

==== Rhode Island ====
▌1. Fernand St Germain (D)
▌2. John E. Fogarty (D)

==== South Carolina ====
▌1. L. Mendel Rivers (D)
▌2. Albert Watson (D)
▌3. William Jennings Bryan Dorn (D)
▌4. Robert T. Ashmore (D)
▌5. Robert W. Hemphill (D), until May 1, 1964

▌Thomas S. Gettys (D), from November 3, 1964

▌6. John L. McMillan (D)

==== South Dakota ====
▌1. Ben Reifel (R)
▌2. Ellis Yarnal Berry (R)

==== Tennessee ====
▌1. Jimmy Quillen (R)
▌2. Howard Baker Sr. (R), until January 7, 1964

▌Irene Baker (R), from March 10, 1964

▌3. Bill Brock (R)
▌4. Joe L. Evins (D)
▌5. Richard Fulton (D)
▌6. Ross Bass (D), until November 3, 1964
▌7. Tom J. Murray (D)
▌8. Fats Everett (D)
▌9. Clifford Davis (D)

==== Texas ====
▌1. Wright Patman (D)
▌2. Jack Brooks (D)
▌3. Lindley Beckworth (D)
▌4. Ray Roberts (D)
▌5. Bruce Alger (R)
▌6. Olin E. Teague (D)
▌7. John Dowdy (D)
▌8. Albert Thomas (D)
▌9. Clark W. Thompson (D)
▌10. Homer Thornberry (D), until December 20, 1963

▌J. J. Pickle (D), from December 21, 1963

▌11. William R. Poage (D)
▌12. Jim Wright (D)
▌13. Graham B. Purcell Jr. (D)
▌14. John Andrew Young (D)
▌15. Joe M. Kilgore (D)
▌16. Ed Foreman (R)
▌17. Omar Burleson (D)
▌18. Walter E. Rogers (D)
▌19. George H. Mahon (D)
▌20. Henry B. González (D)
▌21. O. C. Fisher (D)
▌22. Robert R. Casey (D)
▌At-large. Joe R. Pool (D)

==== Utah ====
▌1. Laurence J. Burton (R)
▌2. Sherman P. Lloyd (R)

==== Vermont ====
▌At-large. Robert Stafford (R)

==== Virginia ====
▌1. Thomas N. Downing (D)
▌2. Porter Hardy Jr. (D)
▌3. J. Vaughan Gary (D)
▌4. Watkins Moorman Abbitt (D)
▌5. William M. Tuck (D)
▌6. Richard Harding Poff (R)
▌7. John Otho Marsh Jr. (D)
▌8. Howard W. Smith (D)
▌9. W. Pat Jennings (D)
▌10. Joel Broyhill (R)

==== Washington ====
▌1. Thomas Pelly (R)
▌2. Jack Westland (R)
▌3. Julia Butler Hansen (D)
▌4. Catherine Dean May (R)
▌5. Walt Horan (R)
▌6. Thor C. Tollefson (R)
▌7. K. William Stinson (R)

==== West Virginia ====
▌1. Arch A. Moore Jr. (R)
▌2. Harley Orrin Staggers (D)
▌3. John M. Slack Jr. (D)
▌4. Ken Hechler (D)
▌5. Elizabeth Kee (D)

==== Wisconsin ====
▌1. Henry C. Schadeberg (R)
▌2. Robert Kastenmeier (D)
▌3. Vernon Wallace Thomson (R)
▌4. Clement J. Zablocki (D)
▌5. Henry S. Reuss (D)
▌6. William Van Pelt (R)
▌7. Melvin Laird (R)
▌8. John W. Byrnes (R)
▌9. Lester Johnson (D)
▌10. Alvin O'Konski (R)

==== Wyoming ====
▌At-large. William Henry Harrison III (R)

==== Non-voting members ====
▌Puerto Rico. Antonio Fernós-Isern (Resident Commissioner) (PPD)

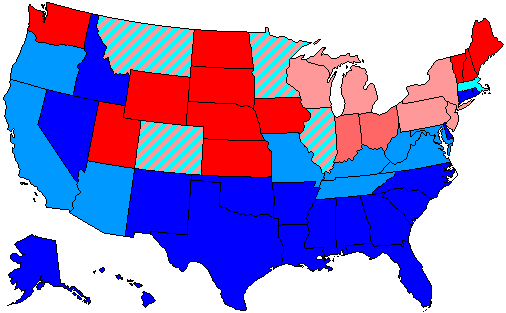
House seats by party holding plurality in state: 80%+ to 100% Democratic / 80%+ to 100% Republican; 60%+ to 80% Democratic / 60%+ to 80% Republican; Up to 60% Democratic / Up to 60% Republican

== Changes in membership ==
=== Senate ===
Senate changes
State (class)	Vacated by	Reason for change	Successor	Date of successor's formal installation (Note: When seated or oath administered, not necessarily when service began.)
Oklahoma (2)	Vacant	Sen. Robert S. Kerr died in previous congress. Successor appointed to continue the term.	J. Howard Edmondson (D)	January 7, 1963
Wisconsin (3)	Vacant	Delayed taking oath of office in order to finish term as Governor of Wisconsin	Gaylord Nelson (D)	January 8, 1963
Tennessee (2)	Estes Kefauver (D)	Died August 10, 1963. Successor appointed August 20, 1963, to continue the term.	Herbert S. Walters (D)	August 20, 1963
California (1)	Clair Engle (D)	Died July 30, 1964. Successor appointed August 4, 1964.	Pierre Salinger (D)	August 4, 1964
South Carolina (2)	Strom Thurmond (D)	Changed political parties.	Strom Thurmond (R)	September 16, 1964
New Mexico (1)	Edwin L. Mechem (R)	Lost special election. Successor elected November 3, 1964.	Joseph Montoya (D)	November 4, 1964
Oklahoma (2)	J. Howard Edmondson (D)	Successor elected November 3, 1964.	Fred R. Harris (D)	November 4, 1964
Tennessee (2)	Herbert S. Walters (D)	Successor elected November 3, 1964.	Ross Bass (D)	November 4, 1964
Minnesota (2)	Hubert Humphrey (DFL)	Resigned December 29, 1964, after being elected Vice President of the United States. Successor appointed December 30, 1964, to finish the term.	Walter Mondale (DFL)	December 30, 1964
California (1)	Pierre Salinger (D)	Resigned December 31, 1964, to give successor preferential seniority. Successor appointed January 1, 1965.	George Murphy (R)	January 1, 1965

=== House of Representatives ===
House changes
District	Vacated by	Reason for change	Successor	Date of successor's formal installation
California 1st	Vacant	Rep. Clement Woodnutt Miller died during previous congress	Donald H. Clausen (R)	January 22, 1963
California 23rd	Clyde Doyle (D)	Died March 14, 1963	Del M. Clawson (R)	June 11, 1963
Pennsylvania 15th	Francis E. Walter (D)	Died May 31, 1963	Fred B. Rooney (D)	July 30, 1963
North Dakota 1st	Hjalmar Carl Nygaard (R)	Died July 18, 1963	Mark Andrews (R)	October 22, 1963
Pennsylvania 23rd	Leon H. Gavin (R)	Died September 15, 1963	Albert W. Johnson (R)	November 3, 1963
Texas 10th	Homer Thornberry (D)	Resigned December 20, 1963, after being appointed as a judge of the United States District Court for the Western District of Texas	J. J. Pickle (D)	December 21, 1963
Pennsylvania 5th	William J. Green Jr. (D)	Died December 21, 1963	William J. Green III (D)	April 28, 1964
California 5th	John F. Shelley (D)	Resigned January 7, 1964, after being elected Mayor of San Francisco	Phillip Burton (D)	February 18, 1964
Tennessee 2nd	Howard Baker Sr. (R)	Died January 7, 1964	Irene Baker (R)	March 10, 1964
Illinois 6th	Thomas J. O'Brien (D)	Died April 14, 1964	Vacant	Not filled this term
South Carolina 5th	Robert W. Hemphill (D)	Resigned May 1, 1964, after being appointed judge of the US District Court for the Eastern and Western Districts of SC	Thomas S. Gettys (D)	November 3, 1964
Missouri 9th	Clarence Cannon (D)	Died May 12, 1964	William L. Hungate (D)	November 3, 1964
Michigan 12th	John B. Bennett (R)	Died August 9, 1964	Vacant	Not filled this term
Oregon 1st	A. Walter Norblad (R)	Died September 20, 1964	Wendell Wyatt (R)	November 3, 1964
New Mexico at-large	Joseph Montoya (D)	Resigned November 3, 1964, after being elected to the US Senate	Vacant	Not filled this term
Tennessee 6th	Ross Bass (D)	Resigned November 3, 1964, after being elected to the US Senate	Vacant	Not filled this term
Illinois 9th	Edward Rowan Finnegan (D)	Resigned December 6, 1964, after being appointed judge for the Circuit Court of Cook County	Vacant	Not filled this term

== Committees ==
Lists of committees and their party leaders for members of the House and Senate committees can be found through the Official Congressional Directory at the bottom of this article. The directory after the pages of terms of service lists committees of the Senate, House (Standing with Subcommittees, Select and Special) and Joint and, after that, House/Senate committee assignments. On the committees section of the House and Senate in the Official Congressional Directory, the committee's members on the first row on the left side shows the chairman of the committee and on the right side shows the ranking member of the committee.

=== Senate ===
- Aeronautical and Space Sciences (Chairman: Clinton P. Anderson; Ranking Member: Margaret Chase Smith)
- Agriculture and Forestry (Chairman: Allen J. Ellender; Ranking Member: George D. Aiken)
- Appropriations (Chairman: Carl Hayden; Ranking Member: Leverett Saltonstall)
- Armed Services (Chairman: Richard B. Russell; Ranking Member: Leverett Saltonstall)
- Banking and Currency (Chairman: A. Willis Robertson; Ranking Member: Wallace F. Bennett)
- Commerce (Chairman: Warren G. Magnuson; Ranking Member: Norris Cotton)
- District of Columbia (Chairman: Alan Bible; Ranking Member: J. Glenn Beall)
- Finance (Chairman: Harry F. Byrd; Ranking Member: John J. Williams)
- Foreign Relations (Chairman: J. William Fulbright; Ranking Member: Bourke B. Hickenlooper)
- Government Operations (Chairman: John Little McClellan; Ranking Member: Karl E. Mundt)
- Interior and Insular Affairs (Chairman: Henry M. Jackson; Ranking Member: Thomas H. Kuchel)
- Judiciary (Chairman: James O. Eastland; Ranking Member: Everett Dirksen)
- Labor and Public Welfare (Chairman: J. Lister Hill; Ranking Member: Barry Goldwater)
- Post Office and Civil Service (Chairman: Olin D. Johnston; Ranking Member: Frank Carlson)
- Public Works (Chairman: Pat McNamara; Ranking Member: John Sherman Cooper)
- Rules and Administration (Chairman: B. Everett Jordan; Ranking Member: Carl T. Curtis)
- Small Business (Select) (Chairman: John J. Sparkman)
- Standards and Conduct (Select) (Chairman: [data missing])
- Whole

=== House of Representatives ===
- Agriculture (Chairman: Harold D. Cooley; Ranking Member: Charles B. Hoeven)
- Appropriations (Chairman: Clarence Cannon; Ranking Member: Ben F. Jensen)
- Armed Services (Chairman: Carl Vinson; Ranking Member: Leslie C. Arends)
- Banking and Currency (Chairman: Wright Patman; Ranking Member: Clarence E. Kilburn)
- District of Columbia (Chairman: John L. McMillan; Ranking Member: Joel T. Broyhill)
- Education and Labor (Chairman: Adam Clayton Powell; Ranking Member: Peter Frelinghuysen)
- Foreign Affairs (Chairman: Thomas E. Morgan; Ranking Member: Frances P. Bolton)
- Government Research (Select) (Chair: Carl Elliott)
- Government Operations (Chairman: William L. Dawson; Ranking Member: R. Walter Riehlman)
- House Administration (Chairman: Omar Burleson; Ranking Member: Paul F. Schenck)
- Interior and Insular Affairs (Chairman: Wayne N. Aspinall; Ranking Member: John P. Saylor)
- Interstate and Foreign Commerce (Chairman: Oren Harris; Ranking Member: John B. Bennett)
- Judiciary (Chairman: Emanuel Celler; Ranking Member: William M. McCulloch)
- Merchant Marine and Fisheries (Chairman: Herbert C. Bonner; Ranking Member: Thor C. Tollefson)
- Post Office and Civil Service (Chairman: Tom J. Murray; Ranking Member: Robert J. Corbett)
- Public Works (Chairman: Charles A. Buckley; Ranking Member: James C. Auchincloss)
- Rules (Chairman: Howard W. Smith; Ranking Member: Clarence J. Brown)
- Science and Astronautics (Chairman: George Paul Miller; Ranking Member: Joseph W. Martin Jr.)
- Small Business (Select) (Chairman: Joe L. Evins)
- Standards of Official Conduct
- Un-American Activities (Chairman: Francis E. Walter; Ranking Member: August E. Johansen)
- Veterans' Affairs (Chairman: Olin E. Teague; Ranking Member: William H. Ayres)
- Ways and Means (Chairman: Wilbur D. Mills; Ranking Member: John W. Byrnes)
- Whole

=== Joint committees ===
- Atomic Energy (Chairman: Sen. John O. Pastore; Vice Chairman: Rep. Chester E. Holifield)
- Conditions of Indian Tribes (Special)
- Construction of a Building for a Museum of History and Technology for the Smithsonian
- Defense Production (Chairman: Rep. Wright Patman; Vice Chairman: Sen. A. Willis Robertson)
- Disposition of Executive Papers
- Economic (Chairman: Sen. Paul H. Douglas; Vice Chairman: Rep. Richard Walker Bolling)
- Immigration and Nationality Policy (Chairman: Vacant; Vice Chairman: Vacant)
- Legislative Budget
- The Library (Chairman: Rep. Omar Burleson; Vice Chairman: Sen. B. Everett Jordan)
- Navajo-Hopi Indian Administration
- Printing (Chairman: Sen. Carl Hayden; Vice Chairman: Rep. Omar Burleson)
- Reduction of Nonessential Federal Expenditures (Chairman: Sen. Harry F. Byrd; Vice Chairman: Rep. Clarence Cannon)
- Taxation (Chairman: Rep. Wilbur D. Mills; Vice Chairman: Sen. Harry F. Byrd)

== Employees ==
=== Legislative branch agency directors ===
- Architect of the Capitol: J. George Stewart
- Attending Physician of the United States Congress: George Calver
- Comptroller General of the United States: Joseph Campbell
- Librarian of Congress: Lawrence Quincy Mumford
- Public Printer of the United States: James L. Harrison

=== Senate ===
- Chaplain: Frederick Brown Harris, Methodist
- Parliamentarian: Charles Watkins, until 1964
  - Floyd Riddick, from 1964
- Secretary: Felton McLellan Johnston
- Librarian: Richard D. Hupman
- Secretary for the Majority: Robert G. Baker, until 1963
  - Francis R. Valeo, from 1963
- Secretary for the Minority: J. Mark Trice
- Sergeant at Arms: Joseph C. Duke

=== House of Representatives ===
- Clerk: Ralph R. Roberts
- Doorkeeper: William Mosley "Fishbait" Miller
- Parliamentarian: Lewis Deschler
- Postmaster: H. H. Morris
- Reading Clerks: George J. Maurer (D) and Joe Bartlett (R)
- Sergeant at Arms: Zeake W. Johnson Jr.
- Chaplain: Bernard Braskamp - Presbyterian

== See also ==
- 1962 United States elections (elections leading to this Congress)
  - 1962 United States Senate elections
  - 1962 United States House of Representatives elections
- 1964 United States elections (elections during this Congress, leading to the next Congress)
  - 1964 United States presidential election
  - 1964 United States Senate elections
  - 1964 United States House of Representatives elections
