= 1966 United States Senate election in Tennessee =

- November 8, 1966
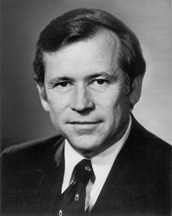

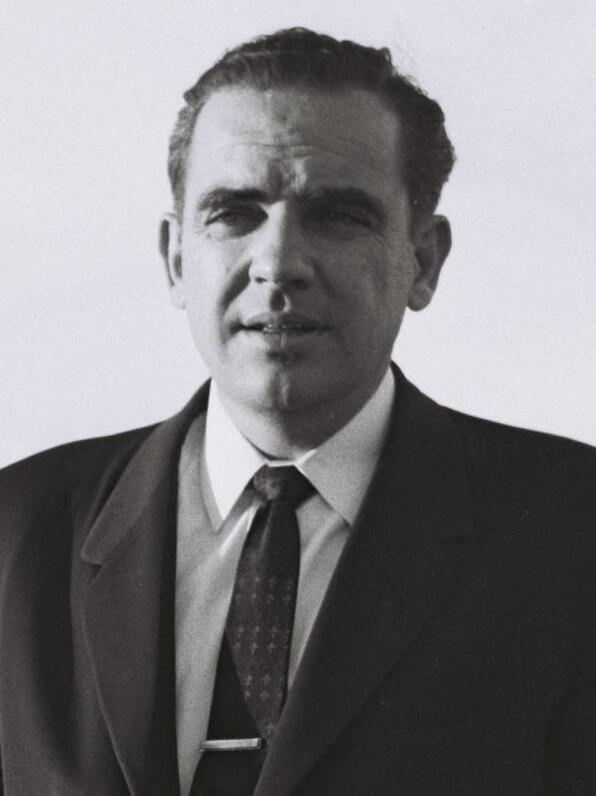
Nominee	Howard Baker	Frank G. Clement
Party	Republican	Democratic
Popular vote	483,063	383,843
Percentage	55.72%	44.27%
- County results Baker: 50–60% 60–70% 70–80% 80–90% Clement: 50–60% 60–70% 70–80%
Senator before election
Ross Bass
Democratic
Elected Senator
Howard Baker
Republican

The 1966 United States Senate election in Tennessee was held on November 8, 1966, concurrently with other elections to the United States Senate in other states as well as elections to the United States House of Representatives and various state and local elections. Republican nominee Howard Baker won the election, defeating Democratic nominee and Tennessee Governor Frank G. Clement with 55.7% of the vote.

In the primary, incumbent Democratic Senator Ross Bass lost to Governor Clement by a little over 2%.

Baker became the first Republican to represent Tennessee since the temporary appointment of Newell Sanders in 1912. He was the first Tennessee Republican to win a full term in the Senate since Reconstruction in 1867 and the first ever to win a popular election to the Senate. He was also the first Republican to win a full term to this Senate seat.

== Republican primary ==
=== Candidates ===
- Howard Baker, Republican nominee in the 1964 United States Senate special election in Tennessee
- Kenneth Roberts

6.5% of the voting age population participated in the Republican primary.

=== Results ===
Republican Party primary results
Party	Candidate	Votes	%
Republican	Howard Baker	112,617	75.74%
Republican	Kenneth Roberts	36,043	24.24%

== Democratic primary ==
=== Candidates ===
- Frank G. Clement, Governor of Tennessee and candidate for the United States Senate in 1964.
- Ross Bass, incumbent U.S. Senator

32.9% of the voting age population participated in the Democratic primary.

=== Results ===
Democratic Party primary results
Party	Candidate	Votes	%
Democratic	Frank G. Clement	384,322	51.22%
Democratic	Ross Bass (incumbent)	366,079	48.78%

== General election ==
=== Results ===
General election
Party	Candidate	Votes	%
Republican	Howard Baker	483,063	55.72%
Democratic	Frank G. Clement	383,843	44.27%
None	Write-Ins	55	0.01%
Majority		99,220	10.45%
Turnout		866,961	
Republican gain from Democratic			

== See also ==
- 1966 United States Senate elections
- 1966 Tennessee gubernatorial election

== Works cited ==
- Steed, Robert; Moreland, Laurence; Baker, Tod, eds. (1980). Party Politics in the South. Praeger Publishers. ISBN 0030565863.
