= 1964 United States Senate special election in Tennessee =

- November 3, 1964
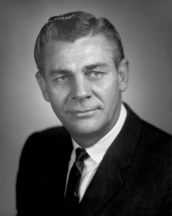

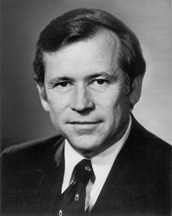
Nominee	Ross Bass	Howard Baker
Party	Democratic	Republican
Popular vote	568,905	517,330
Percentage	52.14%	47.41%
- County results Bass: 50–60% 60–70% 70–80% 80–90% Baker: 50–60% 60–70% 70–80% 80–90%
U.S. senator before election
Herbert S. Walters
Democratic
Elected U.S. senator
Ross Bass
Democratic

The 1964 United States Senate special election in Tennessee was held on November 3, 1964, concurrently with the U.S. presidential election as well the other regularly scheduled U.S. Senate election, as well as other elections to the United States Senate in other states as well as elections to the United States House of Representatives and various state and local elections. Following the death of Senator Estes Kefauver, Governor Frank G. Clement appointed Herbert S. Walters to fill the vacancy until the special election could take place. Walters decided not to run in the special election. Democratic nominee Ross Bass won the election, defeating Republican Howard Baker with 52.1% of the vote.

In the primary, Bass defeated Governor Clement by almost 15 points.

== Democratic primary ==
=== Candidates ===
- Ross Bass, U.S. Representative from Pulaski
- Frank G. Clement, Governor of Tennessee
- M. M. Bullard

29.4% of the voting age population participated in the Democratic primary.

=== Results ===
Democratic Party primary results
Party	Candidate	Votes	%
Democratic	Ross Bass	330,213	50.79%
Democratic	Frank G. Clement	233,245	35.87%
Democratic	M. M. Bullard	86,718	13.34%

== Republican primary ==
=== Candidates ===
- Howard Baker
- Charlie Moffett
- Hubert David Patty

5% of the voting age population participated in the Republican primary.

=== Results ===
Republican Party primary results
Party	Candidate	Votes	%
Republican	Howard Baker	93,301	84.94%
Republican	Charlie Moffett	10,596	9.65%
Republican	Hubert David Patty	5,947	5.41%

== General election ==
General election results
Party	Candidate	Votes	%
Democratic	Ross Bass	568,905	52.14%
Republican	Howard Baker	517,330	47.41%
Independent	Melvin Babcock Morgan	4,853	0.44%
Majority		51,575	4.73%
Turnout		1,091,088	
Democratic hold			

== See also ==
- 1964 United States Senate elections

== Works cited ==
- Steed, Robert; Moreland, Laurence; Baker, Tod, eds. (1980). Party Politics in the South. Praeger Publishers. ISBN 0030565863.
