= Buford Ellington =

Tennessee politician (1907–1972)

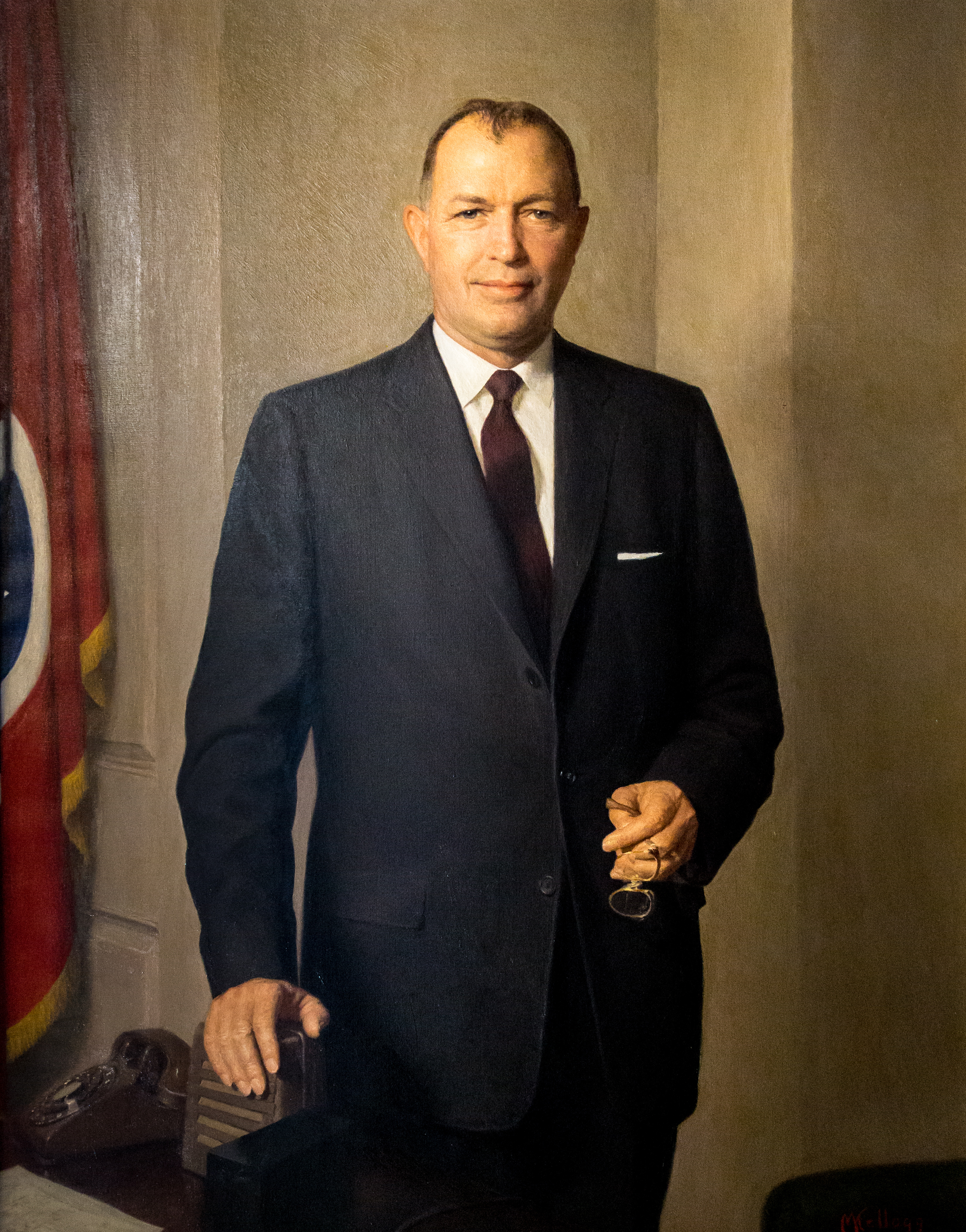

Chair of the National Governors Association
- In office July 21, 1968 – August 31, 1969
- Preceded by: John Volpe
- Succeeded by: John Arthur Love

42nd Governor of Tennessee
- In office January 16, 1967 – January 16, 1971
- Lieutenant: Frank Gorrell
- Preceded by: Frank G. Clement
- Succeeded by: Winfield Dunn
- In office January 19, 1959 – January 15, 1963
- Lieutenant: William D. Baird
- Preceded by: Frank G. Clement
- Succeeded by: Frank G. Clement

Director of the Office of Emergency Planning
- In office March 4, 1965 – March 23, 1966
- President: Lyndon B. Johnson
- Preceded by: Edward McDermott
- Succeeded by: C. Farris Bryant

Personal details
- Born: Earl Buford Ellington; June 27, 1907 Holmes County, Mississippi, U.S.
- Died: April 3, 1972 (aged 64) Boca Raton, Florida, U.S.
- Party: Democratic
- Spouse: Catherine Cheek
- Education: Holmes Community College (attended); Millsaps College (attended)

Earl Buford Ellington (June 27, 1907 – April 3, 1972) was an American politician who served as the 42nd governor of Tennessee from 1959 to 1963, and again from 1967 to 1971. Along with his political ally, Frank G. Clement, he helped lead a political machine that controlled the governor's office for 18 years, from 1953 to 1971.

Ellington was a supporter of President Lyndon B. Johnson; he was appointed in 1965 as the Director of the Office of Emergency Planning during the Johnson Administration.

== Early life and career ==
Ellington was born in Holmes County, Mississippi, the son of Abner and Cora (Grantham) Ellington. He studied religion at Millsaps College in Jackson, Mississippi, but had to drop out due to financial difficulties. He edited a newspaper in Durant, Mississippi, for a brief period.

In 1929, he married Catherine Ann Cheek, and moved to her native Marshall County, Tennessee, in the south central part of the state. There he bought a store in the Verona community. He worked as a salesman for American Harvester in the 1930s, and was a supervising salesman with Tennessee Farm Bureau Insurance in the early 1940s.

Having joined the Democratic Party, in 1944, Ellington worked in the campaign of successful gubernatorial candidate, Jim Nance McCord. Two years later, he was the Marshall County manager for the campaign of US Congressman Joe L. Evins. In 1948, Ellington ran and was elected to Marshall County's seat in the Tennessee House of Representatives.

In 1952, Ellington managed the successful campaign of Frank Clement, who defeated incumbent Gordon Browning in the Democratic primary for governor, and went on to win the general election. Clement's campaign had the support of Memphis political boss E. H. Crump, who was seeking to regain the influence he had lost after Browning defeated his candidate, McCord, four years earlier. Clement appointed Ellington as Commissioner of Agriculture, where he served until the late 1950s under more than one administration.

== Governor of Tennessee ==
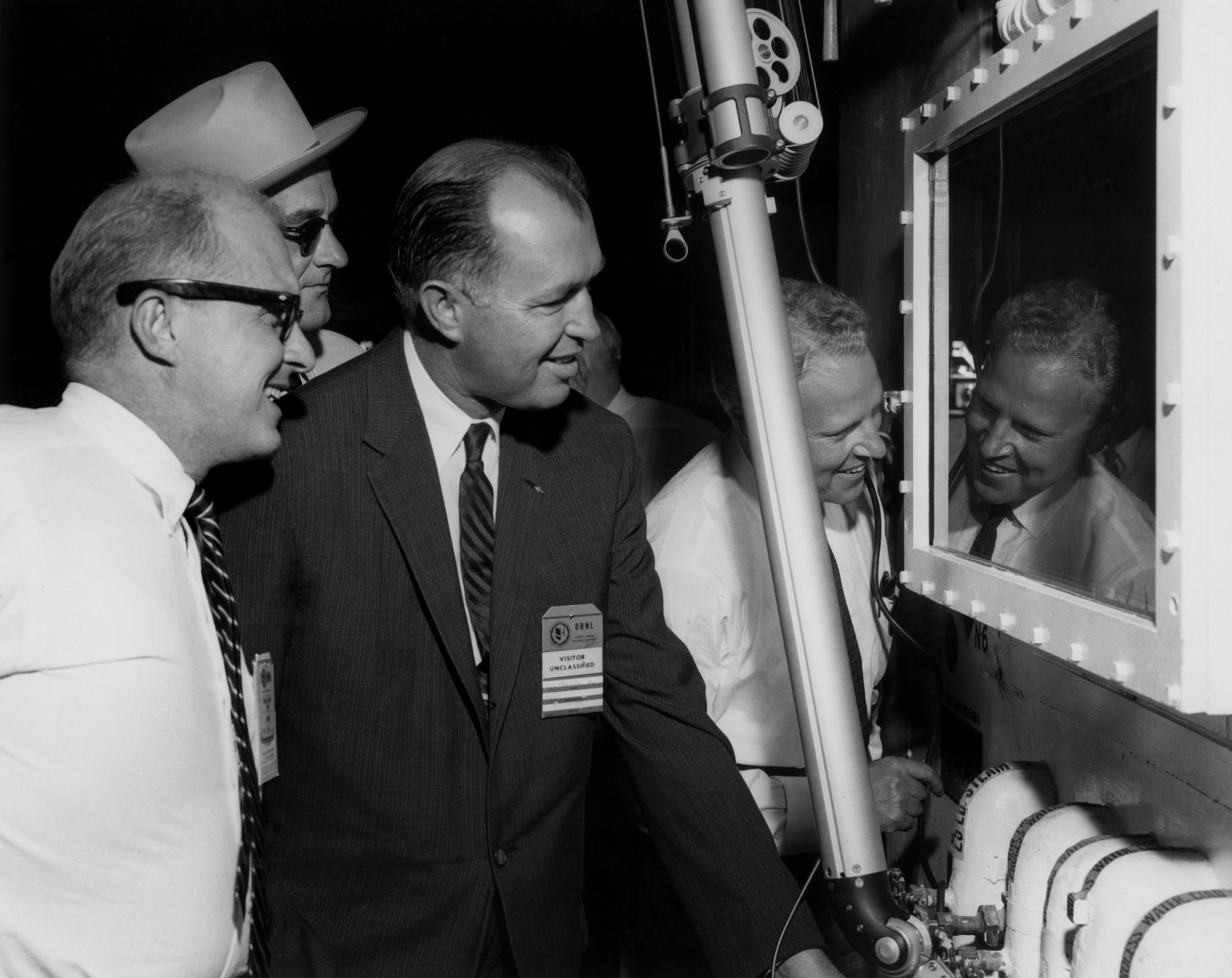
Ellington (center), photographed by Ed Westcott at the Oak Ridge National Laboratory in 1958

In 1953, the Tennessee State Constitution was amended, extending the gubernatorial term from two years to four years. The new amendments prevented governors from serving consecutive terms, but a temporary exception was made for Clement. He was elected to a full four-year term in 1954 after his initial two-year term.

In 1958, with Clement term-limited, Ellington sought the Democratic Party's nomination for governor. His opponents were Memphis mayor Edmund Orgill, Nashville attorney Clifford Allen, and Judge Andrew "Tip" Taylor. Since Crump's death in 1954, the Clement-Ellington alliance had become the state's leading political organization. Ellington won the nomination with 213,415 votes to 204,629 for Taylor, 204,382 for Orgill, and 56,854 for Allen. He won the general election by a sizeable margin over several opponents, among them former Governor McCord, who ran as an independent.

During his first term, Ellington continued many of Clement's policies. Aided by an economic boom, he could approve raises for public school teachers and school administrators without increasing taxes. While he supported continued legal segregation, he ordered the state to comply with the U.S. Supreme Court's decision in Brown v. Board of Education (1954) that ruled that segregation in public schools was unconstitutional; it ordered desegregation of the public school system.

In 1961, several Tennessee State University students who had participated in the Freedom Rides, to highlight illegal segregation on interstates buses, which were covered by federal law, were expelled after Ellington ordered an investigation into their activities. In response, dozens of protesters picketed the state capitol and demanded a meeting with Ellington, but he refused.

At the 1960 Democratic National Convention, a rift had begun to form in the relationship between Clement and Ellington. The former endorsed John F. Kennedy for president, and the latter endorsed Lyndon B. Johnson.

Following his first term as governor, which ended in 1963, Ellington returned to the private sector, working as a vice president of the Louisville and Nashville Railroad. Vice President Lyndon Johnson succeeded Kennedy to the presidency after he was assassinated in Dallas in November 1963.

In early 1965, President Johnson appointed Ellington as Director of the Office of Emergency Planning (later integrated into FEMA). During the Selma to Montgomery marches, which took place at the height of the civil rights movement in March of that year, Ellington played a key role in establishing contact and talks between President Johnson and Governor George Wallace of Alabama. The state provided protection for marchers in the last march. In September, Ellington helped organize federal relief efforts in the wake of Hurricane Betsy.

Ellington again sought the Democratic Party nomination for governor in 1966. His opponent, John Jay Hooker, was a friend of former Governor Browning, and had been endorsed by the Nashville Tennessean. Ellington was endorsed by President Johnson, Clement, and the Nashville Banner. He defeated Hooker for the nomination, 413,950 votes to 360,105. The divide between Clement and Ellington continued to grow, as Ellington refused to endorse Clement in his US Senate primary campaign against Ross Bass. Governor Clement attempted to spend the state's budget surplus to ensure the Ellington administration did not inherit it.

Ellington won the general gubernatorial election in 1966. By this time, he had shifted his position on segregation, and openly supported an end to the long-standing practice. In 1967, he appointed African American Hosea T. Lockard to his cabinet as administrative assistant; he was the first black cabinet member in state history. On April 4, 1968, the assassination of Martin Luther King Jr. in Memphis led Ellington to immediately mobilize the National Guard, to prevent rioting in the city.

In September 1967, Ellington signed a bill repealing the Butler Act, the 1925 law that had outlawed the teaching of the Theory of Evolution in state schools.

== Later life ==
Ellington did not seek another office after his second term as governor ended. In the 1970 gubernatorial campaign, he refused to endorse the Democratic nominee, John Jay Hooker, and quietly supported the Republican nominee (and eventual winner), Winfield Dunn. Ellington's press secretary, Hudley Crockett, was narrowly defeated by incumbent Albert Gore Sr., in the 1970 U.S. Senate primary.

Ellington died while playing golf in Boca Raton, Florida, on April 3, 1972. Former President Johnson and Vice President Spiro Agnew were among those who attended his funeral, and President Richard Nixon issued a statement of condolence.

== Family and legacy ==
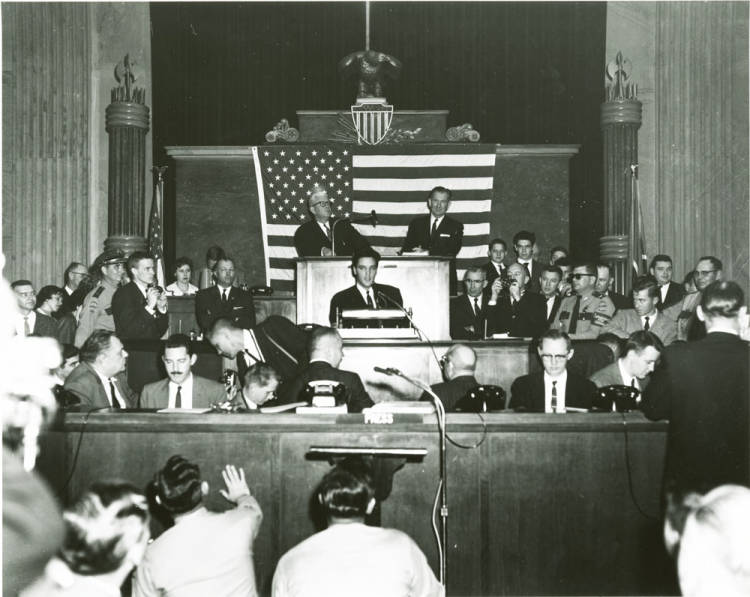
Elvis Presley and Gov. Buford Ellington at a joint convention of the Tennessee General Assembly.

Ellington married Catherine Ann Cheek in 1929. They had two children: John, who became a pilot and aviation expert, and Ann, who became an artist. Ellington began a friendship with Elvis Presley, who was honored by the Tennessee General Assembly with the title of "Honorary Colonel" on March 8, 1961.

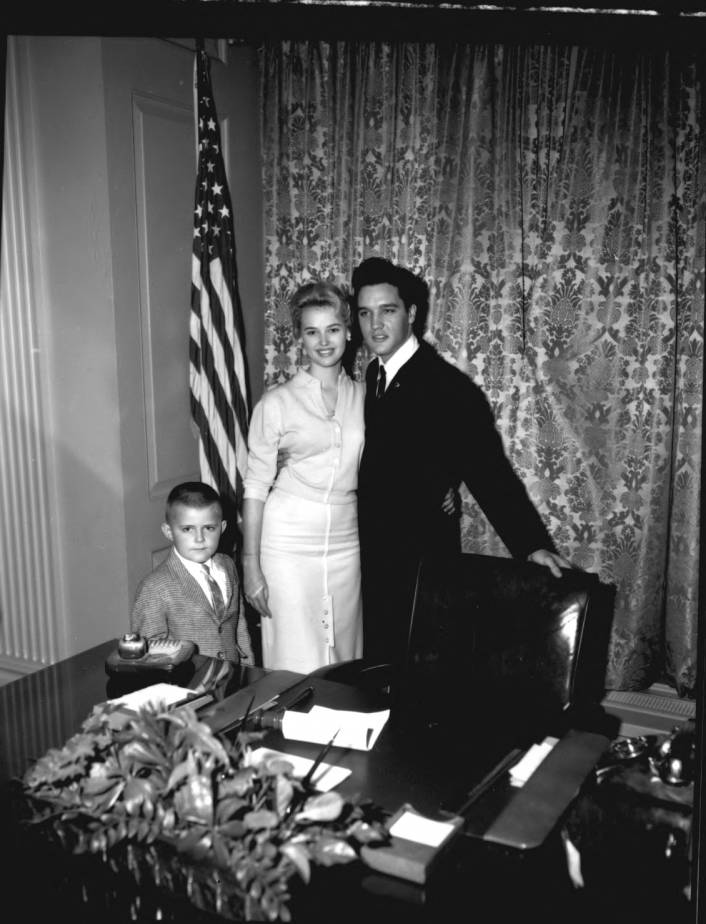
Elvis Presley visiting the Tennessee State Capitol, Nashville, Tennessee. He is pictured with Governor Buford Ellington's daughter, Ann (later Ann Ellington Wagner), and an unidentified young boy.

During his meeting with the Governor, Elvis met Ellington's teenage daughter Ann Ellington (now Ann Ellington Wagner). The two developed a friendship and Elvis would frequently visit with Ann while in Nashville to record.

While the exact beginnings of Elvis' friendship with Governor Ellington and his daughter are difficult to determine, Ann has stated that she believes Elvis and her father first connected through Elvis' charitable work. Elvis was recognized by the city of Memphis in February 1961 for his work supporting local charities, and according to Ellington Wagner, he would write a check to Governor Ellington every Christmas for donations to orphanages and to provide gifts to children. Ann has speculated that Elvis and her father's friendship continued to grow due to their shared Mississippi heritage and similar upbringings.

- The Ellington Agricultural Center, the headquarters of the Tennessee Department of Agriculture, is named in honor of Governor Ellington.
- A golf course at Henry Horton State Park and buildings on the campuses of Tennessee Technological University, the University of Memphis, and the University of Tennessee at Martin were also named in his honor.
- The Financial Aid and Registrar building on the campus of Austin Peay State University is named in Ellington's honor.

== See also ==
- List of governors of Tennessee

Party political offices
Preceded by Frank G. Clement	Democratic nominee for Governor of Tennessee; 1958	Succeeded by Frank G. Clement
Preceded by Frank G. Clement	Democratic nominee for Governor of Tennessee; 1966	Succeeded by John Jay Hooker
Political offices
Preceded by Frank G. Clement	Governor of Tennessee; 1959–1963	Succeeded by Frank G. Clement
Preceded by Edward McDermott	Director of the Office of Emergency Planning; 1965–1966	Succeeded by C. Farris Bryant
Preceded by Frank G. Clement	Governor of Tennessee; 1967–1971	Succeeded by Winfield Dunn
Preceded by John A. Volpe	Chair of the National Governors Association; 1968–1969	Succeeded by John Arthur Love
