= 1954 Tennessee gubernatorial election =

- November 2, 1954
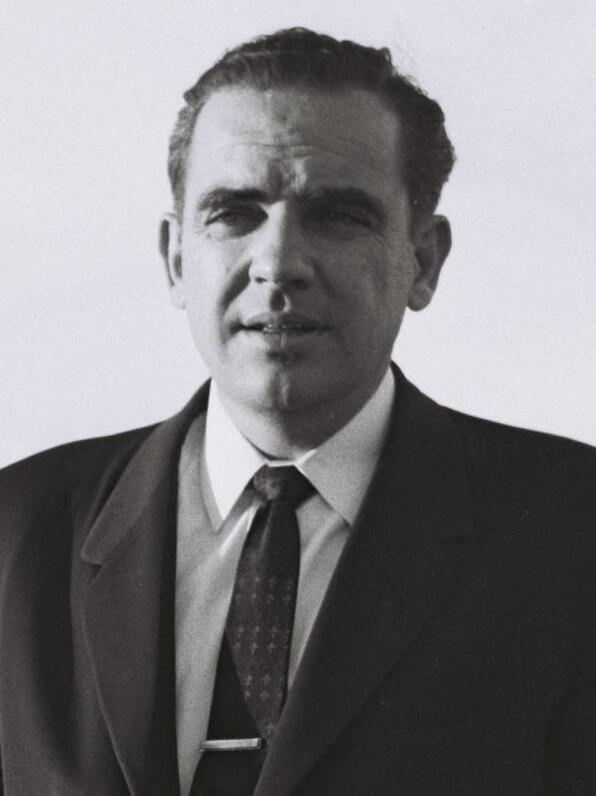

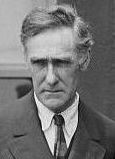
Nominee	Frank G. Clement	John Randolph Neal Jr.
Party	Democratic	Independent
Popular vote	281,291	39,574
Percentage	87.20%	12.27%
- County results Clement: 60–70% 70–80% 80–90% >90%
Governor before election
Frank G. Clement
Democratic
Elected Governor
Frank G. Clement
Democratic

The 1954 Tennessee gubernatorial election was held on November 2, 1954, to elect the next governor of Tennessee. Incumbent Democratic governor Frank G. Clement defeated Independent candidate John Randolph Neal Jr. with 87.2% of the vote.

In 1953, the Tennessee State Constitution was amended, extending the gubernatorial term from two years to four years. The new amendments prevented governors from serving consecutive terms, but a temporary exception was made for Clement. He was elected to a full four-year term after his initial two-year term.

== Primary elections ==
Primary elections were held on August 5, 1954.

=== Democratic primary ===
==== Candidates ====
- Frank G. Clement, incumbent governor
- Gordon Browning, former governor
- Raulston Schoolfield

==== Results ====
Democratic primary results
Party	Candidate	Votes	%
Democratic	Frank G. Clement (incumbent)	481,808	68.17%
Democratic	Gordon Browning	195,156	27.61%
Democratic	Raulston Schoolfield	29,866	4.23%
Total votes		706,830	100.00%

== General election ==
=== Candidates ===
Major party candidates

- Frank G. Clement, Democratic
- W.E. Michel, Republican

Other candidates

- John Randolph Neal Jr., Independent

=== Results ===
1954 Tennessee gubernatorial election
Party	Candidate	Votes	%	±%
Democratic	Frank G. Clement (incumbent)	281,291	87.20%	
Independent	John Randolph Neal Jr.	39,574	12.27%	
Republican	W. E. Michel	1,705	0.53%	
		16	0.01%	
Majority		281,291		
Turnout		322,586		
Democratic hold		Swing		
