= Howard Baker =

American politician and diplomat (1925–2014)

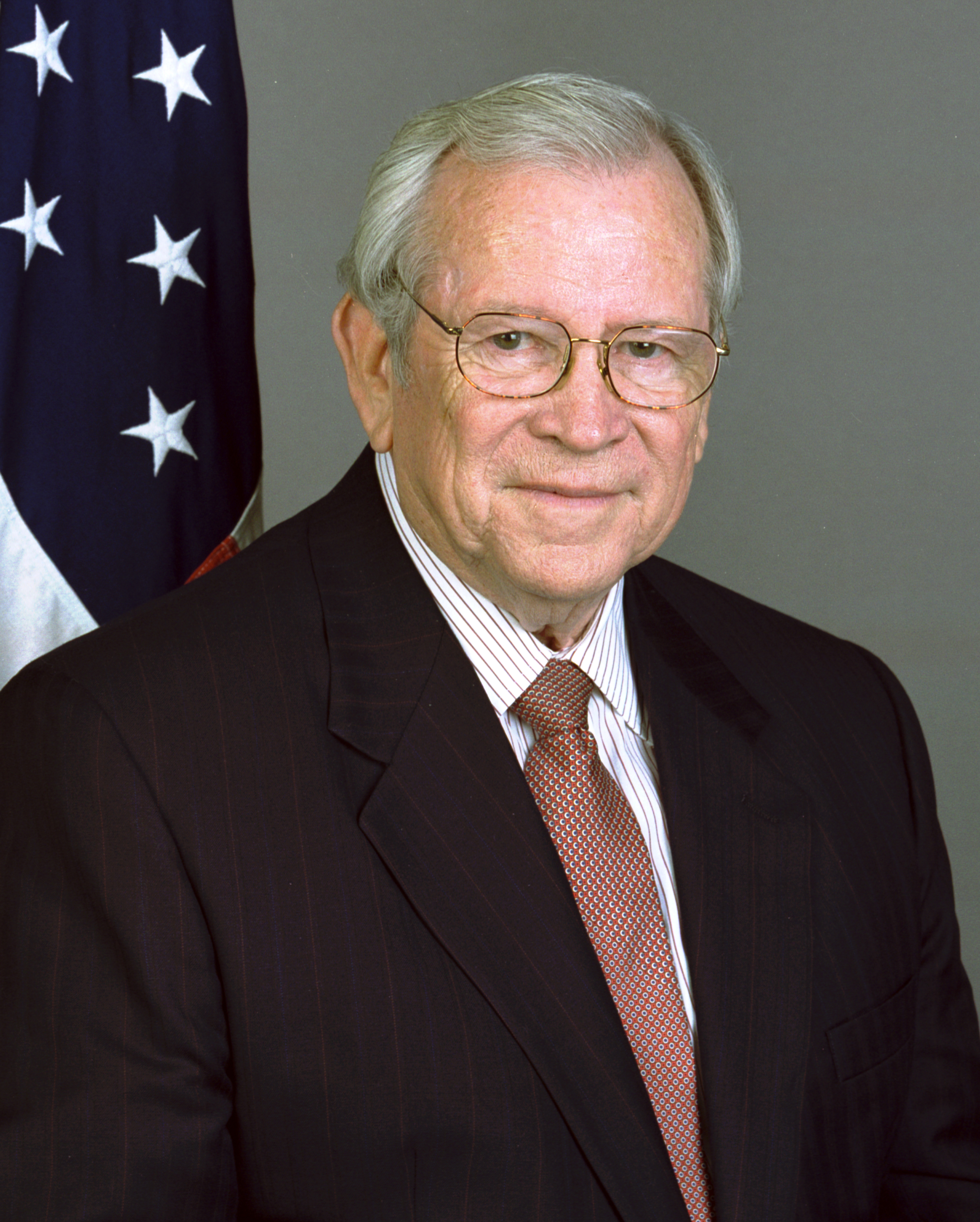
- Official portrait, 2001

26th United States Ambassador to Japan
- In office July 5, 2001 – February 17, 2005
- President: George W. Bush
- Preceded by: Tom Foley
- Succeeded by: Tom Schieffer

12th White House Chief of Staff
- In office February 27, 1987 – July 3, 1988
- President: Ronald Reagan
- Deputy: Kenneth Duberstein
- Preceded by: Donald Regan
- Succeeded by: Kenneth Duberstein

United States Senator from Tennessee
- In office January 3, 1967 – January 3, 1985
- Preceded by: Ross Bass
- Succeeded by: Al Gore
Senate positions
Senate Majority Leader
In office January 3, 1981 – January 3, 1985
Whip	Ted Stevens
Preceded by	Robert Byrd
Succeeded by	Bob Dole
Senate Minority Leader
In office March 5, 1980 – January 3, 1981
Whip	Ted Stevens
Preceded by	Ted Stevens (acting)
Succeeded by	Robert Byrd
In office January 3, 1977 – November 1, 1979
Whip	Ted Stevens
Preceded by	Hugh Scott
Succeeded by	Ted Stevens (acting)
Leader of the Senate Republican Conference
In office January 3, 1977 – November 1, 1979
Deputy	Ted Stevens
Preceded by	Hugh Scott
Succeeded by	Ted Stevens
In office March 5, 1980 – January 3, 1985
Deputy	Ted Stevens
Preceded by	Ted Stevens
Succeeded by	Bob Dole

Personal details
- Born: Howard Henry Baker Jr. November 15, 1925 Huntsville, Tennessee, U.S.
- Died: June 26, 2014 (aged 88) Huntsville, Tennessee, U.S.
- Party: Republican
- Spouses: Danice Joy Dirksen (m. 1951; died 1993) Nancy Kassebaum (m. 1996)
- Children: 2
- Parents: Howard Baker Sr. (father); Dora Ladd (mother)
- Education: Tulane University; University of the South; University of Tennessee (LLB)

Military service
- Allegiance: United States
- Branch/service: United States Navy
- Years of service: 1943–1946
- Battles/wars: World War II
- Baker's voice Baker explains the benefits of televising Senate proceedings at a Senate Rules Committee hearing Recorded April 8, 1981

Howard Henry Baker Jr. (November 15, 1925 – June 26, 2014) was an American politician, diplomat and photographer who served as a United States senator from Tennessee from 1967 to 1985. During his tenure, he rose to the rank of Senate minority leader and then Senate majority leader. A member of the Republican Party, Baker was the first Republican to be elected to the U.S. Senate in Tennessee since the Reconstruction era.

Known in Washington, D.C., as the "Great Conciliator", Baker was often regarded as one of the most successful senators in terms of brokering compromises, enacting legislation, and maintaining civility. For example, he had a lead role in the fashioning and passing of the Clean Air Act of 1970 with Democratic senator Edmund Muskie. A moderate conservative, he was also respected by his Democratic colleagues.

Baker sought the Republican presidential nomination in 1980 but dropped out after the first set of primaries. From 1987 to 1988, he served as White House Chief of Staff for President Ronald Reagan. From 2001 to 2005, he was the United States ambassador to Japan for President George W. Bush.

== Early life ==
Baker was born on November 15, 1925, in Huntsville, Tennessee, to Dora Ladd Baker and Howard Baker Sr. His father served as a Republican member of the US House of Representatives from 1951 to 1964, representing Tennessee's Second District. In 1934, when he was 8 years old, his mother, Dora, died of appendicitis. His father would later marry Irene Bailey. Baker attended The McCallie School in Chattanooga, and after graduating, he attended Tulane University in New Orleans. Baker was an alumnus of the Alpha Sigma Chapter of the Pi Kappa Phi fraternity. During World War II, he trained at a U.S. Navy facility on the campus of the University of the South in Sewanee, Tennessee, in the V-12 Navy College Training Program. He served as a lieutenant in the United States Navy and graduated from the University of Tennessee College of Law in 1949. That year, he was admitted to the Tennessee bar and began his law practice.

== U.S. Senate career ==
Baker began his political career in 1964, when he lost to the liberal Democrat Ross Bass in a U.S. Senate election to fill the unexpired term of the late Senator Estes Kefauver. However, Baker only lost by 4.7% points, the closest that a Republican had come to being popularly elected to the Senate from Tennessee.

In 1966, Bass lost the Democratic primary to the Governor of Tennessee, Frank G. Clement, and Baker handily won his Republican primary race against Kenneth Roberts, 112,617 (75.7%) to 36,043 (24.2%). Baker won the general election, capitalizing on Clement's failure to energize the Democratic base, especially organized labor. He won by a somewhat larger-than-expected margin of 56% to Clement's 44%. Baker thus became the first Republican U.S. senator from Tennessee since the Reconstruction era and the first Republican to be popularly elected to the Senate from Tennessee. Baker voted for both the Civil Rights Act of 1968 and the nomination of Thurgood Marshall to the U.S. Supreme Court.

Baker was re-elected in 1972 and 1978 and served from January 3, 1967, to January 3, 1985. In 1969, he was already a candidate for the Minority Leadership position that opened up with the death of his father-in-law, Everett Dirksen, but Baker was defeated 24–19 by Hugh Scott. At the beginning of the next Congress, in 1971, Baker ran again, losing again to Scott, 24–20.

When Scott retired, Baker was elected as leader of the Senate Republicans in 1977 by his Republican colleagues, defeating Robert Griffin, 19–18. Baker led the Senate GOP for the last eight years of his tenure, serving two terms as Senate Minority Leader from 1977 to 1981, and two terms as Senate Majority Leader from 1981 to 1985, a role he transitioned to after the Republicans gained the majority in the Senate in the 1980 elections.

Baker did not seek further re-election and concluded his Senate career in 1985. He was succeeded by Democratic Representative and future Vice President Al Gore.

== Nixon administration ==
President Richard Nixon asked Baker in 1971 to fill one of the two empty seats on the Supreme Court of the United States. When Baker took too long to decide whether he wanted the appointment, Nixon changed his mind and nominated William Rehnquist instead.

=== Watergate investigation ===
In 1973 and 1974, Baker was the influential ranking minority member of the United States Senate Watergate Committee, chaired by Senator Sam Ervin, which investigated the Watergate scandal. Baker famously asked aloud, "What did the President know and when did he know it?" The question is sometimes attributed to being given to him by his counsel and former campaign manager, future U.S. Senator Fred Thompson.

John Dean, former White House Counsel to Nixon, revealed to Senate Watergate chief counsel Samuel Dash that Baker had "secret dealings" with the White House during the congressional investigation. Although Baker, as a US senator, would be a juror in any future impeachment trial, Baker was recorded, on February 22, 1973, promising Nixon, "I'm your friend. I'm going to see that your interests are protected."

Watergate reporter Bob Woodward wrote that then "both the majority Democrats and minority Republicans agreed to share all information." Ultimately, one such document shared by Nixon lawyer J. Fred Buzhardt inadvertently suggested the presence of Nixon's secret taping system.

== Presidential campaign ==
Baker was frequently mentioned by insiders as a possible nominee for Vice President of the United States on a ticket headed by incumbent President Gerald Ford in 1976. According to many sources, Baker was a frontrunner until he disclosed that his wife, Joy, was a recovered alcoholic. Ford, whose own wife, Betty, was an alcoholic (albeit undisclosed at the time), chose Kansas U.S. Senator Bob Dole.

Baker ran for U.S. president in 1980, dropping out of the race for the Republican nomination after losing the Iowa caucuses to George H. W. Bush and the New Hampshire presidential primary to Ronald Reagan even though a Gallup poll had him in second place in the presidential race at 18%, behind Reagan at 41% as late as November 1979. Baker's support of the 1978 Panama Canal Treaties was overwhelmingly unpopular, especially among Republicans, and it was a factor in Reagan's choosing Bush instead as his running mate. Ted Stevens served as Acting Minority Leader during Baker's primary campaign.

== Reagan administration ==
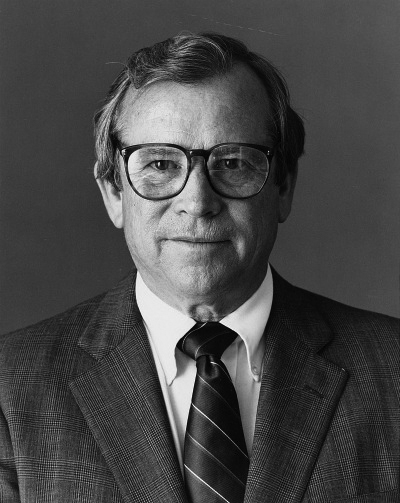
Baker in 1989

In 1984, Baker received the Presidential Medal of Freedom.

In October 1983, Baker voted in favor of the bill establishing Martin Luther King Jr. Day as a federal holiday.

As a testament to Baker's skill as a negotiator and an honest and amiable broker, Reagan tapped him to serve as White House Chief of Staff during part of Reagan's second term (1987–1988). Many saw that as a move by Reagan to mend relations with the Senate, which had deteriorated somewhat under the previous chief of staff, Donald Regan. In accepting the appointment, Baker chose to skip another bid for the White House in 1988.

== Later life ==
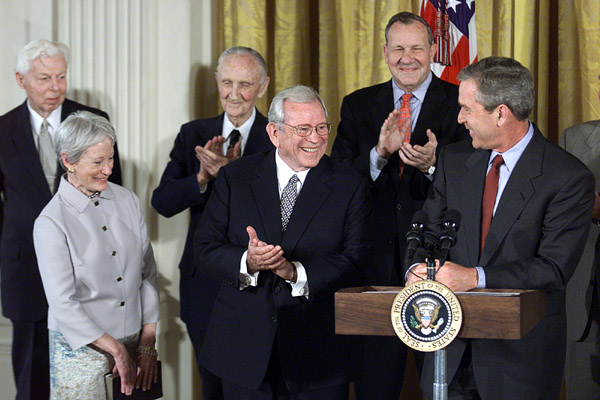
Baker with President George W. Bush in 2001

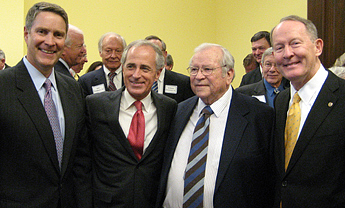
Baker with Bill Frist, Bob Corker, and Lamar Alexander in 2007.

President George W. Bush nominated Baker to serve as U.S. ambassador to Japan in March 2001. He was sworn in on June 26 and presented his credentials on July 5. During Baker's tenure, Japan supported the US-led Iraq War and implemented an embargo on American beef due to a BSE outbreak. Baker announced his resignation in December 2004 after returning to the United States for open heart surgery in August.

In 2003, the Howard. H. Baker Jr. Center for Public Policy was established at the University of Tennessee to honor him. Vice President Dick Cheney gave a speech at the 2005 ground-breaking ceremony for the center's new building. Upon the building's completion in 2008, U.S. Supreme Court Justice Sandra Day O'Connor assisted in the facility's dedication. In 2023, the Baker Center was transformed into the Baker School of Public Policy and Public Affairs, becoming the first school of public policy and public affairs at any public university in Tennessee.

In March 2005, Baker was appointed as a senior advisor to Citigroup.

In 2007, Baker joined fellow former Senate Majority Leaders Bob Dole, Tom Daschle, and George Mitchell to found the Bipartisan Policy Center, a non-profit think tank that works to develop policies suitable for bipartisan support. He was an advisory board member for the Partnership for a Secure America, a not-for-profit organization dedicated to recreating the bipartisan center in American national security and foreign policy. From 2005 to 2011, Baker was a member of the board of directors of the International Foundation for Electoral Systems, a nonprofit that provides international election support.

From 2005 to his death, Baker served as senior counsel to the law firm of his father and his grandfather Baker Donelson.

Baker was an accomplished lifelong photographer. His photographs have often been exhibited and were published in National Geographic, Life, and in the books Howard Baker's Washington (1982), Big South Fork Country (1993), and Scott's Gulf: The Bridgestone/Firestone Centennial Wilderness (2000). In 1993, he received the International Award of the American Society of Photographers, and in 1994, he was elected into the Hall of Fame of the Photo Marketing Association.

== Death ==
On June 26, 2014, Baker died at the age of 88 from complications of a stroke that he had suffered a week earlier. He was in his native Huntsville, Tennessee, with his wife, Nancy, by his side.

== Honors ==
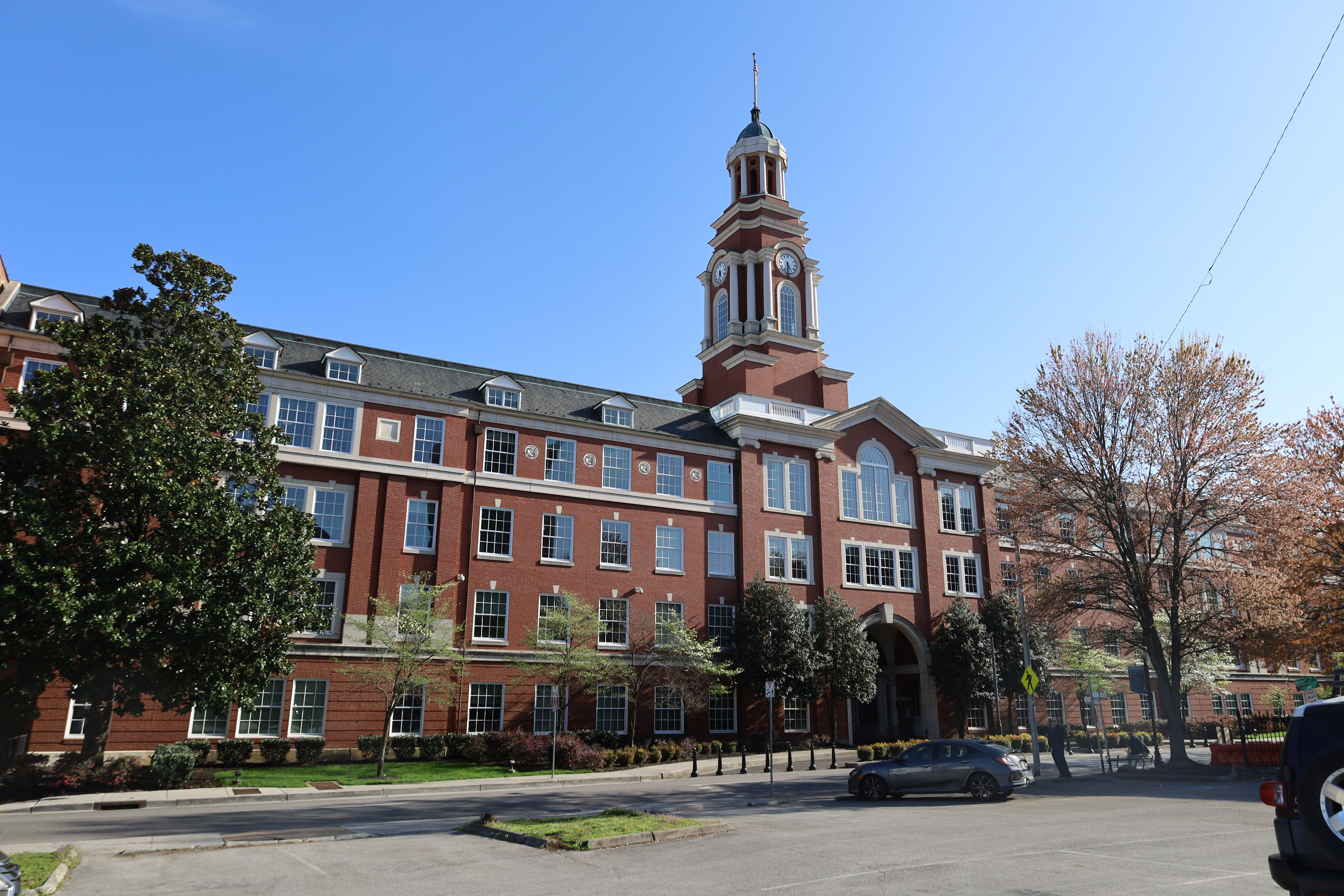
The Howard H. Baker, Jr. United States Courthouse in Knoxville, Tennessee in 2025

- He received the Golden Plate Award of the American Academy of Achievement in 1973.
- He received the US Senator John Heinz Award for Greatest Public Service by an Elected or Appointed Official in 1981, given out annually by the Jefferson Awards
- He received the Presidential Medal of Freedom in 1984.
- The rotunda at the University of Tennessee College of Law was renamed for Baker.
- While he was delivering a commencement speech during his grandson's graduation at East Tennessee State University, Johnson City, Tennessee, on May 5, 2007, Baker was awarded an honorary doctorate degree.
- He received the Order of the Paulownia Flowers, 2008 (Japan)

== Personal life ==
Baker, a Presbyterian, was married twice. He married his first wife, Danice Joy Dirksen, the daughter of former Senate Minority Leader Everett Dirksen, in 1951. Together, they had two children, a son and a daughter. After she died of cancer on April 24, 1993, Baker married U.S. Senator Nancy Kassebaum, daughter of Kansas Governor Alf Landon, on December 7, 1996.

== See also ==
- Snail darter controversy

== Works cited ==
- Annis, James Lee (2007) [1995]. Howard Baker: Conciliator in an Age of Crisis. Madison Books. ISBN 978-1-57233-591-2.

Party political offices
Preceded by Bradley Frazier	Republican nominee for U.S. Senator from Tennessee (Class 2); 1964, 1966, 1972, 1978	Succeeded by Victor Ashe
Preceded by Everett Dirksen; Gerald Ford	Response to the State of the Union address 1968; Served alongside: George H. W. Bush, Peter Dominick, Gerald Ford, Robert Griffin, Thomas Kuchel, Mel Laird, Bob Mathias, George Murphy, Dick Poff, Chuck Percy, Al Quie, Charlotte Reid, Hugh Scott, Bill Steiger, John Tower	Vacant Title next held by Donald Fraser, Scoop Jackson, Mike Mansfield, John McCormack, Patsy Mink, Ed Muskie, Bill Proxmire
Preceded by Anne Armstrong	Keynote Speaker of the Republican National Convention; 1976	Succeeded by Guy Vander Jagt
Preceded by Hugh Scott	Senate Republican Leader; 1977–1979	Succeeded by Ted Stevens; Acting
Vacant Title last held by Ed Muskie	Response to the State of the Union address 1978, 1979; Served alongside: John Rhodes	Succeeded by Ted Stevens; John Rhodes
Preceded by Ted Stevens; Acting	Senate Republican Leader; 1980–1985	Succeeded by Bob Dole
U.S. Senate
Preceded by Ross Bass	U.S. Senator (Class 2) from Tennessee; 1967–1985; Served alongside: Al Gore, Bill Brock, Jim Sasser	Succeeded by Al Gore
Political offices
Preceded by Hugh Scott	Senate Minority Leader; 1977–1979	Succeeded by Ted Stevens; Acting
Preceded by Ted Stevens; Acting	Senate Minority Leader; 1980–1981	Succeeded by Robert Byrd
Preceded by Robert Byrd	Senate Majority Leader; 1981–1985	Succeeded by Bob Dole
Preceded by Donald Regan	White House Chief of Staff; 1987–1988	Succeeded by Kenneth Duberstein
Diplomatic posts
Preceded by Tom Foley	United States Ambassador to Japan; 2001–2005	Succeeded by Tom Schieffer
