= Hosea T. Lockard =

American judge (1920–2011)

Hosea T. Lockard (June 24, 1920 - December 12, 2011) was an African-American Criminal Court Judge in the U.S. State of Tennessee for Shelby County. He was born in Ripley, Tennessee, and was raised on a farm in the nearby town of Henning by Albert and Lucille Lockard, also of Ripley. He grew up during segregation and attended public schools in Memphis, Tennessee, 50 miles southwest of Ripley because African-Americans were not allowed to attend the all-white public schools in Ripley.

After serving in the U.S. Army in the early 1940s, Lockard returned to school and completed college at LeMoyne-Owen College in Memphis. He then applied to law school at Memphis State University (now the University of Memphis) but was denied admission because of his race. Lockard attended Lincoln University School of Law in St. Louis, Missouri, which had been established by the Missouri General Assembly as a law school for African-Americans. After graduating in 1950, he returned to Tennessee and was admitted to practice law in 1951.

In 1955, Lockard became president of the Memphis Branch of the NAACP and served in that position until 1958. He headed up their legal committee, and during this time, he was joined by Russell Sugarmon, Vasco and Maxine Smith, Jesse Turner, Billy Kyles, Benjamin Hooks and A.W. Willis in fighting for and achieving success in the desegregation of the Memphis Street Railway Company., public buildings, restaurants and the University of Memphis.

He built a successful law practice and became the first African-American member of a Tennessee governor's cabinet, serving as administrative assistant to Gov. Buford Ellington from 1967 to 1971. He advised President Lyndon B. Johnson on civil rights issues and matters pertaining to race relations.

As a judge, he served on the Shelby County Criminal Court from 1975 to 1994 and remained active in the legal community until physical ailments and a stroke slowed him down.

Lockard was married to Ida Walker Lockard for 49 years. He died in his sleep of natural causes.
