= Frank G. Clement =

American politician (1920–1969)

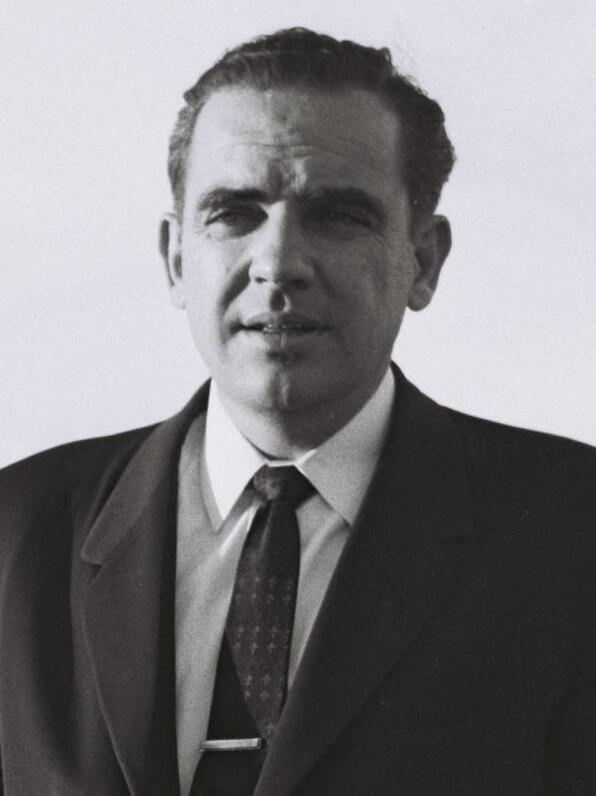

41st Governor of Tennessee
- In office January 15, 1963 – January 16, 1967
- Lieutenant: James Bomar; Jared Maddux
- Preceded by: Buford Ellington
- Succeeded by: Buford Ellington
- In office January 15, 1953 – January 19, 1959
- Lieutenant: Jared Maddux
- Preceded by: Gordon Browning
- Succeeded by: Buford Ellington

Personal details
- Born: Frank Goad Clement; June 2, 1920 Dickson, Tennessee, U.S.
- Died: November 4, 1969 (aged 49) Nashville, Tennessee, U.S.
- Party: Democratic
- Spouse: Lucille Christianson (m. 1940)
- Children: 3, including Bob
- Education: Cumberland University; Vanderbilt University (LLB)

Military service
- Allegiance: United States
- Branch/service: United States Army
- Years of service: 1943–1946
- Rank: First Lieutenant
- Battles/wars: World War II

Frank Goad Clement (June 2, 1920 – November 4, 1969) was an American lawyer and politician who served as the 41st governor of Tennessee from 1953 to 1959 and from 1963 to 1967. Inaugurated for the first time at age 32, he was the state's youngest and longest-serving governor in the 20th century with 10 years of service, having been elected to the governorship in 1952 and re-elected in 1954 and again in 1962. Clement owed much of his rapid political rise to his ability to deliver rousing, mesmerizing speeches. His sermon-like keynote address at the 1956 Democratic National Convention has been described as both one of the best and one of the worst keynote addresses in the era of televised conventions.

As governor, Clement oversaw the state's economic transformation from a predominantly agricultural state to an industrial state. He increased funding for education and mental health, and was the first Southern governor to veto a segregation bill. In 1956, he dispatched the National Guard to disperse a crowd attempting to prevent integration at Clinton High School. He attempted to enter national politics, and although his aggressive speeches at the 1956 Democratic national convention impressed some members of his own party, they disgusted many other politicians and brought an end to his federal political career. His final years, including his last term as governor, were marked by severe alcohol abuse which deeply affected his personal and professional life. His wife, tired of his alcoholism, filed for divorce in 1969. He died in a car accident soon after announcing his intention to run for another term.

== Early life ==
Clement was born at the Hotel Halbrook in Dickson, Tennessee, the son of Robert Samuel Clement, a local attorney and politician, and Maybelle (Goad) Clement, who operated the hotel. The family moved around for several years, living briefly in Vermont and Kentucky, before returning to Dickson in the 1930s. Clement graduated from Dickson High School in 1937. While still young, he took speaking lessons with his aunt.

Clement attended Cumberland University from 1937 to 1939, where he was a member of the Tennessee Lambda chapter of Sigma Alpha Epsilon fraternity. He then attended Vanderbilt University Law School, graduating with an LL.B in 1942. He worked as an agent for the FBI for about a year, mainly investigating internal security and espionage cases. In November 1943, at the height of World War II, he enlisted in the U.S. Army, eventually rising to the rank of first lieutenant and commanding officer of Company C of the Military Police Battalion at Camp Bullis in Texas.

After leaving the Army, Clement worked as counsel for the Tennessee Railroad and Public Utilities Commission from 1946 to 1950. He was an alternate delegate to the 1948 Democratic National Convention. During this same period, he was elected State Commander of Tennessee's American Legion, a position through which he developed relationships with veterans in all of Tennessee's counties. In the early 1950s, he practiced law with his father in Dickson.

== First two terms as Governor of Tennessee, 1953 to 1959 ==
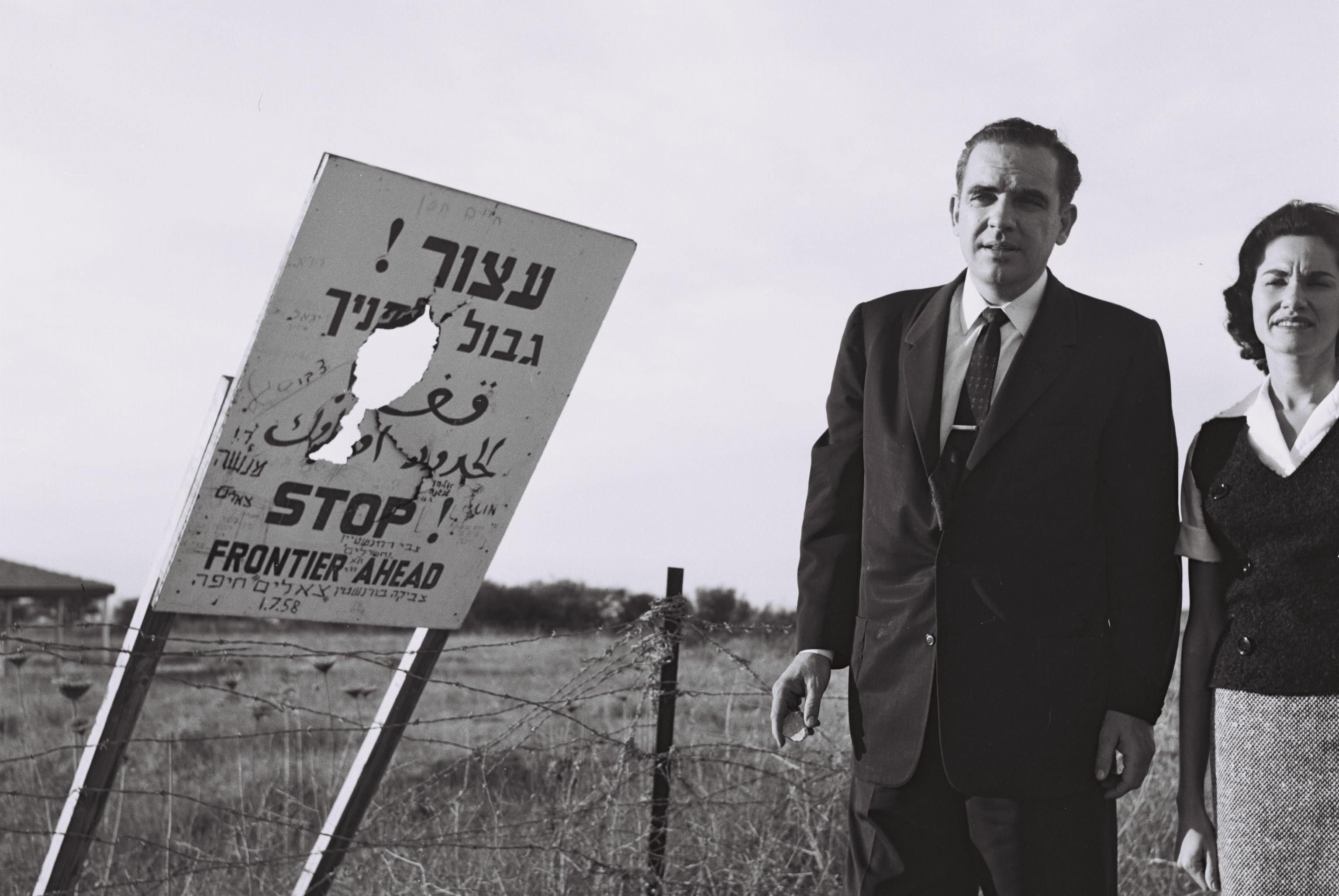
Frank Clement during a visit to Israel in 1958.

In the 1952 gubernatorial election, Clement challenged incumbent Gordon Browning for the Democratic Party's nomination. Browning, nearly twice Clement's age, derided Clement as a "demagogue" and "pipsqueak." Clement had the support of political boss E. H. Crump and Nashville Banner publisher James Stahlman, however, and travelled to all 95 of the state's counties, giving speeches in which he assailed Browning as "dishonest, indecent, and immoral." He defeated Browning for the nomination, 302,487 votes to 245,156, and routed the Republican candidate, Madisonville attorney Beecher Witt, in the general election. Clement was only 32 years old when he won the election and took office. Upon inauguration, he became the youngest governor in the nation.

During his first term, Clement authorized a bond issue to provide free textbooks to children in grades 1 through 12, a first for the state (textbooks had previously been free through only the 3rd grade). He also implemented the state's first long-range highway construction project, and established a mental health department (now the Department of Mental Health and Substance Abuse Services). Clement raised the state's sales tax from 2% to 3%, an unpopular move that would haunt him in later elections.

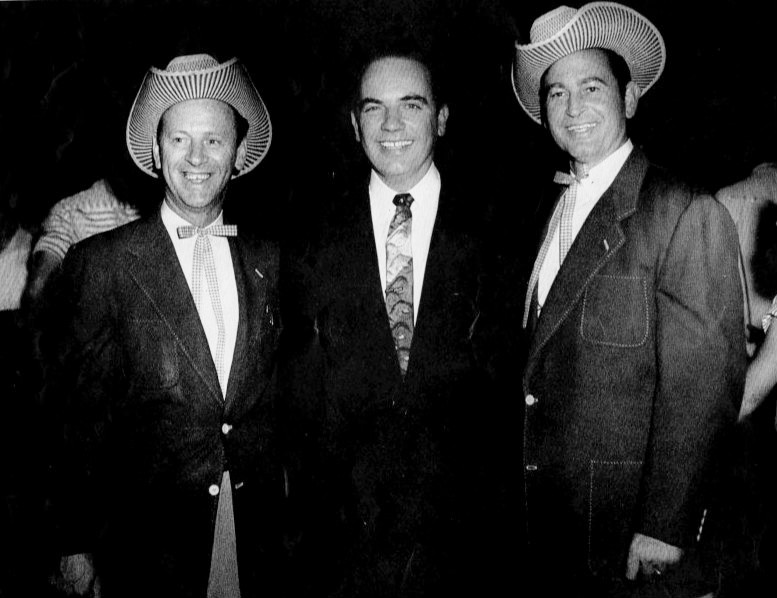
Governor Clement (center), photographed with country music stars Jack Anglin and Johnnie Wright in 1957

In 1953, a state constitutional convention proposed eight amendments to the state constitution, all of which were subsequently approved by voters. The amendments included the extension of the gubernatorial term from two to four years, the repeal of the poll tax, and the authorization of consolidated city-county (or "metropolitan") governments.

While the new constitutional amendments prevented governors from seeking a second consecutive term, Clement was allowed to run for a full four-year term in 1954. He was challenged in the primary by former Governor Browning, who accused Clement and his father of "peddling" state influence. Several of Clement's close associates, among them his secretary of state, Eddie Friar, and comptroller, Jean Bodfish, turned against him. Browning was unable to match Clement's oratorical skills and fundraising capabilities, however, and lost the nomination, 481,808 votes to 195,156. Clement easily defeated fringe candidate John R. Neal and other token opposition in the general election.

In 1954, the U.S. Supreme Court declared state segregation laws unconstitutional in its landmark decision in Brown v. Board of Education. Clement ordered state schools to comply with the law. In 1955, Clement vetoed a bill introduced by 85-year-old state senator Charles A. Stainback that would have effectively maintained segregation in schools in Fayette and Haywood counties. He also threatened to veto any attempt to change the state's mandatory school attendance law, and rejected a request by the Parents School Preference Committee to use the National Guard to prevent integration (as Arkansas Governor Orval Faubus had done). In September 1956, he stationed National Guard troops in Clinton, Tennessee, to protect the first black students to attend Clinton High School from anti-integration protesters.

Constitutionally ineligible to run for governor in 1958, Clement supported the successful run of his campaign manager and Commissioner of Agriculture, Buford Ellington, and returned to the practice of law.

== 1956 DNC keynote address ==
By the mid-1950s, Clement had national aspirations. During the 1956 presidential race, he was among the candidates on the ballot for the party's vice presidential nomination. He was also chosen to give the keynote address at the Democratic National Convention that year in Chicago, as party leaders hoped his speaking ability could help offset the popularity of the Republican incumbent, Dwight D. Eisenhower.

Clement's speech resembled a standard Tennessee stump speech, with a strong evangelical, sermon-like tone. He derided the Republican Party as the "party of privilege and pillage," referred to Vice President Richard Nixon as the "vice hatchet man," and accused President Eisenhower of staring down the "green fairways of indifference" (a reference to Eisenhower's love of golf). He stated that Democrats would not "crucify the American farmer on a Republican cross of gold," recalling the Cross of Gold speech delivered by William Jennings Bryan at the party's 1896 convention. Clement's speech is often remembered for his repeated use of the phrase, "How long, America, O how long?"

Clement's speech received raucous applause from convention delegates, and was well received by Democrats in general. Washington Post columnist Colbert I. King recalled watching the speech as a teenager and thinking afterward that Eisenhower and Nixon had no chance of winning. Future president Bill Clinton, then 9 years old, watched the speech from his parents' living room, and later described it as a "rousing" address in his memoir, My Life. Future Georgia governor Zell Miller, who would later deliver speeches at the 1992 Democratic convention and the 2004 Republican convention, missed the birth of his son to see Clement's speech.

Many members of the national media panned Clement's speech. Time columnist Lance Morrow called the speech a "symphony of rhetorical excess." New York Herald Tribune writer Red Smith likened the speech to "slaying the Republicans with the jawbone of an ass." David Halberstam described it as a "thundering overheated, overlong, overkill speech" that ended Clement's career as a national politician. Evangelist Billy Graham disapproved of the speech, and distanced himself from Clement afterward. Arthur Langlie, who was slated to deliver the keynote address at the Republican convention later that year, stated, "I'll be passing up the Chicago brand of prejudicial fire and brimstone."

== Third term as Governor, 1963 to 1967 ==
In 1962, Clement once again sought the party's nomination for governor. In the primary, he defeated Memphis attorney Bill Farris and Chattanooga mayor Rudy Olgiati, by 97,521 votes In the general election, he defeated Maryville attorney Hubert Patty, the Republican candidate, and retired naval captain William Anderson of Waverly, who was running as an independent by 215,764 votes.

When Senator Estes Kefauver died in office in August 1963, Clement surprised some by not appointing himself to the office, but rather a caretaker, Herbert S. Walters. However, Clement did enter the 1964 Democratic primary for the seat, losing to Congressman Ross Bass of Pulaski by 96,968 votes. During the campaign, Clement was attacked for the sales tax increase enacted during his first tenure as governor.

Clement's alcohol addiction reached a critical level during the 1960s. His alcoholism caused him to become alienated from many of his friends and affected his thinking ability. Although newspapers did not extensively cover his addiction to liquor, friends and family members noticed that Clement spent much time drinking and lost some of his political effectiveness.

Since the 1964 election was for the balance of Kefauver's unexpired term, the seat was to be contested again in 1966. In the primary, Clement defeated Bass for the nomination, by 18,243 votes. His campaign faltered in the general election, however, as his long-time political ally, Buford Ellington, refused to endorse him, and he failed to pick up critical endorsements from the Nashville Tennessean, the Nashville Banner, and the Memphis Commercial Appeal. The Republican candidate, rising politician Howard Baker, successfully connected Clement to President Lyndon B. Johnson's social policies, which were unpopular among rural Tennesseans. On election day, Baker defeated Clement, by 99,220 votes

== Later life and other work ==
After leaving office, Clement practiced law in partnership with Grant Smith. His wife, who had become tired of her husband's alcoholism, filed for divorce in 1969. He announced his intention to run for a fourth term as governor in 1970, but on November 4, 1969, shortly after the start of his campaign, he was involved in a car crash near Nashville and was pronounced dead. At the time of his death, he and his estranged wife were headed towards reconciliation. His 10 total years as governor of Tennessee are the longest any person served in the position in the 20th century, and longer than all but two 19th-century governors, John Sevier and William Carroll. His remains were interred at Dickson County Memorial Gardens near Dickson.

In 1959, Clement served as honorary Co-Chairman on the Board of Directors for the newly founded Country Music Association (CMA). He and Albert Gore, Sr., were bestowed this honor in appreciation for their public service to the state of Tennessee and their support in accommodating the country music industry. In 1970, the CMA honored Clement with the Connie B. Gay Award in recognition of his outstanding service to the association.

Clement was a 32nd degree Mason and a member of the Shriners. He was also an active Methodist, and taught Sunday school throughout the 1960s.

== Family and legacy ==
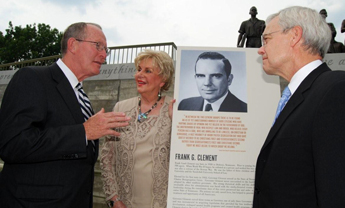
Senator Lamar Alexander (left) discusses Governor Clement's role in the 1956 desegregation of Clinton High School with Clement's sister, Anna Belle, and son, Bob

Clement's sister, Anna Belle Clement O'Brien (1923–2009), worked as his chief of staff in the 1960s, and later served in the state legislature, initially in the state House of Representatives (1975–1977), and afterward in the state senate (1977–1991).

Clement married Lucille Christianson in 1940. They had three sons, two of whom are still living. Bob Clement has served as Tennessee Public Service Commissioner, director of the Tennessee Valley Authority, president of Cumberland University, and a member of the United States House of Representatives from 1987 to 2003. Frank G. Clement, Jr., has been an attorney, a probate court judge, and currently serves on the Tennessee Court of Appeals.

The Hotel Halbrook, where Clement was born in Dickson, is now home to the Clement Railroad Hotel Museum, and has been listed on the National Register of Historic Places. Clement's namesakes include buildings at Austin Peay State University, the University of Tennessee, Tennessee Tech, Tennessee State University, and the University of Tennessee at Martin, as well as a golf course at Montgomery Bell State Park and a bridge over Barren Fork in McMinnville.

== See also ==
- List of governors of Tennessee

Party political offices
Preceded by Gordon Browning	Democratic nominee for Governor of Tennessee; 1952, 1954	Succeeded by Buford Ellington
Preceded by Paul A. Dever	Keynote Speaker of the Democratic National Convention; 1956	Succeeded by Frank Church
Preceded by Buford Ellington	Democratic nominee for Governor of Tennessee; 1962	Succeeded by Buford Ellington
Preceded by Ross Bass	Democratic nominee for U.S. Senator from Tennessee (Class 2); 1966	Succeeded by Ray Blanton
Political offices
Preceded by Gordon Browning	Governor of Tennessee; 1953–1959	Succeeded by Buford Ellington
Preceded by Buford Ellington	Governor of Tennessee; 1963–1967	Succeeded by Buford Ellington
