= Herbert S. Walters =

American politician (1891–1973)

Herbert Sanford Walters
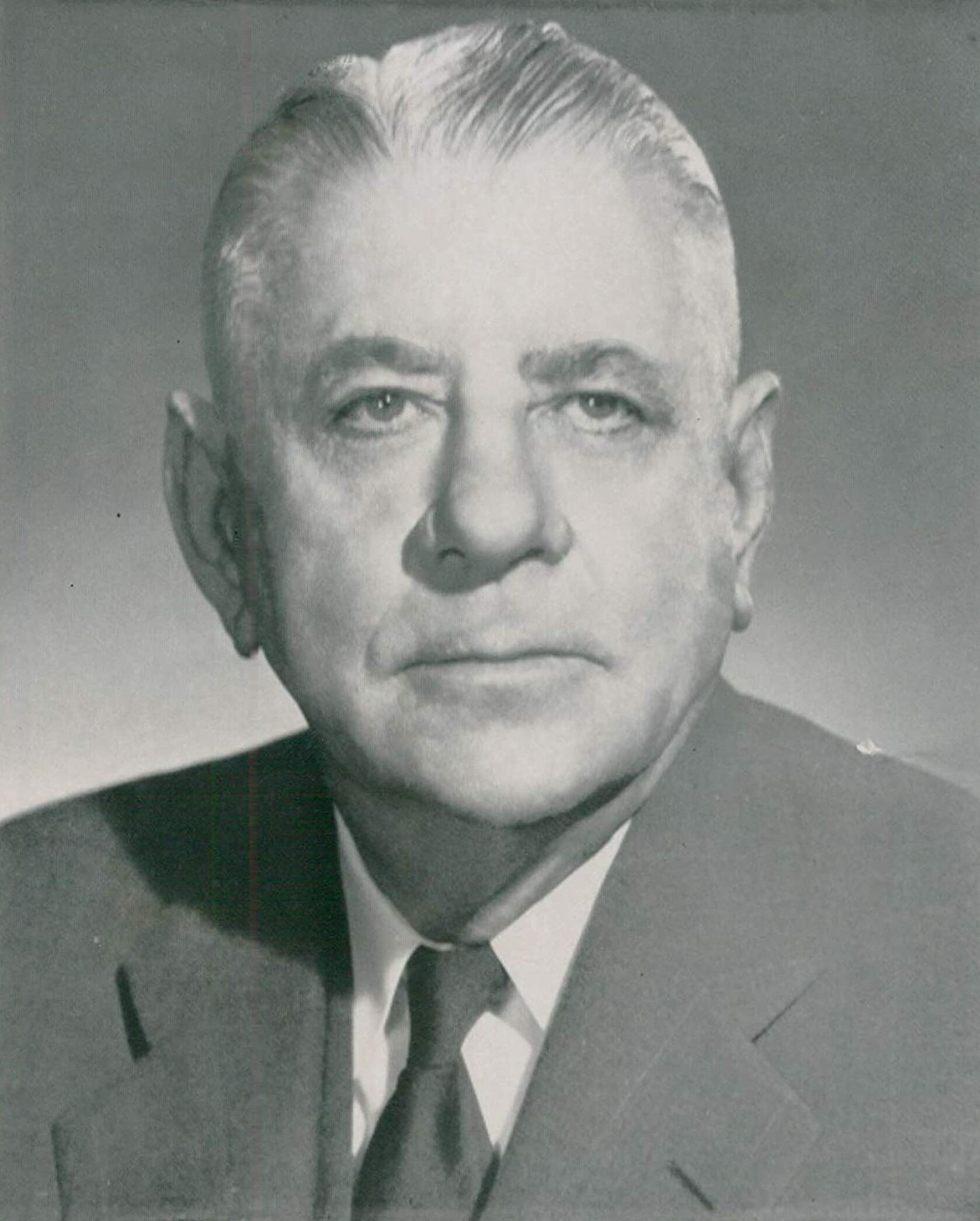

United States Senator from Tennessee
- In office August 20, 1963 – November 3, 1964
- Appointed by: Frank G. Clement
- Preceded by: Estes Kefauver
- Succeeded by: Ross Bass

Member of the Tennessee House of Representatives
- In office 1934–1936

Personal details
- Born: November 17, 1891 Jefferson County, Tennessee, U.S.
- Died: August 17, 1973 (aged 81) Knoxville, Tennessee, U.S.
- Resting place: Emma Jarnagin Cemetery
- Party: Democratic

Herbert Sanford Walters (November 17, 1891 – August 17, 1973) was an American politician who served as a Democratic United States senator for Tennessee from 1963 to 1964.

== Early life and education ==
Walters was a native of Jefferson County, Tennessee. He was a graduate of the former Castle Heights Military Academy in Lebanon, Tennessee, and attended Carson–Newman University in Jefferson City, Tennessee, and the University of Tennessee.

== Career ==
Walters earned his fortune as a highly successful contractor in roadbuilding. He became a prominent banker in East Tennessee. He served a term in the Tennessee House of Representatives (1934 to 1936) prior to serving in the state cabinet as Tennessee Commissioner of Highways.

Walters served over twenty-five years as Tennessee committeeman on the Democratic National Committee. On July 9, 1947, he met with President Harry S. Truman at the White House along with Tennessee committeewoman Mrs. Albert E. Hill and other party leaders from Arkansas, Kentucky, Louisiana, Oklahoma and Tennessee.

Walters was appointed to the Senate on August 20, 1963, by Tennessee Governor Frank G. Clement, upon the death of Senator Estes Kefauver. He was widely viewed as a much more conservative voice than Kefauver, who "was regarded one of the most liberal of Southern Democrats". Only three months shy of 72 when assuming office, Walters was immediately assumed to be a caretaker who would show no interest in running for the balance of Kefauver's term in 1964, which proved to be correct. Political observers felt that Clement took this action in part because he intended to run for the office himself in 1964, which also proved to be correct, but was unwilling to face the consequences of appointing himself to the office in the interim, which would also led to his succession as governor by lieutenant governor Jared Maddux, an event which would have entailed additional consequences of its own. However, Clement failed to capture the Democratic nomination for the seat in the August 1964 Democratic primary, losing to Congressman Ross Bass.

Walters served his time in the Senate rather quietly, very much in the shadow of the state's senior senator, Albert Gore, Sr. He supported most of the initiatives of Democratic President Lyndon B. Johnson, who became president only three months after Walter's appointment to the Senate with the assassination of John F. Kennedy.

Walters voted against civil rights legislation, including the Civil Rights Act of 1964.

Walters' term of service in the Senate ended on November 3, 1964, immediately after the election of his successor, Ross Bass, which is traditional with appointed senators who do not seek election. After leaving the Senate, Walters served as chairman of the Tennessee State Democratic Executive Committee until 1972.

Walters also served as a trustee of the University of Tennessee. A biography of Walters, The Herbert Walters Story by author Howard Hill, was published at about the time of his Senate service. Walters is buried at Emma Jarnagin Cemetery in Morristown, Tennessee. Walters State Community College in Morristown is named in his honor. The museum in Morristown's Rose Center is named after him.

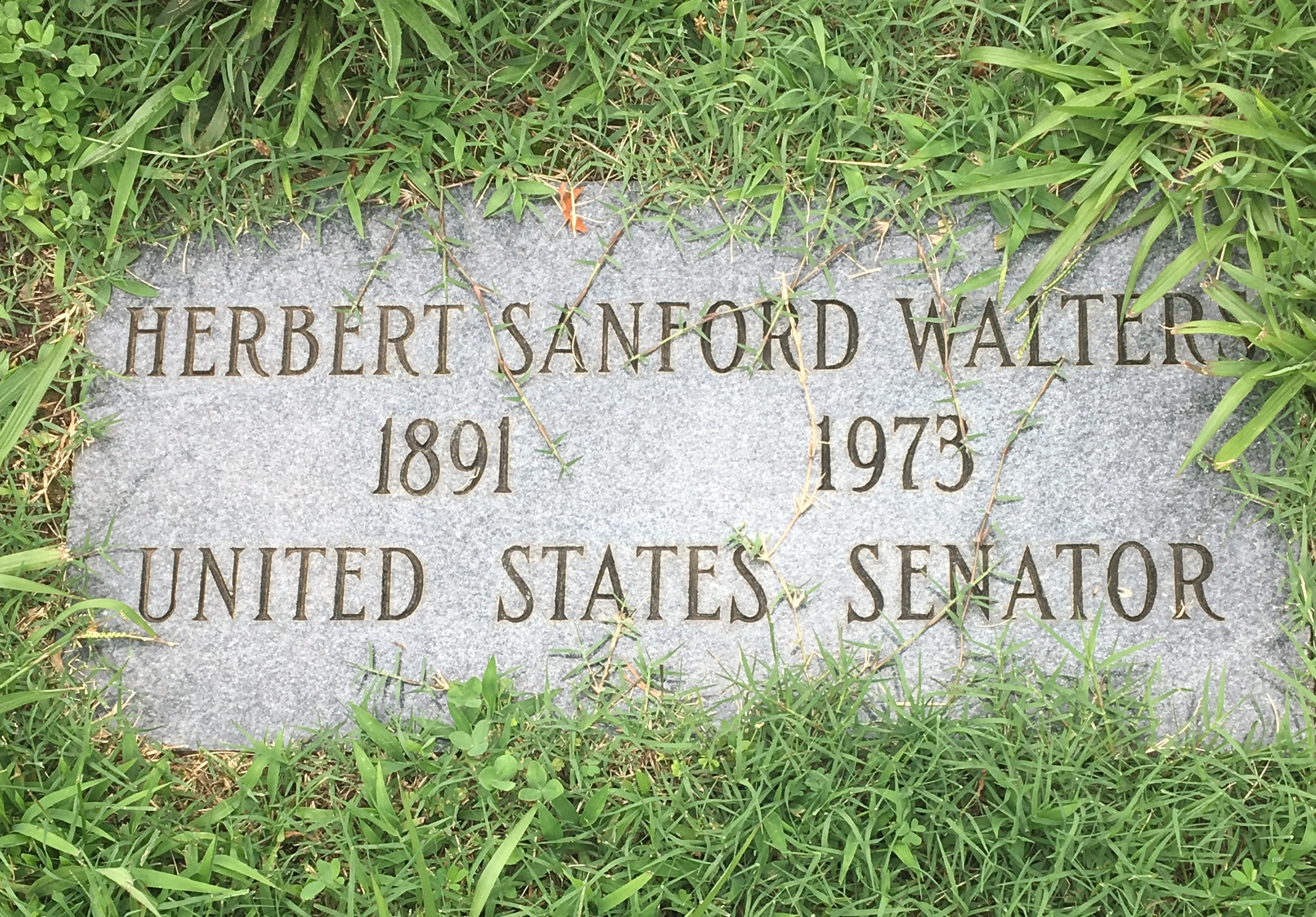
The grave of senator Herbert S. Walters.

U.S. Senate
Preceded by C. Estes Kefauver	U.S. senator (Class 2) from Tennessee; 1963–1964; Served alongside: Albert Gore	Succeeded by Ross Bass
