= Ross Bass =

American politician (1918–1993)

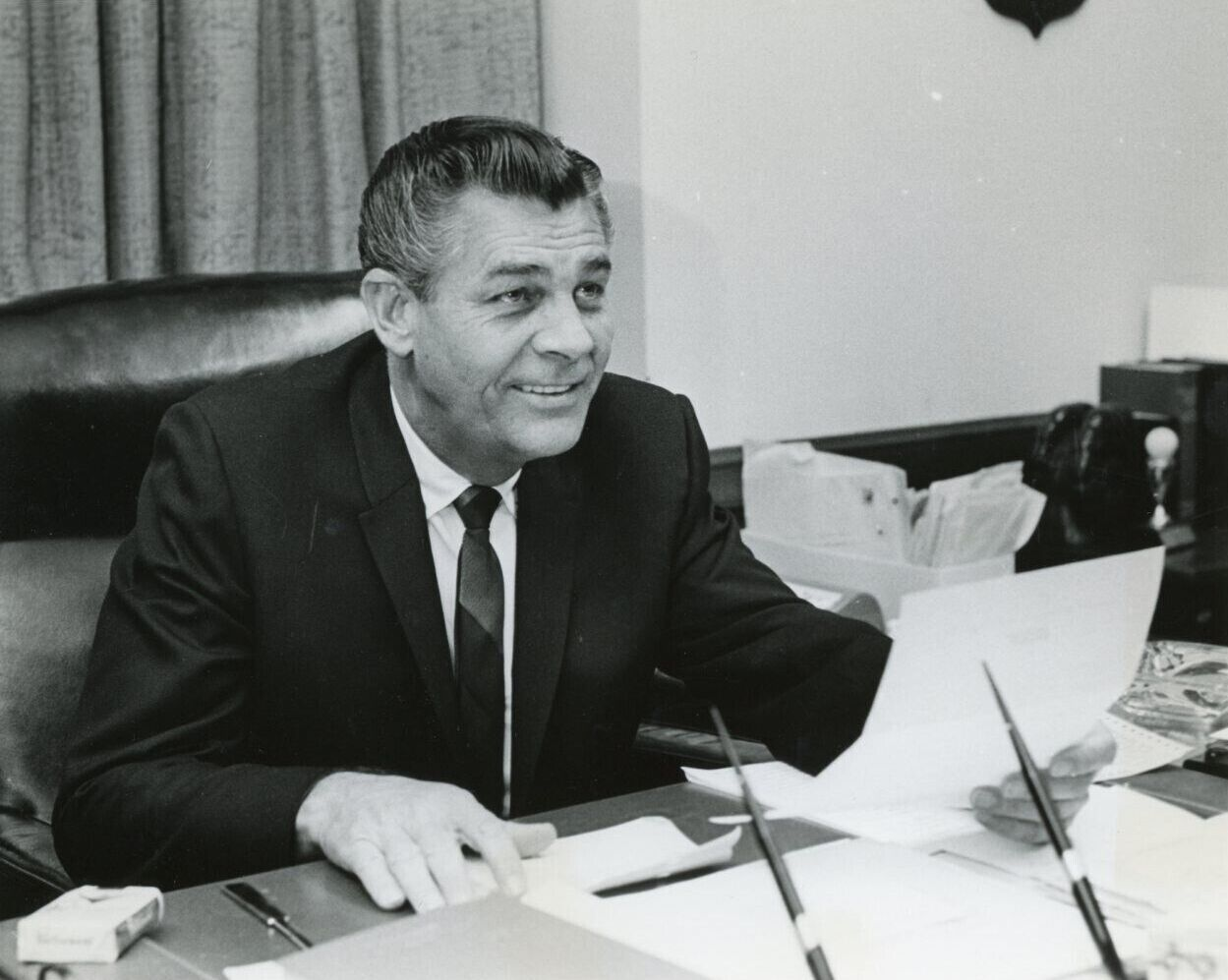
- Bass in 1965

United States Senator from Tennessee
- In office November 4, 1964 – January 3, 1967
- Preceded by: Herbert S. Walters
- Succeeded by: Howard Baker

Member of the U.S. House of Representatives from Tennessee's 6th District
- In office January 3, 1955 – November 3, 1964
- Preceded by: James Patrick Sutton
- Succeeded by: William R. Anderson

Personal details
- Born: March 17, 1918 Giles County, Tennessee, U.S.
- Died: January 1, 1993 (aged 74) Miami Shores, Florida, U.S.
- Resting place: Maplewood Cemetery, Pulaski, Tennessee, U.S.
- Party: Democratic
- Spouse(s): Avanell K Bass; Judy Bobo; Jacqui Colter
- Education: Martin Methodist College

Military service
- Branch/service: United States Army Air Corps
- Years of service: 1941-1945
- Rank: Captain
- Battles/wars: World War II

Ross Bass (March 17, 1918 – January 1, 1993) was an American politician from Tennessee. A liberal member of the Democratic Party, he served in the United States House of Representatives from 1955 to 1964 and in the United States Senate from 1964 to 1967.

== Early life ==
Bass was the son of a circuit-riding Methodist minister in rural Giles County, attended the local public schools, and graduated from Martin Methodist Junior College, Pulaski, Tennessee in 1938.

He joined the United States Army Air Forces and served as a bombardier in Europe during World War II, reaching the rank of captain. After his 1945 discharge Bass opened a flower shop in Pulaski, the county seat. He was named postmaster of Pulaski in 1946, serving until 1954.

== United States Representative ==
In 1954, Bass was elected as a Democratic U.S. Congressman from Tennessee's 6th District, which included Pulaski. He was reelected four times. Bass signed on to the 1956 anti-desegregation Southern Manifesto, but was the only Democratic Representative from the rural South to vote for the Civil Rights Act of 1964. The only other Southern Representatives to vote for the bill were from large cities—Richard Fulton from Nashville, Tennessee, Charles Weltner from Atlanta, Georgia, Claude Pepper from Miami, Florida and four Representatives from Texas (Jack Brooks of Beaumont, Henry B. Gonzalez of San Antonio, J. J. Pickle of Austin and Albert Thomas of Houston). Bass also voted in favor of the 24th Amendment to the U.S. Constitution in 1962.

== United States Senator ==
In 1963, Senator Estes Kefauver died in office. Governor Frank G. Clement made no secret that he wanted to run in the special election due in 1964 for the final two years of Kefauver's term. To that end, he appointed one of his cabinet members, Herbert S. Walters, to serve as a caretaker until the special election. However, Clement's plan backfired when Bass defeated him in the Democratic primary held in August.

In November, Bass defeated the Republican nominee, Howard Baker by only 51,575 votes the closest that a Republican had come to winning election to the Senate from Tennessee at the time. Since the election was for an unexpired term, and in the Senate seniority is a very important consideration when being considered for committee assignments, office assignments, and the like, Bass was sworn in as soon as the election results could be certified in order to give him a slight seniority advantage over other freshmen Senators elected in 1964. Bass became Tennessee's junior Senator (the senior Senator at that time being Albert Gore, Sr.) and prepared to run for a full term in 1966. Bass voted in favor of the Voting Rights Act of 1965.

However, this race proved problematic for Bass. Clement still desired the seat for himself, especially since he could not run for reelection as governor in 1966 (in those days, Tennessee governors were barred from immediately succeeding themselves). Clement wanted to avoid being forced out of politics, as he had once before when faced with term limits the first time in 1958. Due to a large Republican crossover vote, Bass lost the August 1966 Democratic primary to Clement, even though he received 10% more votes than in the previous election. Clement went on to lose resoundingly to Baker in the general election.

== Later campaigns ==
Bass subsequently made two attempts to re-enter politics. He ran for the 1974 Democratic nomination for governor, but finished fifth in a nine-candidate field—well behind the eventual winner, Ray Blanton.

In 1976 he entered the Democratic primary for his old House seat and won the nomination. The district, however, had been significantly redrawn since his previous service. Bass found himself running in a large amount of territory that he did not know and that did not know him. Much of this area was located in suburban territory near Memphis and Nashville that had turned heavily Republican, at least at the national level. Bass lost badly 64% to 36% to the incumbent Republican representative, Robin Beard.

== Personal life ==
His first marriage to Avanell K Bass ended in divorce in 1967. He married Judy Bobo, of Nashville, in 1975; they divorced in 1979. In 1992 he married Jacqui Colter, who outlived him. After his divorce in 1979, he moved to Florida, where he lived in Miami Shores until his death from lung cancer in 1993, aged 74. He was buried in Maplewood Cemetery. His first cousin is actor Dewey Martin.

Party political offices
Preceded by Estes Kefauver	Democratic nominee for U.S. Senator from Tennessee (Class 2); 1964	Succeeded by Frank G. Clement
U.S. House of Representatives
Preceded by James Patrick Sutton	Member of the U.S. House of Representatives from Tennessee's 6th congressional district 1955–1964	Succeeded by William R. Anderson
U.S. Senate
Preceded by Herbert S. Walters	U.S. senator (Class 2) from Tennessee; 1964–1967; Served alongside: Albert Gore	Succeeded by Howard H. Baker
