= Dan Kuykendall =

American politician and businessman (1924–2008)

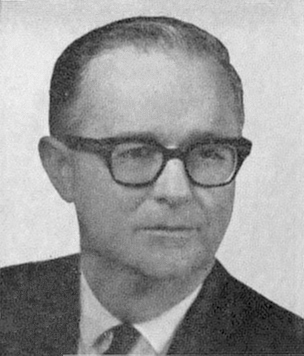
- Official portrait, c. 1973

Member of the U.S. House of Representatives from Tennessee
- In office January 3, 1967 – January 3, 1975
- Preceded by: George W. Grider
- Succeeded by: Harold Ford Sr.
- Constituency: 9th district (1967–1973); 8th district (1973–1975)

Personal details
- Born: Dan Heflin Kuykendall; July 9, 1924 Cherokee, Texas, U.S.
- Died: June 12, 2008 (aged 83) Memphis, Tennessee, U.S.
- Party: Republican
- Spouse: Jacqueline Meyer (m. 1951)
- Children: 4
- Education: Texas A&M University

Military service
- Allegiance: United States
- Branch/service: Army Air Corps
- Years of service: 1942–1945
- Rank: First lieutenant
- Battles/wars: World War II

Dan Heflin Kuykendall (July 9, 1924 – June 12, 2008) was an American politician and businessman who served as a United States representative from Tennessee's 8th and 9th congressional districts from 1967 until 1975. A member of the Republican Party, Kuykendall was the first Republican to be elected in the 8th district since 1920 and was the first to be elected in the 9th district since 1872.

== Early life and education ==
Dan Heflin Kuykendall was born in Cherokee, Texas, on July 9, 1924. During World War II he served as a B-29 pilot from 1942 to 1945. In 1947 he graduated Texas A&M University and moved to Memphis, Tennessee, in 1955 through employment with Procter & Gamble as an executive. On July 6, 1951, he married Jacqueline Meyer and would later have four children with her.

== Career ==
=== Early politics ===
Kuykendall was active in the Tennessee GOP in an era when it barely existed at the state level outside of East Tennessee. During the 1956 presidential election he volunteered for Dwight D. Eisenhower's presidential campaign and during the 1960 presidential election he volunteered for Richard Nixon's presidential campaign. In 1962, he managed former city councilman Ed Davis' campaign for Congress in the 9th Congressional district and Davis came within only 1,200 votes of defeating 22-year incumbent Clifford Davis. From 1963 to 1964, he served as a co-chairman of the Shelby County Republican Party, which was returning to prominence after years of irrelevance. During the 1964 Republican presidential primaries he supported Senator Barry Goldwater.

In July 1963 he stated that he was interested in challenging Senator Albert Gore, Sr. in Tennessee's 1964 Senate election and on September 6, 1963, the directors of the Republican Association of Memphis and Shelby County adopted a resolution urging Kuykendall to run for Senate either against Gore or to fill the vacancy created by Senator Estes Kefauver's death. On February 6, 1964, he announced that he would seek the Republican nomination to run in the Senate election against Gore and would officially announce his candidacy on April 7. Despite Gore having won in 1958 in a landslide with 79.00% of the vote against the Republican 19.01%, Kuykendall received 46.38% of the vote to Gore's 53.62% and in the simultaneous special election Howard Baker received 47.41% of the vote to Ross Bass's 52.14% with both Democrats benefiting from the coattail effect of President Lyndon Johnson winning Tennessee with 55.50% of the vote.

=== House of Representatives ===
On March 12, 1966, he stated that he had no political plans outside the Ninth Congressional district, on April 26 he announced that he would challenge incumbent Representative George W. Grider, and on May 25 he formally announced his candidacy for the Republican nomination in the district. He won the Republican nomination without opposition and in the general election he narrowly defeated Grider with 52.16% of the vote. He was the first Republican to represent Memphis in Congress in the 20th century.

Kuykendall established himself as one of the House's most conservative members and was known for being long-winded to the point of what many felt was verbosity, and as a consequence was given the derisive nickname "The Tennessee Talking Horse". During his tenure he served on the Interstate and Foreign Committee and Subcommittee on Aeronautics and Transportation and in 1971 he cosponsored an attempt to impeach Supreme Court Justice William O. Douglas, but nothing came of it and Douglas retired in 1975.

Kuykendall quickly became popular in his district, even though most of its living residents had never been represented by a Republican before. He easily won reelection in the 1968 and 1970 elections by over 25% both times. During the 1968 presidential election he supported Richard Nixon and stated that "a vote for Wallace is a vote for Humphrey".

After the 1970 United States census, Tennessee lost a congressional district and the General Assembly renumbered Kuykendall's district as the 8th district with Republican areas in his former district being replaced with Democratic areas. He won reelection in 1972 elections against black pastor J. O. Patterson Jr., but by only 11.25%.

==== Watergate ====
During the Watergate scandal and the ensuing impeachment process, Kuykendall initially defended President Richard Nixon. He blamed "nonpoliticians" for Watergate by placing blame onto people such as Attorney General John N. Mitchell, stated that those who supported impeachment were trying to lynch Nixon, and he agreed with Nixon's decision to dismiss special prosecutor Archibald Cox. When the House decided to investigate the case for impeachment on October 23, 1973, Kuykendall came to the House floor with a noose and warned the other members against using lynch law tactics. However, on August 5, 1974, he stated that he would reexamine his position on impeachment due to Nixon having refused to hand over evidence to the House and stated that he would support impeachment shortly before Nixon's resignation.

Following Vice President Spiro Agnew's resignation the House voted on House Minority Leader Gerald Ford's confirmation as vice president to President Nixon and all House Republicans vote in unanimity including Kuykendall. When the House voted on former New York Governor Nelson Rockefeller's confirmation as vice president to President Gerald Ford, he was one of 153 Republicans to vote for him.

In 1974, the Democrats nominated state Representative Harold Ford, a young member of a prominent black funeral-directing family in Memphis whose political involvement dated to the days of E. H. Crump. Ford staged a tremendous get-out-the-vote campaign in the Memphis black community. He also received the support of many whites angered by Kuykendall's initially ardent support of Nixon in the midst of Watergate. On election night, it looked like Kuykendall had managed to hold onto the seat by a razor-thin margin. However, Ford's supporters found eight ballot boxes purported to have been in the dumpster of the then all-white Shelby County Election Commission. When those ballots were counted, it was enough for Ford to unseat Kuykendall by only 744 votes—one of the closest races of the 1974 cycle. Since then, Republicans have never come close to retaking the Memphis-area district. The district was renumbered the 9th District again in the 1980s round of redistricting, as Tennessee regained a House seat due to its population now growing at a rate above, rather than below, the national average. At that time, it was drawn as a majority-black district, and Republicans lost interest in the seat.

=== Post-House career ===
As is the case with many former members of Congress, Kuykendall stayed in the Washington, D.C., area and lived for many years in Bethesda, Maryland. In 2002, Kuykendall returned to the region and lived in Germantown, a suburb of Memphis.

Kuykendall died on June 12, 2008, after a long illness at age 83.

== Electoral history ==
Dan Kuykendall electoral history

1964 Tennessee Senate election
Party	Candidate	Votes	%	±%
Democratic	Albert Gore Sr.	570,542	53.62%	−25.38%
Republican	Dan Kuykendall	493,475	47.84%	+27.37%
Total votes		1,064,017	100.00%	

1966 Tennessee Ninth Congressional District election
Party	Candidate	Votes	%	±%
Republican	Dan Kuykendall	47,489	52.16%	+4.93%
Democratic	George W. Grider	43,553	47.84%	−4.66%
Total votes		91,042	100.00%	

1968 Tennessee Ninth Congressional District election
Party	Candidate	Votes	%	±%
Republican	Dan Kuykendall	73,293	59.35%	+7.19%
Democratic	James E. Irwin	45,434	36.79%	−11.05%
Independent	Claude Cockrell	3,746	3.03%	+3.03%
Independent	Charles Gordon Vick	1,018	0.82%	+0.82%
Total votes		123,491	100.00%	

1970 Tennessee Ninth Congressional District election
Party	Candidate	Votes	%	±%
Republican	Dan Kuykendall	72,498	62.62%	+3.27%
Democratic	Michael Osborn	43,279	37.38%	+0.59%
Total votes		115,777	100.00%	

1972 Tennessee Ninth Congressional District election
Party	Candidate	Votes	%	±%
Republican	Dan Kuykendall	93,173	55.36%	+55.36%
Democratic	J. O. Patterson Jr.	74,240	44.11%	−55.89%
Independent	Louise Porter	893	0.53%	+0.53%
Total votes		115,777	100.00%	

Party political offices
Preceded by Hobart F. Atkins	Republican nominee for U.S. Senator from Tennessee (Class 1); 1964	Succeeded by Bill Brock
U.S. House of Representatives
Preceded by George W. Grider	Member of the U.S. House of Representatives from Tennessee's 9th congressional district 1967–1973	District eliminated after 1970 Census
Preceded by Ed Jones	Member of the U.S. House of Representatives from Tennessee's 8th congressional district 1973–1975	Succeeded by Harold Ford Sr.
