= George W. Grider =

American lawyer and politician

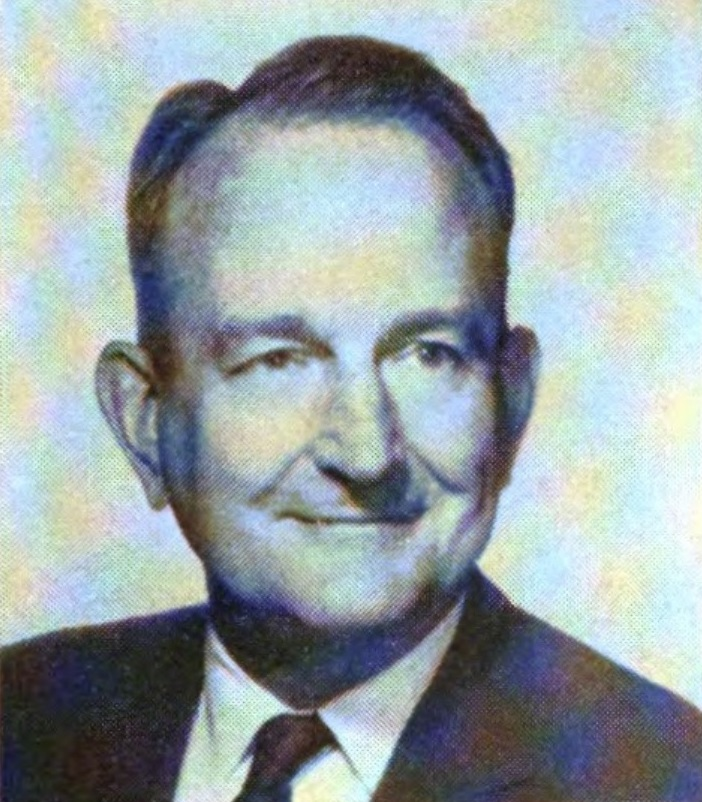

Member of the U.S. House of Representatives from Tennessee's 9th district
- In office January 3, 1965 – January 3, 1967
- Preceded by: Clifford Davis
- Succeeded by: Dan Kuykendall

Personal details
- Born: October 1, 1912 Memphis, Tennessee, U.S.
- Died: March 20, 1991 (aged 78) Memphis, Tennessee, U.S.
- Party: Democratic
- Nickname: "Gindy"

Military service
- Allegiance: United States
- Branch/service: United States Navy
- Years of service: 1936-1947
- Rank: Captain
- Commands: USS Flasher (SS-249); USS Cubera (SS-347)

George William Grider (October 1, 1912 – March 20, 1991) was a United States Navy captain, an attorney, and a Democratic U.S. representative from Tennessee from 1965 to 1967.

== Early life ==
Grider was born in Memphis, Tennessee, son of John McGavock Grider (killed in action, World War I, aviation), and the brother of John McGavock Grider Jr. As a youth, he attended the public schools and received an appointment to the United States Naval Academy (USNA) in Annapolis, Maryland, where he was graduated and received his naval commission in 1936. While at Annapolis, he married in secret in contravention to USNA regulations, and was officially married in 1938.

== Naval career ==
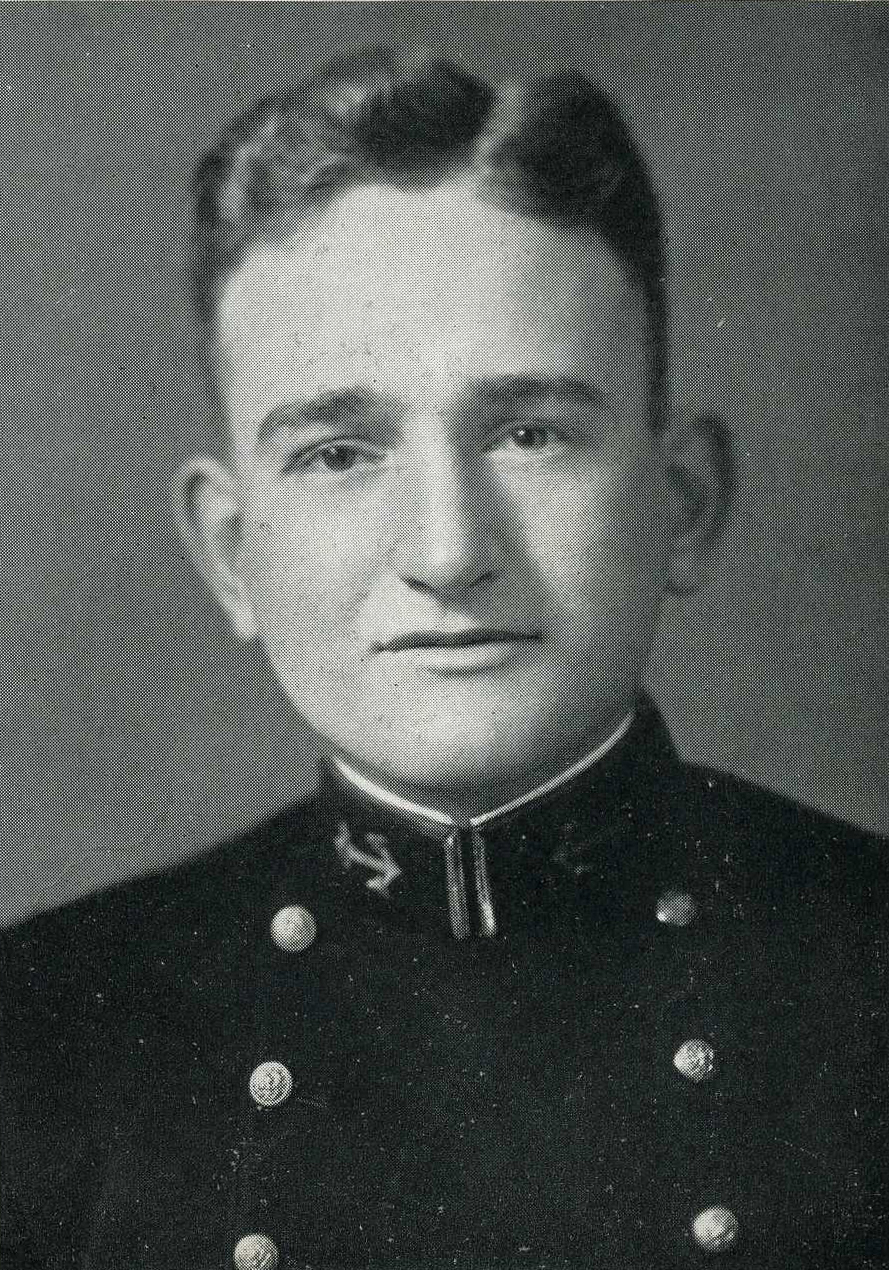
Yearbook photo of Grider as a midshipman first class

After Grider's commission as an ensign, he was assigned to the USS Mississippi (BB-41), as catapult officer, and subsequently to the USS Rathburne (DD-113).

After this service Grider was assigned to the Navy's Submarine Warfare School, and following his successful completion of its requirements was assigned to one of the World War II era's most accomplished submarines, the USS Skipjack (SS-184).

Grider was serving as an instructor at the Fleet Sonar School in San Diego, California, at the time of the Pearl Harbor attack, and then assigned to a submarine deployed in the defense of San Diego during the time after the attack when both naval and civilian officials wondered if the attack was to be followed by an attempted Japanese invasion of the West Coast.

Subsequently, Grider was assigned to the USS Wahoo (SS-238) as engineering officer, serving behind Dudley W. Morton and Richard O'Kane, and then to two billets as executive officer, on the USS Pollack (SS-180), and the USS Hawkbill (SS-366). After this, he was given command of the USS Flasher (SS-249), and then USS Cubera (SS-347). For his service Grider was awarded the Navy Cross. Grider told the story of his World War II experiences in the submarine service in the book War Fish which he wrote with Lydel Sims, published in 1958 by Little, Brown and Company.

Grider was forced to retire from active naval service at the rank of captain in 1947 after suffering a heart attack. He then enrolled in the law school of the University of Virginia in Charlottesville, Virginia, where he was graduated with a law degree in 1950 and then, subsequent to his admission to the Tennessee bar, began the practice of law in Memphis.

== World War II summary ==
Summary of CDR George W. Grider's USS Flasher (SS-249) War Patrols
	Departing From	Date	Days	Wartime Credit Ships/Tonnage	JANAC Credit Ships/Tonnage	Patrol Area
Flasher-5	Freemantle, Australia	November 1944	48	5 / 41,700	6 / 42,868	South China Sea
Flasher-6	Freemantle, Australia	January 1945	75	1 / 2,100	1 / 850	South China Sea

CDR Grider's Ranking Compared with Other Top Skippers
Ranking	Number of Patrols	Ships/Tons Credited	Ships/Tons JANAC
53	2	6 / 43,800	7 / 43,718

== Public service and later life ==
In 1956 and 1957, Grider served on the Memphis Planning Commission, and from 1959 to 1964, the Shelby County Quarterly Court (in reality a legislative rather than a judicial body, it was the predecessor to the body today serving as the Shelby County Commission). It was from this office that Grider launched a successful campaign for the Democratic nomination for the Memphis-based 9th congressional district seat in the August 1964 Democratic primary, defeating 13-term incumbent Clifford Davis, a holdover from the era of E. H. "Boss" Crump's domination of Memphis politics. Grider did not have an easy time in the November election, however. Republican influence was on the rise in the Memphis area, largely due to a massive crossover of white voters from the Democrats. Grider won by only five percentage points. He likely would not have won had it not been for Lyndon Johnson's gigantic landslide in that year's presidential election. He was one of two naval veterans elected to the House from western Tennessee in that election, the other being William Anderson. Grider voted in favor of the Voting Rights Act of 1965.

However, Grider was to serve only one term in the House; in November 1966 he was defeated for reelection by Shelby County Republican Party former co-chairman Dan Kuykendall, in what was a very good year for Republicans in Tennessee (Howard Baker was elected to the first of three Senate terms) and nationally (where the huge Democratic advantages in both houses of Congress and in governorships were considerably reduced). Kuykendall had specific advantages: he had done surprisingly well as the Republican nominee in the United States Senate race against Albert Gore Sr. two years earlier, and there was no Republican gubernatorial nominee in Tennessee that year. Kuykendall also took advantage of the large number of white Memphis-area Democrats switching to the Republicans. Ordinarily, the lack of a gubernatorial race would be considered a political disadvantage, but in fact it allowed Tennessee Republicans to concentrate their resources on winnable races, such as those faced by Kuykendall and Baker. Grider was the last white Democrat to represent a significant portion of Memphis until State Senator Steve Cohen was elected to Congress from the ninth district in 2006.

Following his defeat, Grider moved to Niagara Falls, New York, where he served for eight years as vice president and general counsel for the Carborundum Company, an abrasives manufacturer.

In 1975 Grider returned to Memphis and resumed the practice of law there, and was still living in the city of his birth at the time of his death in 1991. He was buried at the Memphis National Cemetery.

== See also ==
- Tennessee's congressional delegations

== Notes ==
U.S. House of Representatives
Preceded by Clifford Davis	Member of the U.S. House of Representatives from Tennessee's 9th congressional district 1965–1967	Succeeded by Dan Kuykendall
