= 1952 United States presidential election in Tennessee =

- November 4, 1952

Nominee	Dwight D. Eisenhower	Adlai Stevenson
Party	Republican	Democratic
Home state	New York	Illinois
Running mate	Richard Nixon	John Sparkman
Electoral vote	11	0
Popular vote	446,147	443,710
Percentage	49.99%	49.71%

Eisenhower
50–60%
60–70%
70–80%
80–90%
Stevenson
50–60%
60–70%
70–80%
80–90%
President before election
Harry S. Truman
Democratic
Elected President
Dwight D. Eisenhower
Republican

The 1952 United States presidential election in Tennessee took place on November 4, 1952, as part of the 1952 United States presidential election. Tennessee voters chose 11 representatives, or electors, to the Electoral College, who voted for president and vice president.

For over a century after the Civil War, Tennessee was divided according to political loyalties established in that war. Unionist regions covering almost all of East Tennessee, Kentucky Pennyroyal-allied Macon County, and the five Western Highland Rim counties of Carroll, Henderson, McNairy, Hardin and Wayne voted Republican — generally by landslide margins — as they saw the Democratic Party as the "war party" who had forced them into a war they did not wish to fight. Contrariwise, the rest of Middle and West Tennessee who had supported and driven the state's secession was equally fiercely Democratic as it associated the Republicans with Reconstruction. After the disfranchisement of the state's African-American population by a poll tax was largely complete in the 1890s, the Democratic Party was certain of winning statewide elections if united, although unlike the Deep South, Republicans almost always gained thirty to forty percent of the statewide vote from mountain and Highland Rim support.

Between 1896 and 1948, the Republicans won statewide contests three times but only in the second did they receive down-ballot coattails by winning three congressional seats in addition to the rock-ribbed GOP First and Second Districts. In the early 1910s, prohibitionist “Independent Democrats” fled the party and formed a coalition, known as the “Fusionists,” with Republicans to elect Ben W. Hooper Governor, whilst in 1920 the national anti-Wilson and anti-League of Nations tide allowed the GOP to carry a few traditionally Democratic areas in Middle Tennessee and with them the state, and in 1928 anti-Catholicism against Democratic nominee Al Smith gave this powerfully fundamentalist state to Herbert Hoover.

After the beginning of the Great Depression, for the next third of a century, Republicans rarely contested statewide offices seriously despite continuing dominance of East Tennessee and half a dozen Unionist counties in the middle and west of the state. The Crump political machine that dominated state politics for a decade and a half, however, broke down in 1948 after Crump supported Dixiecrat Strom Thurmond but his own subordinates dissented knowing that a Democratic split would hand the state to the Republicans. Even Crump's long-time ally Senator Kenneth McKellar broke with him, and a Middle Tennessee liberal, Estes Kefauver, won the state's Senate seat. In 1949, after a failed effort six years before, Tennessee substantially modified its poll tax and entirely abolished it two years later, largely because the Crump machine had “block bought” voters’ poll taxes.

The abolition of the poll tax substantially increased voter turnout in Tennessee, if not to the same extent as in South Carolina. There was also the issue of the substantial Dixiecrat vote from 1948, especially with Thurmond's endorsement of Republican nominees former Supreme Allied Commander Dwight D. Eisenhower and California Senator Richard Nixon.

== Predictions ==
Source	Ranking	As of
Lansing State Journal	Likely D	September 17, 1952
Lubbock Morning Avalanche	Tilt D	October 24, 1952
The Greeneville Sun	Lean D	October 25, 1952
The Modesto Bee	Lean D	October 27, 1952
The Commercial Appeal	Tossup	October 31, 1952

== Results ==
1952 United States presidential election in Tennessee
Party	Candidate	Votes	%
Republican	Dwight D. Eisenhower	446,147	49.99%
Democratic	Adlai Stevenson	443,710	49.71%
Prohibition	Stuart Hamblen	1,432	0.16%
People’s	Vincent Hallinan	885	0.10%
Christian Nationalist	Douglas MacArthur	379 (Note: Except for two votes in Shelby County, votes for the Christian Nationalist Party were listed as a state-wide total and not by counties.)	0.04%
Total votes		892,553	100%

=== Results by county ===
County	Dwight D. Eisenhower Republican		Adlai Stevenson Democratic		Stuart Hamblen Prohibition		Vincent Hallinan People's		Margin		Total votes cast
County	#	%	#	%	#	%	#	%	#	%	Total votes cast
Anderson	10,489	53.88%	8,939	45.92%	38	0.20%	0	0.00%	1,550	7.96%	19,466
Bedford	2,611	37.44%	4,362	62.56%	0	0.00%	0	0.00%	-1,751	-25.12%	6,973
Benton	1,304	34.57%	2,452	65.01%	16	0.42%	0	0.00%	-1,148	-30.44%	3,772
Bledsoe	1,229	50.85%	1,158	47.91%	30	1.24%	0	0.00%	71	2.94%	2,417
Blount	11,708	69.22%	5,163	30.53%	24	0.14%	18	0.11%	6,545	38.69%	16,913
Bradley	4,606	63.36%	2,646	36.40%	9	0.12%	8	0.11%	1,960	26.96%	7,269
Campbell	4,557	65.63%	2,346	33.79%	19	0.27%	21	0.30%	2,211	31.84%	6,943
Cannon	930	37.97%	1,491	60.88%	6	0.24%	22	0.90%	-561	-22.91%	2,449
Carroll	3,741	56.46%	2,841	42.88%	23	0.35%	21	0.32%	900	13.58%	6,626
Carter	9,019	76.15%	2,707	22.86%	118	1.00%	0	0.00%	6,312	53.29%	11,844
Cheatham	536	19.31%	2,222	80.04%	5	0.18%	13	0.47%	-1,686	-60.73%	2,776
Chester	1,674	53.01%	1,484	46.99%	0	0.00%	0	0.00%	190	6.02%	3,158
Claiborne	3,221	59.62%	2,182	40.38%	0	0.00%	0	0.00%	1,039	19.24%	5,403
Clay	842	46.24%	968	53.16%	11	0.60%	0	0.00%	-126	-6.92%	1,821
Cocke	5,688	82.02%	1,247	17.98%	0	0.00%	0	0.00%	4,441	64.04%	6,935
Coffee	2,110	37.25%	3,537	62.44%	7	0.12%	11	0.19%	-1,427	-25.19%	5,665
Crockett	1,343	38.27%	2,155	61.41%	7	0.20%	4	0.11%	-812	-23.14%	3,509
Cumberland	3,282	59.75%	2,059	37.48%	81	1.47%	71	1.29%	1,223	22.27%	5,493
Davidson	35,916	40.99%	51,562	58.84%	81	0.09%	71	0.08%	-15,646	-17.85%	87,630
Decatur	1,406	45.35%	1,681	54.23%	13	0.42%	0	0.00%	-275	-8.88%	3,100
DeKalb	1,814	48.21%	1,949	51.79%	0	0.00%	0	0.00%	-135	-3.58%	3,763
Dickson	1,415	25.22%	4,196	74.78%	0	0.00%	0	0.00%	-2,781	-49.56%	5,611
Dyer	3,231	41.30%	4,531	57.92%	61	0.78%	0	0.00%	-1,300	-16.62%	7,823
Fayette	1,029	46.73%	1,173	53.27%	0	0.00%	0	0.00%	-144	-6.54%	2,202
Fentress	2,143	69.65%	934	30.35%	0	0.00%	0	0.00%	1,209	39.30%	3,077
Franklin	2,015	29.48%	4,786	70.03%	29	0.42%	4	0.06%	-2,771	-40.55%	6,834
Gibson	3,766	35.90%	6,687	63.74%	26	0.25%	12	0.11%	-2,921	-27.84%	10,491
Giles	1,649	25.98%	4,640	73.11%	29	0.46%	29	0.46%	-2,991	-47.13%	6,347
Grainger	3,030	76.28%	937	23.59%	2	0.05%	3	0.08%	2,093	52.69%	3,972
Greene	6,864	64.98%	3,656	34.61%	18	0.17%	25	0.24%	3,208	30.37%	10,563
Grundy	709	21.47%	2,583	78.23%	7	0.21%	3	0.09%	-1,874	-56.76%	3,302
Hamblen	5,031	67.19%	2,395	31.98%	62	0.83%	0	0.00%	2,636	35.21%	7,488
Hamilton	29,681	55.14%	23,832	44.27%	139	0.26%	178	0.33%	5,849	10.87%	53,830
Hancock	1,830	79.50%	458	19.90%	14	0.61%	0	0.00%	1,372	59.60%	2,302
Hardeman	1,256	31.17%	2,747	68.18%	8	0.20%	18	0.45%	-1,491	-37.01%	4,029
Hardin	2,459	59.28%	1,677	40.43%	12	0.29%	0	0.00%	782	18.85%	4,148
Hawkins	5,295	68.19%	2,404	30.96%	13	0.17%	53	0.68%	2,891	37.23%	7,765
Haywood	940	27.80%	2,432	71.93%	9	0.27%	0	0.00%	-1,492	-44.13%	3,381
Henderson	3,317	67.45%	1,601	32.55%	0	0.00%	0	0.00%	1,716	34.90%	4,918
Henry	2,421	29.77%	5,677	69.81%	12	0.15%	22	0.27%	-3,256	-40.04%	8,132
Hickman	1,044	28.38%	2,625	71.35%	4	0.11%	6	0.16%	-1,581	-42.97%	3,679
Houston	465	27.45%	1,229	72.55%	0	0.00%	0	0.00%	-764	-45.10%	1,694
Humphreys	898	25.16%	2,670	74.81%	1	0.03%	0	0.00%	-1,772	-49.65%	3,569
Jackson	1,138	40.25%	1,686	59.64%	3	0.11%	0	0.00%	-548	-19.39%	2,827
Jefferson	4,622	78.87%	1,228	20.96%	9	0.15%	1	0.02%	3,394	57.91%	5,860
Johnson	3,590	87.65%	506	12.35%	0	0.00%	0	0.00%	3,084	75.30%	4,096
Knox	44,358	62.32%	26,681	37.48%	113	0.16%	26	0.04%	17,677	24.84%	71,178
Lake	487	24.66%	1,475	74.68%	6	0.30%	7	0.35%	-988	-50.02%	1,975
Lauderdale	1,390	24.26%	4,340	75.74%	0	0.00%	0	0.00%	-2,950	-51.48%	5,730
Lawrence	4,561	51.07%	4,299	48.14%	71	0.79%	0	0.00%	262	2.93%	8,931
Lewis	540	29.05%	1,308	70.36%	11	0.59%	0	0.00%	-768	-41.31%	1,859
Lincoln	1,654	26.78%	4,510	73.01%	8	0.13%	5	0.08%	-2,856	-46.23%	6,177
Loudon	4,311	66.52%	2,138	32.99%	17	0.26%	15	0.23%	2,173	33.53%	6,481
Macon	2,602	69.20%	1,158	30.80%	0	0.00%	0	0.00%	1,444	38.40%	3,760
Madison	7,243	45.50%	8,623	54.17%	30	0.19%	23	0.14%	-1,380	-8.67%	15,919
Marion	2,227	42.91%	2,938	56.61%	12	0.23%	13	0.25%	-711	-13.70%	5,190
Marshall	1,525	28.44%	3,837	71.56%	0	0.00%	0	0.00%	-2,312	-43.12%	5,362
Maury	3,582	32.58%	7,377	67.09%	36	0.33%	0	0.00%	-3,795	-34.51%	10,995
McMinn	5,778	62.39%	3,440	37.15%	18	0.19%	25	0.27%	2,338	25.24%	9,261
McNairy	3,426	55.94%	2,698	44.06%	0	0.00%	0	0.00%	728	11.88%	6,124
Meigs	850	52.31%	754	46.40%	2	0.12%	19	1.17%	96	5.91%	1,625
Monroe	4,581	55.11%	3,693	44.42%	39	0.47%	0	0.00%	888	10.69%	8,313
Montgomery	2,573	30.78%	5,759	68.90%	17	0.20%	10	0.12%	-3,186	-38.12%	8,359
Moore	354	30.00%	826	70.00%	0	0.00%	0	0.00%	-472	-40.00%	1,180
Morgan	2,565	63.22%	1,492	36.78%	0	0.00%	0	0.00%	1,073	26.44%	4,057
Obion	2,682	36.51%	4,623	62.94%	32	0.44%	8	0.11%	-1,941	-26.43%	7,345
Overton	1,453	39.47%	2,209	60.01%	6	0.16%	13	0.35%	-756	-20.54%	3,681
Perry	762	39.00%	1,192	61.00%	0	0.00%	0	0.00%	-430	-22.00%	1,954
Pickett	1,003	64.71%	547	35.29%	0	0.00%	0	0.00%	456	29.42%	1,550
Polk	2,283	55.63%	1,821	44.37%	0	0.00%	0	0.00%	462	11.26%	4,104
Putnam	3,183	43.73%	4,096	56.27%	0	0.00%	0	0.00%	-913	-12.54%	7,279
Rhea	2,520	54.46%	2,090	45.17%	14	0.30%	3	0.06%	430	9.29%	4,627
Roane	5,583	60.13%	3,702	39.87%	0	0.00%	0	0.00%	1,881	20.26%	9,285
Robertson	1,834	26.59%	5,063	73.41%	0	0.00%	0	0.00%	-3,229	-46.82%	6,897
Rutherford	3,196	31.77%	6,793	67.52%	24	0.24%	48	0.48%	-3,597	-35.75%	10,061
Scott	3,274	73.82%	1,161	26.18%	0	0.00%	0	0.00%	2,113	47.64%	4,435
Sequatchie	535	37.57%	882	61.94%	7	0.49%	0	0.00%	-347	-24.37%	1,424
Sevier	7,244	87.17%	1,066	12.83%	0	0.00%	0	0.00%	6,178	74.34%	8,310
Shelby	65,170	47.53%	71,779	52.36%	112	0.08%	36	0.03%	-6,609	-4.83%	137,099 (Note: The total for this county includes two votes for Christian Nationalist candidate Douglas Macarthur.)
Smith	1,412	34.80%	2,622	64.61%	15	0.37%	9	0.22%	-1,210	-29.81%	4,058
Stewart	641	22.71%	2,170	76.87%	1	0.04%	11	0.39%	-1,529	-54.16%	2,823
Sullivan	15,596	56.58%	11,849	42.99%	71	0.26%	47	0.17%	3,747	13.59%	27,563
Sumner	2,233	28.10%	5,674	71.40%	40	0.50%	0	0.00%	-3,441	-43.30%	7,947
Tipton	1,312	19.54%	5,351	79.68%	34	0.51%	19	0.28%	-4,039	-60.14%	6,716
Trousdale	261	17.43%	1,236	82.57%	0	0.00%	0	0.00%	-975	-65.14%	1,497
Unicoi	3,453	74.81%	1,163	25.19%	0	0.00%	0	0.00%	2,290	49.62%	4,616
Union	2,087	75.78%	667	24.22%	0	0.00%	0	0.00%	1,420	51.56%	2,754
Van Buren	393	36.12%	674	61.95%	10	0.92%	11	1.01%	-281	-25.83%	1,088
Warren	1,912	34.68%	3,568	64.72%	21	0.38%	12	0.22%	-1,656	-30.04%	5,513
Washington	12,023	69.31%	5,245	30.24%	43	0.25%	36	0.21%	6,778	39.07%	17,347
Wayne	2,439	70.63%	1,008	29.19%	4	0.12%	2	0.06%	1,431	41.44%	3,453
Weakley	3,043	41.83%	4,198	57.70%	34	0.47%	0	0.00%	-1,155	-15.87%	7,275
White	1,374	37.00%	2,319	62.44%	13	0.35%	8	0.22%	-945	-25.44%	3,714
Williamson	2,326	36.17%	4,085	63.53%	19	0.30%	0	0.00%	-1,759	-27.36%	6,430
Wilson	2,449	32.57%	5,070	67.43%	0	0.00%	0	0.00%	-2,621	-34.86%	7,519
Totals	446,147	49.99%	443,710	49.71%	1,432	0.16%	885	0.10%	2,437	0.28%	892,553 (Note: This total includes 377 votes for Christian Nationalist candidate Douglas Macarthur that were not separated by county.)

==== Counties that flipped from Democratic to Republican ====
- Anderson
- Carroll
- Chester
- Hamilton
- Lawrence
- Meigs
- Sullivan

==== Counties that flipped from Dixiecrat to Democratic ====
- Shelby
- Fayette

== Analysis ==
Despite expectations that Democratic nominees Illinois Governor Adlai Stevenson II and running mate Alabama Senator John Sparkman had a slightly better chance of carrying the state, Tennessee was won by Eisenhower with 49.99 percent of the popular vote, against Stevenson's 49.71 percent. Eisenhower's 0.28 percentage point victory was the first of three consecutive Republican victories in the state, as Tennessee did not vote Democratic again until Lyndon B. Johnson’s landslide victory in 1964. The result deviated little from long-established partisan patterns, with Chester County — where Eisenhower was the first-ever Republican victor – the only county Eisenhower carried that neither Harding nor Hoover won. Nonetheless, whereas Harding's and Hoover's victories were based upon gains in Middle Tennessee, gains in the pro-Dixiecrat cotton counties of West Tennessee were most critical for Eisenhower: fifteen of the top twenty-four Thurmond counties were also amongst the top twenty-four in terms of Democratic loss since 1936. This is also the most recent election in which Tennessee voted differently from Kentucky (coincidentally, the closest Stevenson state in this election).

== See also ==
- United States presidential elections in Tennessee
- 1952 United States Senate election in Tennessee
- 1952 Tennessee gubernatorial election
