= 1952 Tennessee gubernatorial election =

- November 4, 1952
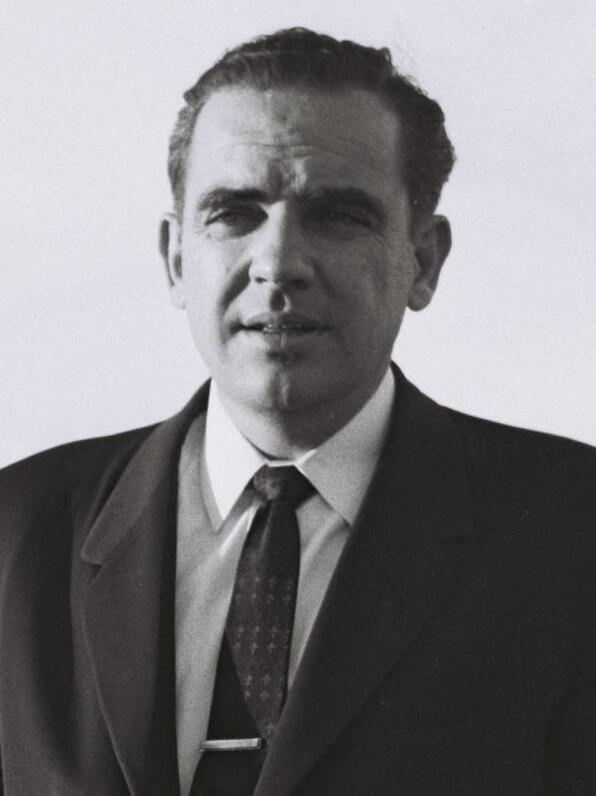

Nominee	Frank G. Clement	R. Beecher Witt
Party	Democratic	Republican
Popular vote	640,290	166,377
Percentage	79.37%	20.62%
- County results Clement: 50–60% 60–70% 70–80% 80–90% >90% Witt: 50–60%
Governor before election
Gordon Browning
Democratic
Elected Governor
Frank G. Clement
Democratic

The 1952 Tennessee gubernatorial election was held on November 4, 1952, to elect the next governor of Tennessee. Incumbent Democratic governor, Gordon Browning was defeated in the primary by Frank G. Clement. In the general election, Clement defeated Republican nominee R. Beecher Witt with 79.4% of the vote.

In the primary election, Clement derided Governor Browning as "dishonest, indecent, and immoral," and criticized the state's purchase of an expensive office building in Nashville. Browning, nearly twice Clement's age, struggled to adapt to the new medium of television. He lost to Clement in the primary, 302,491 votes to 245,166.

== Primary elections ==
Primary elections were held on August 7, 1952.

=== Democratic primary ===
==== Candidates ====
- Frank G. Clement, attorney
- Gordon Browning, incumbent governor
- Clifford Allen, State Senator
- Clifford Pierce

==== Results ====
Democratic primary results
Party	Candidate	Votes	%
Democratic	Frank G. Clement	302,491	46.74%
Democratic	Gordon Browning (incumbent)	245,166	37.89%
Democratic	Clifford Allen	75,269	11.63%
Democratic	Clifford Pierce	24,191	3.74%
Total votes		647,117	100.00%

== General election ==
=== Candidates ===
- Frank G. Clement, Democratic
- R. Beecher Witt, Republican

=== Results ===
1952 Tennessee gubernatorial election
Party	Candidate	Votes	%	±%
Democratic	Frank G. Clement	640,290	79.37%	
Republican	R. Beecher Witt	166,377	20.62%	
		104	0.01%	
Majority		473,913		
Turnout		806,771		
Democratic hold		Swing		

== See also ==
- 1952 United States Senate election in Tennessee
- 1952 United States presidential election in Tennessee
