= 1964 United States Senate election in Tennessee =

- November 3, 1964

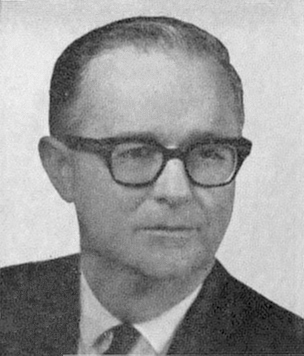
Nominee	Albert Gore Sr.	Dan Kuykendall
Party	Democratic	Republican
Popular vote	570,542	493,475
Percentage	53.62%	46.38%
- County results Gore: 50–60% 60–70% 70–80% 80–90% Kuykendall: 50–60% 60–70% 70–80%
U.S. senator before election
Albert Gore Sr.
Democratic
Elected U.S. senator
Albert Gore Sr.
Democratic

The 1964 United States Senate election in Tennessee was held on November 3, 1964, concurrently with the U.S. presidential election as well the other U.S. Senate special election in Tennessee, as well as other elections to the United States Senate in other states as well as elections to the United States House of Representatives and various state and local elections.

Democrat Albert Gore Sr. won re-election to a third term. Gore defeated Republican Dan Kuykendall.

== Democratic primary ==
=== Candidates ===
- Sam Galloway
- Albert Gore Sr., incumbent U.S. Senator
- W. N. McKinney
- Charles Gordon Vick, perennial candidate

21.4% of the voting age population participated in the Democratic primary.

=== Results ===
1964 Democratic Senate primary
Party	Candidate	Votes	%
Democratic	Albert Gore Sr. (incumbent)	401,163	84.67%
Democratic	Sam Galloway	37,974	8.02%
Democratic	W. N. McKinney	21,414	4.52%
Democratic	Charles Gordon Vick	11,059	2.33%

== Republican primary ==
Dan Kuykendall was unopposed.

== General election ==
=== Results ===
1964 U.S. Senate election in Tennessee
Party	Candidate	Votes	%	±%
Democratic	Albert Gore Sr. (incumbent)	570,542	53.62%	▼25.38
Republican	Dan Kuykendall	493,475	46.38%	▲27.37
Total votes		1,064,017	100.00%	N/A
Democratic hold				

== See also ==
- 1964 United States Senate elections

== Works cited ==
- Steed, Robert; Moreland, Laurence; Baker, Tod, eds. (1980). Party Politics in the South. Praeger Publishers. ISBN 0030565863.
