= 1952 United States Senate election in Tennessee =

- November 4, 1952
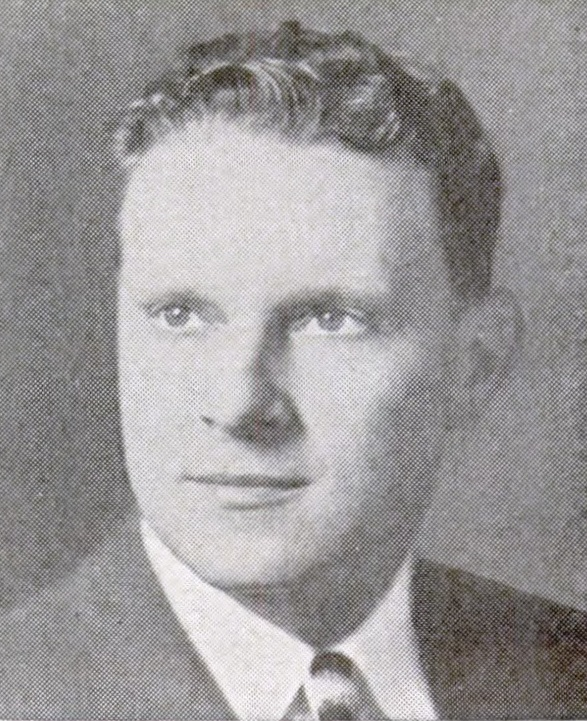

| Nominee | Albert Gore Sr. | Hobart F. Atkins |
| Party | Democratic | Republican |
| Popular vote | 545,432 | 153,479 |
| Percentage | 74.19% | 20.88% |
- County results Gore: 40–50% 50–60% 60–70% 70–80% 80–90% >90% Atkins: 50–60% 60–70% 70–80%
U.S. senator before election
Kenneth McKellar
Democratic
Elected U.S. senator
Albert Gore Sr.
Democratic

The 1952 United States Senate election in Tennessee was held on November 4, 1952. Incumbent Democratic Senator and President pro tempore of the Senate Kenneth D. McKellar ran for re-election to a seventh term in office but was defeated in the Democratic primary by U.S. Representative Al Gore Sr. Gore easily won the general election against Republican Hobart Atkins.

In the primary, Incumbent Senator McKellar stood for a seventh term (the first Senator to do so), despite being 83. He was opposed for renomination by Middle Tennessee Congressman Albert Gore. McKellar's re-election slogan was "Thinking Feller? Vote McKellar," which Gore countered with "Think Some More – Vote for Gore." Gore defeated McKellar for the Democratic nomination in August in what was widely regarded as an upset.

McKellar's defeat was part of a statewide trend of change in 1952. That year, the incumbent governor, Gordon Browning, was defeated by Frank G. Clement in the primary.

== Democratic primary ==
=== Candidates ===
- Kenneth McKellar, incumbent Senator since 1917 and President pro tempore of the U.S. Senate
- Albert Gore Sr., U.S. Representative from Carthage
- John Randolph Neal Jr., attorney, academic, and perennial candidate
- Herman H. Ross, independent candidate for Senate in 1946

=== Results ===
1952 Democratic Senate primary
| Party | Candidate | Votes | % |
|---|---|---|---|
| Democratic | Albert Gore Sr. | 334,957 | 56.54% |
| Democratic | Kenneth McKellar (incumbent) | 245,054 | 41.36% |
| Democratic | John Randolph Neal Jr. | 7,181 | 1.21% |
| Democratic | Herman H. Ross | 4,950 | 0.84% |
| Democratic | James Patrick Sutton (write-in) | 293 | 0.05% |
| Total votes | | 592,435 | 100.00% |

== General election ==
=== Candidates ===
- Hobart F. Atkins, nominee for Senate in 1952 (Republican)
- Richard M. Barber (Independent)
- Albert Gore Sr., incumbent Senator since 1953 (Democratic)
- John Randolph Neal Jr., attorney, academic, and perennial candidate (Good Government & Clean Elections)

=== Results ===
1952 U.S. Senate election in Tennessee
| Party | Candidate | Votes | % | ±% |
|---|---|---|---|---|
| Democratic | Albert Gore Sr. | 545,432 | 74.19% | ▲7.59 |
| Republican | Hobart F. Atkins | 153,479 | 20.88% | ▼5.29 |
| Independent | Richard M. Barber | 22,169 | 3.02% | N/A |
| Independent | John Randolph Neal Jr. | 14,132 | 1.92% | ▼3.35 |
| Total votes | | 735,219 | 100.00% | N/A |
| Democratic hold | | | | |

== See also ==
- 1952 United States Senate elections
- 1952 United States presidential election in Tennessee
- 1952 Tennessee gubernatorial election
