= 1970 United States Senate election in Tennessee =

- November 3, 1970
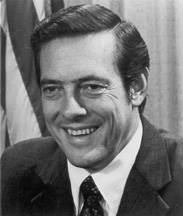

Nominee	Bill Brock	Albert Gore Sr.
Party	Republican	Democratic
Popular vote	562,645	519,858
Percentage	51.29%	47.39%
- County results Brock: 50–60% 60–70% 70–80% 80–90% Gore: 50–60% 60–70% 70–80% 80–90%
U.S. senator before election
Albert Gore Sr.
Democratic
Elected U.S. Senator
Bill Brock
Republican

The 1970 United States Senate election in Tennessee was held on November 3, 1970. Republican Bill Brock defeated Democratic incumbent Albert Gore, Sr. who ran for a fourth term. With Brock's victory, Republicans held both of Tennessee's U.S. Senate seats, marking the first time Republicans held both Senate seats in a former Confederate State since Reconstruction. He was also the first Republican to hold this seat since 1875.

== Primary ==
=== Republican ===
9.8% of the voting age population participated in the Republican primary.

=== Democratic ===
21.9% of the voting age population participated in the Democratic primary.

== Major candidates ==
=== Democratic ===
- Albert Gore, Sr., Incumbent U.S. Senator since 1953

=== Republican ===
- Bill Brock, U.S. Representative
- Tex Ritter, country singer
- J. Durelle Boles

1970 Republican Senate primary
Party	Candidate	Votes	%
Republican	Bill Brock	176,073	74.86%
Republican	Tex Ritter	54,401	23.05%
Republican	J. Durelle Boles	4,942	2.09%

== Results ==
1970 United States Senate election in Tennessee
Party	Candidate	Votes	%
Republican	Bill Brock	562,645	51.29
Democratic	Albert Gore Sr. (Incumbent)	519,858	47.39
American Independent	Cecil Pitard	8,691	0.79
Independent	Dan R. East	5,845	0.53
None	Scattering	2	0.00
Majority		42,787	3.90
Turnout		1,097,041	
Republican hold			

== See also ==
- 1970 United States Senate elections
- 1970 Tennessee gubernatorial election

== Works cited ==
- Steed, Robert; Moreland, Laurence; Baker, Tod, eds. (1980). Party Politics in the South. Praeger Publishers. ISBN 0030565863.
