= 1958 United States Senate election in Tennessee =

- November 4, 1958
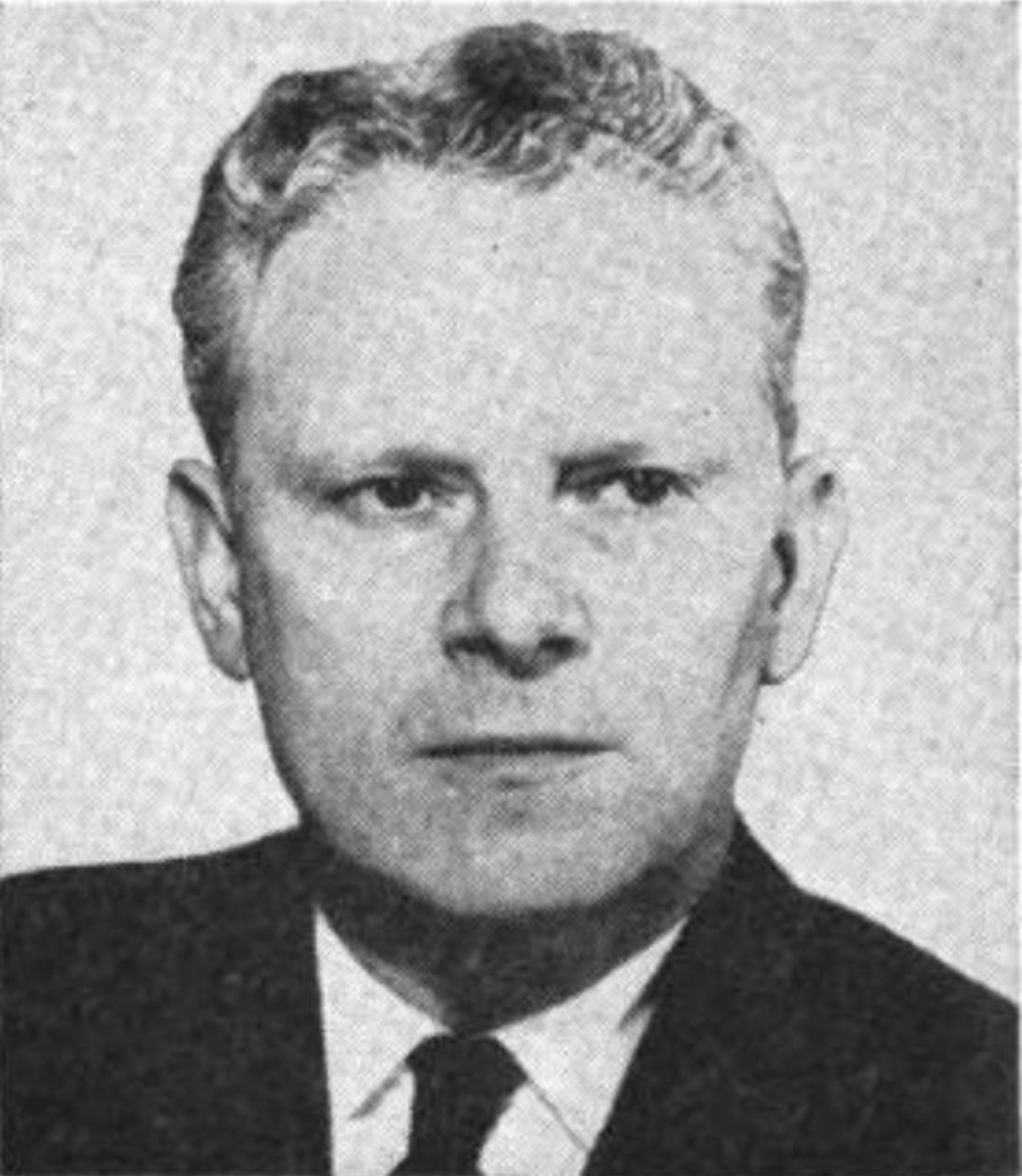

Nominee	Albert Gore Sr.	Hobart F. Atkins
Party	Democratic	Republican
Popular vote	317,324	76,371
Percentage	79.00%	19.01%
- County results Gore: 40–50% 50–60% 60–70% 70–80% 80–90% >90% Atkins: 50–60%
U.S. senator before election
Albert Gore Sr.
Democratic
Elected U.S. senator
Albert Gore Sr.
Democratic

The 1958 United States Senate election in Tennessee was held on November 4, 1958. Democrat Albert Gore Sr. was re-elected to a second term. Gore survived a primary challenge from former Governor Prentice Cooper and easily defeated Republican Hobart Atkins in the general election.

== Democratic primary ==
=== Candidates ===
- Prentice Cooper, former Governor of Tennessee and U.S. Ambassador to Peru
- Albert Gore Sr., incumbent U.S. Senator since 1953
- Robert C. Gregory

30.8% of the voting age population participated in the Democratic primary.

=== Results ===
1958 Democratic Senate primary
Party	Candidate	Votes	%
Democratic	Albert Gore Sr. (incumbent)	375,439	59.00%
Democratic	Prentice Cooper	253,191	39.79%
Democratic	Robert C. Gregory	7,711	1.21%
Total votes		636,331	100.00%

== General election ==
=== Candidates ===
- Hobart F. Atkins, nominee for Senate in 1952 (Republican)
- Albert Gore Sr., incumbent Senator since 1953 (Democratic)
- Thomas Gouge (Wheat in Bread)
- Chester W. Mason (Independent)

=== Results ===
1958 U.S. Senate election in Tennessee
Party	Candidate	Votes	%	±%
Democratic	Albert Gore Sr. (incumbent)	317,324	79.00%	▲4.81
Republican	Hobart F. Atkins	76,371	19.01%	▼1.87
Independent	Chester W. Mason	5,324	1.33%	N/A
Independent	Thomas Gouge	2,646	0.66%	N/A
Total votes		401,665	100.00%	N/A
Democratic hold				

== See also ==
- 1958 United States Senate elections

== Works cited ==
- Steed, Robert; Moreland, Laurence; Baker, Tod, eds. (1980). Party Politics in the South. Praeger Publishers. ISBN 0030565863.
