= Albert Gore Sr. =

American politician (1907–1998)

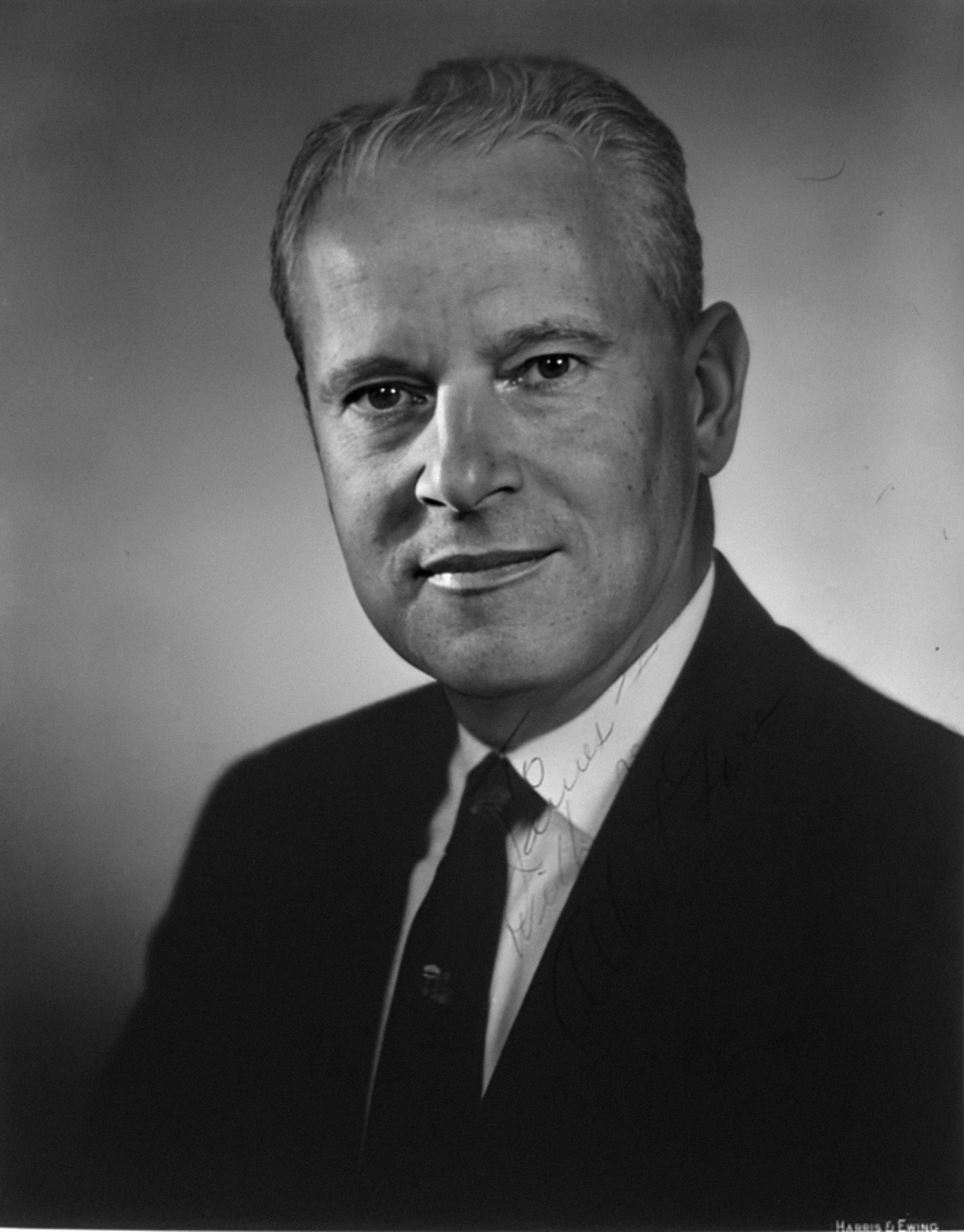
- Official portrait, c. 1953

United States Senator from Tennessee
- In office January 3, 1953 – January 3, 1971
- Preceded by: Kenneth McKellar
- Succeeded by: Bill Brock

Member of the U.S. House of Representatives from Tennessee's 4th district
- In office January 3, 1945 – January 3, 1953
- Preceded by: Himself
- Succeeded by: Joe L. Evins
- In office January 3, 1939 – December 4, 1944
- Preceded by: John Ridley Mitchell
- Succeeded by: Himself

Personal details
- Born: Albert Arnold Gore; December 26, 1907 Granville, Tennessee, U.S.
- Died: December 5, 1998 (aged 90) Carthage, Tennessee, U.S.
- Party: Democratic
- Spouse: Pauline LaFon (m. 1937)
- Children: 2, including Albert Jr.
- Education: Middle Tennessee State University (BA); Nashville School of Law (LLB)

Military service
- Allegiance: United States
- Branch/service: United States Army
- Years of service: 1944–1945
- Rank: Private
- Unit: Allied Military Government for Occupied Territories
- Battles/wars: World War II

Albert Arnold Gore Sr. (December 26, 1907 – December 5, 1998) was an American politician who served as a United States senator from Tennessee from 1953 to 1971. A member of the Democratic Party, he previously served as a U.S. representative from the state's 4th congressional district from 1939 to 1953. He was the father of Al Gore, who served as the 45th vice president of the United States from 1993 until 2001, and who held Tennessee's other U.S. Senate seat from 1985 to 1993. A native of Granville, Tennessee, Gore graduated from Middle Tennessee State Teachers College and taught school. From 1932 to 1936 he was superintendent of schools for Smith County. He attended the Nashville Y.M.C.A. Night Law School, now the Nashville School of Law, from which he graduated in 1936.

He was admitted to the bar later that year, and also accepted appointment as Commissioner of the Tennessee Department of Labor, a position he held until 1937. In 1938, Gore was elected to the United States House of Representatives from Tennessee's 4th congressional district. He was twice re-elected, and served from 1939 until resigning in December 1944. During World War II, Gore briefly served in the United States Army as part of a program that enabled members of Congress to join the military incognito to obtain firsthand information on training, readiness, and treatment of service members. He served from December 1944 to March 1945, when he was discharged and took the House seat to which he had been elected again in November 1944. He was thereafter re-elected in 1946, 1948, and 1950, and served from 1945 until 1953. In 1952, Gore was a successful candidate for the U.S. Senate. He was reelected in 1958 and 1964, and served from January 1953 to January 1971. Gore was an unsuccessful candidate for reelection in 1970.

In the Senate, Gore championed the Federal Aid Highway Act of 1956. In 1956, he also opposed the segregationist Southern Manifesto, but he voted against the Civil Rights Act of 1964. Gore reversed course a year later and supported the Voting Rights Act of 1965. During the presidency of Lyndon Johnson, Gore backed most of Johnson's Great Society programs. Gore's 1970 defeat was blamed in part on his opposition to continuing U.S. involvement in the Vietnam War. After leaving the Senate, Gore practiced and taught law at Vanderbilt University. He later served as a vice president of the Occidental Petroleum Company and was a member of its board of directors. Gore also served on the boards of directors of several other companies and operated a farm on which he bred Angus cattle. Gore died at the age of 90 in Carthage, Tennessee on December 5, 1998, and is buried at Carthage's Smith County Memorial Gardens.

== Early years ==
Gore was born in Granville, Tennessee, in 1907, the third of five children of Margie Bettie (née Denny) and Allen Arnold Gore. Gore's ancestors included Anglo-Irish immigrants who first settled in Virginia in the mid-18th century and moved to Tennessee after the American Revolutionary War. (Note: During a December 1987 interview with Playboy, Gore Vidal, a maternal grandson of Thomas Gore suggested that Albert Gore was of German descent, rather than Scots-Irish. Vidal believed that Albert Gore was his sixth or seventh cousin.) As teenagers, Allen Gore and Cordell Hull were friends.

Gore studied at Middle Tennessee State Teachers College, and taught school in Overton and Smith Counties from 1926 to 1930. He first sought elective public office at age 23, when he ran unsuccessfully for superintendent of schools in Smith County. A year later, he was appointed to the position following the death of the incumbent. Gore graduated from the Nashville Y.M.C.A. Night Law School, now the Nashville School of Law, in 1936 and attained admission to the bar.

== Congressional career ==
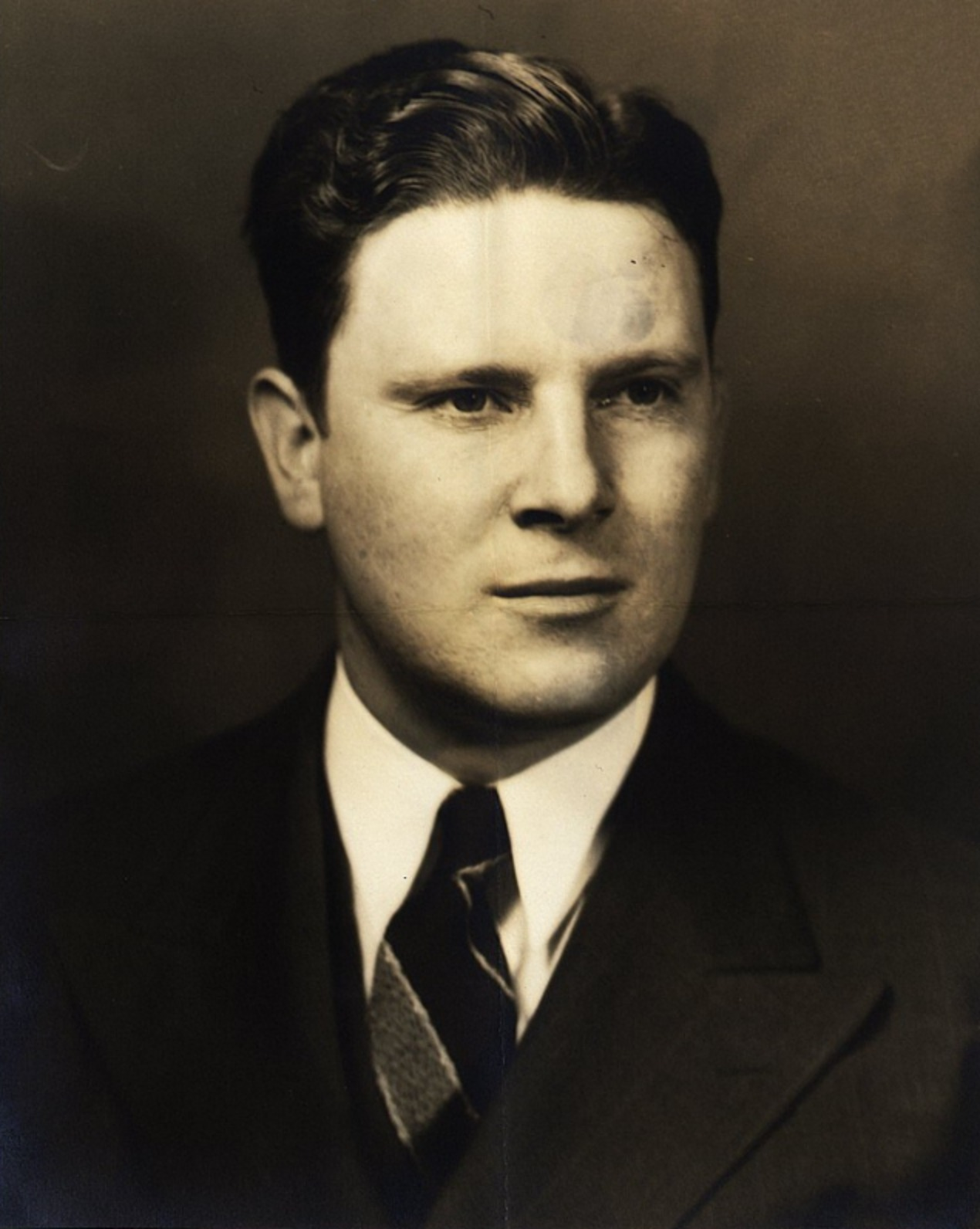
Gore in 1939

After serving as Commissioner of the Tennessee Department of Labor from 1936 to 1937, Gore was elected as a Democrat to the 76th Congress in 1938, re-elected to the two succeeding Congresses, and served from January 3, 1939, until he resigned on December 4, 1944, to enter the U.S. Army.

=== Military service ===
Gore was one of several members of Congress who joined the military incognito for short tours, in order to observe training and combat and provide first-hand reports to the U.S. House and Senate. He completed basic training at Fort Meade, Maryland, after which he was assigned to the Allied Military Government for Occupied Territories in Germany as a prosecutor in one of the military government courts. Gore served as a private and was discharged in March 1945 so he could take the seat in the U.S. House to which he had been reelected in November 1944.

Gore was re-elected to the 79th and to the three succeeding Congresses (January 3, 1945, to January 3, 1953). In 1951, Gore proposed in Congress that "something cataclysmic" be done by U.S. forces to end the Korean War: a radiation belt (created by nuclear weapons) dividing the Korean peninsula permanently into two.

=== U.S. Senate ===
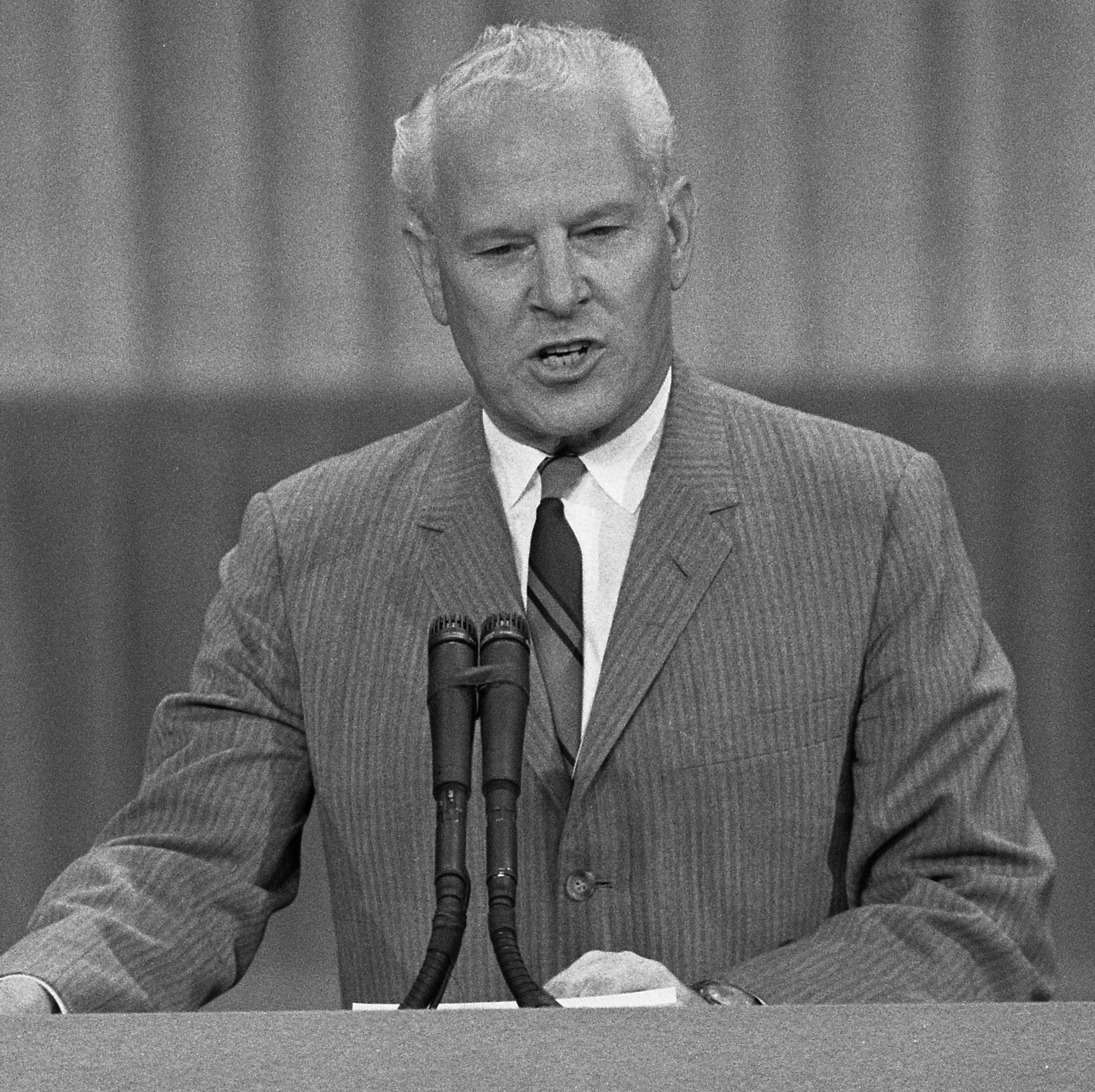
Gore speaking at the 1968 Democratic National Convention

In 1952, Gore was not a candidate for House re-election but was elected to the U.S. Senate. In his 1952 election, he defeated six-term incumbent Kenneth McKellar in the Democratic primary. Gore's victory is widely regarded as a major turning point in Tennessee political history, largely marking the end of statewide influence for E. H. Crump, the Memphis political boss. During his first term, Gore was instrumental in sponsoring and enacting the legislation creating the Interstate Highway System. Gore was re-elected in 1958 and again in 1964, but lost reelection in 1970.

Gore was one of only three Democratic senators from the former Confederate states who did not sign the 1956 Southern Manifesto opposing integration, the others being Senate Majority Leader Lyndon B. Johnson of Texas (who was not asked to sign), and Tennessee's other Senator, Estes Kefauver. South Carolina Senator Strom Thurmond tried to get Gore to sign the Manifesto, but Gore refused. Gore voted in favor of the Civil Rights Acts of 1960 and 1968, as well as the Voting Rights Act of 1965 and the confirmation of Thurgood Marshall to the Supreme Court. Gore voted in favor of the initial Senate resolution on the Civil Rights Act of 1957 on August 7, 1957, but did not vote on House amendment to bill on August 29, 1957. Gore also did not vote on the 24th Amendment to the U.S. Constitution, and Gore voted against the Civil Rights Act of 1964.

Gore easily won renomination in 1958 over former governor Prentice Cooper. At the time, the Democratic nomination was still considered tantamount to election in Tennessee, since the Republican Party was largely nonexistent in many parts of the state. In 1964, he faced an energetic general election challenge from Dan Kuykendall, chairman of the Shelby County Republican Party, who ran a surprisingly strong race against him. While Gore won, Kuykendall held him to only 53 percent of the vote, in spite of President Lyndon Johnson's landslide victory in the concurrent presidential election.

=== 1970 campaign and defeat ===
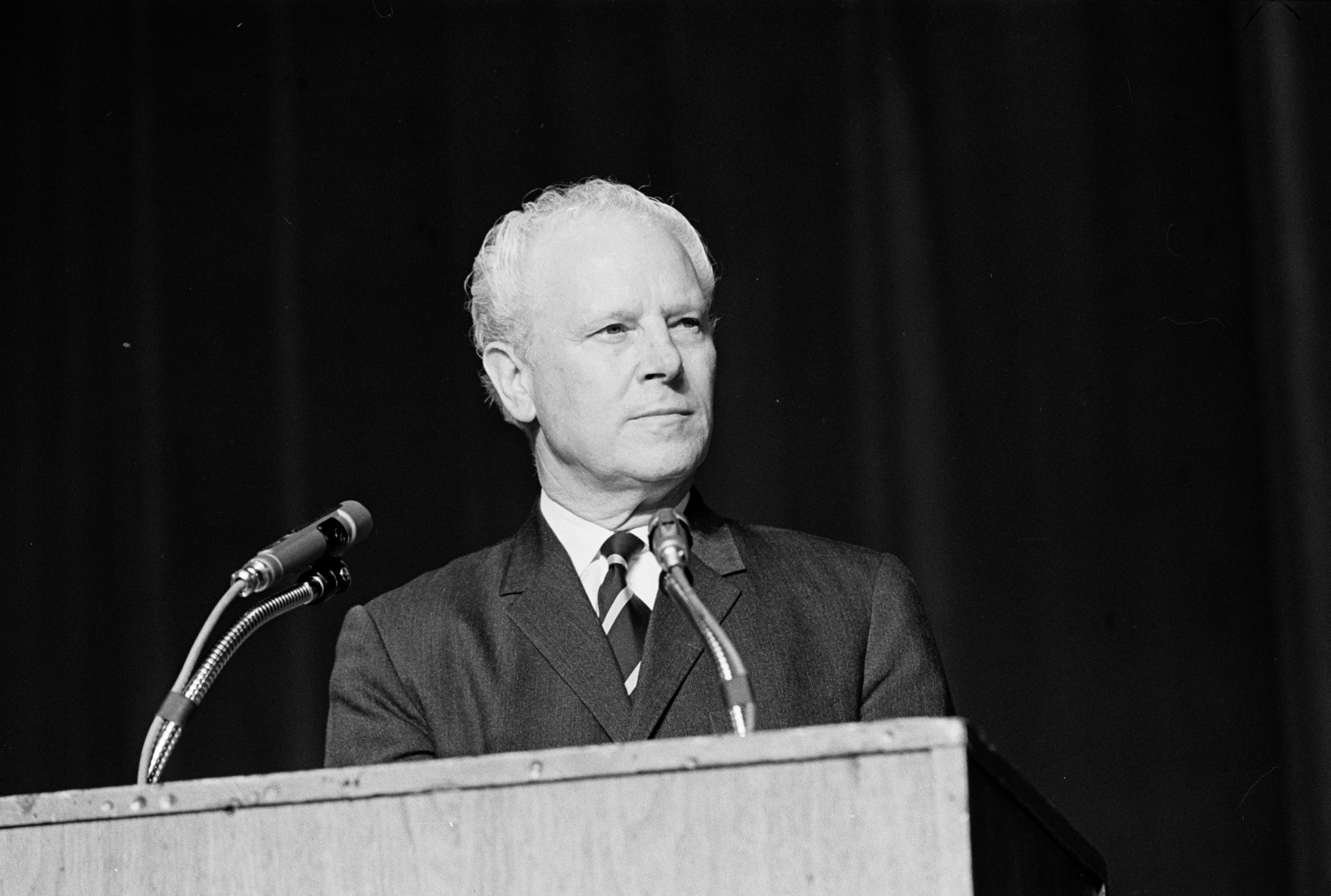
Gore speaking at an anti-Safeguard Program rally in Madison Square Garden, June 25, 1969

By 1970, Gore was considered to be fairly vulnerable for a three-term incumbent Senator, as a result of his liberal positions on many issues such as the Vietnam War (which he opposed) and civil rights. This was especially risky, electorally, as at the time the Republican Party was becoming more competitive in Tennessee. He faced a spirited primary challenge, predominantly from former Nashville news anchor Hudley Crockett, who used his broadcasting skills to considerable advantage and generally attempted to run to Gore's right. Gore fended off this primary challenge, but he was ultimately unseated in the 1970 general election by Republican congressman Bill Brock. Gore was one of the key targets in the Nixon/Agnew "Southern strategy." He had earned Nixon's ire the year before when he criticized the administration's "do-nothing" policy toward inflation. In a memo to senior advisor Bryce Harlow, Nixon aide Alexander Butterfield relayed the President's desire that Gore be "blistered" for his comment. Spiro T. Agnew traveled to Tennessee in 1970 to mock Gore as the "Southern regional chairman of the Eastern Liberal Establishment". Other prominent issues in the race included Gore's vote against Everett Dirksen's amendment on prayer in public schools, and his opposition to appointing Clement Haynsworth and G. Harrold Carswell to the U.S. Supreme Court. Brock won the election by a 51% to 47% margin.

=== Political legacy ===
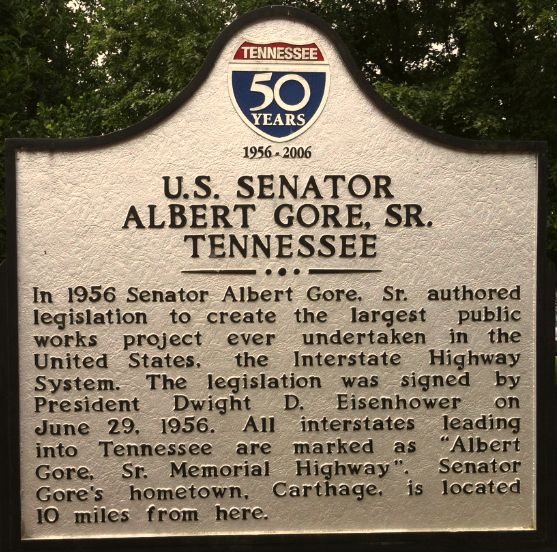
Plaque honoring Al Gore Sr. at a rest area along Interstate 40 in Tennessee

In 1956, he gained national attention after his disapproval of the Southern Manifesto. Gore voted against the Civil Rights Act of 1964, in fact filibustering against it, although he supported the Voting Rights Act of 1965. Gore was a vocal champion of the Federal Aid Highway Act of 1956, which secured creation of interstate highways. Later, he backed the Great Society array of programs initiated by President Johnson's administration, and introduced a bill with a Medicare blueprint. In international politics, he moved from proposing in the House to employ nuclear weapons for establishing a radioactive demilitarized zone during the Korean War, to voting for the Partial Nuclear Test Ban Treaty and speaking against the Vietnam War, pivots that likely contributed to the loss of his Senate seat in 1970.

== Personal life ==
On May 15, 1937, in Tompkinsville, Kentucky, Gore married lawyer Pauline LaFon (1912–2004), the daughter of Maude (née Gatlin) and Walter L. LaFon. Together, they had two children: Nancy LaFon Gore (1938–1984) and Albert Gore Jr. (born 1948), who followed in his father's political footsteps by representing Tennessee as a U.S. representative and as a senator, and later served as Vice President of the United States under Bill Clinton.

After leaving Congress, Gore Sr. resumed the practice of law and also taught law at Vanderbilt University. He continued to represent Occidental Petroleum, where he became vice president and member of the board of directors. Gore became chairman of Island Creek Coal Co., Lexington, Kentucky, an Occidental subsidiary, in 1972, and in his last years operated Gore Antique Mall, an antiques store in Carthage. He lived to see his son Albert Gore Jr. become Vice President of the United States. Gore Sr. died on December 5, 1998, at the age of 90 and is buried in Smith County Memorial Gardens in Carthage. The Interstate Highway System in Tennessee is designated the "Senator Albert Gore Sr. Memorial Interstate System" in his honor.

== Bibliography ==
- Badger, Anthony J. (2019). Albert Gore Sr.: A Political Life. Philadelphia: University of Pennsylvania Press. ISBN 978-0-8122-5072-5.
- Longley, Kyle (2004). Senator Albert Gore Sr.: Tennessee Maverick. Baton Rouge, LA: Louisiana State University Press. ISBN 978-0807129807.
- Turque, Bill (2000). Inventing Al Gore. Houghton Mifflin Harcourt. ISBN 0-618-13160-4.

U.S. House of Representatives
Preceded by John R. Mitchell	Member of the U.S. House of Representatives from Tennessee's 4th congressional district 1939–1953	Succeeded by Joe L. Evins
Party political offices
Preceded by Kenneth McKellar	Democratic nominee for U.S. Senator from Tennessee (Class 1); 1952, 1958, 1964, 1970	Succeeded by Jim Sasser
U.S. Senate
Preceded by Kenneth McKellar	U.S. Senator (Class 1) from Tennessee; 1953–1971; Served alongside: Estes Kefauver, Herbert S. Walters, Ross Bass, Howard Baker	Succeeded by Bill Brock
New office	Chair of the Senate Attempts to Influence Senators Committee; 1955–1957	Position abolished
