= Clifford Davis (politician) =

American politician (1897–1970)

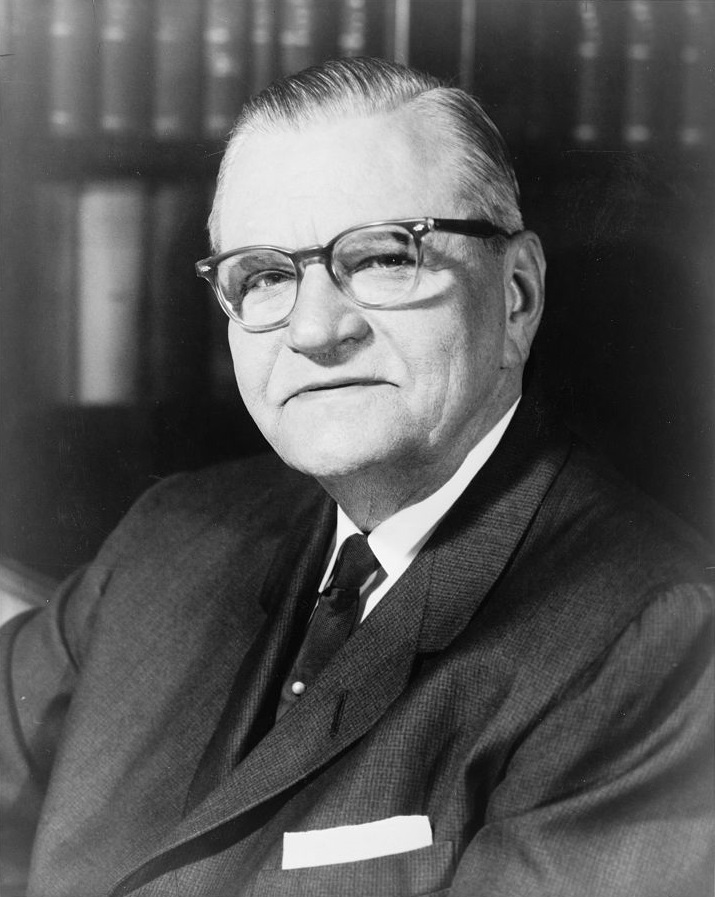
- Davis in 1962

Member of the U.S. House of Representatives from Tennessee
- In office February 14, 1940 – January 3, 1965
- Preceded by: Clift Chandler
- Succeeded by: George W. Grider
- Constituency: 9th district (1940–1943); 10th district (1943–1953); 9th district (1953–1965)

Personal details
- Born: November 18, 1897 Hazlehurst, Mississippi, U.S.
- Died: June 8, 1970 (aged 72) Washington, D.C., U.S.
- Resting place: Forest Hill Cemetery
- Party: Democratic
- Education: University of Mississippi (LLB)

Clifford Davis (November 18, 1897 – June 8, 1970) was a Democratic U.S. representative from Tennessee from 1940 to 1965.

== Early life ==
Davis was born on November 18, 1897, in Hazlehurst, Mississippi, moving to Memphis with his parents in 1911. There he completed the high school curriculum of the public schools, and in 1918 he completed law school at the University of Mississippi. In 1918 he was admitted to the Tennessee bar.

== Public service ==
In 1923, Davis became a city judge in Memphis, serving in this post until 1927. From 1928 until 1940, Davis served as vice mayor and Commissioner of Public Safety. He became a close associate of Memphis political "boss" E. H. Crump. Davis was a leader of the Ku Klux Klan. The result was relatively unquestioned violence against black residents of Memphis.

== Congress ==
In 1940, the seat for the 10th Congressional District, which included Memphis, came open after three-term incumbent Clift Chandler was elected mayor of Memphis. Crump arranged for his colleague Davis to receive the Democratic nomination for the post. In those days, the Democratic nomination was tantamount to election in most of Tennessee (except for heavily Republican East Tennessee). Davis won the special election and took office on February 15, 1940. Davis was elected to a full term in November of that year and was reelected eleven times. His district was renumbered as the 9th District after Tennessee lost a district in the 1950 census.

Crump died in 1954, but many of his supporters remained in office for years afterwards. In fact, Davis was re-elected five times after Crump's death. During this time, Davis served as chairman of the House Special Committee on Campaign Expenditures, a group which was charged with attempting to find a legal way to control the influence of money on politics and looked into the beginning of what became, many years later, became the system of campaign finance reform that started to be implemented after the Watergate scandal.

Davis was one of five Representatives shot on March 1, 1954, when four Puerto Rican nationalists opened fire from the visitors' balcony into the chamber of the United States House of Representatives. Davis was shot in the leg, but was not seriously wounded.

He was a signatory to the 1956 Southern Manifesto that opposed the desegregation of public schools ordered by the Supreme Court in Brown v. Board of Education.

During his time in Congress, Davis developed a mainly liberal voting record.

== Defeat ==
The Memphis area became much friendlier to Republicans in the 1960s, in part due to a massive crossover of white voters from the Democrats. As evidence of this growing influence, Davis barely held onto his seat in 1962, defeating his Republican challenger, former city councilman Robert James, by only 1,200 votes. This was particularly shocking considering that he had been unopposed for reelection two years earlier.

In 1964, Davis lost the August Democratic primary to Shelby County legislator George W. Grider, a retired naval officer and fellow attorney. Unlike Davis, Grider had no past ties to the Crump machine. Davis did not return to Memphis full-time, but maintained a residence in Washington, D.C. where he resumed the practice of law until his death.

Davis died on June 8, 1970, in Washington, D.C. He was buried at Forest Hill Cemetery in Memphis.

== Legacy ==
The Clifford Davis Federal Building in Memphis was named after him. It was designated as the "Clifford Davis and Odell Horton Federal Building." On December 9, 2021, the U.S. Senate voted to remove Clifford Davis' name from the Federal Building in Memphis due to his ties to the Ku Klux Klan.

== See also ==
- List of members of the United States Congress killed or wounded in office

== Sources ==
- United States Congress. "Clifford Davis (id: D000094)". Biographical Directory of the United States Congress.

U.S. House of Representatives
Preceded by Clift Chandler	Member of the U.S. House of Representatives from Tennessee's 9th congressional district 1940–1943	Succeeded by Jere Cooper
Preceded by E. H. Crump	Member of the U.S. House of Representatives from Tennessee's 10th congressional district 1943–1953	Constituency abolished
Preceded by George Grider	Member of the U.S. House of Representatives from Tennessee's 9th congressional district 1953–1965	Succeeded by Jere Cooper
