= List of United States senators from Tennessee =

Current delegation

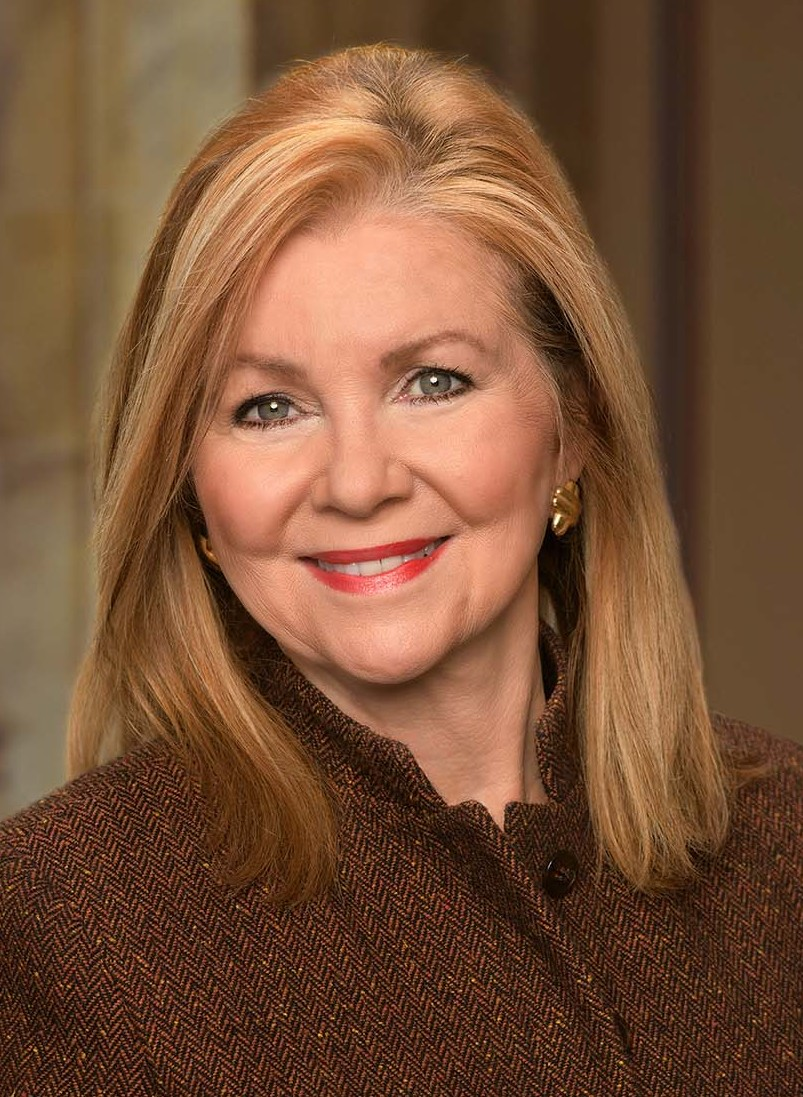
Marsha Blackburn (R)

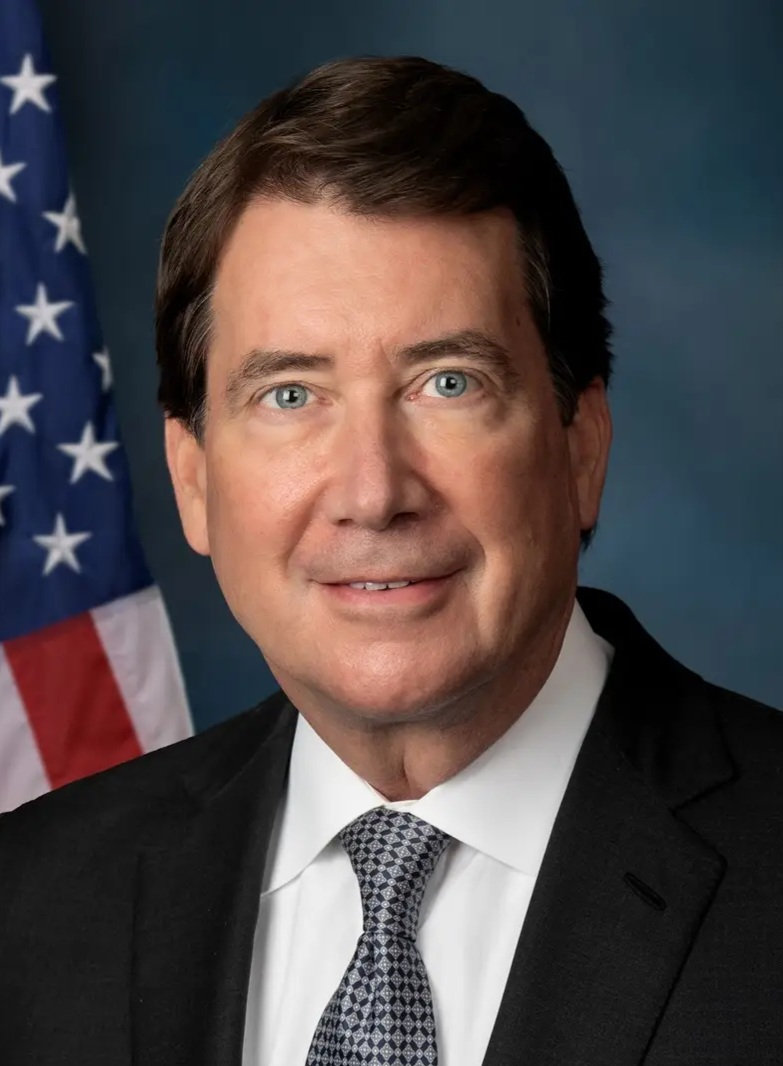
Bill Hagerty (R)

(ordered by seniority)

Tennessee was admitted to the Union on June 1, 1796. Its United States Senate seats were declared vacant in March 1862 owing to its secession from the Union. They were again filled from July 1866. Tennessee's current senators are Republicans Marsha Blackburn (since 2019) and Bill Hagerty (since 2021). Kenneth McKellar was Tennessee's longest-serving senator (1917–1953).

== List of senators ==
Class 1 Class 1 senators belong to the electoral cycle that most recently had regular elections in 2006, 2012, 2018, and 2024. The next election will be in 2030.						C	Class 2 Class 2 senators belong to the electoral cycle that most recently had regular elections in 2008, 2014, 2020, and 2026. The next election will be in 2032.					
#	Senator	Party	Dates in office	Electoral history	T	C	T	Electoral history	Dates in office	Party	Senator	#
Vacant			Jun 1, 1796 – Aug 2, 1796	Tennessee did not elect its senators until two months after statehood.	1	4th	1	Tennessee did not elect its senators until two months after statehood.	Jun 1, 1796 – Aug 2, 1796	Vacant		
1	William Cocke (Mulberry Grove)	Democratic-Republican	Aug 2, 1796 – Sep 26, 1797	Elected in 1796.	1	4th	1	Elected in 1796. Expelled for conspiracy with the Kingdom of Great Britain.	Aug 2, 1796 – Jul 8, 1797	Democratic-Republican	William Blount (Knoxville)	1
1	William Cocke (Mulberry Grove)	Democratic-Republican	Aug 2, 1796 – Sep 26, 1797	Appointed to begin the term due to legislature's failure to elect. Lost re-election.	2	5th	1	Elected in 1796. Expelled for conspiracy with the Kingdom of Great Britain.	Aug 2, 1796 – Jul 8, 1797	Democratic-Republican	William Blount (Knoxville)	1
1	William Cocke (Mulberry Grove)	Democratic-Republican	Aug 2, 1796 – Sep 26, 1797	Appointed to begin the term due to legislature's failure to elect. Lost re-election.	2	5th	1		Jul 8, 1797 – Sep 26, 1797	Vacant		
2	Andrew Jackson (Nashville)	Democratic-Republican	Sep 26, 1797 – Apr 1, 1798	Elected to finish Cocke's term. Resigned.	2	5th	1	Elected to finish Blount's term. Resigned when elected to the class 1 seat.	Sep 26, 1797 – Mar 3, 1799	Democratic-Republican	Joseph Anderson (Soldier's Rest)	2
Vacant			Apr 1, 1798 – Oct 6, 1798		2	5th	1	Elected to finish Blount's term. Resigned when elected to the class 1 seat.	Sep 26, 1797 – Mar 3, 1799	Democratic-Republican	Joseph Anderson (Soldier's Rest)	2
3	Daniel Smith (Sumner County)	Democratic-Republican	Oct 6, 1798 – Mar 3, 1799	Appointed to finish Jackson's term. Retired.	2	5th	1	Elected to finish Blount's term. Resigned when elected to the class 1 seat.	Sep 26, 1797 – Mar 3, 1799	Democratic-Republican	Joseph Anderson (Soldier's Rest)	2
4	Joseph Anderson (Soldier's Rest)	Democratic-Republican	Mar 4, 1799 – Mar 3, 1803	Elected in 1798 to finish Jackson's term.	2	6th	2	Elected in 1798. Retired or lost re-election.	Mar 4, 1799 – Mar 3, 1805	Democratic-Republican	William Cocke (Mulberry Grove)	3
4	Joseph Anderson (Soldier's Rest)	Democratic-Republican	Mar 4, 1799 – Mar 3, 1803	Elected in 1798 to finish Jackson's term.	2	7th	2	Elected in 1798. Retired or lost re-election.	Mar 4, 1799 – Mar 3, 1805	Democratic-Republican	William Cocke (Mulberry Grove)	3
4	Vacant		Mar 4, 1803 – Sep 22, 1803	Legislature failed to elect.	3	8th	2	Elected in 1798. Retired or lost re-election.	Mar 4, 1799 – Mar 3, 1805	Democratic-Republican	William Cocke (Mulberry Grove)	3
4	Joseph Anderson (Soldier's Rest)	Democratic-Republican	Sep 22, 1803 – Mar 3, 1809	Re-elected late in 1803.	3	8th	2	Elected in 1798. Retired or lost re-election.	Mar 4, 1799 – Mar 3, 1805	Democratic-Republican	William Cocke (Mulberry Grove)	3
4	Joseph Anderson (Soldier's Rest)	Democratic-Republican	Sep 22, 1803 – Mar 3, 1809	Re-elected late in 1803.	3	9th	3	Elected early in 1803. Resigned.	Mar 4, 1805 – Mar 31, 1809	Democratic-Republican	Daniel Smith (Sumner County)	4
4	Joseph Anderson (Soldier's Rest)	Democratic-Republican	Sep 22, 1803 – Mar 3, 1809	Re-elected late in 1803.	3	10th	3	Elected early in 1803. Resigned.	Mar 4, 1805 – Mar 31, 1809	Democratic-Republican	Daniel Smith (Sumner County)	4
4	Joseph Anderson (Soldier's Rest)	Democratic-Republican	Mar 4, 1809 – Apr 11, 1809	Appointed to begin the term due to legislature's failure to elect.	4	11th	3	Elected early in 1803. Resigned.	Mar 4, 1805 – Mar 31, 1809	Democratic-Republican	Daniel Smith (Sumner County)	4
4	Joseph Anderson (Soldier's Rest)	Democratic-Republican	Mar 4, 1809 – Apr 11, 1809	Appointed to begin the term due to legislature's failure to elect.	4	11th	3		Apr 1, 1809 – Apr 11, 1809	Vacant		
4	Joseph Anderson (Soldier's Rest)	Democratic-Republican	Apr 11, 1809 – Mar 3, 1815	Re-elected late in 1809. Retired.	4	11th	3	Elected to finish Smith's term.	Apr 11, 1809 – Oct 8, 1811	Democratic-Republican	Jenkin Whiteside (Knoxville)	5
4	Joseph Anderson (Soldier's Rest)	Democratic-Republican	Apr 11, 1809 – Mar 3, 1815	Re-elected late in 1809. Retired.	4	12th	4	Re-elected early in 1809. Resigned.	Apr 11, 1809 – Oct 8, 1811	Democratic-Republican	Jenkin Whiteside (Knoxville)	5
4	Joseph Anderson (Soldier's Rest)	Democratic-Republican	Apr 11, 1809 – Mar 3, 1815	Re-elected late in 1809. Retired.	4	12th	4	Elected in 1811 to finish Whiteside's term. Resigned to become U.S. Secretary of the Treasury.	Oct 8, 1811 – Feb 11, 1814	Democratic-Republican	George W. Campbell (Nashville)	6
4	Joseph Anderson (Soldier's Rest)	Democratic-Republican	Apr 11, 1809 – Mar 3, 1815	Re-elected late in 1809. Retired.	4	13th	4	Elected in 1811 to finish Whiteside's term. Resigned to become U.S. Secretary of the Treasury.	Oct 8, 1811 – Feb 11, 1814	Democratic-Republican	George W. Campbell (Nashville)	6
4	Joseph Anderson (Soldier's Rest)	Democratic-Republican	Apr 11, 1809 – Mar 3, 1815	Re-elected late in 1809. Retired.	4	13th	4		Feb 12, 1814 – Mar 16, 1814	Vacant		
4	Joseph Anderson (Soldier's Rest)	Democratic-Republican	Apr 11, 1809 – Mar 3, 1815	Re-elected late in 1809. Retired.	4	13th	4	Appointed to continue Whiteside's term. Retired when his successor was elected.	Mar 17, 1814 – Oct 10, 1815	Democratic-Republican	Jesse Wharton (Nashville)	7
Vacant			Mar 4, 1815 – Oct 10, 1815		5	14th	4	Appointed to continue Whiteside's term. Retired when his successor was elected.	Mar 17, 1814 – Oct 10, 1815	Democratic-Republican	Jesse Wharton (Nashville)	7
5	George W. Campbell (Nashville)	Democratic-Republican	Oct 10, 1815 – Apr 20, 1818	Elected late in 1815. Resigned.	5	14th	4	Elected to finish Whiteside's term. Legislature failed to elect.	Oct 10, 1815 – Mar 3, 1823	Democratic-Republican	John Williams (Knoxville)	8
5	George W. Campbell (Nashville)	Democratic-Republican	Oct 10, 1815 – Apr 20, 1818	Elected late in 1815. Resigned.	5	15th	5	Appointed to begin the term. Elected in 1817 to finish the term. Lost re-election.	Oct 10, 1815 – Mar 3, 1823	Democratic-Republican	John Williams (Knoxville)	8
Vacant			Apr 20, 1818 – Sep 27, 1818		5	15th	5	Appointed to begin the term. Elected in 1817 to finish the term. Lost re-election.	Oct 10, 1815 – Mar 3, 1823	Democratic-Republican	John Williams (Knoxville)	8
6	John Eaton (Nashville)	Democratic-Republican	Sep 5, 1818 – Mar 4, 1821	Appointed to continue Campbell's term. Elected in 1819 to finish Campbell's term.	5	15th	5	Appointed to begin the term. Elected in 1817 to finish the term. Lost re-election.	Oct 10, 1815 – Mar 3, 1823	Democratic-Republican	John Williams (Knoxville)	8
6	John Eaton (Nashville)	Democratic-Republican	Sep 5, 1818 – Mar 4, 1821	Appointed to continue Campbell's term. Elected in 1819 to finish Campbell's term.	5	16th	5	Appointed to begin the term. Elected in 1817 to finish the term. Lost re-election.	Oct 10, 1815 – Mar 3, 1823	Democratic-Republican	John Williams (Knoxville)	8
6	Vacant		Mar 4, 1821 – Sep 27, 1821	Legislature failed to elect.	6	17th	5	Appointed to begin the term. Elected in 1817 to finish the term. Lost re-election.	Oct 10, 1815 – Mar 3, 1823	Democratic-Republican	John Williams (Knoxville)	8
6	John Eaton (Nashville)	Democratic-Republican	Sep 27, 1821 – Mar 9, 1829	Re-elected late in 1821.	6	17th	5	Appointed to begin the term. Elected in 1817 to finish the term. Lost re-election.	Oct 10, 1815 – Mar 3, 1823	Democratic-Republican	John Williams (Knoxville)	8
6	John Eaton (Nashville)	Democratic-Republican	Sep 27, 1821 – Mar 9, 1829	Re-elected late in 1821.	6	18th	6	Elected in 1823. Resigned.	Mar 4, 1823 – Oct 14, 1825	Democratic-Republican	Andrew Jackson (Nashville)	9
6	John Eaton (Nashville)	Jacksonian	Sep 27, 1821 – Mar 9, 1829	Re-elected late in 1821.	6	19th	6	Elected in 1823. Resigned.	Mar 4, 1823 – Oct 14, 1825	Jacksonian	Andrew Jackson (Nashville)	9
6	John Eaton (Nashville)	Jacksonian	Sep 27, 1821 – Mar 9, 1829	Re-elected late in 1821.	6	19th	6		Oct 15, 1825 – Oct 27, 1825	Vacant		
6	John Eaton (Nashville)	Jacksonian	Sep 27, 1821 – Mar 9, 1829	Re-elected late in 1821.	6	19th	6	Elected to finish Jackson's term.	Oct 28, 1825 – Jan 13, 1840	Jacksonian	Hugh Lawson White (Knoxville)	10
6	John Eaton (Nashville)	Jacksonian	Sep 27, 1821 – Mar 9, 1829	Re-elected in 1826. Resigned to become U.S. Secretary of War.	7	20th	6	Elected to finish Jackson's term.	Oct 28, 1825 – Jan 13, 1840	Jacksonian	Hugh Lawson White (Knoxville)	10
6	John Eaton (Nashville)	Jacksonian	Sep 27, 1821 – Mar 9, 1829	Re-elected in 1826. Resigned to become U.S. Secretary of War.	7	21st	7	Re-elected in 1829.	Oct 28, 1825 – Jan 13, 1840	Jacksonian	Hugh Lawson White (Knoxville)	10
Vacant			Mar 9, 1829 – Oct 19, 1829		7	21st	7	Re-elected in 1829.	Oct 28, 1825 – Jan 13, 1840	Jacksonian	Hugh Lawson White (Knoxville)	10
7	Felix Grundy (Nashville)	Jacksonian	Oct 19, 1829 – Jul 4, 1838	Elected to finish Eaton's term.	7	21st	7	Re-elected in 1829.	Oct 28, 1825 – Jan 13, 1840	Jacksonian	Hugh Lawson White (Knoxville)	10
7	Felix Grundy (Nashville)	Jacksonian	Oct 19, 1829 – Jul 4, 1838	Elected to finish Eaton's term.	7	22nd	7	Re-elected in 1829.	Oct 28, 1825 – Jan 13, 1840	Jacksonian	Hugh Lawson White (Knoxville)	10
7	Felix Grundy (Nashville)	Jacksonian	Oct 19, 1829 – Jul 4, 1838	Re-elected in 1833. Resigned to become U.S. Attorney General.	8	23rd	7	Re-elected in 1829.	Oct 28, 1825 – Jan 13, 1840	Jacksonian	Hugh Lawson White (Knoxville)	10
7	Felix Grundy (Nashville)	Jacksonian	Oct 19, 1829 – Jul 4, 1838	Re-elected in 1833. Resigned to become U.S. Attorney General.	8	24th	8	Re-elected in 1835. Resigned.	Oct 28, 1825 – Jan 13, 1840	National; Republican	Hugh Lawson White (Knoxville)	10
7	Felix Grundy (Nashville)	Democratic	Oct 19, 1829 – Jul 4, 1838	Re-elected in 1833. Resigned to become U.S. Attorney General.	8	25th	8	Re-elected in 1835. Resigned.	Oct 28, 1825 – Jan 13, 1840	Whig	Hugh Lawson White (Knoxville)	10
Vacant			Jul 5, 1838 – Sep 16, 1838		8	25th	8	Re-elected in 1835. Resigned.	Oct 28, 1825 – Jan 13, 1840	Whig	Hugh Lawson White (Knoxville)	10
8	Ephraim H. Foster (Nashville)	Whig	Sep 17, 1838 – Mar 3, 1839	Elected to finish Grundy's term. Re-elected but declined to serve the next term.	8	25th	8	Re-elected in 1835. Resigned.	Oct 28, 1825 – Jan 13, 1840	Whig	Hugh Lawson White (Knoxville)	10
Vacant			Mar 3, 1839 – Nov 19, 1839		9	26th	8	Re-elected in 1835. Resigned.	Oct 28, 1825 – Jan 13, 1840	Whig	Hugh Lawson White (Knoxville)	10
9	Felix Grundy (Nashville)	Democratic	Nov 19, 1839 – Dec 19, 1840	Elected late in 1839. Died.	9	26th	8	Re-elected in 1835. Resigned.	Oct 28, 1825 – Jan 13, 1840	Whig	Hugh Lawson White (Knoxville)	10
9	Felix Grundy (Nashville)	Democratic	Nov 19, 1839 – Dec 19, 1840	Elected late in 1839. Died.	9	26th	8		Jan 13, 1840 – Feb 25, 1840	Vacant		
9	Felix Grundy (Nashville)	Democratic	Nov 19, 1839 – Dec 19, 1840	Elected late in 1839. Died.	9	26th	8	Elected to finish White's term. Retired.	Feb 25, 1840 – Mar 3, 1841	Democratic	Alexander O. Anderson (Knoxville)	11
Vacant			Dec 19, 1840 – Dec 25, 1840		9	26th	8	Elected to finish White's term. Retired.	Feb 25, 1840 – Mar 3, 1841	Democratic	Alexander O. Anderson (Knoxville)	11
10	Alfred O. P. Nicholson (Columbia)	Democratic	Dec 25, 1840 – Feb 7, 1842	Appointed to continue Grundy's term. Resigned.	9	26th	8	Elected to finish White's term. Retired.	Feb 25, 1840 – Mar 3, 1841	Democratic	Alexander O. Anderson (Knoxville)	11
10	Alfred O. P. Nicholson (Columbia)	Democratic	Dec 25, 1840 – Feb 7, 1842	Appointed to continue Grundy's term. Resigned.	9	27th	9	Legislature failed to elect.	Mar 4, 1841 – Oct 17, 1843	Vacant		
Vacant			Feb 7, 1842 – Oct 17, 1843		9	27th	9	Legislature failed to elect.	Mar 4, 1841 – Oct 17, 1843	Vacant		
Vacant			Feb 7, 1842 – Oct 17, 1843		9	28th	9	Legislature failed to elect.	Mar 4, 1841 – Oct 17, 1843	Vacant		
11	Ephraim H. Foster (Nashville)	Whig	Oct 17, 1843 – Mar 3, 1845	Elected to finish Grundy's term. Retired or lost re-election.	9	28th	9	Elected to finish the vacant term. Lost re-election.	Oct 17, 1843 – Mar 3, 1847	Whig	Spencer Jarnagin (Athens)	12
12	Hopkins L. Turney (Winchester)	Democratic	Mar 4, 1845 – Mar 3, 1851	Elected in 1844. Retired or lost re-election.	10	29th	9	Elected to finish the vacant term. Lost re-election.	Oct 17, 1843 – Mar 3, 1847	Whig	Spencer Jarnagin (Athens)	12
12	Hopkins L. Turney (Winchester)	Democratic	Mar 4, 1845 – Mar 3, 1851	Elected in 1844. Retired or lost re-election.	10	30th	10	Legislature failed to elect.	Mar 4, 1847 – Nov 21, 1847	Vacant		
12	Hopkins L. Turney (Winchester)	Democratic	Mar 4, 1845 – Mar 3, 1851	Elected in 1844. Retired or lost re-election.	10	30th	10	Elected late in 1847	Nov 22, 1847 – Mar 3, 1859	Whig	John Bell (Nashville)	13
12	Hopkins L. Turney (Winchester)	Democratic	Mar 4, 1845 – Mar 3, 1851	Elected in 1844. Retired or lost re-election.	10	31st	10	Elected late in 1847	Nov 22, 1847 – Mar 3, 1859	Whig	John Bell (Nashville)	13
13	James C. Jones (Memphis)	Whig	Mar 4, 1851 – Mar 3, 1857	Elected in 1851. Retired.	11	32nd	10	Elected late in 1847	Nov 22, 1847 – Mar 3, 1859	Whig	John Bell (Nashville)	13
13	James C. Jones (Memphis)	Whig	Mar 4, 1851 – Mar 3, 1857	Elected in 1851. Retired.	11	33rd	11	Re-elected in 1853. Retired or lost re-election.	Nov 22, 1847 – Mar 3, 1859	Whig	John Bell (Nashville)	13
13	James C. Jones (Memphis)	Whig	Mar 4, 1851 – Mar 3, 1857	Elected in 1851. Retired.	11	34th	11	Re-elected in 1853. Retired or lost re-election.	Nov 22, 1847 – Mar 3, 1859	Whig	John Bell (Nashville)	13
Vacant			Mar 4, 1857 – Oct 8, 1857	Legislature failed to elect.	12	35th	11	Re-elected in 1853. Retired or lost re-election.	Nov 22, 1847 – Mar 3, 1859	Know-Nothing	John Bell (Nashville)	13
14	Andrew Johnson (Greeneville)	Democratic	Oct 8, 1857 – Mar 4, 1862	Elected in 1857 to finish the term. Resigned to become Military Governor of Tennessee.	12	35th	11	Re-elected in 1853. Retired or lost re-election.	Nov 22, 1847 – Mar 3, 1859	Know-Nothing	John Bell (Nashville)	13
14	Andrew Johnson (Greeneville)	Democratic	Oct 8, 1857 – Mar 4, 1862	Elected in 1857 to finish the term. Resigned to become Military Governor of Tennessee.	12	36th	12	Elected in 1858. Withdrew in anticipation of secession.	Mar 4, 1859 – Mar 3, 1861	Democratic	Alfred O. P. Nicholson (Columbia)	14
14	Andrew Johnson (Greeneville)	Democratic	Oct 8, 1857 – Mar 4, 1862	Elected in 1857 to finish the term. Resigned to become Military Governor of Tennessee.	12	37th	12	Civil War and Reconstruction	Mar 4, 1861 – Jul 24, 1866	Vacant		
Vacant			Mar 4, 1862 – Jul 24, 1866	Civil War and Reconstruction	12	37th	12	Civil War and Reconstruction	Mar 4, 1861 – Jul 24, 1866	Vacant		
Vacant			Mar 4, 1862 – Jul 24, 1866	Civil War and Reconstruction	13	38th	12	Civil War and Reconstruction	Mar 4, 1861 – Jul 24, 1866	Vacant		
Vacant			Mar 4, 1862 – Jul 24, 1866	Civil War and Reconstruction	13	39th	13	Civil War and Reconstruction	Mar 4, 1861 – Jul 24, 1866	Vacant		
15	David T. Patterson (Greeneville)	Unionist	Jul 24, 1866 – Mar 3, 1869	Elected to finish the vacant term. Retired.	13	39th	13	Elected to finish the vacant term. Retired.	Jul 24, 1866 – Mar 3, 1871	Unionist	Joseph S. Fowler (Nashville)	15
15	David T. Patterson (Greeneville)	Democratic	Jul 24, 1866 – Mar 3, 1869	Elected to finish the vacant term. Retired.	13	40th	13	Elected to finish the vacant term. Retired.	Jul 24, 1866 – Mar 3, 1871	Republican	Joseph S. Fowler (Nashville)	15
16	Parson Brownlow (Knoxville)	Republican	Mar 4, 1869 – Mar 3, 1875	Elected in 1867. Retired.	14	41st	13	Elected to finish the vacant term. Retired.	Jul 24, 1866 – Mar 3, 1871	Republican	Joseph S. Fowler (Nashville)	15
16	Parson Brownlow (Knoxville)	Republican	Mar 4, 1869 – Mar 3, 1875	Elected in 1867. Retired.	14	42nd	14	Elected in 1870 or 1871. Retired.	Mar 4, 1871 – Mar 3, 1877	Democratic	Henry Cooper (Nashville)	16
16	Parson Brownlow (Knoxville)	Republican	Mar 4, 1869 – Mar 3, 1875	Elected in 1867. Retired.	14	43rd	14	Elected in 1870 or 1871. Retired.	Mar 4, 1871 – Mar 3, 1877	Democratic	Henry Cooper (Nashville)	16
17	Andrew Johnson (Greeneville)	Democratic	Mar 4, 1875 – Jul 31, 1875	Elected in 1875. Died.	15	44th	14	Elected in 1870 or 1871. Retired.	Mar 4, 1871 – Mar 3, 1877	Democratic	Henry Cooper (Nashville)	16
Vacant			Jul 31, 1875 – Aug 18, 1875		15	44th	14	Elected in 1870 or 1871. Retired.	Mar 4, 1871 – Mar 3, 1877	Democratic	Henry Cooper (Nashville)	16
18	David M. Key (Chattanooga)	Democratic	Aug 18, 1875 – Jan 19, 1877	Appointed to continue Johnson's term. Lost election to finish Johnson's term.	15	44th	14	Elected in 1870 or 1871. Retired.	Mar 4, 1871 – Mar 3, 1877	Democratic	Henry Cooper (Nashville)	16
19	James E. Bailey (Clarksville)	Democratic	Jan 19, 1877 – Mar 3, 1881	Elected to finish Johnson's term. Lost re-election.	15	44th	14	Elected in 1870 or 1871. Retired.	Mar 4, 1871 – Mar 3, 1877	Democratic	Henry Cooper (Nashville)	16
19	James E. Bailey (Clarksville)	Democratic	Jan 19, 1877 – Mar 3, 1881	Elected to finish Johnson's term. Lost re-election.	15	45th	15	Elected in 1877.	Mar 4, 1877 – Jul 8, 1897	Democratic	Isham G. Harris (Memphis)	17
19	James E. Bailey (Clarksville)	Democratic	Jan 19, 1877 – Mar 3, 1881	Elected to finish Johnson's term. Lost re-election.	15	46th	15	Elected in 1877.	Mar 4, 1877 – Jul 8, 1897	Democratic	Isham G. Harris (Memphis)	17
20	Howell Jackson (Nashville)	Democratic	Mar 4, 1881 – Apr 14, 1886	Elected in 1880 or 1881. Resigned to become U.S. Circuit Judge.	16	47th	15	Elected in 1877.	Mar 4, 1877 – Jul 8, 1897	Democratic	Isham G. Harris (Memphis)	17
20	Howell Jackson (Nashville)	Democratic	Mar 4, 1881 – Apr 14, 1886	Elected in 1880 or 1881. Resigned to become U.S. Circuit Judge.	16	48th	16	Re-elected in 1883.	Mar 4, 1877 – Jul 8, 1897	Democratic	Isham G. Harris (Memphis)	17
20	Howell Jackson (Nashville)	Democratic	Mar 4, 1881 – Apr 14, 1886	Elected in 1880 or 1881. Resigned to become U.S. Circuit Judge.	16	49th	16	Re-elected in 1883.	Mar 4, 1877 – Jul 8, 1897	Democratic	Isham G. Harris (Memphis)	17
Vacant			Apr 14, 1886 – Apr 16, 1886		16	49th	16	Re-elected in 1883.	Mar 4, 1877 – Jul 8, 1897	Democratic	Isham G. Harris (Memphis)	17
21	Washington Whitthorne (Columbia)	Democratic	Apr 16, 1886 – Mar 3, 1887	Appointed to finish Jackson's term. Retired to serve in the U.S. House.	16	49th	16	Re-elected in 1883.	Mar 4, 1877 – Jul 8, 1897	Democratic	Isham G. Harris (Memphis)	17
22	William B. Bate (Nashville)	Democratic	Mar 4, 1887 – Mar 9, 1905	Elected in 1887.	17	50th	16	Re-elected in 1883.	Mar 4, 1877 – Jul 8, 1897	Democratic	Isham G. Harris (Memphis)	17
22	William B. Bate (Nashville)	Democratic	Mar 4, 1887 – Mar 9, 1905	Elected in 1887.	17	51st	17	Re-elected in 1889.	Mar 4, 1877 – Jul 8, 1897	Democratic	Isham G. Harris (Memphis)	17
22	William B. Bate (Nashville)	Democratic	Mar 4, 1887 – Mar 9, 1905	Elected in 1887.	17	52nd	17	Re-elected in 1889.	Mar 4, 1877 – Jul 8, 1897	Democratic	Isham G. Harris (Memphis)	17
22	William B. Bate (Nashville)	Democratic	Mar 4, 1887 – Mar 9, 1905	Re-elected in 1893.	18	53rd	17	Re-elected in 1889.	Mar 4, 1877 – Jul 8, 1897	Democratic	Isham G. Harris (Memphis)	17
22	William B. Bate (Nashville)	Democratic	Mar 4, 1887 – Mar 9, 1905	Re-elected in 1893.	18	54th	18	Re-elected in 1895. Died.	Mar 4, 1877 – Jul 8, 1897	Democratic	Isham G. Harris (Memphis)	17
22	William B. Bate (Nashville)	Democratic	Mar 4, 1887 – Mar 9, 1905	Re-elected in 1893.	18	55th	18	Re-elected in 1895. Died.	Mar 4, 1877 – Jul 8, 1897	Democratic	Isham G. Harris (Memphis)	17
22	William B. Bate (Nashville)	Democratic	Mar 4, 1887 – Mar 9, 1905	Re-elected in 1893.	18	55th	18		Jul 9, 1897 – Jul 19, 1897	Vacant		
22	William B. Bate (Nashville)	Democratic	Mar 4, 1887 – Mar 9, 1905	Re-elected in 1893.	18	55th	18	Appointed to continue Harris's term. Elected in 1898 to finish Harris's term. Retired.	Jul 20, 1897 – Mar 3, 1901	Democratic	Thomas B. Turley (Memphis)	18
22	William B. Bate (Nashville)	Democratic	Mar 4, 1887 – Mar 9, 1905	Re-elected in 1899	19	56th	18	Appointed to continue Harris's term. Elected in 1898 to finish Harris's term. Retired.	Jul 20, 1897 – Mar 3, 1901	Democratic	Thomas B. Turley (Memphis)	18
22	William B. Bate (Nashville)	Democratic	Mar 4, 1887 – Mar 9, 1905	Re-elected in 1899	19	57th	19	Elected in 1901. Lost renomination.	Mar 4, 1901 – Mar 3, 1907	Democratic	Edward W. Carmack (Memphis)	19
22	William B. Bate (Nashville)	Democratic	Mar 4, 1887 – Mar 9, 1905	Re-elected in 1899	19	58th	19	Elected in 1901. Lost renomination.	Mar 4, 1901 – Mar 3, 1907	Democratic	Edward W. Carmack (Memphis)	19
22	William B. Bate (Nashville)	Democratic	Mar 4, 1887 – Mar 9, 1905	Re-elected in 1905. Died.	20	59th	19	Elected in 1901. Lost renomination.	Mar 4, 1901 – Mar 3, 1907	Democratic	Edward W. Carmack (Memphis)	19
Vacant			Mar 10, 1905 – Mar 20, 1905		20	59th	19	Elected in 1901. Lost renomination.	Mar 4, 1901 – Mar 3, 1907	Democratic	Edward W. Carmack (Memphis)	19
23	James B. Frazier (Chattanooga)	Democratic	Mar 21, 1905 – Mar 3, 1911	Elected to finish Bate's term. Lost re-election.	20	59th	19	Elected in 1901. Lost renomination.	Mar 4, 1901 – Mar 3, 1907	Democratic	Edward W. Carmack (Memphis)	19
23	James B. Frazier (Chattanooga)	Democratic	Mar 21, 1905 – Mar 3, 1911	Elected to finish Bate's term. Lost re-election.	20	60th	20	Elected in 1907. Died.	Mar 4, 1907 – Mar 31, 1912	Democratic	Robert Love Taylor (Nashville)	20
23	James B. Frazier (Chattanooga)	Democratic	Mar 21, 1905 – Mar 3, 1911	Elected to finish Bate's term. Lost re-election.	20	61st	20	Elected in 1907. Died.	Mar 4, 1907 – Mar 31, 1912	Democratic	Robert Love Taylor (Nashville)	20
24	Luke Lea (Nashville)	Democratic	Mar 4, 1911 – Mar 3, 1917	Elected in 1911. Lost renomination.	21	62nd	20	Elected in 1907. Died.	Mar 4, 1907 – Mar 31, 1912	Democratic	Robert Love Taylor (Nashville)	20
24	Luke Lea (Nashville)	Democratic	Mar 4, 1911 – Mar 3, 1917	Elected in 1911. Lost renomination.	21	62nd	20		Apr 1, 1912 – Apr 10, 1912	Vacant		
24	Luke Lea (Nashville)	Democratic	Mar 4, 1911 – Mar 3, 1917	Elected in 1911. Lost renomination.	21	62nd	20	Appointed to continue Taylor's term. Retired when his successor was elected.	Apr 11, 1912 – Jan 24, 1913	Republican	Newell Sanders (Memphis)	21
24	Luke Lea (Nashville)	Democratic	Mar 4, 1911 – Mar 3, 1917	Elected in 1911. Lost renomination.	21	62nd	20	Elected to finish Taylor's term. Retired.	Jan 24, 1913 – Mar 3, 1913	Democratic	William R. Webb (Bell Buckle)	22
24	Luke Lea (Nashville)	Democratic	Mar 4, 1911 – Mar 3, 1917	Elected in 1911. Lost renomination.	21	63rd	21	Elected in 1913.	Mar 4, 1913 – Mar 3, 1925	Democratic	John K. Shields (Knoxville)	23
24	Luke Lea (Nashville)	Democratic	Mar 4, 1911 – Mar 3, 1917	Elected in 1911. Lost renomination.	21	64th	21	Elected in 1913.	Mar 4, 1913 – Mar 3, 1925	Democratic	John K. Shields (Knoxville)	23
25	Kenneth McKellar (Memphis)	Democratic	Mar 4, 1917 – Jan 3, 1953	Elected in 1916.	22	65th	21	Elected in 1913.	Mar 4, 1913 – Mar 3, 1925	Democratic	John K. Shields (Knoxville)	23
25	Kenneth McKellar (Memphis)	Democratic	Mar 4, 1917 – Jan 3, 1953	Elected in 1916.	22	66th	22	Re-elected in 1918. Lost renomination.	Mar 4, 1913 – Mar 3, 1925	Democratic	John K. Shields (Knoxville)	23
25	Kenneth McKellar (Memphis)	Democratic	Mar 4, 1917 – Jan 3, 1953	Elected in 1916.	22	67th	22	Re-elected in 1918. Lost renomination.	Mar 4, 1913 – Mar 3, 1925	Democratic	John K. Shields (Knoxville)	23
25	Kenneth McKellar (Memphis)	Democratic	Mar 4, 1917 – Jan 3, 1953	Re-elected in 1922.	23	68th	22	Re-elected in 1918. Lost renomination.	Mar 4, 1913 – Mar 3, 1925	Democratic	John K. Shields (Knoxville)	23
25	Kenneth McKellar (Memphis)	Democratic	Mar 4, 1917 – Jan 3, 1953	Re-elected in 1922.	23	69th	23	Elected in 1924. Died.	Mar 4, 1925 – Aug 24, 1929	Democratic	Lawrence Tyson (Knoxville)	24
25	Kenneth McKellar (Memphis)	Democratic	Mar 4, 1917 – Jan 3, 1953	Re-elected in 1922.	23	70th	23	Elected in 1924. Died.	Mar 4, 1925 – Aug 24, 1929	Democratic	Lawrence Tyson (Knoxville)	24
25	Kenneth McKellar (Memphis)	Democratic	Mar 4, 1917 – Jan 3, 1953	Re-elected in 1928.	24	71st	23	Elected in 1924. Died.	Mar 4, 1925 – Aug 24, 1929	Democratic	Lawrence Tyson (Knoxville)	24
25	Kenneth McKellar (Memphis)	Democratic	Mar 4, 1917 – Jan 3, 1953	Re-elected in 1928.	24	71st	23		Aug 25, 1929 – Sep 1, 1929	Vacant		
25	Kenneth McKellar (Memphis)	Democratic	Mar 4, 1917 – Jan 3, 1953	Re-elected in 1928.	24	71st	23	Appointed to continue Tyson's term. Elected in 1930 to finish Tyson's term. Retired.	Sep 2, 1929 – Mar 3, 1931	Democratic	William E. Brock (Chattanooga)	25
25	Kenneth McKellar (Memphis)	Democratic	Mar 4, 1917 – Jan 3, 1953	Re-elected in 1928.	24	72nd	24	Elected in 1930. Resigned to become U.S. Secretary of State.	Mar 4, 1931 – Mar 3, 1933	Democratic	Cordell Hull (Carthage)	26
25	Kenneth McKellar (Memphis)	Democratic	Mar 4, 1917 – Jan 3, 1953	Re-elected in 1928.	24	73rd	24	Appointed to continue Hull's term. Elected in 1934 to finish Hull's term.	Mar 4, 1933 – Apr 23, 1937	Democratic	Nathan L. Bachman (Chattanooga)	27
25	Kenneth McKellar (Memphis)	Democratic	Mar 4, 1917 – Jan 3, 1953	Re-elected in 1934.	25	74th	24	Appointed to continue Hull's term. Elected in 1934 to finish Hull's term.	Mar 4, 1933 – Apr 23, 1937	Democratic	Nathan L. Bachman (Chattanooga)	27
25	Kenneth McKellar (Memphis)	Democratic	Mar 4, 1917 – Jan 3, 1953	Re-elected in 1934.	25	75th	25	Re-elected in 1936. Died.	Mar 4, 1933 – Apr 23, 1937	Democratic	Nathan L. Bachman (Chattanooga)	27
25	Kenneth McKellar (Memphis)	Democratic	Mar 4, 1917 – Jan 3, 1953	Re-elected in 1934.	25	75th	25		Apr 24, 1937 – May 5, 1937	Vacant		
25	Kenneth McKellar (Memphis)	Democratic	Mar 4, 1917 – Jan 3, 1953	Re-elected in 1934.	25	75th	25	Appointed to continue Bachman's term. Retired when his successor was elected.	May 6, 1937 – Nov 8, 1938	Democratic	George L. Berry (Pressmen's Home)	28
25	Kenneth McKellar (Memphis)	Democratic	Mar 4, 1917 – Jan 3, 1953	Re-elected in 1934.	25	75th	25	Elected to finish Bachman's term. Did not take his seat until 1939 in order to remain District Attorney General.	Nov 9, 1938 – Jan 3, 1949	Democratic	Tom Stewart (Winchester)	29
25	Kenneth McKellar (Memphis)	Democratic	Mar 4, 1917 – Jan 3, 1953	Re-elected in 1934.	25	76th	25	Elected to finish Bachman's term. Did not take his seat until 1939 in order to remain District Attorney General.	Nov 9, 1938 – Jan 3, 1949	Democratic	Tom Stewart (Winchester)	29
25	Kenneth McKellar (Memphis)	Democratic	Mar 4, 1917 – Jan 3, 1953	Re-elected in 1940.	26	77th	25	Elected to finish Bachman's term. Did not take his seat until 1939 in order to remain District Attorney General.	Nov 9, 1938 – Jan 3, 1949	Democratic	Tom Stewart (Winchester)	29
25	Kenneth McKellar (Memphis)	Democratic	Mar 4, 1917 – Jan 3, 1953	Re-elected in 1940.	26	78th	26	Re-elected in 1942. Lost renomination.	Nov 9, 1938 – Jan 3, 1949	Democratic	Tom Stewart (Winchester)	29
25	Kenneth McKellar (Memphis)	Democratic	Mar 4, 1917 – Jan 3, 1953	Re-elected in 1940.	26	79th	26	Re-elected in 1942. Lost renomination.	Nov 9, 1938 – Jan 3, 1949	Democratic	Tom Stewart (Winchester)	29
25	Kenneth McKellar (Memphis)	Democratic	Mar 4, 1917 – Jan 3, 1953	Re-elected in 1946. Lost renomination.	27	80th	26	Re-elected in 1942. Lost renomination.	Nov 9, 1938 – Jan 3, 1949	Democratic	Tom Stewart (Winchester)	29
25	Kenneth McKellar (Memphis)	Democratic	Mar 4, 1917 – Jan 3, 1953	Re-elected in 1946. Lost renomination.	27	81st	27	Elected in 1948.	Jan 3, 1949 – Aug 10, 1963	Democratic	Estes Kefauver (Lookout Mountain)	30
25	Kenneth McKellar (Memphis)	Democratic	Mar 4, 1917 – Jan 3, 1953	Re-elected in 1946. Lost renomination.	27	82nd	27	Elected in 1948.	Jan 3, 1949 – Aug 10, 1963	Democratic	Estes Kefauver (Lookout Mountain)	30
26	Albert Gore Sr. (Carthage)	Democratic	Jan 3, 1953 – Jan 3, 1971	Elected in 1952.	28	83rd	27	Elected in 1948.	Jan 3, 1949 – Aug 10, 1963	Democratic	Estes Kefauver (Lookout Mountain)	30
26	Albert Gore Sr. (Carthage)	Democratic	Jan 3, 1953 – Jan 3, 1971	Elected in 1952.	28	84th	28	Re-elected in 1954.	Jan 3, 1949 – Aug 10, 1963	Democratic	Estes Kefauver (Lookout Mountain)	30
26	Albert Gore Sr. (Carthage)	Democratic	Jan 3, 1953 – Jan 3, 1971	Elected in 1952.	28	85th	28	Re-elected in 1954.	Jan 3, 1949 – Aug 10, 1963	Democratic	Estes Kefauver (Lookout Mountain)	30
26	Albert Gore Sr. (Carthage)	Democratic	Jan 3, 1953 – Jan 3, 1971	Re-elected in 1958.	29	86th	28	Re-elected in 1954.	Jan 3, 1949 – Aug 10, 1963	Democratic	Estes Kefauver (Lookout Mountain)	30
26	Albert Gore Sr. (Carthage)	Democratic	Jan 3, 1953 – Jan 3, 1971	Re-elected in 1958.	29	87th	29	Re-elected in 1960. Died.	Jan 3, 1949 – Aug 10, 1963	Democratic	Estes Kefauver (Lookout Mountain)	30
26	Albert Gore Sr. (Carthage)	Democratic	Jan 3, 1953 – Jan 3, 1971	Re-elected in 1958.	29	88th	29	Re-elected in 1960. Died.	Jan 3, 1949 – Aug 10, 1963	Democratic	Estes Kefauver (Lookout Mountain)	30
26	Albert Gore Sr. (Carthage)	Democratic	Jan 3, 1953 – Jan 3, 1971	Re-elected in 1958.	29	88th	29		Aug 10, 1963 – Aug 20, 1963	Vacant		
26	Albert Gore Sr. (Carthage)	Democratic	Jan 3, 1953 – Jan 3, 1971	Re-elected in 1958.	29	88th	29	Appointed to continue Kefauver's term. Retired.	Aug 20, 1963 – Nov 3, 1964	Democratic	Herbert S. Walters (Morristown)	31
26	Albert Gore Sr. (Carthage)	Democratic	Jan 3, 1953 – Jan 3, 1971	Re-elected in 1958.	29	88th	29	Elected to finish Kefauver's term. Lost renomination.	Nov 4, 1964 – Jan 3, 1967	Democratic	Ross Bass (Pulaski)	32
26	Albert Gore Sr. (Carthage)	Democratic	Jan 3, 1953 – Jan 3, 1971	Re-elected in 1964. Lost re-election.	30	89th	29	Elected to finish Kefauver's term. Lost renomination.	Nov 4, 1964 – Jan 3, 1967	Democratic	Ross Bass (Pulaski)	32
26	Albert Gore Sr. (Carthage)	Democratic	Jan 3, 1953 – Jan 3, 1971	Re-elected in 1964. Lost re-election.	30	90th	30	Elected in 1966.	Jan 3, 1967 – Jan 3, 1985	Republican	Howard Baker (Huntsville)	33
26	Albert Gore Sr. (Carthage)	Democratic	Jan 3, 1953 – Jan 3, 1971	Re-elected in 1964. Lost re-election.	30	91st	30	Elected in 1966.	Jan 3, 1967 – Jan 3, 1985	Republican	Howard Baker (Huntsville)	33
27	Bill Brock (Lookout Mountain)	Republican	Jan 3, 1971 – Jan 3, 1977	Elected in 1970. Lost re-election.	31	92nd	30	Elected in 1966.	Jan 3, 1967 – Jan 3, 1985	Republican	Howard Baker (Huntsville)	33
27	Bill Brock (Lookout Mountain)	Republican	Jan 3, 1971 – Jan 3, 1977	Elected in 1970. Lost re-election.	31	93rd	31	Re-elected in 1972.	Jan 3, 1967 – Jan 3, 1985	Republican	Howard Baker (Huntsville)	33
27	Bill Brock (Lookout Mountain)	Republican	Jan 3, 1971 – Jan 3, 1977	Elected in 1970. Lost re-election.	31	94th	31	Re-elected in 1972.	Jan 3, 1967 – Jan 3, 1985	Republican	Howard Baker (Huntsville)	33
28	Jim Sasser (Nashville)	Democratic	Jan 3, 1977 – Jan 3, 1995	Elected in 1976.	32	95th	31	Re-elected in 1972.	Jan 3, 1967 – Jan 3, 1985	Republican	Howard Baker (Huntsville)	33
28	Jim Sasser (Nashville)	Democratic	Jan 3, 1977 – Jan 3, 1995	Elected in 1976.	32	96th	32	Re-elected in 1978. Retired.	Jan 3, 1967 – Jan 3, 1985	Republican	Howard Baker (Huntsville)	33
28	Jim Sasser (Nashville)	Democratic	Jan 3, 1977 – Jan 3, 1995	Elected in 1976.	32	97th	32	Re-elected in 1978. Retired.	Jan 3, 1967 – Jan 3, 1985	Republican	Howard Baker (Huntsville)	33
28	Jim Sasser (Nashville)	Democratic	Jan 3, 1977 – Jan 3, 1995	Re-elected in 1982.	33	98th	32	Re-elected in 1978. Retired.	Jan 3, 1967 – Jan 3, 1985	Republican	Howard Baker (Huntsville)	33
28	Jim Sasser (Nashville)	Democratic	Jan 3, 1977 – Jan 3, 1995	Re-elected in 1982.	33	99th	33	Elected in 1984.	Jan 3, 1985 – Jan 2, 1993	Democratic	Al Gore (Carthage)	34
28	Jim Sasser (Nashville)	Democratic	Jan 3, 1977 – Jan 3, 1995	Re-elected in 1982.	33	100th	33	Elected in 1984.	Jan 3, 1985 – Jan 2, 1993	Democratic	Al Gore (Carthage)	34
28	Jim Sasser (Nashville)	Democratic	Jan 3, 1977 – Jan 3, 1995	Re-elected in 1988. Lost re-election.	34	101st	33	Elected in 1984.	Jan 3, 1985 – Jan 2, 1993	Democratic	Al Gore (Carthage)	34
28	Jim Sasser (Nashville)	Democratic	Jan 3, 1977 – Jan 3, 1995	Re-elected in 1988. Lost re-election.	34	102nd	34	Re-elected in 1990. Resigned to become U.S. Vice President.	Jan 3, 1985 – Jan 2, 1993	Democratic	Al Gore (Carthage)	34
28	Jim Sasser (Nashville)	Democratic	Jan 3, 1977 – Jan 3, 1995	Re-elected in 1988. Lost re-election.	34	102nd	34	Appointed to continue Gore's term. Retired when his successor was elected.	Jan 2, 1993 – Dec 2, 1994	Democratic	Harlan Mathews (Nashville)	35
28	Jim Sasser (Nashville)	Democratic	Jan 3, 1977 – Jan 3, 1995	Re-elected in 1988. Lost re-election.	34	103rd	34	Appointed to continue Gore's term. Retired when his successor was elected.	Jan 2, 1993 – Dec 2, 1994	Democratic	Harlan Mathews (Nashville)	35
28	Jim Sasser (Nashville)	Democratic	Jan 3, 1977 – Jan 3, 1995	Re-elected in 1988. Lost re-election.	34	103rd	34	Elected in 1994 to finish Gore's term.	Dec 2, 1994 – Jan 3, 2003	Republican	Fred Thompson (Nashville)	36
29	Bill Frist (Nashville)	Republican	Jan 3, 1995 – Jan 3, 2007	Elected in 1994.	35	104th	34	Elected in 1994 to finish Gore's term.	Dec 2, 1994 – Jan 3, 2003	Republican	Fred Thompson (Nashville)	36
29	Bill Frist (Nashville)	Republican	Jan 3, 1995 – Jan 3, 2007	Elected in 1994.	35	105th	35	Re-elected to a full term in 1996. Retired.	Dec 2, 1994 – Jan 3, 2003	Republican	Fred Thompson (Nashville)	36
29	Bill Frist (Nashville)	Republican	Jan 3, 1995 – Jan 3, 2007	Elected in 1994.	35	106th	35	Re-elected to a full term in 1996. Retired.	Dec 2, 1994 – Jan 3, 2003	Republican	Fred Thompson (Nashville)	36
29	Bill Frist (Nashville)	Republican	Jan 3, 1995 – Jan 3, 2007	Re-elected in 2000. Retired.	36	107th	35	Re-elected to a full term in 1996. Retired.	Dec 2, 1994 – Jan 3, 2003	Republican	Fred Thompson (Nashville)	36
29	Bill Frist (Nashville)	Republican	Jan 3, 1995 – Jan 3, 2007	Re-elected in 2000. Retired.	36	108th	36	Elected in 2002.	Jan 3, 2003 – Jan 3, 2021	Republican	Lamar Alexander (Nashville)	37
29	Bill Frist (Nashville)	Republican	Jan 3, 1995 – Jan 3, 2007	Re-elected in 2000. Retired.	36	109th	36	Elected in 2002.	Jan 3, 2003 – Jan 3, 2021	Republican	Lamar Alexander (Nashville)	37
30	Bob Corker (Chattanooga)	Republican	Jan 3, 2007 – Jan 3, 2019	Elected in 2006.	37	110th	36	Elected in 2002.	Jan 3, 2003 – Jan 3, 2021	Republican	Lamar Alexander (Nashville)	37
30	Bob Corker (Chattanooga)	Republican	Jan 3, 2007 – Jan 3, 2019	Elected in 2006.	37	111th	37	Re-elected in 2008.	Jan 3, 2003 – Jan 3, 2021	Republican	Lamar Alexander (Nashville)	37
30	Bob Corker (Chattanooga)	Republican	Jan 3, 2007 – Jan 3, 2019	Elected in 2006.	37	112th	37	Re-elected in 2008.	Jan 3, 2003 – Jan 3, 2021	Republican	Lamar Alexander (Nashville)	37
30	Bob Corker (Chattanooga)	Republican	Jan 3, 2007 – Jan 3, 2019	Re-elected in 2012. Retired.	38	113th	37	Re-elected in 2008.	Jan 3, 2003 – Jan 3, 2021	Republican	Lamar Alexander (Nashville)	37
30	Bob Corker (Chattanooga)	Republican	Jan 3, 2007 – Jan 3, 2019	Re-elected in 2012. Retired.	38	114th	38	Re-elected in 2014. Retired.	Jan 3, 2003 – Jan 3, 2021	Republican	Lamar Alexander (Nashville)	37
30	Bob Corker (Chattanooga)	Republican	Jan 3, 2007 – Jan 3, 2019	Re-elected in 2012. Retired.	38	115th	38	Re-elected in 2014. Retired.	Jan 3, 2003 – Jan 3, 2021	Republican	Lamar Alexander (Nashville)	37
31	Marsha Blackburn (Brentwood)	Republican	Jan 3, 2019 – present	Elected in 2018.	39	116th	38	Re-elected in 2014. Retired.	Jan 3, 2003 – Jan 3, 2021	Republican	Lamar Alexander (Nashville)	37
31	Marsha Blackburn (Brentwood)	Republican	Jan 3, 2019 – present	Elected in 2018.	39	117th	39	Elected in 2020.	Jan 3, 2021 – present	Republican	Bill Hagerty (Nashville)	38
31	Marsha Blackburn (Brentwood)	Republican	Jan 3, 2019 – present	Elected in 2018.	39	118th	39	Elected in 2020.	Jan 3, 2021 – present	Republican	Bill Hagerty (Nashville)	38
31	Marsha Blackburn (Brentwood)	Republican	Jan 3, 2019 – present	Re-elected in 2024. Resigning to become governor of Tennessee.	40	119th	39	Elected in 2020.	Jan 3, 2021 – present	Republican	Bill Hagerty (Nashville)	38
32	TBD	Republican	TBD	Appointed to continue Blackburn's term.	40	120th	40	Re-elected in 2026.	Jan 3, 2021 – present	Republican	Bill Hagerty (Nashville)	38
To be determined in the 2028 special election.					40	120th	40	Re-elected in 2026.	Jan 3, 2021 – present	Republican	Bill Hagerty (Nashville)	38
To be determined in the 2028 special election.					40	121st	40	Re-elected in 2026.	Jan 3, 2021 – present	Republican	Bill Hagerty (Nashville)	38
To be determined in the 2030 election.					41	122nd	40	Re-elected in 2026.	Jan 3, 2021 – present	Republican	Bill Hagerty (Nashville)	38
To be determined in the 2030 election.					41	123rd	41	To be determined in the 2032 election.				

== See also ==
- Elections in Tennessee
- List of United States representatives from Tennessee
- Tennessee's congressional delegations
