= List of presidents pro tempore of the United States Senate =

The president pro tempore of the United States Senate (also president pro tem) is the second-highest-ranking official of the United States Senate. Article I, Section Three of the United States Constitution provides that the vice president of the United States, despite not being a senator, is the president of the Senate. It also establishes that the Senate must choose a president pro tempore to act in the absence of the vice president:

The Senate shall choose their other Officers, and also a President pro tempore, in the absence of the Vice President, or when he [or she] shall exercise the Office of President of the United States.

In practice, neither the vice president nor the president pro tempore usually presides; instead, the duty of presiding officer is rotated among junior senators of the majority party to give them experience in parliamentary procedure.

The president pro tempore is third in the line of succession to the presidency, after the vice president and the speaker of the House of Representatives and ahead of the secretary of state.

Since 1890, the president pro tempore has held the office continuously until the election of another president pro tempore, and since 1945 the most senior senator in the majority party has generally been chosen. During most of the 62nd Congress, following William Frye's resignation on April 27, 1911, five senators—Augustus Bacon, Charles Curtis, Jacob Gallinger, Henry Cabot Lodge, and Frank Brandegee—alternated as president pro tempore.

Since the office was created in 1789, 92 individuals, from 39 of the 50 states, have served as president pro tempore of the Senate. The current president pro tempore is Chuck Grassley of Iowa, who assumed office on January 3, 2025, at the start of the 119th Congress. In 2001, the honorary title of president pro tempore emeritus was created, and it has been given to a senator of the minority party who has previously served as president pro tempore. This title is currently held by Patty Murray of Washington.

Every president pro tempore but one has been a member of a political party or faction; the number affiliated with each is:

Democratic – 32; Republican – 25; Democratic-Republican – 15; (Note: Henry Tazewell was affiliated with the Anti-Administration bloc prior to formation of the Democratic-Republican Party.) (Note: Samuel Smith was a member of the Democratic–Republican Party until it became fractured, at which time he sided with its pro-Jackson faction.) Federalist – 10; Jacksonian – 3; Anti-Administration – 2; National Republican – 2; Pro-Administration – 2; Whig – 2; Independent – 1.

== Presidents pro tempore ==
Portrait	Name	State	Party	Term	Congress
	John Langdon (Note: Served during a vacancy in the vice presidency, April 6–21, 1789, prior to the inauguration of John Adams.)	New Hampshire	Pro-Administration	April 6–21, 1789	1st Congress
	John Langdon	New Hampshire	Pro-Administration	August 7–9, 1789	1st Congress
	Richard Henry Lee	Virginia	Anti-Administration	April 18 – October 8, 1792	2nd Congress
	John Langdon	New Hampshire	Pro-Administration	November 5 – December 4, 1792	2nd Congress
	John Langdon	New Hampshire	Pro-Administration	March 1–3, 1793	2nd Congress
	John Langdon	New Hampshire	Pro-Administration	March 4 – December 2, 1793	3rd Congress
	Ralph Izard	South Carolina	Pro-Administration	May 31 – November 9, 1794	3rd Congress
	Henry Tazewell	Virginia	Anti-Administration	February 20, 1795 – June 7, 1795	3rd Congress
	Henry Tazewell	Virginia	Democratic-Republican	February 20, 1795 – June 7, 1795	4th Congress
	Henry Tazewell	Virginia	Democratic-Republican	December 7–8, 1795	4th Congress
	Samuel Livermore	New Hampshire	Federalist	May 6 – December 4, 1796	4th Congress
	William Bingham	Pennsylvania	Federalist	February 16 – March 3, 1797	4th Congress
	William Bradford	Rhode Island	Federalist	July 6 – October 1797	5th Congress
	Jacob Read	South Carolina	Federalist	November 22 – December 12, 1797	5th Congress
	Theodore Sedgwick	Massachusetts	Federalist	June 27 – December 5, 1798	5th Congress
	John Laurance	New York	Federalist	December 6–27, 1798	5th Congress
	James Ross	Pennsylvania	Federalist	March 1 – December 1, 1799	5th Congress
	Samuel Livermore	New Hampshire	Federalist	December 2–29, 1799	6th Congress
	Uriah Tracy	Connecticut	Federalist	May 14 – November 16, 1800	6th Congress
	John E. Howard	Maryland	Federalist	November 21–27, 1800	6th Congress
	James Hillhouse	Connecticut	Federalist	February 28 – March 3, 1801	6th Congress
	Abraham Baldwin	Georgia	Democratic-Republican	December 7, 1801 – January 14, 1802	7th Congress
	Abraham Baldwin	Georgia	Democratic-Republican	April 17 – December 13, 1802	7th Congress
	Stephen R. Bradley	Vermont	Democratic-Republican	December 14, 1802 – January 18, 1803	7th Congress
	Stephen R. Bradley	Vermont	Democratic-Republican	February 25, 1803	7th Congress
	Stephen R. Bradley	Vermont	Democratic-Republican	March 2 – October 16, 1803	7th Congress
	John Brown	Kentucky	Democratic-Republican	October 17 – December 6, 1803	8th Congress
	John Brown	Kentucky	Democratic-Republican	January 23 – February 26, 1804	8th Congress
	Jesse Franklin	North Carolina	Democratic-Republican	March 10 – November 4, 1804	8th Congress
	Joseph Anderson	Tennessee	Democratic-Republican	January 15 – February 3, 1805	8th Congress
	Joseph Anderson	Tennessee	Democratic-Republican	February 28 – March 2, 1805	8th Congress
	Joseph Anderson	Tennessee	Democratic-Republican	March 2 – December 1, 1805	8th Congress
	Samuel Smith	Maryland	Democratic-Republican	December 2–15, 1805	9th Congress
	Samuel Smith	Maryland	Democratic-Republican	March 18 – November 30, 1806	9th Congress
	Samuel Smith	Maryland	Democratic-Republican	March 2 – October 25, 1807	9th Congress
	Samuel Smith	Maryland	Democratic-Republican	April 16 – November 6, 1808	10th Congress
	Stephen R. Bradley	Vermont	Democratic-Republican	December 28, 1808 – January 8, 1809	10th Congress
	John Milledge	Georgia	Democratic-Republican	January 30 – March 3, 1809	10th Congress
	John Milledge	Georgia	Democratic-Republican	March 4 – May 21, 1809	11th Congress
	Andrew Gregg	Pennsylvania	Democratic-Republican	June 26 – December 18, 1809	11th Congress
	John Gaillard	South Carolina	Democratic-Republican	February 28 – March 2, 1810	11th Congress
	John Gaillard	South Carolina	Democratic-Republican	April 17 – December 11, 1810	11th Congress
	John Pope	Kentucky	Democratic-Republican	February 23 – November 3, 1811	11th Congress
	William H. Crawford (Note: Served during a vacancy in the vice presidency, April 20, 1812–March 4, 1813, following the death of George Clinton.)	Georgia	Democratic-Republican	March 24, 1812 – March 3, 1813	12th Congress
	William H. Crawford	Georgia	Democratic-Republican	March 4–23, 1813	13th Congress
	Joseph B. Varnum	Massachusetts	Democratic-Republican	December 6, 1813 – February 3, 1814	13th Congress
	John Gaillard (Note: Served during a vacancy in the vice presidency, November 23, 1814–March 4, 1817, following the death of Elbridge Gerry.)	South Carolina	Democratic-Republican	April 18 – November 25, 1814	13th Congress
	John Gaillard	South Carolina	Democratic-Republican	November 25, 1814 – December 3, 1815	13th Congress
	John Gaillard	South Carolina	Democratic-Republican	December 4, 1815 – March 3, 1817	14th Congress
	John Gaillard	South Carolina	Democratic-Republican	March 4, 1817	15th Congress
	John Gaillard	South Carolina	Democratic-Republican	March 6, 1817 – February 18, 1818	15th Congress
	John Gaillard	South Carolina	Democratic-Republican	March 31, 1818 – January 5, 1819	15th Congress
	James Barbour	Virginia	Democratic-Republican	February 15 – December 5, 1819	15th Congress
	James Barbour	Virginia	Democratic-Republican	December 6–26, 1819	16th Congress
	John Gaillard	South Carolina	Democratic-Republican	January 25, 1820 – December 2, 1821	16th Congress
	John Gaillard	South Carolina	Democratic-Republican	December 3–27, 1821	17th Congress
	John Gaillard	South Carolina	Democratic-Republican	February 1 – December 2, 1822	17th Congress
	John Gaillard	South Carolina	Democratic-Republican	February 19 – November 30, 1823	17th Congress
	John Gaillard	South Carolina	Democratic-Republican	December 1, 1823 – January 20, 1824	18th Congress
	John Gaillard	South Carolina	Democratic-Republican	May 21, 1824 – March 3, 1825	18th Congress
	John Gaillard	South Carolina	Democratic-Republican	March 9 – December 4, 1825	19th Congress
	Nathaniel Macon	North Carolina	Democratic-Republican	May 20 – December 3, 1826	19th Congress
	Nathaniel Macon	North Carolina	Democratic-Republican	January 2 – February 13, 1827	19th Congress
	Nathaniel Macon	North Carolina	Democratic-Republican	March 2 – December 2, 1827	19th Congress
	Samuel Smith	Maryland	Jacksonian	May 15 – December 18, 1828	20th Congress
	Samuel Smith	Maryland	Jacksonian	March 13 – December 10, 1829	21st Congress
	Samuel Smith	Maryland	Jacksonian	May 20 – December 31, 1830	21st Congress
	Samuel Smith	Maryland	Jacksonian	March 1 – December 4, 1831	21st Congress
	Samuel Smith	Maryland	Jacksonian	December 5–11, 1831	22nd Congress
	Littleton Tazewell	Virginia	Jacksonian	July 9–16, 1832	22nd Congress
	Hugh Lawson White (Note: Served during a vacancy in the vice presidency, December 28, 1832–March 4, 1833, following the resignation of John C. Calhoun.)	Tennessee	Jacksonian	December 3, 1832 – December 1, 1833	22nd Congress
	Hugh Lawson White	Tennessee	Jacksonian	December 2–15, 1833	23rd Congress
	George Poindexter	Mississippi	National Republican	June 28 – November 30, 1834	23rd Congress
	John Tyler	Virginia	National Republican	March 3 – December 6, 1835	24th Congress
	William R. King	Alabama	Democratic	July 1 – December 4, 1836	24th Congress
	William R. King	Alabama	Democratic	January 28 – March 3, 1837	24th Congress
	William R. King	Alabama	Democratic	March 7 – September 3, 1837	25th Congress
	William R. King	Alabama	Democratic	October 13 – December 3, 1837	25th Congress
	William R. King	Alabama	Democratic	July 2 – December 18, 1838	25th Congress
	William R. King	Alabama	Democratic	February 25 – December 1, 1839	25th Congress
	William R. King	Alabama	Democratic	December 2–26, 1839	26th Congress
	William R. King	Alabama	Democratic	July – December 15, 1840	26th Congress
	William R. King	Alabama	Democratic	March 3, 1841	26th Congress
	William R. King	Alabama	Democratic	March 4, 1841	27th Congress
	Samuel Southard (Note: Served during a vacancy in the vice presidency, April 4, 1841–March 4, 1845, after John Tyler succeeded to the presidency.)	New Jersey	Whig	March 11, 1841 – May 31, 1842	27th Congress
	Willie P. Mangum	North Carolina	Whig	May 31, 1842 – December 3, 1843	27th Congress
	Willie P. Mangum	North Carolina	Whig	December 4, 1843 – March 3, 1845	28th Congress
	Willie P. Mangum	North Carolina	Whig	March 4, 1845	29th Congress
	Ambrose H. Sevier (Note: Ambrose H. Sevier was not elected as president pro tempore in an official manner, but permitted to occupy the chair for the day.)	Arkansas	Democratic	December 27, 1845	29th Congress
	David R. Atchison	Missouri	Democratic	August 8 – December 6, 1846	29th Congress
	David R. Atchison	Missouri	Democratic	January 11–13, 1847	29th Congress
	David R. Atchison	Missouri	Democratic	March 3 – December 5, 1847	29th Congress
	David R. Atchison	Missouri	Democratic	February 2–8, 1848	30th Congress
	David R. Atchison	Missouri	Democratic	June 1–14, 1848	30th Congress
	David R. Atchison	Missouri	Democratic	June 26 – July 29, 1848	30th Congress
	David R. Atchison	Missouri	Democratic	July 29 – December 4, 1848	30th Congress
	David R. Atchison	Missouri	Democratic	December 26, 1848 – January 1, 1849	30th Congress
	David R. Atchison	Missouri	Democratic	March 2–4, 1849	30th Congress
	David R. Atchison	Missouri	Democratic	March 5, 1849	31st Congress
	David R. Atchison	Missouri	Democratic	March 16 – December 2, 1849	31st Congress
	William R. King (Note: Served during a vacancy in the vice presidency, July 9, 1850–March 4, 1853, after Millard Fillmore succeeded to the presidency.)	Alabama	Democratic	May 6–19, 1850	31st Congress
	William R. King	Alabama	Democratic	July 11, 1850 – March 3, 1851	31st Congress
	William R. King	Alabama	Democratic	March 4, 1851 – December 20, 1852	32nd Congress
	David R. Atchison (Note: Served during a vacancy in the vice presidency, April 18, 1853–March 4, 1857, following the death of William R. King.)	Missouri	Democratic	December 20, 1852 – March 3, 1853	32nd Congress
	David R. Atchison	Missouri	Democratic	March 4, 1853 – December 4, 1854	33rd Congress
	Lewis Cass	Michigan	Democratic	December 4, 1854	33rd Congress
	Jesse D. Bright	Indiana	Democratic	December 5, 1854 – December 2, 1855	33rd Congress
	Jesse D. Bright	Indiana	Democratic	December 5, 1855 –June 9, 1856	34th Congress
	Charles E. Stuart	Michigan	Democratic	June 9–10, 1856	34th Congress
	Jesse D. Bright	Indiana	Democratic	June 11, 1856 – January 6, 1857	34th Congress
	James M. Mason	Virginia	Democratic	January 6 – March 3, 1857	34th Congress
	James M. Mason	Virginia	Democratic	March 4, 1857	35th Congress
	Thomas J. Rusk	Texas	Democratic	March 14 – July 29, 1857	35th Congress
	Benjamin Fitzpatrick	Alabama	Democratic	December 7–20, 1857	35th Congress
	Benjamin Fitzpatrick	Alabama	Democratic	March 29 – May 2, 1858	35th Congress
	Benjamin Fitzpatrick	Alabama	Democratic	June 14 – December 5, 1858	35th Congress
	Benjamin Fitzpatrick	Alabama	Democratic	January 19, 1859	35th Congress
	Benjamin Fitzpatrick	Alabama	Democratic	January 25 – February 9, 1859	35th Congress
	Benjamin Fitzpatrick	Alabama	Democratic	March 9 – December 4, 1859	36th Congress
	Benjamin Fitzpatrick	Alabama	Democratic	December 19, 1859 – January 15, 1860	36th Congress
	Benjamin Fitzpatrick	Alabama	Democratic	February 20–26, 1860	36th Congress
	Jesse D. Bright	Indiana	Democratic	June 12–26, 1860	36th Congress
	Benjamin Fitzpatrick	Alabama	Democratic	June 26 – December 2, 1860	36th Congress
	Solomon Foot	Vermont	Republican	February 16–17, 1861	36th Congress
	Solomon Foot	Vermont	Republican	March 23 – July 3, 1861	37th Congress
	Solomon Foot	Vermont	Republican	July 18 – December 1, 1861	37th Congress
	Solomon Foot	Vermont	Republican	January 15, 1862	37th Congress
	Solomon Foot	Vermont	Republican	March 31 – May 21, 1862	37th Congress
	Solomon Foot	Vermont	Republican	June 19 – December 12, 1862	37th Congress
	Solomon Foot	Vermont	Republican	February 18 – March 3, 1863	37th Congress
	Solomon Foot	Vermont	Republican	March 4 – December 6, 1863	38th Congress
	Solomon Foot	Vermont	Republican	December 18–20, 1863	38th Congress
	Solomon Foot	Vermont	Republican	February 23, 1864	38th Congress
	Solomon Foot	Vermont	Republican	March 11–13, 1864	38th Congress
	Solomon Foot	Vermont	Republican	April 11–13, 1864	38th Congress
	Daniel Clark	New Hampshire	Republican	April 26, 1864 – January 4, 1865	38th Congress
	Daniel Clark	New Hampshire	Republican	February 9–19, 1865	38th Congress
	Lafayette S. Foster (Note: Served during a vacancy in the vice presidency, April 15, 1865–March 4, 1869, after Andrew Johnson succeeded to presidency.)	Connecticut	Republican	March 7, 1865 – March 2, 1867	39th Congress
	Benjamin F. Wade	Ohio	Republican	March 2–3, 1867	39th Congress
	Benjamin F. Wade	Ohio	Republican	March 4, 1867 – March 3, 1869	40th Congress
	Henry B. Anthony	Rhode Island	Republican	March 23–28, 1869	41st Congress
	Henry B. Anthony	Rhode Island	Republican	April 9 – December 5, 1869	41st Congress
	Henry B. Anthony	Rhode Island	Republican	May 28 – June 2, 1870	41st Congress
	Henry B. Anthony	Rhode Island	Republican	July 1–5, 1870	41st Congress
	Henry B. Anthony	Rhode Island	Republican	July 14 – December 4, 1870	41st Congress
	Henry B. Anthony	Rhode Island	Republican	March 10–12, 1871	42nd Congress
	Henry B. Anthony	Rhode Island	Republican	April 17 – May 9, 1871	42nd Congress
	Henry B. Anthony	Rhode Island	Republican	May 23 – December 3, 1871	42nd Congress
	Henry B. Anthony	Rhode Island	Republican	December 21, 1871 – January 7, 1872	42nd Congress
	Henry B. Anthony	Rhode Island	Republican	February 23–25, 1872	42nd Congress
	Henry B. Anthony	Rhode Island	Republican	June 8 – December 1, 1872	42nd Congress
	Henry B. Anthony	Rhode Island	Republican	December 4–8, 1872	42nd Congress
	Henry B. Anthony	Rhode Island	Republican	December 13–15, 1872	42nd Congress
	Henry B. Anthony	Rhode Island	Republican	December 20, 1872 – January 5, 1873	42nd Congress
	Henry B. Anthony	Rhode Island	Republican	January 24, 1873	42nd Congress
	Matthew H. Carpenter	Wisconsin	Republican	March 12–13, 1873	43rd Congress
	Matthew H. Carpenter	Wisconsin	Republican	March 26 – November 30, 1873	43rd Congress
	Matthew H. Carpenter	Wisconsin	Republican	December 11, 1873 – December 6, 1874	43rd Congress
	Matthew H. Carpenter	Wisconsin	Republican	December 23, 1874 – January 4, 1875	43rd Congress
	Henry B. Anthony	Rhode Island	Republican	January 25–31, 1875	43rd Congress
	Henry B. Anthony	Rhode Island	Republican	February 15–17, 1875	43rd Congress
	Thomas W. Ferry (Note: Served during a vacancy in the vice presidency, November 22, 1875–March 4, 1877, following the death of Henry Wilson.)	Michigan	Republican	March 9–10, 1875	44th Congress
	Thomas W. Ferry	Michigan	Republican	March 19 – December 20, 1875	44th Congress
	Thomas W. Ferry	Michigan	Republican	December 20, 1875 – March 4, 1877	44th Congress
	Thomas W. Ferry	Michigan	Republican	March 5, 1877	45th Congress
	Thomas W. Ferry	Michigan	Republican	February 26 – March 3, 1878	45th Congress
	Thomas W. Ferry	Michigan	Republican	April 17 – December 1, 1878	45th Congress
	Thomas W. Ferry	Michigan	Republican	March 3–17, 1879	45th Congress
	Allen G. Thurman	Ohio	Democratic	April 15 – November 30, 1879	46th Congress
	Allen G. Thurman	Ohio	Democratic	April 7–14, 1880	46th Congress
	Allen G. Thurman	Ohio	Democratic	May 6 – December 5, 1880	46th Congress
	Thomas F. Bayard, Sr. (Note: Served during a vacancy in the vice presidency, September 19, 1881–March 4, 1885, after Chester A. Arthur succeeded to presidency.)	Delaware	Democratic	October 10–13, 1881	47th Congress
	David Davis	Illinois	Independent	October 13, 1881 – March 3, 1883	47th Congress
	George F. Edmunds	Vermont	Republican	March 3 – December 2, 1883	47th Congress
	George F. Edmunds	Vermont	Republican	December 3, 1883 – January 14, 1884	48th Congress
	George F. Edmunds	Vermont	Republican	January 14, 1884 – March 3, 1885	48th Congress
	John Sherman (Note: Served during a vacancy in the vice presidency, November 25, 1885–March 4, 1889, following the death of Thomas A. Hendricks.)	Ohio	Republican	December 7, 1885 – February 26, 1887	49th Congress
	John J. Ingalls	Kansas	Republican	February 26 – December 4, 1887	49th Congress
	John J. Ingalls	Kansas	Republican	December 5, 1887 – March 3, 1889	50th Congress
	John J. Ingalls	Kansas	Republican	March 7–17, 1889	51st Congress
	John J. Ingalls	Kansas	Republican	April 2 – December 1, 1889	51st Congress
	John J. Ingalls	Kansas	Republican	December 5–10, 1889	51st Congress
	John J. Ingalls	Kansas	Republican	February 28 – March 18, 1890	51st Congress
	John J. Ingalls	Kansas	Republican	April 3, 1890 – March 2, 1891	51st Congress
	Charles F. Manderson	Nebraska	Republican	March 2 – December 6, 1891	51st Congress
	Charles F. Manderson	Nebraska	Republican	December 7, 1891 – March 3, 1893	52nd Congress
	Charles F. Manderson	Nebraska	Republican	March 4–22, 1893	53rd Congress
	Isham G. Harris	Tennessee	Democratic	March 22, 1893 – January 7, 1895	53rd Congress
	Matt W. Ransom	North Carolina	Democratic	January 7–10, 1895	53rd Congress
	Isham G. Harris	Tennessee	Democratic	January 10 – March 3, 1895	53rd Congress
	William P. Frye (Note: Served during a vacancy in the vice presidency, November 21, 1899–March 4, 1901, following the death of Garret Hobart.) (Note: Served during a vacancy in the vice presidency, September 14, 1901–March 4, 1905, after Theodore Roosevelt succeeded to presidency.)	Maine	Republican	February 7, 1896 – March 3, 1897	54th Congress
	William P. Frye	Maine	Republican	March 4, 1897 – December 3, 1899	55th Congress
	William P. Frye	Maine	Republican	December 4, 1899 – March 3, 1901	56th Congress
	William P. Frye	Maine	Republican	March 7, 1901 – March 4, 1903	57th Congress
	William P. Frye	Maine	Republican	March 5, 1903 – March 3, 1905	58th Congress
	William P. Frye	Maine	Republican	March 4, 1905 – March 3, 1907	59th Congress
	William P. Frye	Maine	Republican	December 5, 1907 – March 3, 1909	60th Congress
	William P. Frye	Maine	Republican	March 4, 1909 – March 3, 1911	61st Congress
	William P. Frye	Maine	Republican	March 4–27, 1911	62nd Congress
	Augustus O. Bacon	Georgia	Democratic	August 14, 1911	62nd Congress
	Charles Curtis	Kansas	Republican	December 4–12, 1911	62nd Congress
	Augustus O. Bacon	Georgia	Democratic	January 15–17, 1912	62nd Congress
	Jacob H. Gallinger	New Hampshire	Republican	February 12–14, 1912	62nd Congress
	Augustus O. Bacon	Georgia	Democratic	March 11–12, 1912	62nd Congress
	Frank B. Brandegee	Connecticut	Republican	March 25–26, 1912	62nd Congress
	Augustus O. Bacon	Georgia	Democratic	April 8, 1912	62nd Congress
	Jacob H. Gallinger	New Hampshire	Republican	April 26–27, 1912; May 7, 1912	62nd Congress
	Augustus O. Bacon	Georgia	Democratic	May 10, 1912	62nd Congress
	Henry Cabot Lodge	Massachusetts	Republican	May 25, 1912	62nd Congress
	Augustus O. Bacon	Georgia	Democratic	May 30 – June 3, 1912; June 13 – July 5, 1912	62nd Congress
	Jacob H. Gallinger	New Hampshire	Republican	July 6–31, 1912	62nd Congress
	Augustus O. Bacon	Georgia	Democratic	August 1–10, 1912	62nd Congress
	Jacob H. Gallinger	New Hampshire	Republican	August 12–26, 1912	62nd Congress
	Augustus O. Bacon (Note: Served during a vacancy in the vice presidency, October 30, 1912–March 4, 1913, following the death of James S. Sherman.)	Georgia	Democratic	August 27 – December 15, 1912	62nd Congress
	Jacob H. Gallinger	New Hampshire	Republican	December 16, 1912, and January 4, 1913	62nd Congress
	Augustus O. Bacon	Georgia	Democratic	January 5–18, 1913	62nd Congress
	Jacob H. Gallinger	New Hampshire	Republican	January 19 – February 1, 1913	62nd Congress
	Augustus O. Bacon	Georgia	Democratic	February 2–15, 1913	62nd Congress
	Jacob H. Gallinger	New Hampshire	Republican	February 16 – March 3, 1913	62nd Congress
	James Paul Clarke	Arkansas	Democratic	March 13, 1913 – March 3, 1915	63rd Congress
	James Paul Clarke	Arkansas	Democratic	December 6, 1915 – October 1, 1916	64th Congress
	Willard Saulsbury Jr.	Delaware	Democratic	December 14, 1916 – March 4, 1917	64th Congress
	Willard Saulsbury Jr.	Delaware	Democratic	March 5, 1917 – March 3, 1919	65th Congress
	Albert B. Cummins (Note: Served during a vacancy in the vice presidency, August 2, 1923–March 4, 1925, after Calvin Coolidge succeeded to presidency.)	Iowa	Republican	May 19, 1919 – March 3, 1921	66th Congress
	Albert B. Cummins	Iowa	Republican	March 7, 1921 – December 2, 1923	67th Congress
	Albert B. Cummins	Iowa	Republican	December 3, 1923 – March 3, 1925	68th Congress
	Albert B. Cummins	Iowa	Republican	March 4–6, 1925	69th Congress
	George H. Moses	New Hampshire	Republican	March 6, 1925 – March 4, 1927	69th Congress
	George H. Moses	New Hampshire	Republican	December 15, 1927 – March 3, 1929	70th Congress
	George H. Moses	New Hampshire	Republican	March 4, 1929 – December 6, 1931	71st Congress
	George H. Moses	New Hampshire	Republican	December 7, 1931 – March 3, 1933	72nd Congress
	Key Pittman	Nevada	Democratic	March 9, 1933 – January 2, 1935	73rd Congress
	Key Pittman	Nevada	Democratic	January 7, 1935 – January 4, 1937	74th Congress
	Key Pittman	Nevada	Democratic	January 5, 1937 – January 2, 1939	75th Congress
	Key Pittman	Nevada	Democratic	January 3, 1939 – November 10, 1940	76th Congress
	William H. King	Utah	Democratic	November 19, 1940 – January 3, 1941	76th Congress
	Pat Harrison	Mississippi	Democratic	January 6 – June 22, 1941	77th Congress
	Carter Glass	Virginia	Democratic	July 10, 1941 – January 5, 1943	77th Congress
	Carter Glass	Virginia	Democratic	January 14, 1943 – January 2, 1945	78th Congress
	Kenneth McKellar (Note: Served during a vacancy in the vice presidency, April 12, 1945–January 20, 1949, after Harry S. Truman succeeded to presidency.)	Tennessee	Democratic	January 6, 1945 – January 2, 1947	79th Congress
	Arthur H. Vandenberg	Michigan	Republican	January 4, 1947 – January 2, 1949	80th Congress
	Kenneth McKellar	Tennessee	Democratic	January 3, 1949 – January 2, 1951	81st Congress
	Kenneth McKellar	Tennessee	Democratic	January 3, 1951 – January 2, 1953	82nd Congress
	Styles Bridges	New Hampshire	Republican	January 3, 1953 – January 4, 1955	83rd Congress
	Walter F. George	Georgia	Democratic	January 5, 1955 – January 2, 1957	84th Congress
	Carl Hayden (Note: Served during a vacancy in the vice presidency, November 22, 1963–January 20, 1965, after Lyndon B. Johnson succeeded to presidency.)	Arizona	Democratic	January 3, 1957 – January 6, 1959	85th Congress
	Carl Hayden	Arizona	Democratic	January 7, 1959 – January 2, 1961	86th Congress
	Carl Hayden	Arizona	Democratic	January 3, 1961 – January 8, 1963	87th Congress
	Carl Hayden	Arizona	Democratic	January 9, 1963 – January 3, 1965	88th Congress
	Carl Hayden	Arizona	Democratic	January 4, 1965 – January 9, 1967	89th Congress
	Carl Hayden	Arizona	Democratic	January 10, 1967 – January 2, 1969	90th Congress
	Richard Russell Jr.	Georgia	Democratic	January 3, 1969 – January 3, 1971	91st Congress
	Richard Russell Jr.	Georgia	Democratic	January 3, 1971 – January 21, 1971	92nd Congress
	Allen J. Ellender	Louisiana	Democratic	January 22, 1971 – July 27, 1972	92nd Congress
	James Eastland (Note: Served during a vacancy in the vice presidency, October 10, 1973–December 6, 1973, following the resignation of Spiro Agnew.) (Note: Served during a vacancy in the vice presidency, August 9, 1974–December 19, 1974, after Gerald Ford succeeded to presidency.)	Mississippi	Democratic	July 28, 1972 – January 2, 1973	92nd Congress
	James Eastland	Mississippi	Democratic	January 3, 1973 – January 13, 1975	93rd Congress
	James Eastland	Mississippi	Democratic	January 14, 1975 – January 3, 1977	94th Congress
	James Eastland	Mississippi	Democratic	January 4, 1977 – December 27, 1978	95th Congress
	Warren Magnuson	Washington	Democratic	January 15, 1979 – December 4, 1980	96th Congress
	Milton Young	North Dakota	Republican	December 5, 1980	96th Congress
	Warren Magnuson	Washington	Democratic	December 6, 1980 – January 4, 1981	96th Congress
	Strom Thurmond	South Carolina	Republican	January 5, 1981 – January 2, 1983	97th Congress
	Strom Thurmond	South Carolina	Republican	January 3, 1983 – January 2, 1985	98th Congress
	Strom Thurmond	South Carolina	Republican	January 3, 1985 – January 5, 1987	99th Congress
	John C. Stennis	Mississippi	Democratic	January 6, 1987 – January 3, 1989	100th Congress
	Robert Byrd	West Virginia	Democratic	January 3, 1989 – January 2, 1991	101st Congress
	Robert Byrd	West Virginia	Democratic	January 3, 1991 – January 4, 1993	102nd Congress
	Robert Byrd	West Virginia	Democratic	January 5, 1993 – January 3, 1995	103rd Congress
	Strom Thurmond	South Carolina	Republican	January 4, 1995 – January 6, 1997	104th Congress
	Strom Thurmond	South Carolina	Republican	January 7, 1997 – January 6, 1999	105th Congress
	Strom Thurmond	South Carolina	Republican	January 7, 1999 – January 3, 2001	106th Congress
	Robert Byrd	West Virginia	Democratic	January 3–20, 2001	107th Congress
	Strom Thurmond	South Carolina	Republican	January 20 – June 6, 2001	107th Congress
	Robert Byrd	West Virginia	Democratic	June 6, 2001 – January 3, 2003	107th Congress
	Ted Stevens	Alaska	Republican	January 3, 2003 – January 3, 2005	108th Congress
	Ted Stevens	Alaska	Republican	January 3, 2005 – January 4, 2007	109th Congress
	Robert Byrd	West Virginia	Democratic	January 4, 2007 – January 3, 2009	110th Congress
	Robert Byrd	West Virginia	Democratic	January 3, 2009 – June 28, 2010	111th Congress
	Daniel Inouye	Hawaii	Democratic	June 28, 2010 – January 5, 2011	111th Congress
	Daniel Inouye	Hawaii	Democratic	January 5, 2011 – December 17, 2012	112th Congress
	Patrick Leahy	Vermont	Democratic	December 17, 2012 – January 3, 2013	112th Congress
	Patrick Leahy	Vermont	Democratic	January 3, 2013 – January 3, 2015	113th Congress
	Orrin Hatch	Utah	Republican	January 3, 2015 – January 3, 2017	114th Congress
	Orrin Hatch	Utah	Republican	January 3, 2017 – January 3, 2019	115th Congress
	Chuck Grassley	Iowa	Republican	January 3, 2019 – January 3, 2021	116th Congress
	Chuck Grassley	Iowa	Republican	January 3, 2021 – January 20, 2021	117th Congress
	Patrick Leahy	Vermont	Democratic	January 20, 2021 – January 3, 2023	117th Congress
	Patty Murray	Washington	Democratic	January 3, 2023 – January 3, 2025	118th Congress
	Chuck Grassley	Iowa	Republican	January 3, 2025 – present	119th Congress

== President pro tempore emeritus ==
In 2001, the honorary title of president pro tempore emeritus was created. It has subsequently been bestowed upon a senator of the minority party who has previously served as president pro tempore.

Portrait	Name	State	Party	Term	Congress
	Strom Thurmond	South Carolina	Republican	June 6, 2001 – January 3, 2003	107th Congress
	Robert Byrd	West Virginia	Democratic	January 3, 2003 – January 3, 2007	108th Congress; 109th Congress
	Ted Stevens	Alaska	Republican	January 3, 2007 – January 3, 2009	110th Congress
Vacant January 3, 2009 – January 3, 2015 (No senator was eligible for the position.)					111th Congress; 112th Congress; 113th Congress
	Patrick Leahy	Vermont	Democratic	January 3, 2015 – January 20, 2021	114th Congress; 115th Congress; 116th Congress; 117th Congress
	Chuck Grassley	Iowa	Republican	January 20, 2021 – January 3, 2025	117th Congress; 118th Congress
	Patty Murray	Washington	Democratic	January 3, 2025 – present	119th Congress

== See also ==
- Dean of the United States Senate
- History of the United States Senate
- Seniority in the United States Senate
- List of current presidents of legislatures, presiding officers of legislative assemblies worldwide
