= Parliamentary leader =

Political title of the person leading a parliamentary group

A parliamentary leader is a political title or a descriptive term used in various countries to designate the person leading a parliamentary group or caucus in a legislative body, whether it be a national or sub-national legislature. They are their party's most senior member of parliament (MP) in most parliamentary democracies.

A party leader may be the same person as the parliamentary leader, or the roles may be separated.

== Terminology ==
In many countries, the position of leader of a political party (that is, the organisational leader) and leader of a parliamentary group are separate positions, and while they are often held by the same person, this is not always or automatically the case. If the party leader is a member of the government, holds a different political office outside the parliamentary body in question, or no political office at all, the position of parliamentary leader is frequently held by a different person.

In English, the leader may be referred to as a "parliamentary chairman", "group leader", "floor leader", "caucus leader" or simply "parliamentary leader", among other names.

== Examples ==
=== Parliamentary systems ===
==== Australia and New Zealand ====
In Australian and New Zealand politics, the party figure commonly described as "leader" is usually an MP responsible for managing the party's business within parliament. Party constitutions will typically distinguish between the parliamentary leader and the organisational leader (who typically is outside of parliament), with the latter often termed a "federal president" or "party president". The two roles are organisationally distinct even if close cooperation is expected. While the Australian Senate has its own parliamentary leaders, Senate members may also serve as members of the cabinet (or frontbench team) of their respective party as led by a member of parliament.

==== Canada ====
A parliamentary leader is chosen in Canadian politics to lead their caucus in a legislative body, whether it be the House of Commons or a provincial legislature. They serve as interim legislative leaders, when a party leader either has no seat in the legislative body, during a transition period preceding, or following a leadership contest.

==== European Parliament ====
Each of the seven political groups of the European Parliament has its own group leader. The groups within the European Parliament are often very broad, so the position of the group leader is a unifying one—they may help to consolidate MEPs with similar outlooks ahead of important votes. The groups are organisationally separate from a European political party, and multiple parties often ally as a single group, thus the distinction between a party and a parliamentary leader is usually strict.

==== Germany ====
In German politics, leaders of the major parties have often been heads of government of the various states rather than members of the national parliament. Hence, the position of parliamentary leader in the federal parliament (Germany also has 16 state parliaments) is often occupied by a different person. The parliamentary leader has the supreme responsibility for coordinating the work of the MPs representing their party. Even when the party leader is a member of the national parliament, the parliamentary leader can be a different person. For instance, Friedrich Merz was parliamentary leader while Angela Merkel was party leader for some years while the CDU was in opposition. If the party leader is the chancellor or a member of the government, another person always is the parliamentary leader.

==== Netherlands ====
In both houses of the Dutch parliament, parliamentary leaders are formally elected by their peers in the parliamentary group.

In the House of Representatives, leaders of opposition parties are also their parties' parliamentary leader. Leaders of coalition parties might choose to enter the cabinet, serving as prime minister if their party is the largest in the coalition or otherwise as deputy prime minister. Otherwise they remain parliamentary leaders.

==== United Kingdom ====
In British politics, the leader of a party is typically the same person as the parliamentary leader. The leader may not fully control the party bureaucracy. The leader may be chosen by members of parliament (MPs) from among their number, or elected by the wider party membership at a party conference, but once elected must retain the support of the parliamentary party. Similarly, the position of prime minister may be given to the parliamentary leader (the party leader, in the case of the two major parties) of the largest political party in parliament, with the expectation they will be able secure and retain the confidence of a majority of MPs.

Some smaller parties have parliamentary leaders in the national parliament (in Westminster) who are separate from the party leaders—the party leader may hold office in a devolved (sub-national) parliament or assembly. The party leader of the Scottish nationalist SNP is John Swinney, who serves as first minister of Scotland, and does not sit at Westminster. The parliamentary group of the SNP at the Westminster parliament is led by SNP MP Dave Doogan.

=== Presidential systems ===
==== Palau ====
The legislatures of most Palauan states have a floor leader (equivalent to a parliamentary leader). So does the Senate and House of Delegates.

==== Philippines ====
In the Philippines, each body of the bicameral Congress has a majority floor leader and a minority floor leader. For the Senate, there is the majority floor leader of the Senate and the minority floor leader of the Senate. For the House of Representatives there is the majority floor leader of the House and the minority floor leader of the House. Officeholders do not represent political parties but rather political groupings within each body.

==== United States ====
===== Senate =====
In the United States Senate, they are elected by their respective party conferences to serve as the chief Senate spokespeople for their parties and to manage and schedule the legislative and executive business of the Senate. By custom, the presiding officer (officially the Vice President, in their role as President of the Senate, or the President pro tempore, who is usually the most senior U.S. senator in the majority party and typically serves in the Vice President's absence) gives the floor leaders priority in obtaining recognition to speak on the floor of the Senate.

In the Senate's two-party system, the floor leaders are the spokespeople from both major parties, elected by their parties. They also serve essentially as executives of their parties within the Senate. The floor leaders are referred to as the Senate majority leader, who belongs to the party with the most senators, and the Senate minority leader, who belongs to the other major party.

===== House of Representatives =====
Similar positions exist in the United States House of Representatives, except that the role of House Majority Leader normally goes to the second-highest member of the leadership of the majority party, because it traditionally elects its party leader to the position of Speaker. In contrast House Minority Leader serves as floor leader of the "loyal opposition," and is the minority counterpart to the Speaker.

===== State legislatures and city councils =====
Similar positions exist for state legislatures as for both houses of Congress. In addition, "governor's floor leaders" or "administration floor leaders" may be selected by the governor in both houses of several states' legislatures to guide and advocate for the governor's legislative agenda. Historically, Governor's floor leaders have been selected in Georgia, Louisiana, Illinois, Tennessee, Alabama and California. "Mayor's floor leaders" have also been historically appointed in the city councils of Chicago, Baltimore, and Houston.

== See also ==
- Frontbencher
- Majority leader
- Minority leader
