= Newell Sanders =

American politician (1850–1939)

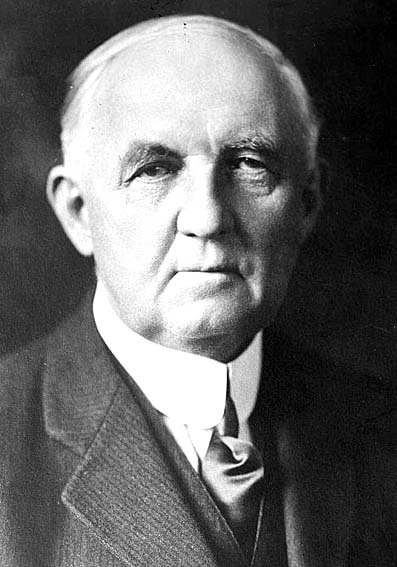

United States Senator from Tennessee
- In office April 11, 1912 – January 24, 1913
- Appointed by: Ben W. Hooper
- Preceded by: Robert L. Taylor
- Succeeded by: William R. Webb

Personal details
- Born: July 12, 1850 Bloomington, Indiana
- Died: January 26, 1939 (aged 88) Lookout Mountain, Tennessee
- Party: Republican

Newell Sanders (July 12, 1850 – January 26, 1939) was a Chattanooga businessman who served for a relatively brief time as a United States senator from Tennessee.

== Life and career ==
Sanders was born in Owen County, Indiana, the son of Miriam (Coffey) and John Sanders. He attended Indiana University Bloomington, where he was graduated in 1873 and operated a bookstore until 1877. During that year, he moved to Chattanooga and became involved in the manufacturing of farm implements. He served on the board of education 1881 – 1882 and as an alderman 1882 – 1886. He also served on the board of directors of the Nashville, Chattanooga and St. Louis Railway.

When Democratic U.S. Senator Robert Love Taylor died in office, Tennessee Governor Ben W. Hooper, a Republican, appointed Sanders to the vacancy. Sanders was sworn in in April 1911 and served until February 1913 when the Tennessee General Assembly elected educator William R. Webb, a Democrat, to succeed him, the process called for in the United States Constitution until the Seventeenth Amendment was ratified later in the decade. During his somewhat abbreviated service, Sanders nonetheless served as chair of the Senate Committee on National Banks. Sanders was the last Republican to serve as U.S. Senator from Tennessee until the election of Howard H. Baker Jr. over five decades later. He was, furthermore, the last Republican U.S. Senator from a former Confederate state prior to the election of John Tower of Texas in 1961 (a gap of 48 years).

After his service in the Senate, Sanders returned to his manufacturing interests until his retirement in 1927. In 1922 he ran for popular election to the United States Senate, and received 32 percent of the vote against Democratic incumbent Kenneth McKellar. Sanders died at his home in Lookout Mountain, Tennessee, and was buried in Chattanooga's Forest Hills Cemetery.

== Notes ==
Party political offices
Preceded by Ben W. Hooper	Republican nominee for U.S. Senator from Tennessee (Class 1); 1922	Succeeded by James Alexander Fowler
U.S. Senate
Preceded by Robert Love Taylor	U.S. senator (Class 2) from Tennessee; April 11, 1912 – January 24, 1913; Served alongside: Luke Lea	Succeeded by William R. Webb
Honorary titles
Preceded by Elihu Root	Oldest living U.S. senator February 7, 1937 – January 26, 1938	Succeeded by Obadiah Gardner
