= 1946 United States Senate election in Tennessee =

- November 5, 1946
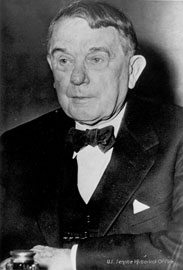

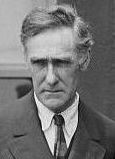
Nominee	Kenneth McKellar	William B. Ladd	John Randolph Neal Jr.
Party	Democratic	Republican	Independent
Popular vote	145,654	57,237	11,516
Percentage	66.60%	26.17%	5.27%
- County results McKellar: 40–50% 50–60% 60–70% 70–80% 80–90% >90% Ladd: 40–50% 50–60% 60–70%
U.S. senator before election
Kenneth McKellar
Democratic
Elected U.S. senator
Kenneth McKellar
Democratic

The 1946 United States Senate election in Tennessee was held on November 5, 1946. Incumbent Democratic Senator Kenneth D. McKellar was re-elected to a sixth term in office. He defeated a primary challenge by Edward W. Carmack Jr. and easily won the general election against Republican William B. Ladd, and Independent candidate John Randolph Neal Jr.

== Democratic primary ==
=== Candidates ===
- Edward W. Carmack Jr., candidate for Senate in 1942 and son of former Senator Edward W. Carmack
- Byron Johnson
- Kenneth McKellar, incumbent Senator since 1917 and President pro tempore of the U.S. Senate
- John Randolph Neal Jr., attorney, academic, and perennial candidate
- Herman H. Ross

=== Results ===
1946 Democratic Senate primary
Party	Candidate	Votes	%
Democratic	Kenneth McKellar (incumbent)	188,805	61.95%
Democratic	Edward W. Carmack Jr.	107,363	35.23%
Democratic	John Randolph Neal Jr.	3,130	1.03%
Democratic	Herman H. Ross	2,995	0.98%
Democratic	Byron Johnson	2,495	0.82%
Total votes		304,788	100.00%

== General election ==
=== Candidates ===
- William B. Ladd (Republican)
- Kenneth McKellar, incumbent Senator since 1917 (Democratic)
- John Randolph Neal Jr., attorney, academic, and perennial candidate (Independent)
- Herman H. Ross (Independent)

=== Results ===
1946 U.S. Senate election in Tennessee
Party	Candidate	Votes	%	±%
Democratic	Kenneth McKellar (incumbent)	145,654	66.60%	▼3.80
Republican	William B. Ladd	57,237	26.17%	▼3.02
Independent	John Randolph Neal Jr.	11,516	5.27%	▲5.26
Independent	Herman H. Ross	4,303	1.97%	N/A
Total votes		218,710	100.00%	N/A
Democratic hold				

== See also ==
- 1946 United States Senate elections
