= 1922 United States Senate election in Tennessee =

- November 7, 1922
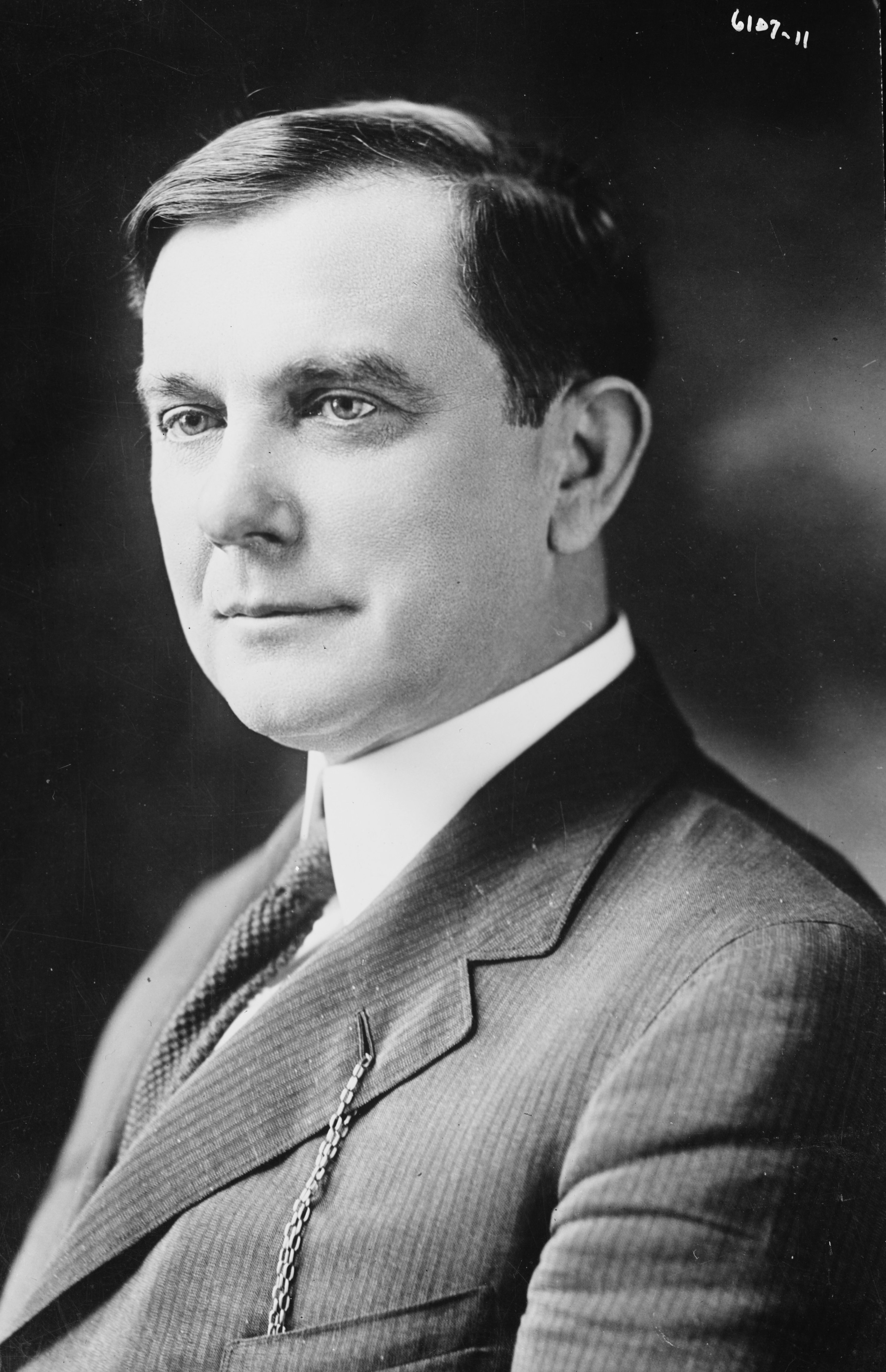

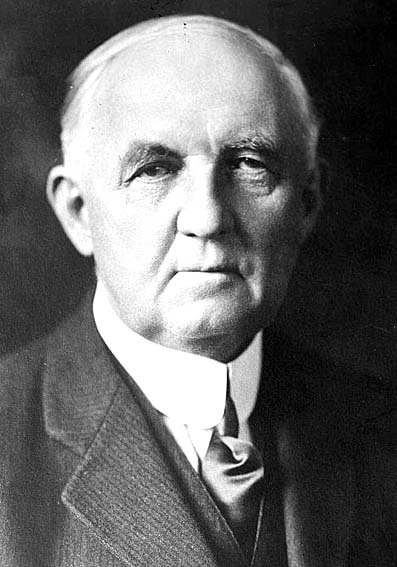
Nominee	Kenneth McKellar	Newell Sanders
Party	Democratic	Republican
Popular vote	151,523	71,199
Percentage	68.03%	31.97%
- County results McKellar: 50–60% 60–70% 70–80% 80–90% >90% Sanders: 50–60% 60–70% 70–80%
U.S. senator before election
Kenneth McKellar
Democratic
Elected U.S. senator
Kenneth McKellar
Democratic

The 1922 United States Senate election in Tennessee was held on November 7, 1922. Incumbent Democratic Senator Kenneth D. McKellar was re-elected to a second term in office, defeating Republican former interim Senator Newell Sanders.

== General election ==
=== Candidates ===
- Kenneth McKellar, incumbent Senator since 1917 (Democratic)
- Newell Sanders, businessman and former interim U.S. Senator (1912–1913) (Republican)

=== Results ===
1922 U.S. Senate election in Tennessee
Party	Candidate	Votes	%	±%
Democratic	Kenneth McKellar (incumbent)	151,523	68.03%	▲15.61
Republican	Newell Sanders	71,199	31.97%	▼15.61
Total votes		222,722	100.00%	N/A
Democratic hold				

== See also ==
- 1922 United States Senate elections
