= Presiding officer of the United States Senate =

Person who presides over the U.S. Senate

The presiding officer of the United States Senate is charged with maintaining order and decorum, recognizing members to speak, and interpreting the Senate's rules, practices, and precedents. The role of presiding officer may be performed by one of three officials: the vice president of the United States; an elected United States senator (president pro tempore, who fills in the role in the event of an incapacity or vacancy); or, under certain circumstances, the chief justice of the United States. If the Senate convenes with neither the vice president nor a president pro tempore (as with William R. King's absence in 1853), the Secretary or Assistant Secretary supervises election of a president pro tempore. Outside the constitutionally mandated roles, the appointment of a person to do the job of presiding over the Senate as a body is governed by Rule I of the Standing Rules.

The United States Constitution establishes the vice president as president of the Senate, with the authority to cast a tie-breaking vote. Early vice presidents took an active role in regularly presiding over proceedings of the body, with the president pro tempore only being called on during the vice president's absence. During the 20th century, the role of the vice president evolved into more of an executive branch position. Now, the vice president is usually seen as an integral part of a president's administration and presides over the Senate only on ceremonial occasions or when a tie-breaking vote may be needed.

The Constitution also provides for the selection of a president pro tempore of the Senate, to preside when the vice president is absent from the body (as the meaning of pro tempore, literally "for the time being"). The Constitution does not specify who can serve in this position, but the Senate has always elected one of its current members. By tradition, the position is generally given to the most senior senator of the majority party. In actual practice in the modern Senate, the president pro tempore also does not often serve in the role (though it is their constitutional right to do so). Instead, as governed by Rule I, they frequently designate a junior senator to preside.

When the Senate hears an impeachment trial of the incumbent president of the United States, by the procedure established in the Constitution, the chief justice presides.

== Constitutional authority ==
The Constitution provides for two officers to preside over the Senate. Article One, Section 3, Clause 4 designates the vice president of the United States as the president of the Senate. In this capacity, the vice president was expected to preside at regular sessions of the Senate, casting votes only to break ties. From John Adams in 1789 to Richard Nixon in the 1950s, presiding over the Senate was the chief function of vice presidents, who had an office in the Capitol, received their staff support and office expenses through legislative appropriations, and rarely were invited to participate in cabinet meetings or other executive activities. In 1961, Vice President Lyndon B. Johnson changed the vice presidency by moving his chief office from the Capitol to the White House, by directing his attention to executive functions, and by attending Senate sessions only at critical times when his vote, or ruling from the chair, might be necessary. Vice presidents since Johnson's time have followed his example.

Next, Article One, Section 3, Clause 5 provides that in the absence of the vice president the Senate could choose a president pro tempore to temporarily preside and perform the duties of the chair. Since vice presidents presided routinely in the 18th and 19th centuries, the Senate thought it necessary to choose a president pro tempore only for the limited periods when the vice president might be ill or otherwise absent. As a result, the Senate frequently elected several presidents pro tempore during a single session.

On three occasions during the 19th century, the Senate was without both a president and a president pro tempore:

- July 9–11, 1850, following Millard Fillmore's accession to the presidency upon the death of Zachary Taylor, until William R. King was elected president pro tempore;
- September 19–October 10, 1881, following Chester A. Arthur's accession to the presidency upon the death of James A. Garfield, until Thomas F. Bayard was elected president pro tempore;
- November 25–December 7, 1885, following the death of Vice President Thomas A. Hendricks, until John Sherman was elected president pro tempore.

Additionally, Article One, Section 3, Clause 6 grants to the Senate the sole power to try federal impeachments and spells out the basic procedures for impeachment trials. Among the requirements is the stipulation that the Chief Justice of the United States is to preside over presidential impeachment trials. This rule aims, in part, to avoid the possible conflict of interest of a vice president presiding over the proceeding for the removal of the one official standing between the vice president and the presidency. The chief justice has presided as such only three times:

- Chief Justice Salmon P. Chase presided over the impeachment trial of Andrew Johnson in 1868;
- Chief Justice William H. Rehnquist presided over the impeachment trial of Bill Clinton in 1999;
- Chief Justice John Roberts presided over the first impeachment trial of Donald Trump in 2020.

According to Article One, Section 5, Clause 2 of the Constitution, the Senate is allowed to establish, for itself, its own rules, including the roles and duties of the presiding officer. Those rules are known as the Standing Rules of the United States Senate, and Rule I deals with the appointment of a person to act as the chair, or presiding officer, for normal Senate proceedings. It recognizes the constitutionally mandated roles of vice president and president pro tempore, but goes further to allow for the appointment of an acting president pro tempore, and further allows for the president pro tempore to also designate any other senator to perform his duties. As a result, during the day-to-day operation of the body, it is rare for the actual presiding role to be handled by the president pro tempore (and rarer still for the vice president to do so). Instead, a designated junior senator is most commonly appointed to do the job.

== Manner of address ==
The presiding officer is usually addressed as "Mr. President" or "Madam President." During impeachment trials of the president, the chief justice is referred to as "Mr. Chief Justice.”

During joint sessions of Congress in which the president of the United States is giving the address, practices have varied as to how the president of the United States refers to the vice president. It was the custom for earlier presidents up to George H. W. Bush to refer to the vice president as "Mr. President" while addressing a joint session of Congress, in deference to their role as president of the Senate. Every president since Bill Clinton has since addressed the vice president acting as Senate president as “Mr./Madam Vice President”.

== List of presiding officers ==
This list includes all presidents of the Senate (the vice presidents of the United States), those presidents pro tempore of the Senate who presided during intra–term vacancies in the vice presidency or when the vice president was acting as president of the United States, and those chief justices who presided during presidential impeachment trials. It does not include presidents pro tempore who presided over sessions temporarily during an absence of the Senate president, or junior senators designated by the president pro tempore to preside temporarily.

Portrait	Name	Term	Position
	John Langdon	April 6–21, 1789	President pro tempore
	John Adams	April 21, 1789 – March 4, 1797	President of the Senate
	Thomas Jefferson	March 4, 1797 – March 4, 1801	President of the Senate
	Aaron Burr	March 4, 1801 – March 4, 1805	President of the Senate
	George Clinton	March 4, 1805 – April 20, 1812	President of the Senate
	William H. Crawford	April 20, 1812 – March 4, 1813	President pro tempore
	Elbridge Gerry	March 4, 1813 – November 23, 1814	President of the Senate
	John Gaillard	November 25, 1814 – March 4, 1817	President pro tempore
	Daniel Tompkins	March 4, 1817 – March 4, 1825	President of the Senate
	John C. Calhoun	March 4, 1825 – December 28, 1832	President of the Senate
	Hugh Lawson White	December 28, 1832 – March 4, 1833	President pro tempore
	Martin Van Buren	March 4, 1833 – March 4, 1837	President of the Senate
	Richard Mentor Johnson	March 4, 1837 – March 4, 1841	President of the Senate
	John Tyler	March 4 – April 4, 1841	President of the Senate
	Samuel L. Southard	April 4, 1841 – May 31, 1842	President pro tempore
	Willie P. Mangum	May 31, 1842 – March 4, 1845	President pro tempore
	George M. Dallas	March 4, 1845 – March 4, 1849	President of the Senate
	Millard Fillmore	March 4, 1849 – July 9, 1850	President of the Senate
Vacant July 9–11, 1850 (Note: The Senate was without both a president and a president pro tempore following Millard Fillmore's accession to the presidency upon the death of Zachary Taylor, until William R. King was elected president pro tempore.)
	William R. King	July 11, 1850 – December 20, 1852	President pro tempore
	David Rice Atchison	December 20, 1852 – March 4, 1853	President pro tempore
	William R. King (Note: King never presided as vice president due to illness.)	March 4 – April 18, 1853	President of the Senate
	David Rice Atchison	April 18, 1853 – December 4, 1854	President pro tempore
	Lewis Cass	December 4, 1854	President pro tempore
	Jesse D. Bright	December 5, 1854 – June 9, 1856	President pro tempore
	Charles E. Stuart	June 9–10, 1856	President pro tempore
	Jesse D. Bright	June 11, 1856 – January 6, 1857	President pro tempore
	James Murray Mason	January 6 – March 4, 1857	President pro tempore
	John C. Breckinridge	March 4, 1857 – March 4, 1861	President of the Senate
	Hannibal Hamlin	March 4, 1861 – March 4, 1865	President of the Senate
	Andrew Johnson	March 4 – April 15, 1865	President of the Senate
	Lafayette S. Foster	April 15, 1865 – March 2, 1867	President pro tempore
	Benjamin Wade	March 2, 1867 – March 3, 1869	President pro tempore
	Salmon P. Chase	March 13 – May 26, 1868	Chief Justice (Impeachment trial of Andrew Johnson)
	Schuyler Colfax	March 4, 1869 – March 4, 1873	President of the Senate
	Henry Wilson	March 4, 1873 – November 22, 1875	President of the Senate
	Thomas W. Ferry	November 22, 1875 – March 4, 1877	President pro tempore
	William A. Wheeler	March 4, 1877 – March 4, 1881	President of the Senate
	Chester A. Arthur	March 4 – September 19, 1881	President of the Senate
Vacant September 19 – October 10, 1881 (Note: The Senate was without both a president and a president pro tempore following Chester A. Arthur's accession to the presidency upon the death of James Garfield, until Thomas F. Bayard was elected president pro tempore.)
	Thomas F. Bayard	October 10–13, 1881	President pro tempore
	David Davis III	October 13, 1881 – March 3, 1883	President pro tempore
	George F. Edmunds	March 3, 1883 – March 3, 1885	President pro tempore
	Thomas A. Hendricks	March 4, 1885 – November 25, 1885	President of the Senate
Vacant November 25 – December 7, 1885 (Note: The Senate was without both a president and a president pro tempore following the death of Vice President Thomas A. Hendricks, until John Sherman was elected president pro tempore.)
	John Sherman	December 7, 1885 – February 26, 1887	President pro tempore
	John James Ingalls	February 26, 1887 – March 3, 1889	President pro tempore
	Levi P. Morton	March 4, 1889 – March 4, 1893	President of the Senate
	Adlai E. Stevenson I	March 4, 1893 – March 4, 1897	President of the Senate
	Garret Hobart	March 4, 1897 – November 21, 1899	President of the Senate
	William P. Frye	November 21, 1899 – March 4, 1901	President pro tempore
	Theodore Roosevelt	March 4 – September 14, 1901	President of the Senate
	William P. Frye	September 14, 1901 – March 4, 1905	President pro tempore
	Charles W. Fairbanks	March 4, 1905 – March 4, 1909	President of the Senate
	James S. Sherman	March 4, 1909 – October 30, 1912	President of the Senate
	Augustus Octavius Bacon	October 30 – December 15, 1912	President pro tempore (rotating)
	Jacob Harold Gallinger	December 16, 1912 – January 4, 1913	President pro tempore (rotating)
	Augustus Octavius Bacon	January 5–18, 1913	President pro tempore (rotating)
	Jacob Harold Gallinger	January 19 – February 1, 1913	President pro tempore (rotating)
	Augustus Octavius Bacon	February 2–15, 1913	President pro tempore (rotating)
	Jacob Harold Gallinger	February 16 – March 4, 1913	President pro tempore (rotating)
	Thomas R. Marshall	March 4, 1913 – March 4, 1921	President of the Senate
	Calvin Coolidge	March 4, 1921 – August 2, 1923	President of the Senate
	Albert B. Cummins	August 2, 1923 – March 4, 1925	President pro tempore
	Charles G. Dawes	March 4, 1925 – March 4, 1929	President of the Senate
	Charles Curtis	March 4, 1929 – March 4, 1933	President of the Senate
	John Nance Garner	March 4, 1933 – January 20, 1941	President of the Senate
	Henry A. Wallace	January 20, 1941 – January 20, 1945	President of the Senate
	Harry S. Truman	January 20 – April 12, 1945	President of the Senate
	Kenneth McKellar	April 12, 1945 – January 4, 1947	President pro tempore
	Arthur H. Vandenberg	January 4, 1947 – January 3, 1949	President pro tempore
	Kenneth McKellar	January 3–20, 1949	President pro tempore
	Alben W. Barkley	January 20, 1949 – January 20, 1953	President of the Senate
	Richard Nixon	January 20, 1953 – January 20, 1961	President of the Senate
	Lyndon B. Johnson	January 20, 1961 – November 22, 1963	President of the Senate
	Carl Hayden	November 22, 1963 – January 20, 1965	President pro tempore
	Hubert Humphrey	January 20, 1965 – January 20, 1969	President of the Senate
	Spiro Agnew	January 20, 1969 – October 10, 1973	President of the Senate
	James Eastland	October 10 – December 6, 1973	President pro tempore
	Gerald Ford	December 6, 1973 – August 9, 1974	President of the Senate
	James Eastland	August 9 – December 19, 1974	President pro tempore
	Nelson Rockefeller	December 19, 1974 – January 20, 1977	President of the Senate
	Walter Mondale	January 20, 1977 – January 20, 1981	President of the Senate
	George H. W. Bush	January 20, 1981 – July 13, 1985	President of the Senate
	Strom Thurmond	July 13, 1985 (Note: Thurmond was the presiding officer of the Senate from 11:28 a.m. until 7:22 p.m. while Vice President George H. W. Bush served as acting president pursuant to President Ronald Reagan's invocation of Section Three of the Twenty-fifth Amendment to the United States Constitution to declare his temporary incapacity while undergoing surgery.)	President pro tempore
	George H. W. Bush	July 13, 1985 – January 20, 1989	President of the Senate
	Dan Quayle	January 20, 1989 – January 20, 1993	President of the Senate
	Al Gore	January 20, 1993 – January 20, 2001	President of the Senate
	William Rehnquist	January 7 – February 12, 1999	Chief Justice (Impeachment trial of Bill Clinton)
	Dick Cheney	January 20, 2001 – June 29, 2002	President of the Senate
	Robert Byrd	June 29, 2002 (Note: Byrd was the presiding officer of the Senate from 7:09 a.m. until 9:24 a.m. while Vice President Dick Cheney served as acting president pursuant to President George W. Bush's invocation of Section Three of the Twenty-fifth Amendment to the United States Constitution to declare his temporary incapacity while undergoing a colonoscopy that required sedation.)	President pro tempore
	Dick Cheney	June 29, 2002 – July 21, 2007	President of the Senate
	Robert Byrd	July 21, 2007 (Note: Byrd was the presiding officer of the Senate from 7:16 a.m. until 9:21 a.m. while Vice President Dick Cheney served as acting president pursuant to President George W. Bush's invocation of Section Three of the Twenty-fifth Amendment to the United States Constitution to declare his temporary incapacity while undergoing a colonoscopy that required sedation.)	President pro tempore
	Dick Cheney	July 21, 2007 – January 20, 2009	President of the Senate
	Joe Biden	January 20, 2009 – January 20, 2017	President of the Senate
	Mike Pence	January 20, 2017 – January 20, 2021	President of the Senate
	John Roberts	January 16 – February 5, 2020	Chief Justice (First impeachment trial of Donald Trump)
	Kamala Harris	January 20, 2021 – November 19, 2021	President of the Senate
	Patrick Leahy	January 26 – February 13, 2021	President pro tempore (Second impeachment trial of Donald Trump)
	Patrick Leahy	November 19, 2021 (Note: Leahy was the presiding officer of the Senate from 10:10 a.m. until 11:35 a.m. while Vice President Kamala Harris served as acting president pursuant to President Joe Biden's invocation of Section Three of the Twenty-fifth Amendment to the United States Constitution to declare his temporary incapacity while undergoing a colonoscopy that required sedation.)	President pro tempore
	Kamala Harris	November 19, 2021 – January 20, 2025	President of the Senate
	JD Vance	January 20, 2025 – present	President of the Senate

== See also ==
- List of vice presidents of the United States
- List of presidents pro tempore of the United States Senate
- Speaker of the United States House of Representatives, the presiding officer of the United States House of Representatives
