= William P. Frye =

American politician from Maine (1830–1911)

William Pierce Frye
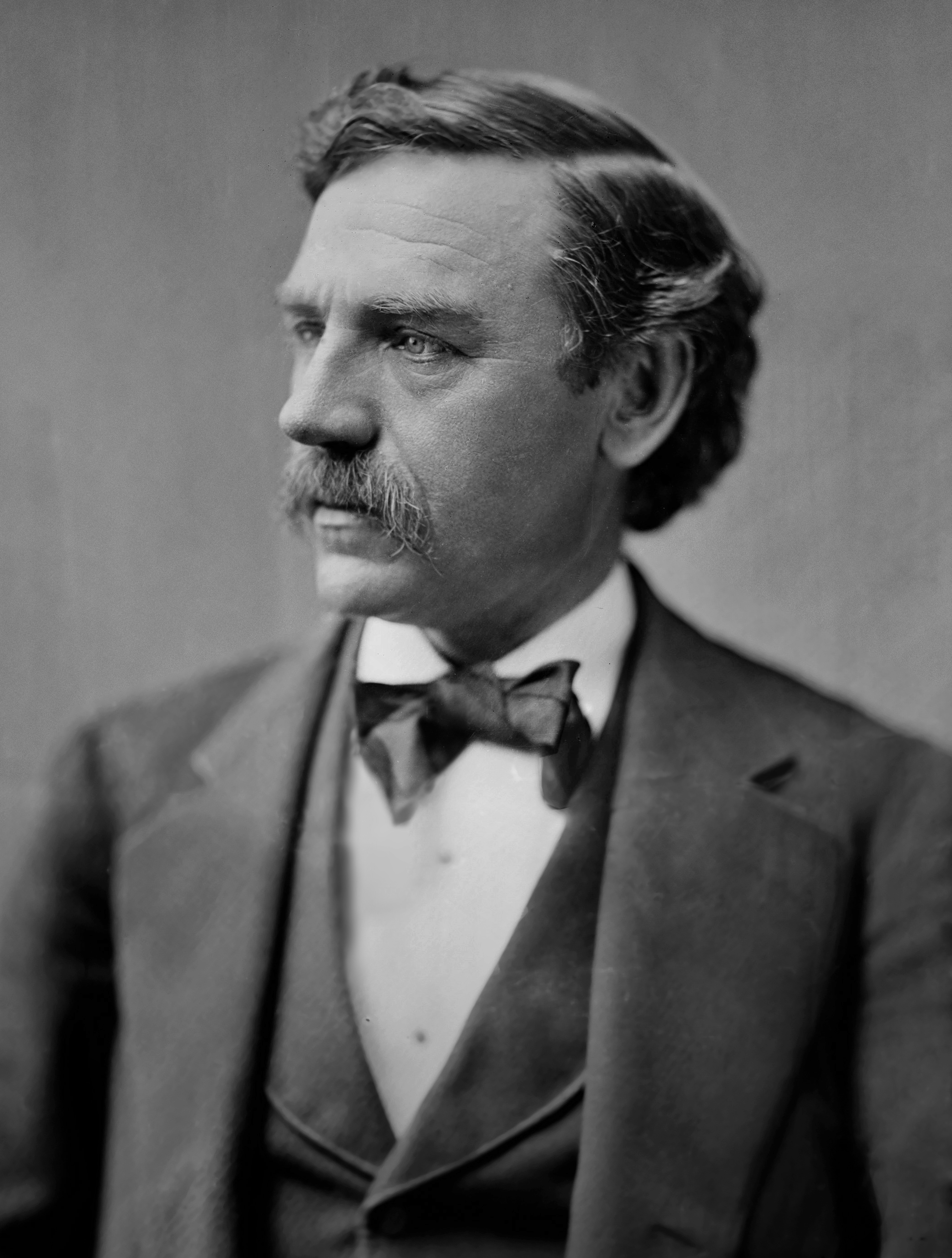
- Frye c. 1880

President pro tempore of the United States Senate
- In office February 7, 1896 – April 27, 1911
- Preceded by: Isham G. Harris
- Succeeded by: Rotating pro terms

United States Senator from Maine
- In office March 18, 1881 – August 8, 1911
- Preceded by: James G. Blaine
- Succeeded by: Obadiah Gardner

Chairman of the House Republican Conference
- In office March 4, 1879 – March 3, 1881
- Speaker: Samuel J. Randall
- Preceded by: Eugene Hale
- Succeeded by: George M. Robeson

Member of the U.S. House of Representatives from Maine's 2nd district
- In office March 4, 1871 – March 17, 1881
- Preceded by: Samuel P. Morrill
- Succeeded by: Nelson Dingley, Jr.

18th Attorney General of Maine
- In office 1867–1871
- Governor: Joshua Chamberlain
- Preceded by: John A. Peters
- Succeeded by: Thomas Brackett Reed

Member of the Maine House of Representatives
- In office 1867
- In office 1861–1862

Personal details
- Born: September 2, 1830 Lewiston, Maine, U.S.
- Died: August 8, 1911 (aged 80) Lewiston, Maine, U.S.
- Resting place: Riverside Cemetery
- Party: Republican
- Relations: Wallace H. White Jr. (grandson)
- Education: Bowdoin College
- Occupation: Lawyer; politician
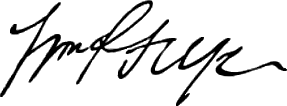
- Signature

William Pierce Frye (September 2, 1830 – August 8, 1911) was an American politician from Maine. A member of the Republican Party, Frye spent most of his political career as a legislator, serving in the Maine House of Representatives and then U.S. House of Representatives, before being elected to the U.S. Senate, where he served for 30 years before dying in office. Frye was a member of the Frye political family, and was the grandfather of Wallace H. White Jr., and the son of John March Frye. He was also a prominent member of the Peucinian Society tradition. To date, Frye is the longest serving Senator in Maine's history.

Frye was a leader of the "Old Guard" faction of conservative Republicans, exerting his weight on such important committees as Rules, Foreign Relations, Appropriations, and Commerce. He was best known for supporting the shipping industry, but repeatedly failed to obtain government subsidies. He also supported high tariffs, expansion that sought additional territory and the canal connecting the Atlantic and Pacific. He favored the annexation of Hawaii and the acquisition of the Philippine Islands in 1898. President William McKinley appointed him to the peace commission that negotiated the end of the Spanish-American war.

== Biography ==
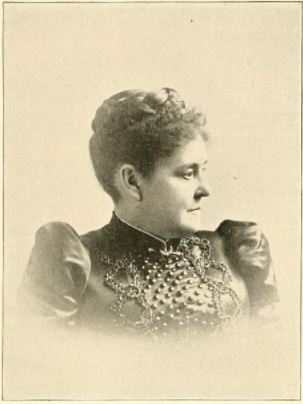
Mrs. William P. Frye

Frye was born in Lewiston, Maine, in Androscoggin County. He attended public schools there and graduated from Bowdoin College in Brunswick in 1850. Frye studied law and was later admitted to the bar. He began practicing in Rockland, Maine in 1853 but later returned to Lewiston, and practiced law there. While living in Rockland, he married Caroline Spear (1832 - 1900) in February 1853. Frye played a role in founding Bates College in Lewiston and served as a longtime trustee of the college. Frye received an honorary LL.D. from Bates in 1881.

Frye was a presidential elector in 1864.

Frye served in the Maine House of Representatives from 1861 to 1862 and again in 1867. He was later elected as the mayor of Lewiston, holding that position from 1866 to 1867, when he became the state attorney general. Frye left the attorney general post in 1869. He was elected as a Republican in 1870 to the U.S. House of Representatives. Frye served in the 42nd Congress and the five succeeding Congresses from March 4, 1871, to March 17, 1881, when he resigned after being elected Senator to fill the vacancy caused by the resignation of James G. Blaine, who was appointed by President Garfield to be Secretary of State. He served over 30 years in the Senate (March 18, 1881 – August 8, 1911), and was reelected in 1883, 1889, 1895, 1901, and 1907.

During his tenure in the Senate, Frye served as its President pro tempore from the 54th–62nd Congress. The Vice Presidency was vacant twice during that time: November 21, 1899 – March 4, 1901, following the death of Garret Hobart, and September 14, 1901 – March 4, 1905, after Theodore Roosevelt succeeded to the presidency. Frye resigned as president pro tempore due to ill health a couple of months before his death. Electing his successor proved difficult for the Senate, as the Republicans, then in the majority, were split between progressive and conservative factions, each promoting its own candidate. It took several months for a consensus way forward to emerge. At the time of his resignation he had served longer in that position then anyone else, 15 years, 2 months, 21 days.

Frye was also the chairman of the Rules Committee (47th–49th Congress). Frye also was a member of the Commerce Committee (50th–62nd Congress) and a member of the commission which met in Paris in September 1898 to adjust the Treaty of Paris between the United States and Spain, ending the Spanish–American War.

Senator Frye was a charter member of the District of Columbia Society of the Sons of the American Revolution when it was founded in 1890.

Frye died in Lewiston in 1911. He is interred in the Riverside Cemetery. The Sen. William P. Frye House near Bates College in Lewiston is on the National Historic Register.

== See also ==
- List of members of the United States Congress who died in office (1900–1949)
- William P. Frye (1901) a ship named after him
- List of mayors of Lewiston, Maine

== Notes ==
Legal offices
Preceded by John A. Peters	Maine Attorney General; 1867–1869	Succeeded by Thomas Brackett Reed
U.S. House of Representatives
Preceded by Samuel P. Morrill	Member of the U.S. House of Representatives from Maine's 2nd congressional district March 4, 1871 – March 17, 1881	Succeeded by Nelson Dingley, Jr.
U.S. Senate
Preceded by James G. Blaine	U.S. senator (Class 2) from Maine; March 18, 1881 – August 8, 1911; Served alongside: Eugene Hale and Charles F. Johnson	Succeeded by Obadiah Gardner
Political offices
Preceded by Isham G. Harris	President pro tempore of the United States Senate; February 7, 1896 – April 27, 1911	Succeeded by Rotating pro tems
Honorary titles
Preceded by Eugene Hale	Dean of the United States Senate; March 4, 1911 – August 8, 1911	Succeeded by Shelby Moore Cullom
