= Kenneth McKellar (politician) =

American politician (1869–1957)

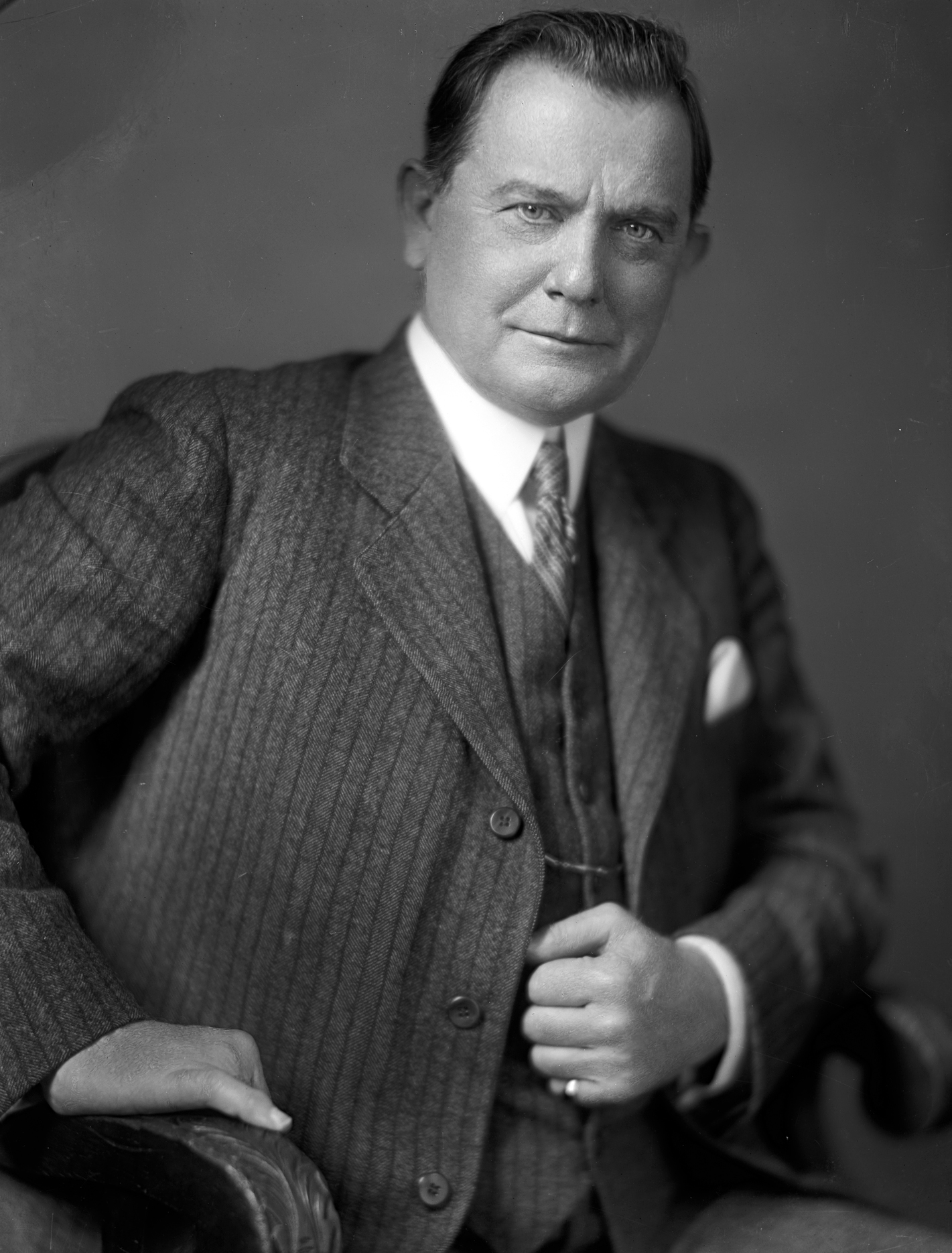

President pro tempore of the United States Senate
- In office January 3, 1949 – January 3, 1953
- Preceded by: Arthur Vandenberg
- Succeeded by: Styles Bridges
- In office January 6, 1945 – January 3, 1947
- Preceded by: Carter Glass
- Succeeded by: Arthur Vandenberg

United States Senator from Tennessee
- In office March 4, 1917 – January 3, 1953
- Preceded by: Luke Lea
- Succeeded by: Albert Gore Sr.
Committee chairmanships
Chair of the Senate Appropriations Committee
In office January 3, 1949 – January 3, 1953
Preceded by	Styles Bridges
Succeeded by	Styles Bridges
In office May 28, 1946 – January 3, 1947
Preceded by	Carter Glass
Succeeded by	Styles Bridges

Member of the U.S. House of Representatives from Tennessee's 10th district
- In office December 4, 1911 – March 3, 1917
- Preceded by: George W. Gordon
- Succeeded by: Hubert Fisher

Personal details
- Born: Kenneth Douglas McKellar; January 29, 1869 Dallas County, Alabama, U.S.
- Died: October 25, 1957 (aged 88) Memphis, Tennessee, U.S.
- Party: Democratic
- Education: University of Alabama
- Profession: Attorney

Kenneth Douglas McKellar (January 29, 1869 – October 25, 1957) was an American politician from Tennessee who served as a United States representative from 1911 until 1917 and as a United States senator from 1917 until 1953. A Democrat, he served longer in both houses of Congress than anyone else in Tennessee history.

Only a few other congressmen in American history have served longer in both houses.

== Early life and career ==
McKellar was a native of Dallas County, Alabama. He graduated from the University of Alabama in 1891 and its law school in 1892.

He moved to Memphis, Tennessee and was admitted to the state bar the same year. McKellar joined the Democratic Party, which dominated the politics of West Tennessee, where plantations were historically and economically important. He was first elected to the House in a special election in November 1911 to succeed George W. Gordon in Tennessee's 10th congressional district, which included Memphis. He won the seat in his own right in 1912 and was reelected in 1914, serving until his election to the United States Senate.

He was a presidential elector in 1904.

== United States Senate ==
McKellar ran for the Senate in 1916, defeating incumbent Senator Luke Lea in the Democratic primary and winning the general election against former Republican Governor Ben W. Hooper. He was reelected to the Senate in 1922 (defeating former Senator Newell Sanders), 1928 (defeating former U.S. Assistant Attorney General James Alexander Fowler), 1934 (again defeating Ben Hooper), 1940 (against Howard Baker, Sr., father of future Senator Howard Baker), and 1946 when he defeated William B. Ladd.

McKellar was considered a moderate progressive in his early days in the Senate, and he supported many of President Woodrow Wilson's reform initiatives as well as ratification of the Treaty of Versailles. During President Franklin D. Roosevelt's administration, McKellar staunchly supported the New Deal, especially the creation of the Tennessee Valley Authority (TVA), to provide flood control and generate hydropower for rural electrification in the Tennessee Valley. McKellar was close ally of Memphis Democratic political boss E. H. Crump.

Kenneth McKellar was a crusader for free trade; he supported the repeal of the Smoot-Hawley Tariff after 1930. Despite his early support for the policies of Franklin D. Roosevelt (FDR), McKellar became more conservative in his political stances. He opposed several of the administration's appointments. He had a prolonged feud with FDR's appointee to head the TVA, David E. Lilienthal.

As ranking member of the Appropriations Committee McKellar, who was an avid supporter of property rights, successfully forced the TVA to properly reimburse landowners whose property was taken over by the TVA for such purposes as dam building and creation of lakes or reservoirs.

=== The Manhattan Project ===
McKellar was reported to have threatened to withhold Federal appropriations for the purchase of uranium early in World War II, and the TVA was commonly offering to give landholders "pennies on the dollar" for their properties. It has been reported that through the Appropriations Committee, McKellar knew about the appropriations needed for the Manhattan Project to build an atomic bomb, and was often called upon to "keep the secret" of the Manhattan Project by mingling funds for the bomb project with other projects, or through carefully planned (secret) War Projects Funding. As the Tennessee Valley Authority was centered in Tennessee, his home state, McKellar reacted to what he thought was harsh TVA treatment of his constituents as a personal affront by Lilienthal.

However, there is now evidence from the published memoir of Senator Elmer Thomas of Oklahoma, chairman of the Senate Appropriations Subcommittee on Military Spending the skewers McKellar's story. In Thomas' recollection, McKellar had not even been invited to the critical secret briefing in the Capitol to discuss the Project funding. In fact, McKellar had confided to fellow members of the panel that the government was building something in Tennessee “which he feared might turn out to be a ‘white elephant.’” Thomas wrote, “[McKellar]stated that the government had secured a very large tract” and “had constructed many buildings and a vast number of residences; that the land was being enclosed with an expensive form of fencing, and that no one, not even the constructors constructing the improvements, had any idea as to what use was to be made of the project.”, chairman of the Senate Appropriations Subcommittee on Military Spending reportedly skewered McKellar's story. In his recollection, McKellar had not even been invited to the critical secret briefing in the Capitol to discuss the Project funding. In fact, McKellar had confided to fellow members of the panel that the government was building something in Tennessee “which he feared might turn out to be a ‘white elephant.’” Thomas wrote, “[McKellar]stated that the government had secured a very large tract” and “had constructed many buildings and a vast number of residences; that the land was being enclosed with an expensive form of fencing, and that no one, not even the constructors constructing the improvements, had any idea as to what use was to be made of the project.”

McKellar's threat to withhold funding for purchases of uranium had a much deeper meaning, though. Lilienthal was also closely associated with the Manhattan Project's work to electromagnetically enrich uranium, coincidentally at the facility later known as Y-12. Ernest Lawrence's "electromagnetic" enrichment of uranium at Oak Ridge would eventually use the electricity created by the TVA to enrich the uranium used in the atomic bomb dropped on Hiroshima. By threatening to withhold funding for the purchase of uranium, McKellar was demonstrating to Lilienthal that the politician, as ranking member and Acting Chairman of the Appropriations Committee, held the power. He forced Lilienthal to have the TVA pay fair market value for land it appropriated.

=== Post War ===
McKellar twice served as President pro tempore of the United States Senate. Beginning in 1945, he was the first to hold the position under the seniority system that has prevailed since of reserving it for the majority party. When Harry Truman became president in April 1945, upon FDR's death, the vice presidency became vacant. (The mechanism for filling intra-term vacancies had not yet been created by the 25th Amendment.) McKellar became the permanent Presiding Officer of the United States Senate.

Also, as the President pro tempore of the Senate had, prior to 1886, been second in the presidential line of succession, behind only the vice president, Truman viewed McKellar as the logical wartime replacement for himself, and asked McKellar to attend all Cabinet meetings. In 1947 Truman successfully lobbied Congress to pass a new Presidential Succession Act, restoring both the Speaker of the House and the President pro tempore of the Senate to the succession ahead of Cabinet secretaries. By the time the law came into effect, McKellar was no longer in the position of President pro tempore, as the Republicans had gained the majority in the 80th Congress. Truman vetoed the Taft-Hartley Act in 1947 to restrict labor unions, which McKellar had favored. Truman selected Alben Barkley of Kentucky as his running mate in the 1948 presidential election. When Democrats regained control of the Senate following the 1948 elections, McKellar again became President pro tempore. He was second in line for the presidency (behind the Speaker of the House) from January 3, 1949 until January 20, 1949, when Alben Barkley took office as Vice President of the United States.

McKellar also served as chairman of the Civil Service Committee, Post Office and Road Committee, and, most notably, the powerful Appropriations Committee from 1945–1947, and again from 1949–1953.

=== Longevity ===
McKellar is the only Tennessee senator to have completed more than three full terms. Except for McKellar, Tennessee has generally not joined in the Southern tradition of reelecting senators for protracted periods of service.

Before the era of popular election of U.S. Senators, Senator William B. Bate was elected to a fourth term by the Tennessee General Assembly, but he died five days into this term, while Senator Isham G. Harris also died early in his fourth term. Senator Joseph Anderson was elected by the General Assembly to three full terms plus the balance of the term of William Blount, who had been expelled from the Senate.

== 1952 election ==
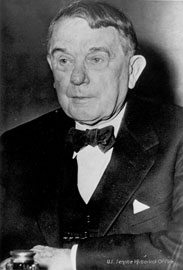
Senator Kenneth McKellar as president pro tempore

In 1952 McKellar stood for a seventh term (the first Senator to do so), despite being 83. He was opposed for renomination by Middle Tennessee Congressman Albert Gore. McKellar's reelection slogan was "Thinking Feller? Vote McKellar", which Gore countered with "Think Some More – Vote for Gore." Gore defeated McKellar for the Democratic nomination in August in what was widely regarded as something of an upset. At this point in Tennessee history, the Democratic nomination for statewide office was still "tantamount to election." Most African Americans had been disenfranchised by discriminatory laws and practices, resulting in the Republican Party being active chiefly in East Tennessee. This had been the case since the Civil War. Gore served three full terms in the Senate.

McKellar's defeat was part of a statewide trend of change in 1952. That year incumbent governor of Tennessee Gordon Browning was defeated by Frank G. Clement. Browning, who had served a total of three terms as governor, the last two successive, had also at one point been a close ally of Crump's but had since broken ranks with him. As Clement and Gore were both considerably younger and regarded as more progressive than their predecessors, some historians cite the 1952 elections as an indication that Tennessee entered into the "New South" era of Southern politics earlier than most of the other Southern states.

== Legacy ==
McKellar wrote a book about his Tennessee predecessors in the Senate called Tennessee Senators as Seen by One of Their Successors (1942). In recent years it has been updated by one of his successors, former Senate Majority Leader Dr. Bill Frist.

Lake McKellar, bordering the Memphis President's Island industrial area along the Mississippi River and McKellar-Sipes Regional Airport (originally "McKellar Field") in Jackson, Tennessee ("MKL") are both named in his honor.

McKellar died on October 25, 1957. He is interred at Elmwood Cemetery in Memphis, Tennessee.

== Representation in other media ==
Some have speculated that Senator McKellar was the inspiration for the character South Carolina Senator Seabright Cooley in Allen Drury's novel Advise and Consent.

McKellar was portrayed by actor/country singer Ed Bruce in the film Public Enemies (2009) and Michael O'Neill in the film J. Edgar (2011).

Party political offices
First	Democratic nominee for U.S. Senator from Tennessee (Class 1); 1916, 1922, 1928, 1934, 1940, 1946	Succeeded by Albert Gore Sr.
U.S. House of Representatives
Preceded by George W. Gordon	Member of the U.S. House of Representatives from Tennessee's 10th congressional district December 4, 1911 – March 3, 1917	Succeeded by Hubert Fisher
U.S. Senate
Preceded by Luke Lea	U.S. senator (Class 1) from Tennessee; March 4, 1917 – January 3, 1953; Served alongside: John K. Shields, Lawrence D. Tyson, William E. Brock I, Cordell Hull, Nathan L. Bachman, George L. Berry, Tom Stewart, Estes Kefauver	Succeeded by Albert Gore, Sr.
Political offices
Preceded by Carter Glass; Virginia	President pro tempore of the United States Senate; January 6, 1945 – January 2, 1947	Succeeded by Arthur Vandenberg; Michigan
Preceded by Carter Glass; Virginia	Chairman of the Senate Appropriations Committee; 1946 – 1947	Succeeded by Styles Bridges; New Hampshire
Preceded by Arthur Vandenberg; Michigan	President pro tempore of the United States Senate; January 3, 1949 – January 2, 1953	Succeeded by Styles Bridges; New Hampshire
Preceded by Styles Bridges; New Hampshire	Chairman of the Senate Appropriations Committee; 1949 – 1953	Succeeded by Styles Bridges; New Hampshire
Honorary titles
Preceded by Ellison D. Smith; South Carolina	Dean of the United States Senate; November 17, 1944 – January 2, 1953	Succeeded by Walter F. George; Georgia
