= Dean of the United States Senate =

US Senator with longest continuous service

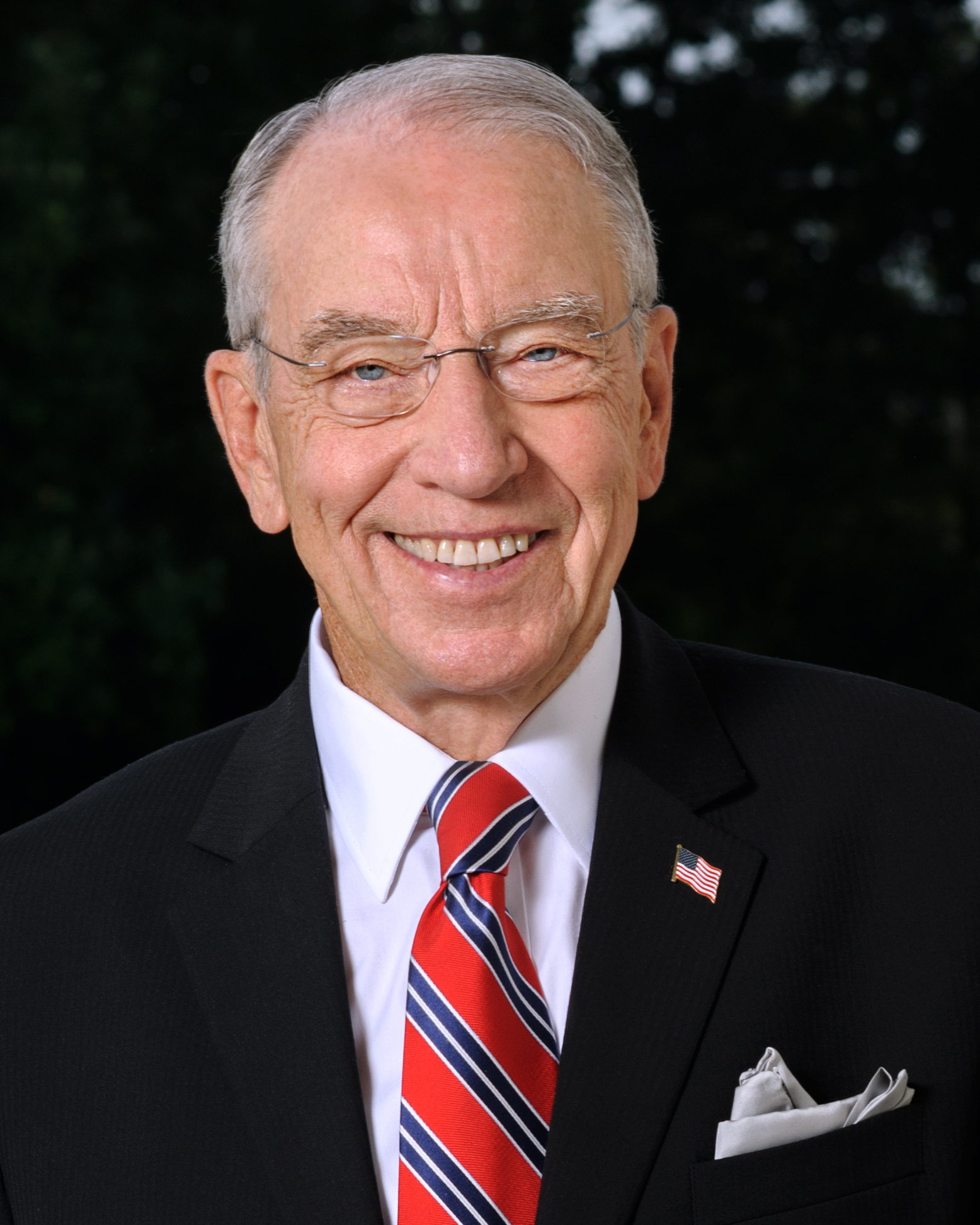
- Incumbent; Chuck Grassley since January 3, 2023
- Member of: United States Senate
- Formation: March 4, 1789
- First holder: James Gunn

The Dean of the United States Senate is an informal term for the senator with the longest continuous service, regardless of party affiliation. This is not an official position within the Senate, although customarily (since 1945) the longest-serving member of the majority party serves as president pro tempore.

The dean as of 2026 is Republican senator Chuck Grassley of Iowa. He has been in the Senate since 1981 and became dean in 2023 with the retirement of Patrick Leahy.

== List of deans ==
Name	Party	State	Years	First served
James Gunn	Anti-Admin; Democratic-Republican	GA	1789–1797	1789
John Langdon	Pro-Admin; Democratic-Republican	NH	1789–1797	1789
and others			1789–1797	1789
James Gunn	Democratic-Republican	GA	1797–1801	1789
John Langdon	Democratic-Republican	NH	1797–1801	1789
Theodore Foster	Democratic-Republican	RI	1801–1803	1790
John Brown	Democratic-Republican	KY	1803–1805	1791
James Hillhouse	Federalist	CT	1805–1810	1796
Joseph Anderson	Democratic-Republican	TN	1810–1815	1797
John Gaillard	Democratic-Republican	SC	1815–1826	1804
Benjamin Ruggles	Anti-Jacksonian	OH	1826–1833	1815
William R. King	Democratic	AL	1833–1844	1819
Thomas Benton	Democratic	MO	1844–1851	1821
Willie Person Mangum	Whig	NC	1851–1853	1831, 1840
James Pearce	Whig	MD	1853–1862	1843
James A. Bayard Jr.	Democratic	DE	1862–1864	1851
Solomon Foot	Republican	VT	1862–1864	1851
Solomon Foot	Republican	VT	1864–1866	1851
Benjamin F. Wade	Republican	OH	1866–1869	1851
Charles Sumner	Republican	MA	1869–1874	1851
Zachariah Chandler	Republican	MI	1874–1875	1857
Henry B. Anthony	Republican	RI	1875–1884	1859
George F. Edmunds	Republican	VT	1884–1891	1866
Justin Smith Morrill	Republican	VT	1891–1898	1867
William B. Allison	Republican	IA	1898–1908	1873
Eugene Hale	Republican	ME	1908–1911	1881
William P. Frye	Republican	ME	1911	1881
Shelby Moore Cullom	Republican	IL	1911–1913	1883
Jacob Harold Gallinger	Republican	NH	1913–1918	1891
Henry Cabot Lodge	Republican	MA	1918–1924	1893
Francis E. Warren	Republican	WY	1924–1929	1895
Furnifold McLendel Simmons	Democratic	NC	1929–1931	1901
Reed Smoot	Republican	UT	1931–1933	1903
William Edgar Borah	Republican	ID	1933–1940	1907
Ellison D. Smith	Democratic	SC	1940–1944	1909
Kenneth McKellar	Democratic	TN	1944–1953	1917
Walter F. George	Democratic	GA	1953–1957	1922
Carl Hayden	Democratic	AZ	1957–1969	1927
Richard Russell Jr.	Democratic	GA	1969–1971	1933
Allen J. Ellender	Democratic	LA	1971–1972	1937
George D. Aiken	Republican	VT	1972–1975	1941
James Eastland	Democratic	MS	1975–1977	1941, 1943
John L. McClellan	Democratic	AR	1975–1977	1943
James Eastland	Democratic	MS	1977–1978	1941, 1943
Warren G. Magnuson	Democratic	WA	1978–1981	1944
John C. Stennis	Democratic	MS	1981–1989	1947
Strom Thurmond	Republican	SC	1989–2003	1954, 1956
Robert Byrd	Democratic	WV	2003–2010	1959
Daniel Inouye	Democratic	HI	2010–2012	1963
Patrick Leahy	Democratic	VT	2012–2023	1975
Chuck Grassley	Republican	IA	2023–present	1981

== Party deans ==
=== Democratic ===
Name	State	Years
Nathaniel Macon	NC	1826–1828
Mahlon Dickerson	NJ	1828–1833
William R. King	AL	1833–1844
Thomas Benton	MO	1844–1851
David Rice Atchison	MO	1851–1855
Jesse D. Bright	IN	1855–1856
James Pearce	MD	1856–1862
James A. Bayard Jr.	DE	1862–1864
Willard Saulsbury Sr.	DE	1864–1871
Garrett Davis	KY	1871–1872
George Vickers	MD	1872–1873
Thomas F. Bayard	DE	1873–1885
Eli Saulsbury	DE	1885–1889
Matt Whitaker Ransom	NC	1889–1895
Francis Cockrell	MO	1895–1905
John Tyler Morgan	AL	1905–1907
William Pinkney Whyte	MD	1907–1908
Henry M. Teller	CO	1908–1909
John W. Daniel	VA	1909–1910
Benjamin Tillman	SC	1910–1918
Thomas S. Martin	VA	1918–1919
Charles Allen Culberson	TX	1919–1923
Furnifold McLendel Simmons	NC	1923–1931
Ellison D. Smith	SC	1931–1944
Kenneth McKellar	TN	1944–1953
Walter F. George	GA	1953–1957
Carl Hayden	AZ	1957–1969
Richard Russell	GA	1969–1971
Allen J. Ellender	LA	1971–1972
James Eastland	MS	1972–1978
Warren Magnuson	WA	1978–1981
John C. Stennis	MS	1981–1989
Robert Byrd	WV	1989–2010
Daniel Inouye	HI	2010–2012
Patrick Leahy	VT	2012–2023
Dianne Feinstein	CA	2023
Patty Murray	WA	2023–present

=== Republican ===
Name	State	Years
William H. Seward	NY	1854–1861
Solomon Foot	VT	1861–1866
Benjamin Wade	OH	1866–1869
Charles Sumner	MA	1869–1872
Henry Wilson	MA	1872–1873
Zachariah Chandler	MI	1873–1875
Henry B. Anthony	RI	1875–1884
George F. Edmunds	VT	1884–1891
Justin Smith Morrill	VT	1891–1898
William B. Allison	IA	1898–1908
Eugene Hale	ME	1908–1911
William P. Frye	ME	1911
Shelby Moore Cullom	IL	1911–1913
Jacob H. Gallinger	NH	1913–1918
Henry Cabot Lodge	MA	1918–1924
Francis E. Warren	WY	1924–1929
Reed Smoot	UT	1929–1933
William E. Borah	ID	1933–1940
Hiram W. Johnson	CA	1940–1945
Arthur Capper	KS	1945–1949
Arthur Vandenberg	MI	1949–1951
Styles Bridges	NH	1951–1961
Alexander Wiley	WI	1961–1963
George Aiken	VT	1963–1975
Milton R. Young	ND	1975–1981
Strom Thurmond	SC	1981–2003
Ted Stevens	AK	2003–2009
Richard Lugar	IN	2009–2013
Orrin Hatch	UT	2013–2019
Chuck Grassley	IA	2019–present

=== Whig ===
Name	State	Years
Nehemiah R. Knight	RI	1833–1841
Samuel Prentiss	VT	1841–1842
Nathaniel P. Tallmadge	NY	1842–1844
William Cabell Rives	VA	1844–1845
Thomas Clayton	DE	1845–1847
Samuel S. Phelps	VT	1847–1851
Willie Person Mangum	NC	1851–1853
James Pearce	MD	1853–1856
Henry S. Geyer	MO	1856–1857

=== National Republican ===
Name	State	Years
Benjamin Ruggles	OH	1825–1833
Nehemiah R. Knight	RI	1833

=== Democratic-Republican ===
Name	State	Years
John Langdon	NH	1799–1801
John Brown	KY	1801–1805
Joseph Anderson	TN	1805–1815
John Gaillard	SC	1815–1826

=== Federalist ===
Name	State	Years
James Gunn	GA	1799–1801
Theodore Foster	RI	1801–1803
Uriah Tracy	CT	1803–1807
James Hillhouse	CT	1807–1810
Timothy Pickering	MA	1810–1811
James Bayard	DE	1811–1813
Chauncey Goodrich	CT	1813
Outerbridge Horsey	DE	1813–1821
Rufus King	NY	1821–1825

=== Pro-Administration ===
Name	State	Years
Pierce Butler	SC	1789–1795
Oliver Ellsworth	CT	1795–1796
James Gunn	GA	1796–1799

=== Anti-Administration ===
Name	State	Years
Richard Bassett	DE	1789–1793
John Langdon	NH	1793–1795
Pierce Butler	SC	1795–1796
John Langdon	NH	1796–1799

== See also ==
- Baby of the United States Senate
- Oldest living United States president
- Dean of the United States House of Representatives
- List of members of the United States Congress by longevity of service
