= List of 1985 films based on actual events =

This is a list of films and miniseries released in 1985 that are based on actual events. All films on this list are from American production unless indicated otherwise.

== 1985 ==
- 1918 (1985) – drama film adapted by Horton Foote from his own play, about a small Texas town in the height of the United States involvement in World War I and the influenza epidemic sweeping the world
- A Bunny's Tale (1985) – comedy drama television film based on American feminist icon and journalist Gloria Steinem's experiences working as a Playboy Bunny in 1963
- A Thousand Skies (1985) – Australian adventure drama miniseries about the life of Sir Charles Kingsford Smith
- Anzacs (1985) – Australian historical war miniseries following the lives of a group of young Australian men who enlist in the 8th Battalion (Australia) of the First Australian Imperial Force in 1914, fighting first at Gallipoli in 1915, and then on the Western Front for the remainder of the war
- Archer (1985) – Australian Western drama television film about the true story of Archer, the first horse to win the Melbourne Cup and his 17-year-old strapper, Dave Power
- The Assisi Underground (1985) – American-Italian historical war drama film based on a true-life account by Father Rufino Niccacci of events surrounding the Assisi Network, an effort to hide 300 Jews in the town of Assisi, Italy during World War II
- The Atlanta Child Murders (1985) – mystery crime drama miniseries dramatizing the "Atlanta child murders" in which 29 African American children were murdered in Atlanta from summer 1979 through spring 1981
- Badge of the Assassin (1985) – drama television film based on the true story that took place in Harlem during 1971 – a true-crime account from the former district attorney and New York Times bestselling author Robert K. Tanenbaum and Philip Rosenberg
- Battle of Moscow (Russian: Битва за Москву) (1985) – Soviet war drama film presenting a dramatized account of the 1941 Battle of Moscow and the events preceding it
- Burke & Wills (1985) – Australian adventure drama film based on the ill-fated Burke and Wills expedition across Australia
- Canada's Sweetheart: The Saga of Hal C. Banks (1985) – Canadian biographical drama film about Hal C. Banks, a controversial American labour union leader who came to Canada in 1949 to lead a sectarian fight between rival shipping unions
- Charlie Grant's War (1985) – Canadian biographical drama television film telling the story of Charlie Grant, a Canadian activist and humanitarian who was living in Austria at the time of the war, and helped to smuggle over 600 Jews out of the country for their safety
- Children of the Night (1985) – drama television film depicting the story of Dr. Lois Lee, following her work among young prostitutes in Hollywood and the organization Children of the Night that she founded as a result
- Christopher Columbus (1985) – American-Italian adventure drama miniseries telling the story of the life of Christopher Columbus
- Colonel Redl (German: Oberst Redl; Hungarian: Redl ezredes) (1985) – Hungarian-West German-Austrian biographical drama film following the rise of Alfred Redl, an officer in the Austro-Hungarian Empire
- Confessions of a Serial Killer (1985) – horror film detailing a serial killer (based on Henry Lee Lucas) who, after being arrested, confesses to the murders of over 200 women
- Dance with a Stranger (1985) – British biographical crime drama film telling the story of Ruth Ellis, the last woman to be hanged in Britain
- Deadly Intentions (1985) – crime thriller television film about a young woman's attempt at escape with her child from her abusive sadist husband, based on a true story
- Displaced Persons (1985) – Australian drama television film about refugees arriving in Australia in 1945
- The Doctor and the Devils (1985) – British historical horror film based upon the true story of Burke and Hare, who in 1828 Edinburgh, Scotland, murdered at least 16 people and sold their bodies for anatomical dissection
- The Dream (Dutch: De Dream) (1985) – Dutch historical drama film based on a true story from the turn of the 20th century, in which three brothers, all of them left-wing activists, were imprisoned for a crime they did not commit, partly assisted by false evidence given by the victims, one of whom is the embittered ex-lover of one of the brothers
- Dreamchild (1985) – British comedy drama film depicting a fictionalised account of Alice Liddell, the child who inspired Lewis Carroll's 1865 novel Alice's Adventures in Wonderland
- The Dunera Boys (1985) – Australian war drama miniseries based on the Dunera incident
- Eleni (1985) – war drama film based on the memoir of Nicholas Gage looking back to the effect of the 1940s Greek Civil War in Lia – the remote Greek village of Gage's upbringing in the northwestern Greek region of Epirus; and in particular, the murder of his mother by communist guerrillas of the Democratic Army of Greece (ΔΣΕ)
- The Emerald Forest (1985) – British adventure drama film telling the story of an American boy who is adopted into an indigenous tribe in the Amazon jungle, allegedly based on a true story
- Eoudong (Korean: 어우동) (1985) – South Korean drama film set in Korea's Joseon Dynasty, during the reign of King Seonngjong, when strict Confucianism forced women to follow the male dominant society
- The Falcon and the Snowman (1985) – spy drama film telling the true story of two young American men, Christopher Boyce and Andrew Daulton Lee, who sold US security secrets to the Soviet Union
- First Steps (1985) – biographical drama television film about Jerrold S. Petrofsky's research about using external electric stimulations to enable paralyzed people to use their frozen muscles
- God Rot Tunbridge Wells! (1985) – British musical drama television film about the life and musical career of the German composer George Frideric Handel
- Heart of a Champion: The Ray Mancini Story (1985) – biographical sport drama television film detailing the life of Ray Mancini, a World Boxing Association world lightweight champion boxer from 1982 to 1984, Hollywood actor and a member of the International Boxing Hall of Fame
- Hell Train (French: Train d'enfer) (1985) – French crime drama film about a fight on a train triggered by racial tension and the consequences in the locality as a result – based on a true story
- In the Shadow of Kilimanjaro (1985) – British-Kenyan adventure horror film based on true events of Chacma baboons on a murderous rampage, killing humans and animals alike, due to a severe drought in Kenya in 1984
- Izzy and Moe (1985) – comedy crime television film depicting a fictional account of two actual Prohibition-era policemen, Izzy Einstein and Moe Smith, and their adventures in tracking down illegal bars and gangsters
- Jenny's War (1985) – war drama miniseries set during World War II following a woman who launches a rescue of her Royal Air Force pilot son, who was shot down over Germany in 1941, based on a true story
- John and Yoko: A Love Story (1985) – biographical drama television film chronicling the lives of John Lennon and Yoko Ono, beginning just before they met in 1966 and concluding with Lennon's murder in 1980
- King David (1985) – Christian epic drama film about the life of David, the second King of the Kingdom of Israel
- Love Lives On (1985) – drama television film based on the true story of a 15-year-old drug addicted girl who must choose between continuing her pregnancy or undergoing treatment for her fast-growing cancer
- Malice in Wonderland (1985) – biographical drama television film based on real life stories of powerful Hollywood gossip columnists Hedda Hopper and Louella Parsons, once friends and later rivals
- Mamma Ebe (1985) – drama film based on the story of a woman brought to trial on charges of moral plagiarism and witchcraft
- Marie (1985) – biographical drama film about Marie Ragghianti, former head of the Tennessee Board of Pardons and Paroles, who was removed from office in 1977 after refusing to release prisoners on whose behalf bribes had been paid to aides to Governor Ray Blanton
- Mask (1985) – biographical drama film based on the life and early death of Roy L. "Rocky" Dennis, a boy who had craniodiaphyseal dysplasia, an extremely rare genetic disorder known commonly as lionitis due to the disfiguring cranial enlargements that it causes
- Mata Hari (1985) – drama film portraying Mata Hari as an innocent woman manipulated by the secret services of Germany and France into providing intelligence, at first unwittingly and unwillingly, and later driven by the nonpartisan desire to save live
- Mesmerized (1985) – drama film loosely based upon the Pimlico Mystery
- Mishima: A Life in Four Chapters (Japanese: 三島：四章からなる生涯) (1985) – American-Japanese biographical drama film based on the life and work of Japanese writer Yukio Mishima
- Mussolini and I (1985) – biographical drama television film chronicling the strained relationship between Italy's fascist dictator Benito Mussolini and his son-in-law and foreign minister, Count Galeazzo Ciano, based on Ciano's diaries
- Mussolini: The Untold Story (1985) – American-Cinema of the United Kingdom biographical drama miniseries following the rise, rule, and downfall of the Italian dictator Benito Mussolini
- My American Cousin (1985) – Canadian biographical drama film based on Sandy Wilson's own childhood
- My Wicked, Wicked Ways: The Legend of Errol Flynn (1985) – biographical drama television film about the life of Errol Flynn
- Out of Africa (1985) – epic romantic drama film recounting the events of the seventeen years when Karen Blixen made her home in Kenya, then called British East Africa
- Out of the Darkness (1985) – crime thriller television film about the pursuit of the serial killer David Berkowitz by New York City detective Ed Zigo
- Poems of Asolo (Italian: Poemi Asolani) (1985) – Italian biographical film about the Italian music composer Gian Francesco Malipiero
- The Red Countess (Hungarian: A vörös grófnő) (1985) – Hungarian biographical drama film telling the story of Katinka Andrássy who, as a member of one of the country's most prestigious aristocratic families, agreed to marry the left-wing politician Mihály Károlyi
- The Repenter (Italian: Il pentito) (1985) – Italian crime drama film loosely based on actual events involving, among others, pentito Tommaso Buscetta, judge Giovanni Falcone and banker Michele Sindona
- Right to Kill? (1985) – crime drama television film based on a true story of two teens living in Wyoming, Richard Jahnke and Deborah Jahnke, who were charged for the killing of their psychotically abusive father, Richard Jahnke, Sr.
- Robert Kennedy and His Times (1985) – drama miniseries based on the 1978 Robert F. Kennedy biography of the same name by Arthur M. Schlesinger, Jr.
- Samuel Lount (1985) – Canadian biographical drama film about Samuel Lount, an organizer of the rebellion who was ultimately convicted of treason and executed in 1838
- Sofia Kovalevskaya (Russian: Софья Ковалевская) (1985) – Soviet biographical miniseries based on a true story of mathematician and scientist Sofia Kovalevskaya
- Sri Raghavendrar (Tamil: ஸ்ரீ ராகவேந்திரர்) (1985) – Indian Tamil-language drama film depicting the life of Sri Raghavendra, from Birth until his Mahasamadhi
- Sweet Dreams (1985) – biographical drama film telling the story of country music singer Patsy Cline
- Sylvia (1985) – New Zealander biographical drama film about New Zealand educator Sylvia Ashton-Warner, inspired by two of her books
- The Time to Live and the Time to Die (Mandarin: 童年往事) (1985) – Taiwanese biographical drama film inspired by Hou Hsiao-hsien's own experience of growing up in Fengshan, Kaohsiung city
- Wallenberg: A Hero's Story (1985) – biographical drama television film about Raoul Wallenberg, a Swedish diplomat who was instrumental in saving thousands of Hungarian Jews from the Holocaust
- Wills & Burke (1985) – Australian biographical black comedy film about the Burke and Wills expedition
- Zhuge Liang (Mandarin: 諸葛亮) (1985) – Chinese biographical drama miniseries based on the life of Zhuge Liang, a chancellor (or prime minister) of the state of Shu Han in the Three Kingdoms period
- Zina (1985) – British biographical drama film telling a story of a twentieth century Antigone, Zinaida Volkova, daughter of Leon Trotsky
