= Fred Thompson =

American politician and actor (1942–2015)

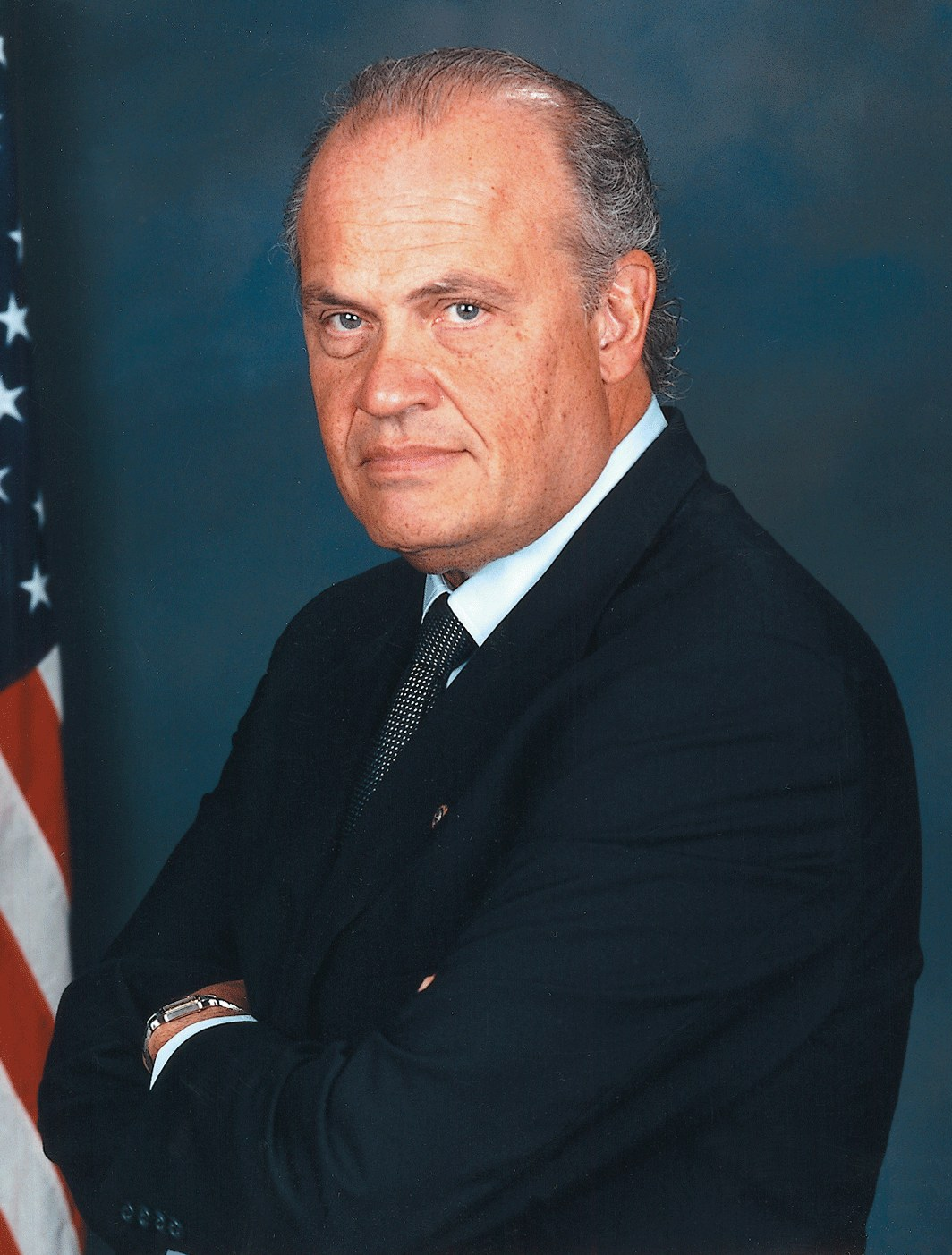
- Official portrait of Thompson

United States Senator from Tennessee
- In office December 2, 1994 – January 3, 2003
- Preceded by: Harlan Mathews
- Succeeded by: Lamar Alexander
Committee positions
Chair of the Senate Governmental Affairs Committee
In office January 20, 2001 – June 6, 2001
Preceded by	Joe Lieberman
Succeeded by	Joe Lieberman
In office January 3, 1997 – January 3, 2001
Preceded by	Ted Stevens
Succeeded by	Joe Lieberman

Personal details
- Born: Freddie Dalton Thompson; August 19, 1942 Sheffield, Alabama, U.S.
- Died: November 1, 2015 (aged 73) Nashville, Tennessee, U.S.
- Party: Republican
- Spouses: Sarah Knestrick (m. 1959; div. 1985) Jeri Kehn (m. 2002)
- Children: 5
- Education: University of Memphis (BA); Vanderbilt University (JD)
- Fred Thompson's voice Thompson speaks in support of the Deceptive Mail Prevention and Enforcement Act. Recorded August 2, 1999

Freddie Dalton Thompson (August 19, 1942 – November 1, 2015) was an American politician, attorney, lobbyist, columnist, actor, and radio personality. A member of the Republican Party, he served as a United States senator from Tennessee from 1994 to 2003. He was an unsuccessful candidate in the Republican Party presidential primaries for the 2008 United States presidential election.

He chaired the International Security Advisory Board at the U.S. Department of State, was a member of the U.S.–China Economic and Security Review Commission, a member of the Council on Foreign Relations, as well as a visiting fellow with the American Enterprise Institute, specializing in national security and intelligence.

Usually credited as Fred Dalton Thompson, he appeared in a number of movies and television shows including Matlock, The Hunt for Red October, Die Hard 2, In the Line of Fire, Days of Thunder, and Cape Fear, as well as in commercials. He frequently portrayed governmental authority figures and military men. In the final months of his U.S. Senate term in 2002, Thompson joined the cast of the NBC television series Law & Order, starring as Manhattan District Attorney Arthur Branch.

== Early life and education ==
Fred Thompson was born on August 19, 1942, at Colbert County Hospital (now Helen Keller Memorial Hospital) in Sheffield, Alabama. He was the son of Ruth Inez (née Bradley) and Fletcher Session Thompson, a used car salesman born in Lauderdale County, Alabama, on August 26, 1919, and who died in Lawrenceburg, Tennessee, on May 27, 1990. Thompson was of primarily Scottish and some English and distant Dutch, ancestry.

He was raised in Lawrenceburg, Tennessee, where he attended public schools and graduated from Lawrence County High School in 1960. During high school, he played football, and afterward worked during the day at the local post office and at night in the Murray bicycle assembly plant.

Thompson was raised attending churches of the Churches of Christ, and often credited his values to both his family upbringing and church teachings. In a 2007 interview, he stated, "I attend church when I'm in Tennessee. I'm [living] in McLean right now. I don't attend regularly when I'm up there." Later in life, he occasionally attended Vienna Presbyterian Church in Vienna, Virginia. He rarely spoke about religion during his 2008 presidential campaign, saying, "Me getting up and talking about what a wonderful person I am and that sort of thing, I'm not comfortable with that, and I don't think it does me any good."

In September 1959, at age 17, Thompson married Sarah Elizabeth Lindsey after learning she was pregnant. Their first child, Freddie Dalton "Tony" Thompson Jr., was born in April 1960. Two more children, Daniel and Elizabeth, followed soon after.

Thompson initially enrolled at Florence State College (now the University of North Alabama), becoming the first in his family to attend college. He later transferred to Memphis State University (now the University of Memphis), where he earned a double major in philosophy and political science in 1964. He was then awarded a scholarship to attend Vanderbilt University Law School, earning his Juris Doctor degree in 1967. During this time, both he and Sarah worked to support their growing family and cover his education expenses. The couple divorced in 1985.

== Career as an attorney ==
Thompson was admitted to the state bar of Tennessee in 1967. At that time, he shortened his first name from Freddie to Fred. He worked as an assistant U.S. attorney from 1969 to 1972, successfully prosecuting bank robberies and other cases. Thompson was the campaign manager for Republican U.S. Senator Howard Baker's re-election campaign in 1972, and was minority counsel to the Senate Watergate Committee in its investigation of the Watergate scandal (1973–1974).

In the 1980s, Thompson worked as an attorney, with law offices in Nashville and Washington, DC, handling personal injury claims and defending people accused of white collar crimes. He also accepted appointments as special counsel to the Senate Foreign Relations Committee (1980–1981), special counsel to the Senate Intelligence Committee (1982), and member of the Appellate Court Nominating Commission for the State of Tennessee (1985–1987).

His clients included a German mining group and Japan's Toyota Motor Corporation. Thompson served on various corporate boards. He also did legal work and served on the board of directors for engineering firm Stone & Webster.

=== Role in Watergate hearings ===
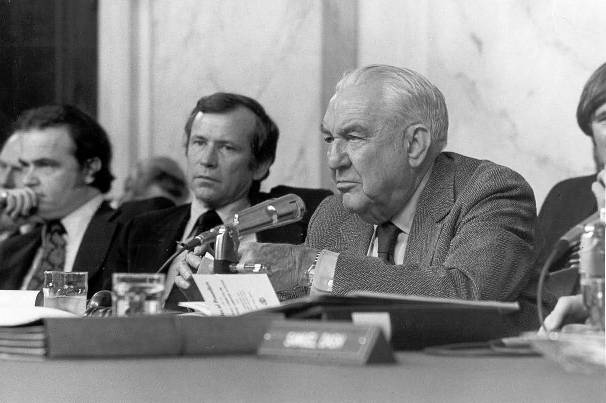
From left to right: Thompson (minority counsel), Howard Baker, and Sam Ervin of the Senate Watergate Committee in 1973

In 1973, Thompson was appointed minority counsel to assist the Republican senators on the Senate Watergate Committee, a special committee convened by the U.S. Senate to investigate the Watergate scandal. Thompson was sometimes credited for supplying Republican Senator Howard Baker's famous question, "What did the President know, and when did he know it?" This question is said to have helped frame the hearings in a way that eventually led to the downfall of President Richard Nixon. The question remains popular and is often invoked by pundits commenting on political scandals.

A Republican staff member, Donald Sanders, found out about the White House tapes and informed the committee on July 13, 1973. Thompson was informed of the existence of the tapes, and he, in turn, informed Nixon's attorney, J. Fred Buzhardt. "Even though I had no authority to act for the committee, I decided to call Fred Buzhardt at home," Thompson later wrote, "I wanted to be sure that the White House was fully aware of what was to be disclosed so that it could take appropriate action."

Three days after Sanders's discovery, at a public, televised committee hearing, Thompson asked former White House aide Alexander Butterfield the famous question, "Mr. Butterfield, were you aware of the installation of any listening devices in the Oval Office of the President?" thereby publicly revealing the existence of tape recordings of conversations within the White House. National Public Radio later called that session and the discovery of the Watergate tapes "a turning point in the investigation."

Thompson's appointment as minority counsel to the Senate Watergate committee reportedly upset Nixon, who believed Thompson was not skilled enough to interrogate unfriendly witnesses and would be outfoxed by the committee Democrats. According to historian Stanley Kutler, however, Thompson and Baker "carried water for the White House, but I have to give them credit—they were watching out for their interests, too ... They weren't going to mindlessly go down the tubes [for Nixon]."

Journalist Scott Armstrong, a Democratic investigator for the Senate Watergate Committee, is critical of Thompson for having disclosed the committee's knowledge of the tapes to Buzhardt during an ongoing investigation, and says Thompson was "a mole for the White House" and that Thompson's actions gave the White House a chance to destroy the tapes. Thompson's 1975 book At That Point in Time, in turn, accused Armstrong of having been too close to The Washington Post's Bob Woodward and of leaking committee information to him. In response to renewed interest in this matter, in 2007 during his presidential campaign, Thompson said, "I'm glad all of this has finally caused someone to read my Watergate book, even though it's taken them over 30 years."

=== Corruption case against Tennessee governor ===
In 1977, Thompson represented Marie Ragghianti, a former Tennessee Parole Board chair, who had been fired for refusing to release felons after they had bribed aides to Democratic Governor Ray Blanton to obtain clemency. With Thompson's assistance, Ragghianti filed a wrongful termination suit against Blanton's office. In July 1978, a jury awarded Ragghianti $38,000 ($139,165.09 in 2016 dollars) in back pay and ordered her reinstatement.

== Career as a lobbyist ==
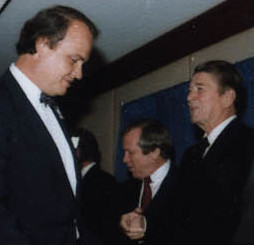
Thompson greeting President Ronald Reagan in 1983

Thompson earned about $1 million in total from his lobbying efforts. Except for the year 1981, his lobbying never amounted to more than one-third of his income. According to the Memphis Commercial Appeal:

Fred Thompson earned about half a million dollars from Washington lobbying from 1975 through 1993 ... Lobbyist disclosure records show Thompson had six lobbying clients: Westinghouse, two cable television companies, the Tennessee Savings and Loan League, the Teamsters Union's Central States Pension Fund, and a Baltimore-based business coalition that lobbied for federal grants.

Thompson lobbied Congress on behalf of the Tennessee Savings and Loan League to pass the Garn–St. Germain Depository Institutions Act of 1982, which deregulated the savings and loan industry. A large congressional majority and President Ronald Reagan supported the act, but it was said to be a factor that led to the savings and loan crisis. Thompson received $1,600 for communicating with some congressional staffers on this issue.

When Haitian President Jean-Bertrand Aristide was overthrown in 1991, Thompson made a telephone call to White House Chief of Staff John H. Sununu advocating restoration of Aristide's government, but said that was as a private citizen, not on a paid basis on Aristide's behalf.

Billing records show that Thompson was paid for about 20 hours of work in 1991 and 1992 on behalf of the National Family Planning and Reproductive Health Association, a family planning group trying to ease a George H. W. Bush administration regulation on abortion counseling in federally funded clinics.

After Thompson was elected to the Senate, two of his sons followed him into the lobbying business, but generally avoided clients where a possible conflict of interest might appear. When he left the Senate, some of his political action committee's fees went to the lobbying firm of one of his sons.

== Initial acting career ==
Marie Ragghianti's case became the subject of a book, Marie, which was written by Peter Maas and published in 1983. The film rights were purchased by director Roger Donaldson, who, after traveling to Nashville to speak with the people involved with the original case, asked Thompson if he wanted to play himself. The resulting film, Marie, was Thompson's first acting role and was released in 1985. Roger Donaldson then cast Thompson in the part of CIA director Marshall in the 1987 film No Way Out. He played the head of FBI special-agent training in the 1988 comedy Feds; in the trailer, the FBI disclaimed any connection with the film. In 1990, he was cast as Ed Trudeau, the head of Dulles Airport, in the action sequel Die Hard 2, as Rear Admiral Painter in The Hunt for Red October, and as Big John, the President of NASCAR, in the movie Days of Thunder (patterned on 'Big' Bill France).

Thompson went on to be cast in many films including as Tom Broadbent in Cape Fear (1991) and White House Chief of Staff Harry Sargent in In the Line of Fire (1993). A 1994 New York Times profile wrote, "When Hollywood directors need someone who can personify governmental power, they often turn to him." He also appeared in several television shows including Roseanne, Matlock and (eventually) a role on Law & Order.

== United States Senator ==
=== Election ===
==== 1994 ====
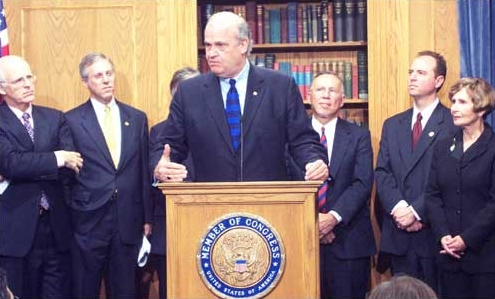
Fred Thompson with the U.S. Senate in 2002

In 1994, Thompson was elected to finish the remaining two years of Al Gore's unexpired U.S. Senate term. During the 1994 campaign, Thompson's opponent was longtime Nashville Congressman Jim Cooper. Thompson campaigned in a red pickup truck, and Cooper charged Thompson "is a lobbyist and actor who talks about lower taxes, talks about change, while he drives a rented stage prop." In a good year for Republican candidates, Thompson defeated Cooper by 320,068 votes, overcoming Cooper's early 20% lead in the polls to defeat him by an even greater margin. On the same night Thompson was elected to fill Gore's unexpired term, political newcomer Bill Frist, a Nashville heart surgeon, defeated three-term incumbent Democrat Jim Sasser, the chairman of the Senate Budget Committee, for Tennessee's other Senate seat, which was up for a full six-year term. The twin victories by Thompson and Frist gave Republicans control of both of Tennessee's Senate seats for the first time since Sasser ousted incumbent Bill Brock in 1976.

==== 1996 ====
In 1996, Thompson was re-elected to a full term by 436,617 votes, defeating Democratic attorney Houston Gordon of Covington, Tennessee, even as Bill Clinton and running mate Al Gore narrowly carried the state by less than three percentage points on their way to re-election. During this campaign, Mike Long served as Thompson's chief speechwriter.

=== Committee assignments ===
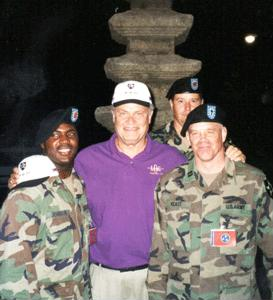
Senator Thompson meeting with U.S. soldiers in South Korea, 2001

In 1996, Thompson was a member of the Committee on Governmental Affairs when the committee investigated the alleged Chinese attempts to influence American politics. Thompson says he was "largely stymied" during these investigations by witnesses declining to testify, claiming the right not to incriminate themselves or by simply leaving the country. Thompson explained, "Our work was affected tremendously by the fact that Congress is a much more partisan institution than it used to be."

Thompson became committee chairman in 1997, but was reduced to ranking minority member when the Democrats took control of the Senate in 2001. Thompson served on the Finance Committee (dealing with health care, trade, Social Security, and taxation), the Intelligence Committee, and the National Security Working Group.

Thompson's work included investigation of the "Umm Hajul controversy" which involved the death of Tennessean Lance Fielder during the Gulf War. During his term, he supported campaign finance reform, opposed proliferation of weapons of mass destruction, and promoted government efficiency and accountability. During the 1996 presidential debates, he also served as a Clinton stand-in to help prepare Bob Dole.

On February 12, 1999, the Senate voted on the Clinton impeachment. The perjury charge was defeated with 45 votes for conviction, and 55, including Thompson, against. The obstruction of justice charge was defeated with 50, including Thompson, for conviction, and 50 against. Conviction on impeachment charges requires the affirmative votes of 67 senators.

=== Campaign co-chairman for John McCain's 2000 presidential campaign ===
In the 2000 Republican Party presidential primaries, Thompson backed former Tennessee Governor Lamar Alexander, who eventually succeeded Thompson in the Senate two years later. When Alexander dropped out, Thompson endorsed Senator John McCain's bid and became his national co-chairman. After George W. Bush won the primaries, both McCain and Thompson were considered as potential running mates.

=== Ratings ===
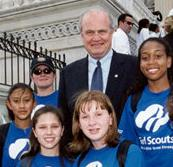
Senator Thompson meeting with Girl Scouts

Thompson's rating from the American Conservative Union was 86.1 (1995 to 2002), compared to 89.3 for Bill Frist, and 82.3 for John McCain. Senator Susan Collins (R-Maine) characterized her colleague this way: "I believe that Fred is a fearless senator. By that I mean he was never afraid to cast a vote or take a stand, regardless of the political consequences." Thompson was "on the short end of a couple of 99–1 votes", voting against those who wanted to federalize matters that he believed were properly left to state and local officials.

With Thompson's decision to campaign for the 2008 Republican presidential nomination, his Senate record received some criticism from people who say he was "lazy" compared to other senators. Critics say that few of his proposals became law, and point to a 1998 quote: "I don't like spending 14- and 16-hour days voting on 'sense of the Senate' resolutions on irrelevant matters. There are some important things we really need to get on with—and on a daily basis, it's very frustrating." Defenders say he spent more time in preparation than other senators. Paul Noe, a former staffer, told The New York Times, "On the lazy charge, I have to chuckle because I was there sometimes until 1 in the morning working with the man."

=== Personal life during Senate tenure ===
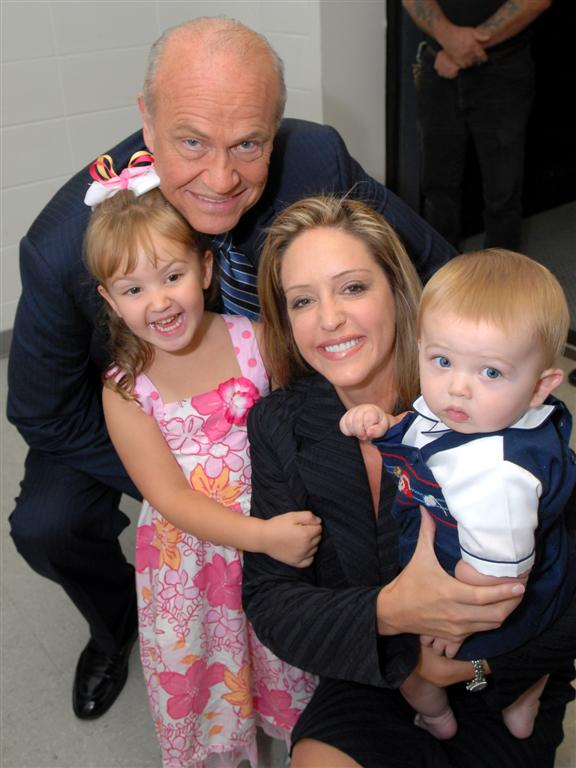
Fred and Jeri Thompson with their children in September 2007

In the years after his divorce, Thompson was romantically linked to country singer Lorrie Morgan, Republican fundraiser Georgette Mosbacher, future Counselor to the President Kellyanne Conway, and columnist Margaret Carlson.

In July 1996, Thompson began dating Jeri Kehn (born 1966) and the two married almost six years later on June 29, 2002. When he was asked in an Associated Press survey of the candidates in December 2007, to name his favorite possession he replied, tongue-in-cheek, "trophy wife". The couple had two children together, a daughter Hayden born in 2003, and a son Samuel born in 2006.

On January 30, 2002, Thompson's daughter Elizabeth "Betsy" Thompson Panici died from a brain injury resulting from cardiac arrest after what was determined to be an accidental overdose of prescription drugs.

== Initial post-Senate life and career ==
Thompson was not a candidate for reelection in 2002. He had previously stated that he was unwilling to make serving in the Senate a long-term career. While he announced in the wake of the September 11, 2001 attacks his intention to seek reelection (declaring, "now is not the time for me to leave"), upon further reflection, he decided against running for reelection. The decision seems to have been prompted in large part by the death of his daughter.

The only lobbying work Thompson did after leaving the Senate in 2003 was for the London-based reinsurance company Equitas Ltd. He was paid $760,000 between 2004 and 2006 to help prevent passage of legislation that Equitas said unfairly singled them out for unfavorable treatment regarding asbestos claims. Thompson's spokesman Mark Corrallo said that Thompson was proud to have been a lobbyist and believed in Equitas' cause.

=== Return to acting ===
As Thompson prepared to depart the Senate, he resumed his acting career. In 2002, during the final months of his Senate term, Thompson joined the cast of the NBC television series Law & Order, playing conservative District Attorney Arthur Branch, a role that he would ultimately portray for the next five years. Known in production circles and on set as, "The Liverwurst" referring to his green room requests for the Germanic dish, Thompson began filming during the August 2002 Senate recess. He made occasional appearances in the same role on other TV shows, such as Law & Order: Special Victims Unit, Law & Order: Criminal Intent, and the pilot episode of Conviction.

During these years, Thompson also had roles in films including Racing Stripes (2005) and Looking for Comedy in the Muslim World (2005). He portrayed a fictional president of the United States in Last Best Chance (2005), as well as two historical presidents in TV movies: Ulysses S. Grant in Bury My Heart at Wounded Knee (2007) and the voice of Andrew Jackson in Rachel and Andrew Jackson: A Love Story (2001).

Thompson, in 2007, again paused his acting career in order to pursue political options, this time stepping back from acting in order to accommodate a potential campaign for the presidency. On May 30, 2007, he asked to be released from the Law & Order role, potentially in preparation for a presidential bid. Due to concerns about the equal-time rule, reruns featuring the Branch character were not shown on NBC while Thompson was a potential or actual presidential candidate, but TNT episodes were unaffected.

=== Non-Hodgkin's lymphoma diagnosis ===
Thompson was diagnosed with non-Hodgkin's lymphoma (NHL), a form of cancer, in 2004. In 2007, Thompson stated, "I have had no illness from it, or even any symptoms. My life expectancy should not be affected. I am in remission, and it is very treatable with drugs if treatment is needed in the future—and with no debilitating side effects." Reportedly indolent, Thompson's NHL was the lowest of three grades of NHL, and was the rare nodal marginal zone lymphoma. It accounts for only 1–3% of all cases.

=== Political activities ===
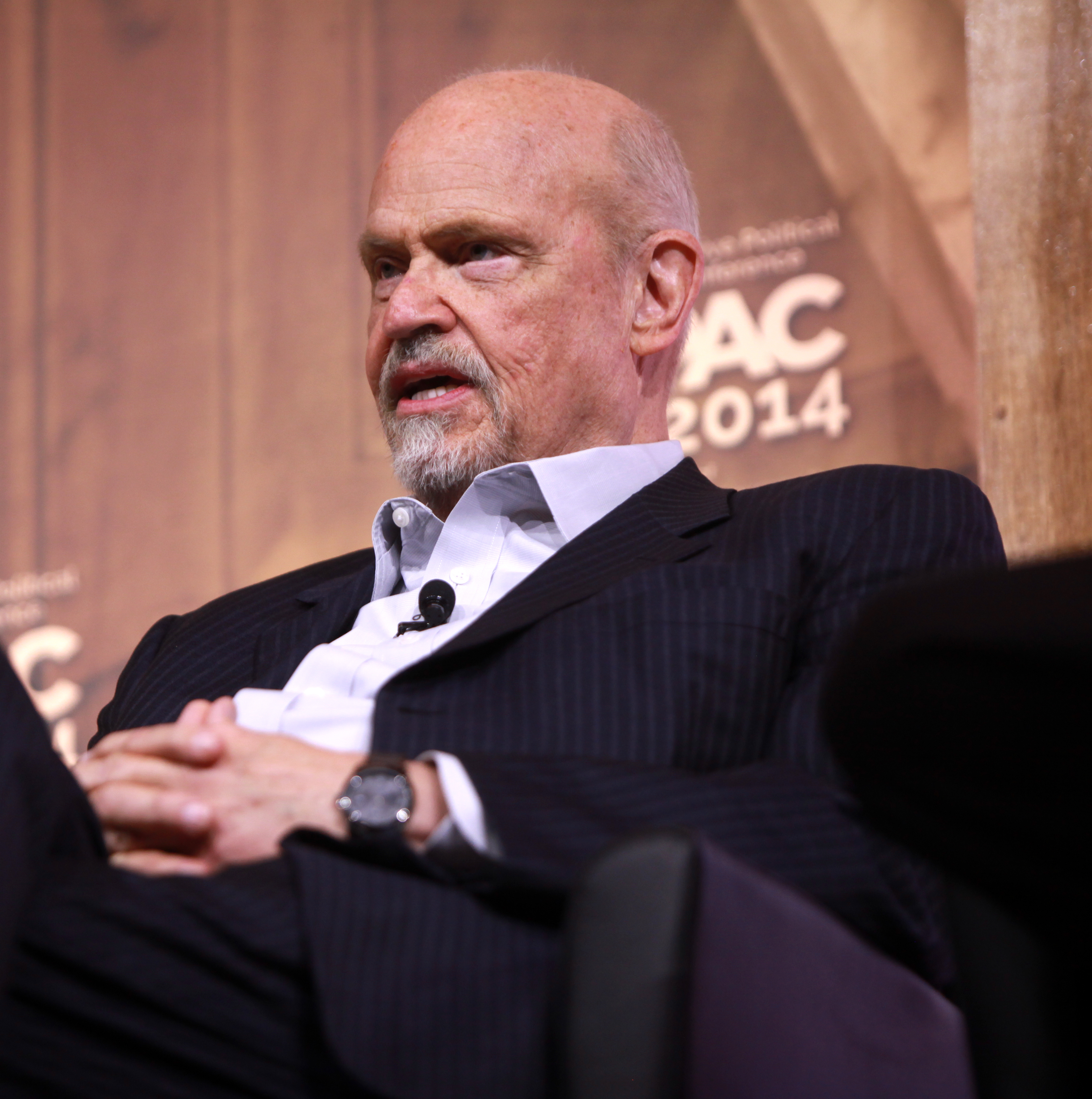
Thompson speaking at the Conservative Political Action Conference (CPAC) in 2014

From 2002 to 2005, Thompson was head of the Federal City Council, a group of business, civic, education, and other leaders interested in economic development in Washington, DC.

In March 2003, Thompson was featured in a commercial by the conservative nonprofit group Citizens United which advocated for the invasion of Iraq, "When people ask what has Saddam done to us, I ask, what had the 9/11 hijackers done to us--before 9/11."

Thompson did voice-over work at the 2004 Republican National Convention. While narrating a video for that convention, Thompson observed: "History throws you what it throws you, and you never know what's coming."

After the retirement of Supreme Court Associate Justice Sandra Day O'Connor in 2005, President George W. Bush appointed Thompson to an informal position to help guide the nomination of John Roberts through the United States Senate confirmation process. He shared this advisory role to the nominee, a role commonly dubbed "sherpa", with former Republican National Committee chairman Ed Gillespie. Roberts's nomination as associate justice was cancelled following the death of Chief Justice William Rehnquist; he was renominated and confirmed as Chief Justice instead.

Until July 2007, Thompson was Chair of the International Security Advisory Board, a bipartisan advisory panel that reports to the Secretary of State and focuses on emerging strategic threats. In that capacity, he advised the State Department about all aspects of arms control, disarmament, international security, and related aspects of public diplomacy.

=== Legal defense for Lewis Libby ===
In 2006, he served on the advisory board of the legal defense fund for I. Lewis "Scooter" Libby Jr., who was indicted and later convicted of lying to federal investigators during their investigation of the Plame affair. Thompson, who had never met Libby before volunteering for the advisory board, said he was convinced that Libby was innocent. The Scooter Libby Legal Defense Fund Trust set out to raise more than $5 million to help finance the legal defense of Vice President Dick Cheney's former chief of staff. Thompson hosted a fundraiser for the Libby defense fund at his home in McLean, Virginia. After Bush commuted Libby's sentence, Thompson released a statement: "I am very happy for Scooter Libby. I know that this is a great relief to him, his wife and children. This will allow a good American, who has done a lot for his country, to resume his life."

=== Work as a radio analyst ===
In 2006, he signed on with ABC News Radio to serve as senior analyst and vacation replacement for Paul Harvey. He used that platform to spell out his positions on a number of political issues. A July 3, 2007, update to Thompson's ABC News Radio home page referred to him as a "former ABC News Radio contributor", indicating that Thompson had been released from his contract with the broadcaster. He did not return after his campaign ended.

=== Work as a columnist ===
Thompson signed a deal with Salem Communications's Townhall.com to write for the organization's magazine, Townhall, from April 23, 2007, until August 21, 2007, and again from June 8, 2008, until November 17, 2008.

== 2008 presidential campaign ==
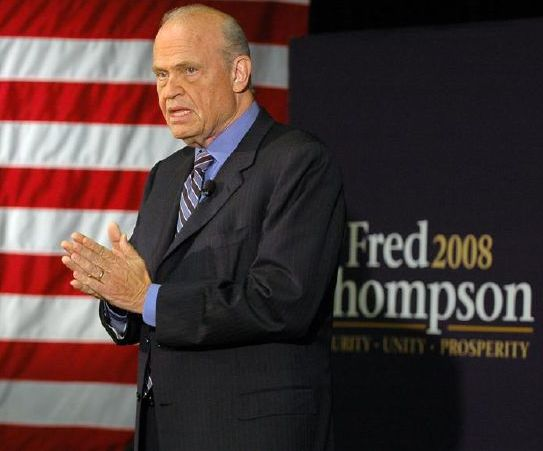
Thompson campaigning in Iowa in 2007

Thompson ran for the Republican nomination in the 2008 United States presidential election cycle. He won 11 delegates in the Republican primaries before dropping out of the race in January 2008.

On March 11, 2007, Thompson appeared on Fox News Sunday to discuss the possibility of a 2008 candidacy for the presidency. Two weeks later Thompson asked to be released from his television contract, potentially in preparation for a presidential bid. Thompson formed a presidential exploratory committee regarding his possible 2008 campaign for president on June 1, 2007, but unlike most candidate exploratory groups, Thompson's organized as a 527 group.

Thompson continued to be mentioned as a potential candidate, but did not officially declare his candidacy. On June 12, he told Jay Leno on The Tonight Show that while he did not crave the presidency itself, he would like to do things that he could only do by holding that office. A New York Times article cited Thompson's aides as saying on July 18 that he planned to enter the race just after Labor Day, followed by a national announcement tour.

On September 5, 2007, Thompson made his candidacy official, announcing on The Tonight Show that "I'm running for president of the United States" and running an ad during a Republican presidential candidates' debate on Fox News. In both instances he pointed people to his campaign website to watch a 15-minute video detailing his platform. His campaign entrance was described as "lackluster" and "awkward" despite high expectations in anticipation of his joining the race. Thompson was endorsed by the Virginia Society for Human Life and several other anti-abortion organizations.

In nationwide polling toward the end of 2007, Thompson's support in the Republican primary election was sliding, with Thompson placing either third or fourth in polls. On January 22, 2008, after attracting little support in the early primaries, he confirmed that he had withdrawn from the presidential race. In a statement issued by his campaign he said:

Today I have withdrawn my candidacy for President of the United States. I hope that my country and my party have benefited from our having made this effort. Jeri and I will always be grateful for the encouragement and friendship of so many wonderful people.

== Post-presidential campaign ==
=== Political activities ===
Thompson spoke at the 2008 Republican National Convention on September 2 in Minnesota, where he described in graphic detail presumptive Republican nominee John McCain's torture at the hands of the North Vietnamese during his imprisonment and gave an endorsement of McCain for president.

Thompson campaigned in support of the National Popular Vote Interstate Compact.

=== Acting career ===
Thompson signed an agreement to be represented as an actor by the William Morris Agency. In 2009, he returned to acting with a guest appearance on the ABC television series Life on Mars, and as William Jennings Bryan in the TV movie Alleged (2010), based on the Scopes Monkey Trial. Thompson portrayed Frank Michael Thomas in the CBS series The Good Wife, based on himself. He also had roles in Disney's Secretariat (2010) and the horror film Sinister (2012). In 2014, he appeared in the film Persecuted, focusing on religious freedom, government surveillance, and censorship.

=== Radio career ===
On March 2, 2009, he took over Westwood One's East Coast noon time slot, hosting the talk radio program The Fred Thompson Show, after Bill O'Reilly ended The Radio Factor. It was co-hosted for a time by his wife, Jeri. Thompson's final show for Westwood One was aired on January 21, 2011. Douglas Urbanski took Thompson's place in the Westwood One syndication lineup.

=== Work as an advertising spokesman ===
In May 2010, Thompson became an advertising spokesman for American Advisors Group, a reverse mortgage lender.

=== Memoir ===
Thompson's memoir, Teaching the Pig to Dance: A Memoir of Growing up and Second Chances, was published in 2010.

=== Death and funeral ===
On the morning of November 1, 2015, Thompson died at the age of 73; the cause of death was a recurrence of lymphoma. His funeral was held on November 6, 2015, in Nashville with U.S. Senators John McCain and Lamar Alexander in attendance. He was interred at Mimosa Cemetery in Lawrenceburg, Tennessee later that day.

The Fred D. Thompson U.S. Courthouse and Federal Building was named in his honor pursuant to legislation signed into law in June 2017.

== Political positions ==
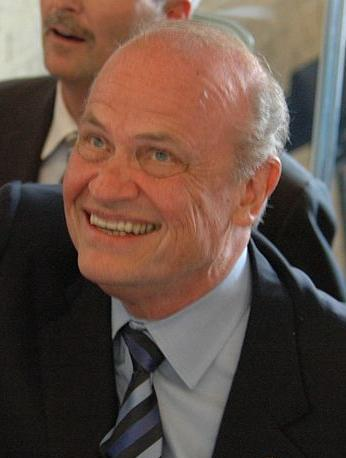
Thompson in Dallas on July 25, 2007

Thompson said that federalism was his "lodestar", which provides "a basis for a proper analysis of most issues: 'Is this something government should be doing? If so, at what level of government?'"

Thompson said that "Roe v. Wade was bad law and bad medical science"; he felt that judges should not be determining social policy. However, he also said that the government should not criminally prosecute women who undergo early-term abortions. He did not support a federal ban on gay marriage, but would have supported a constitutional amendment to keep a state's recognition of such marriages from resulting in all states having to recognize them.

Thompson said that citizens are entitled to keep and bear arms if they do not have criminal records. The Gun Owners of America says that he voted pro-gun in 20 of 33 gun-related votes during his time in the Senate.

Thompson said that U.S. borders should be secured before considering comprehensive immigration reform, but he also supported a path to citizenship for illegal aliens saying, "You're going to have to, in some way, work out a deal where they can have some aspirations of citizenship, but not make it so easy that it's unfair to the people waiting in line and abiding by the law." Thompson supported the U.S. 2003 invasion of Iraq, and was opposed to withdrawing troops, but believed that "mistakes have been made" since the invasion.

Thompson initially supported the McCain–Feingold campaign finance legislation, but he later said that certain parts should be repealed. He was skeptical that human efforts cause global warming and pointed to parallel warming on Mars and other planets as an example.

== Filmography ==
Thompson's acting roles were credited as Fred Dalton Thompson, unless otherwise noted.

=== Film ===
Year	Title	Role	Notes
1985	Marie	Himself	debut, credited as Fred Thompson
1987	No Way Out	CIA Director Marshall	
1988	Feds	Bill Bilecki	
1989	Fat Man and Little Boy	Major General Melrose Hayden Barry	
1990	The Hunt for Red October	Rear Admiral Joshua Painter	
1990	Days of Thunder	Big John	
1990	Die Hard 2	Ed Trudeau	
1991	Flight of the Intruder	JAGC Captain at Court-Martial	Uncredited
1991	Class Action	Dr. Getchell	
1991	Necessary Roughness	Carver Purcell	
1991	Cape Fear	Tom Broadbent	
1991	Curly Sue	Bernie Oxbar	
1992	Aces: Iron Eagle III	Stockman	
1992	Thunderheart	William Dawes	
1992	White Sands	Arms dealer	Uncredited
1993	Born Yesterday	Sen. Hedges	
1993	In the Line of Fire	White House Chief of Staff Harry Sargent	
1994	Baby's Day Out	FBI Agent Dale Grissom	
2002	Download This	Himself	
2005	Racing Stripes	Sir Trenton	Voice
2005	Looking for Comedy in the Muslim World	Himself	
2010	The Genesis Code	Judge Hardin	
2010	Secretariat	Arthur "Bull" Hancock	
2010	Ironmen	Governor Neeley	
2010	Alleged	William Jennings Bryan	credited as Sen. Fred Dalton Thompson
2012	The Last Ride	O'Keefe	
2012	Sinister	Sheriff	
2013	Unlimited	Harold Finch	
2014	Persecuted	Fr. Charles Luther	
2014	23 Blast	Coach Powers	
2015	A Larger Life	Robert Parker	
2015	90 Minutes in Heaven	Jay B. Perkins	
2016	God's Not Dead 2	Senior Pastor	posthumous release, credited as Fred Thompson

=== Television ===
Year	Series	Role	Episode count
1988	Wiseguy	Knox Pooley	3 episodes
1988	Unholy Matrimony	Frank Sweeny	TV movie
1989	China Beach	Lt. Col. Reinhardt	1 episode
1989	Roseanne	Keith Faber	1 episode
1989	Matlock	Gordon Lewis	2 episodes
1989	In the Heat of the Night	Tommy	Season 2 - Episode 18
1992	Bed of Lies	Richard 'Racehorse' Haynes	TV movie
1992	Stay the Night	Det. Malone	TV movie
1992	Day-O	Frank DeGeorgio	TV movie
1992	Keep the Change	Otis	TV movie
1993	Matlock	Prosecutor McGonigal	1 episode
1993	Barbarians at the Gate	James D. Robinson III	TV movie
2000	Sex and the City	Politician on TV	1 episode
2001	Rachel and Andrew Jackson: A Love Story	President Andrew Jackson	Voice, TV movie
2002–2007	Law & Order	D.A. Arthur Branch	116 episodes
2003–2006	Law & Order: Special Victims Unit	D.A. Arthur Branch	11 episodes
2004	Evel Knievel	Jay Sarno	TV movie
2005–2006	Law & Order: Trial by Jury	D.A. Arthur Branch	13 episodes
2005	Law & Order: Criminal Intent	D.A. Arthur Branch	1 episode
2006	Conviction	D.A. Arthur Branch	1 episode
2007	Bury My Heart at Wounded Knee	President Ulysses S. Grant	TV movie, credited as Fred Thompson
2009	Life on Mars	NYPD Chief Harry Woolf	1 episode
2011–2012	The Good Wife	Frank Michael Thomas	2 episodes
2015	Allegiance	FBI Director	4 episodes

== Book authored ==
- At That Point in Time: The Inside Story of the Senate Watergate Committee. New York: Quadrangle. 1975. ISBN 978-0812905366.
- Teaching the Pig to Dance: A Memoir of Growing Up and Second Chances. New York: Crown Forum. 2010. ISBN 978-0307460288.

== Electoral history ==
Tennessee United States Senate Election, 1996
Party	Candidate	Votes	%	±%
Republican	Fred Thompson (Incumbent)	1,091,554	61.37%	+0.93%
Democratic	Houston Gordon	654,937	36.82%	
Independent	John Jay Hooker	14,401	0.81%	
Majority		436,617	24.55%	+2.72%
Republican hold		Swing		

Tennessee United States Senate Election, 1994 (Special)
Party	Candidate	Votes	%	±%
Republican	Fred Thompson	885,998	60.44%	
Democratic	Jim Cooper	565,930	38.61%	
Majority		320,068	21.83%	−16.07%
Republican gain from Democratic		Swing		

== See also ==
- List of United States senators from Tennessee

Party political offices
Preceded by William Hawkins	Republican nominee for United States Senator from Tennessee (Class 2); 1994, 1996	Succeeded by Lamar Alexander
U.S. Senate
Preceded by Harlan Mathews	U.S. Senator (Class 2) from Tennessee; 1994–2003; Served alongside: Jim Sasser, Bill Frist	Succeeded by Lamar Alexander
Preceded by Ted Stevens	Chair of the Senate Governmental Affairs Committee; 1997–2001	Succeeded by Joe Lieberman
Preceded by Joe Lieberman	Chair of the Senate Governmental Affairs Committee; 2001	Succeeded by Joe Lieberman
