= Tennessee Commissioner of Correction =

Tennessee, United States government office

Commissioner	Governor
Lewis S. Pope	Austin Peay IV
Richard Lyle	Henry Hollis Horton
Edwin W. Cocke	Harry Hill McAlister
Barton Brown	Harry Hill McAlister
George Cate, Sr.	Gordon Browning
Andrew T. Taylor	Prentice Cooper
W.O. Baird	Prentice Cooper
W.O. Baird	Jim Nance McCord
Keith Hampton	Frank G. Clement
Keith Hampton	Buford Ellington
Harry S. Avery	Frank G. Clement
Harry S. Avery	Buford Ellington
Lake F. Russell	Buford Ellington
Mark Luttrell	Winfield Dunn
Herman Yeatman	Ray Blanton
C. Murray Henderson	Ray Blanton
Harold B. Bradley	Lamar Alexander
William Long	Lamar Alexander
Ernest Pellegrin	Lamar Alexander
Stephen H. Norris	Lamar Alexander
Stephen H. Norris	Ned McWherter
W. Jeff Reynolds	Ned McWherter
Christine J. Bradley	Ned McWherter
Donal Campbell	Donald K. Sundquist
Quenton I. White	Phil Bredesen
George Little	Phil Bredesen
Derrick Schofield	Bill Haslam
Tony C. Parker	Bill Haslam
Lisa Helton	Bill Lee
Frank Strada	Bill Lee

The Tennessee Commissioner of Correction is the head of the Tennessee Department of Correction, which supervises inmates in the state prisons of the U.S. state of Tennessee. The incumbent Commissioner of Correction is Frank Strada, who took office on January 9, 2023.

== Functionality ==
The Commissioner is appointed by the governor of Tennessee and is a member of the governor's Cabinet, which meets at least once per month, or more often to the governor's liking. By statute, the Commissioner must be over the age of 25 with training and experience in institutional operation and management. The Commissioner is also authorized to appoint a secretary and stenographer for the Department, who have charge of and keep a record of the transactions of the department. The Commissioner has the same power as a judge of the court of general sessions to administer oaths, and to enforce the attendance and testimony of witnesses.

== History ==
Tennessee's first central prison, the Tennessee State Penitentiary, was first established in 1831 after legislation had been passed two years earlier. The Board of Inspectors consisted of five members including the Governor and the Secretary of State. In 1871 the position of Superintendent of Prisons was created, and in 1902 the Tennessee General Assembly passed legislation for a Board of Prison Commissioners. In 1915 the General Assembly created the State Board of Controls to manage charity, penal, and reformatory institutions. This, in turn, was replaced by an Administration of State Institutions made up of the Governor, the State Treasurer, and a general manager of State Organizations.

In 1923 legislative reform brought the first administration of the penal, charitable, and reformatory institutions by a Department of Institutions headed by a Commissioner of Institutions. In 1929 the Advisory Board of Pardons was established, which created a system of parole eligibility in 1931. The advisory board would be usurped by a Board of Pardons and Paroles, with appointments made by the Governor and the Chairman being the Commissioner of Institutions. Later on in 1979, after a series of changes, the Board would become autonomous of the Department, with the Chairman being appointed by the Governor and the Board's membership being increased to five.

In 1937 the Department's name was changed to the Department of Institutions and Public Welfare, receiving various responsibilities that today might be handled by the modern Department of Veterans Affairs, the Department of Education, and the Department of Mental Health and Developmental Disabilities. In 1939 this Department was split into the Department of Institutions, and a separate Department of Public Welfare, with mental health facilities being transferred to a Department of Mental Health in 1953.

In 1955 the department arrived at its present name, the Tennessee Department of Correction. In 1979 the five-year residency requirement for the Commissioner was lifted, and the Commissioner was authorized to contract with local governments when prisons became overcrowded. To the right is a table of Commissioners who have filled the function the modern Commissioner of Corrections fills today and the governors they have served under.
