= 1996 United States Senate election in Tennessee =

- November 5, 1996
- Turnout: 62.77% ▲6.15 pp
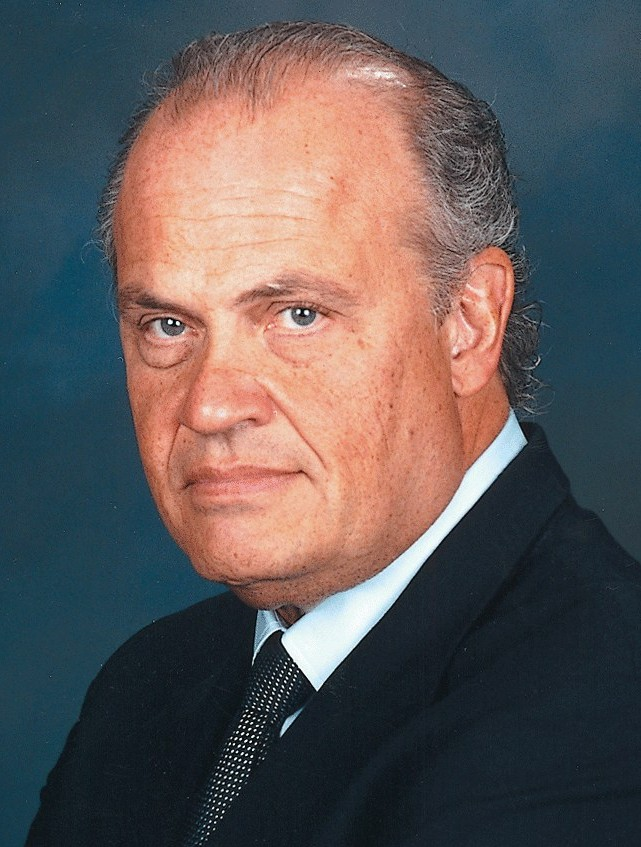

Nominee	Fred Thompson	Houston Gordon
Party	Republican	Democratic
Popular vote	1,091,554	654,937
Percentage	61.37%	36.82%
- County results Thompson: 50–60% 60—70% 70–80% Gordon: 50–60% 60–70%
U.S. senator before election
Fred Thompson
Republican
Elected U.S. Senator
Fred Thompson
Republican

The 1996 Tennessee United States Senate election was held on November 5, 1996, to elect the U.S. Senator from the state of Tennessee. Republican Senator Fred Thompson ran for re-election to a full six-year term. Thompson defeated the Democratic challenger, Covington lawyer Houston Gordon in the general election. This is the last time that Tennessee voted for a Senate candidate and a presidential candidate of different political parties.

== Candidates ==
=== Democratic Party ===
- Houston Gordon, attorney

=== Republican Party ===
- Fred Thompson, incumbent U.S. Senator

== Election results ==
United States Senate election in Tennessee, 1996
Party	Candidate	Votes	%	±%
Republican	Fred Thompson (Incumbent)	1,091,554	61.37%	+0.93%
Democratic	Houston Gordon	654,937	36.82%	−1.79%
Independent	John Jay Hooker	14,401	0.81%	
Independent	Bruce Gold	5,865	0.33%	
Independent	Robert O. Watson	5,569	0.31%	
Independent	Greg Samples	4,104	0.23%	
Independent	Philip L. Kienlen	2,173	0.12%	
Write-ins		61	0.00%	
Majority		436,617	24.55%	+2.71%
Turnout		1,778,664		
Republican hold				

== See also ==
- 1996 United States presidential election in Tennessee
- 1996 United States House of Representatives elections in Tennessee
- 1996 United States Senate elections
