= Jeri Kehn Thompson =

American radio talk show host and commentator

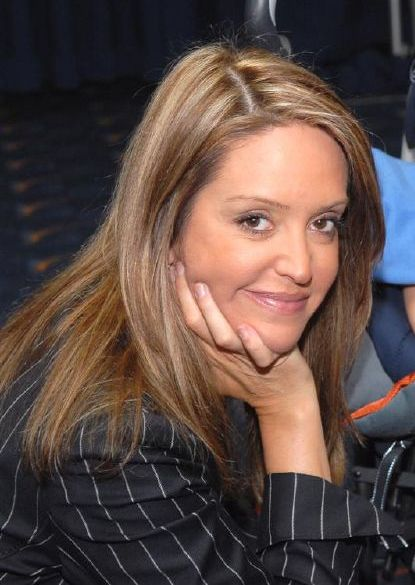
- Thompson in 2007
- Born: Jeri L. Kehn; September 30, 1966 (age 59); Hastings, Nebraska, U.S.
- Education: DePauw University
- Political party: Republican
- Spouse: Fred Dalton Thompson (m. 2002; died 2015)
- Children: 2

Jeri Kehn Thompson (born September 30, 1966) is an American radio talk show host, columnist for The American Spectator, political commentator, and former political consultant for the Washington, D.C. law firm of Verner Liipfert. She has also worked for the Senate Republican Conference and the Republican National Committee. She was also employed with the public relations and lobbying firm Burson-Marsteller.

From 2002 until his death in 2015, Thompson was married to Fred Thompson, former United States Senator, lawyer, lobbyist, screen actor, and 2008 U.S. Republican Party presidential candidate.

== Early life ==
Thompson is a native of Hastings, Nebraska, but grew up in Naperville, Illinois, with her mother Vicki, stepfather Ron Keller, and a younger sister. She graduated with a degree in English literature from Indiana's DePauw University in 1988 and was a member of the Pi Beta Phi sorority.

== Marriage and family ==
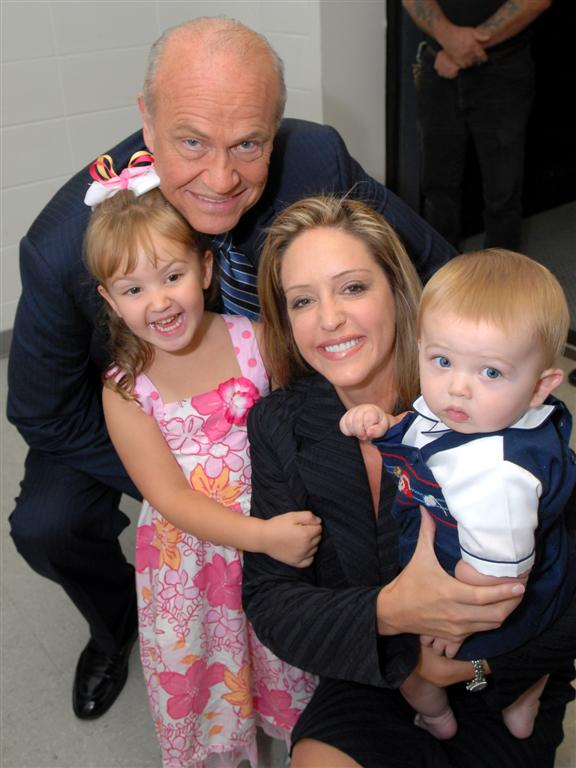
Thompson family.

Jeri Kehn and Fred Thompson first met on July 4, 1996, while both were in the checkout line at a Kroger supermarket. They were married on June 29, 2002, at First Congregational United Church of Christ in Naperville. It was her first marriage and Fred Thompson's second.

On September 27, 2003, she gave birth to a daughter, Hayden. A second child, Samuel, was born in November 2006.

When they married in 2002, she was 35 years old and he was 59. A New York Times article dated July 8, 2007 considered whether the so-called "May–December marriage" could become a campaign issue, noting that "she is not a homewrecker" and is "accomplished in her own right".

In mid-December 2007, the Associated Press asked some of the 2008 candidates what their favorite possession was. Fred Thompson responded tongue-in-cheek, "trophy wife."

== Political involvement ==
According to news reports, Thompson wielded considerable influence within her husband's presidential campaign, as a top political adviser. She urged her husband to run, recruited some of his staff, and was reportedly responsible for the dismissal of others. She is a board member of Susan B. Anthony List.
