= Umm Hajul controversy =

The Umm Hajul controversy was one of many cases of friendly fire committed during the Persian Gulf War. After American forces accidentally opened fire on their own men, a cover-up was attempted. A plot element of the movie Courage Under Fire was based on this particular incident.

== Incident ==
In the predawn hours of February 27, 1991, an armored personnel carrier of the 1st Armored Division broke down near the airfield of Umm Hajul. The five operators of the vehicle, U.S. Army engineers, found themselves stranded in the desert when M1A1 tank and Bradley Fighting Vehicle units of the 3rd Armored Cavalry Regiment approached from the north. Specialist Craig Walker tried signaling to the approaching forces by switching his night vision goggles on and off. The armored cavalry troop had been told the airfield was defended by 500+ Iraqi soldiers, and to expect stiff resistance. The troop commander fired warning shots in the air after requesting permission to do so from his squadron commander. Some of the cavalry troopers saw returned fire, but whether this came from the engineers is doubtful. The cavalry troop vehicles opened fire on the engineers with high-explosive rounds, mistaking their vehicle for an enemy position. The result of the high-explosive rounds set off demolition charges within the engineers' armored personnel carrier. The situation progressed for about seven minutes, with the troop commander calling cease fire after two volleys, thinking the "enemy forces" were contained and waiting for them to surrender. The squadron commander then arrived on the scene in his Bradley Fighting Vehicle and opened fire when he thought one of the engineers, still believed to be Iraqis, was trying to escape. When the shooting was over, one engineer was wounded and another, Corporal Lance Fielder of Tennessee, was dead from coaxial machinegun fire.

== Coverup ==
Shortly after the incident, false reports were filed, stating that the 3rd Cavalry took an estimated 50 Iraqi prisoners in the assault. Three Bronze Stars were awarded on the basis of misleading statements and representations, as well. The squadron commander was the son-in-law of a famous Vietnam-era general, and his brothers-in-law were also general officers. He did not face repercussions and was selected for promotion to colonel. Both the cavalry troop commander and the lieutenant in charge of the engineers at the airfield were given career-ending evaluations and forced out of the Army. This was particularly ironic, since the lieutenant was completely not culpable. Many discrepancies uncovered in three army investigations were overlooked or ignored, and several lower-ranking soldiers and officers were threatened or coerced into remaining silent.

== Investigation ==
U.S. Senator Fred Thompson of Tennessee initiated a Congressional investigation into this incident, in which Corporal Lance Fielder of Nashville, Tennessee had died. The investigation resulted in the forced retirement of the squadron commander of the unit that fired shots at Fielder and others, his reduction in rank to major, and revocation of medals.
