= First Steps (1985 film) =

1985 American television film

- Genre: Biography; Drama
- Written by: Sheldon Larry
- Directed by: Rod Browning
- Starring: Amy Steel; Judd Hirsch; Kim Darby
- Music by: Leonard Rosenman
- Country of origin: United States
- Original language: English

Production
- Executive producer: Samuel Benedict
- Producer: Ellis A. Cohen
- Production locations: Illinois & Michigan Canal National Heritage Corridor, Illinois; North Park University - 3225 W. Foster Avenue, North Park, Chicago, Illinois
- Cinematography: Jack L. Richards
- Editor: Benjamin A. Weissman
- Running time: 120 min.
- Production company: CBS

Original release
- Network: CBS
- Release: March 19, 1985

First Steps is a 1985 American made-for-television biographical drama film directed by Rod Browning and starring Amy Steel, Judd Hirsch and Kim Darby. The film is based on a series of segments from 60 Minutes.

== Plot ==
In 1982, Dr. Jerrold S. Petrofsky is demonstrating to an assembled press conference how Nan Davis, paralyzed in a 1978 car accident, is able to take several steps using his computer-feedback controls. In a series of flashbacks, starting in 1969, Dr. Petrofsky is shown experimenting with an old computer. This leads to him becoming fascinated by muscle dynamics. In an attempt to start a relationship, he finds himself intrigued and attracted to a woman named Sherry, who understands and respects his passion for his work. Moving from St. Louis University to Wright State University in Dayton, Ohio, he continues his efforts to stimulate paralyzed muscles and it is there that he begins to work with Nan and other paraplegics.

Due to how recent Nan's paralysis is, her leg muscles are strong enough to partake in Dr. Petrofsky's experiments. In order to keep funding for further research, he realizes he needs publicity and soon, the duo begin to do interviews on several television programs to explain the research and the science behind his experiments. To the dismay of some of his colleagues, Dr. Petrofsky states that Nan will be able to walk at her college graduation ceremony despite limited results. Determined to keep his word, with further research and experiments, Nan is able to take 10 steps to receive her diploma with the help from her doctor and an aide.

== Cast ==
- Amy Steel as Nan Davis
- Judd Hirsch as Dr. Jerrold S. Petrofsky
- Kim Darby as Sherry Petrosky
- Frances Lee McCain as Louis Davis
- John Pankow as Fred
- James Sikking as Jim Davis
- David Packer as Brian
- Ned Schmidtke as Dr. Chandler Phillips
- Lucinda Jenney as Carolyn
- Alan Ruck as Dave
- Megan Mullally as Cathy
