= Tennessee Department of Veterans Services =

Government agency in Tennessee, United States

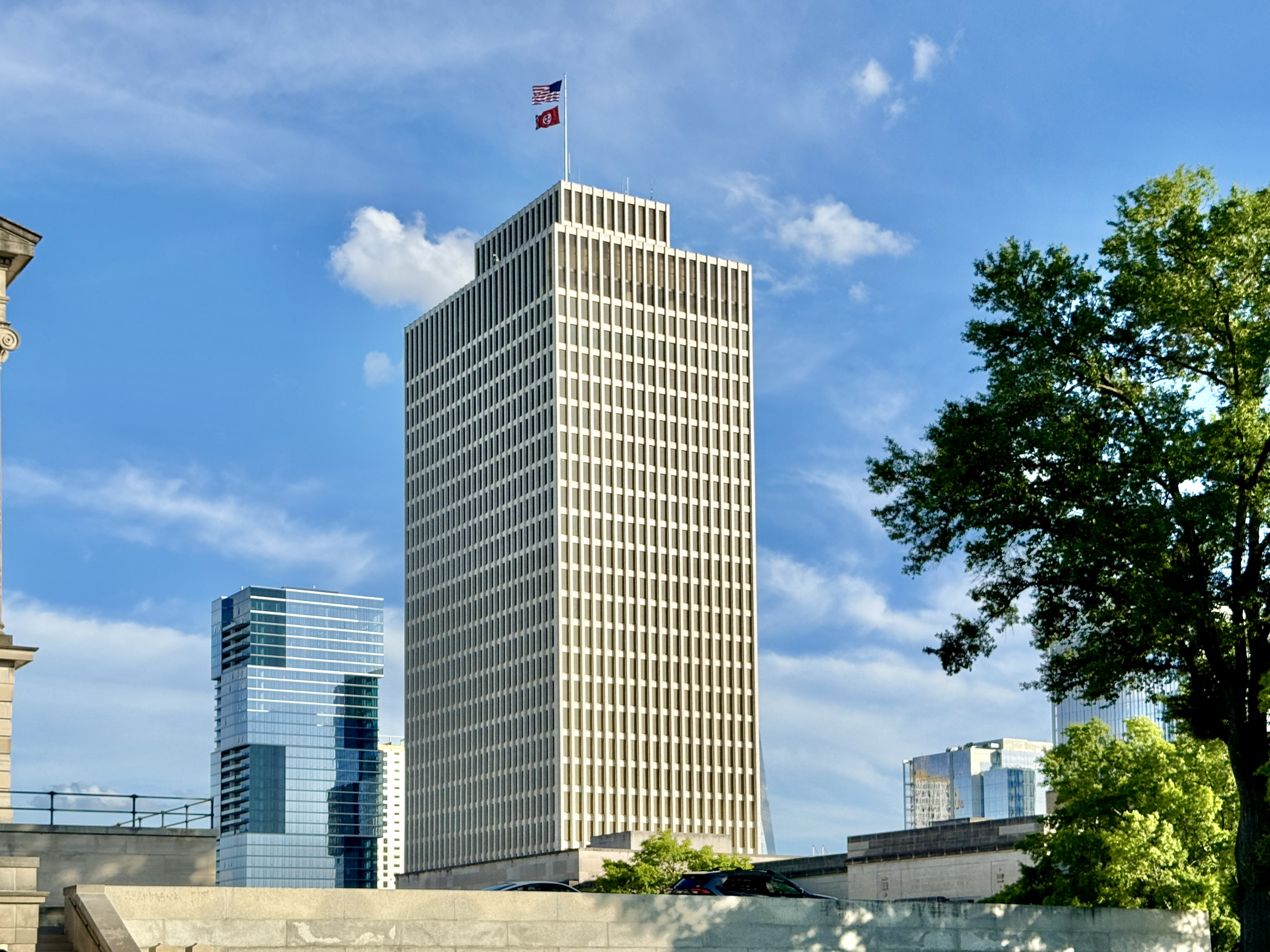
- The Tennessee Department of Veterans Services is headquartered in the William R. Snodgrass Tennessee Tower in Nashville.

Department of Veterans Services overview
- Formed: 1945
- Jurisdiction: Tennessee
- Commissioner responsible: Tommy H Baker
- Website: The Tennessee Department of Veterans Services website

The Tennessee Department of Veterans Services (TDVS) is the head of Tennessee's Department of Veterans Affairs, which is responsible for veterans benefits programs within the state. The Commissioner is appointed by the governor of Tennessee and is a member of the governor's Cabinet, which meets at least once per month, or more often to the governor's liking.

The position of Commissioner was first created in 1945, along with the department it heads, but in 1959 the department became a staff division under the governor's office headed by a director. The position of Commissioner was recreated in 1975 by the Tennessee General Assembly. It is analogous to the federal Secretary of Veterans Affairs or the Minister of Veterans Affairs of Canada.

According to the Tennessee State Library and Archives, Louis Ragghianti was the first Commissioner after the Department's reinstatement, from 1975 to 1979, under Governor Ray Blanton. William H. Roden, Jr. was the Commissioner under the administration of Lamar Alexander. William D. "Bill" Manning, appointed in 1987, was the Commissioner under Ned Ray McWherter, and Fred Tucker was the Commissioner of Veterans Services under Don Sundquist. Under Bill Haslam, Many-Bears Grinder held the position. Courtney Rogers was appointed in 2019 by Bill Lee, until 2021. The current Commissioner, under the administration of Bill Lee, is Tommy H. Baker.
