= 1972 United States Senate election in Tennessee =

- November 7, 1972
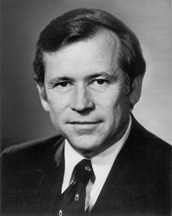

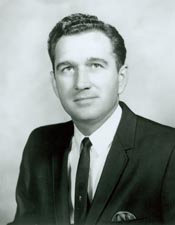
Nominee	Howard Baker	Ray Blanton
Party	Republican	Democratic
Popular vote	716,539	440,599
Percentage	61.55%	37.85%
- Baker: 40–50% 50–60% 60–70% 70–80% 80–90% Blanton: 40–50% 50–60% 60–70%
Senator before election
Howard Baker
Republican
Elected Senator
Howard Baker
Republican

The 1972 United States Senate election in Tennessee took place on November 7, 1972, concurrently with the U.S. presidential election, other elections to the United States Senate in other states, elections to the United States House of Representatives, and various state and local elections. Incumbent Republican U.S. Senator Howard Baker won re-election to a second term, becoming the first Republican senator in the state to ever do so.

== Republican primary ==
9.1% of the voting age population participated in the Republican primary.

=== Nominee ===
- Howard Baker, incumbent U.S. senator

Republican primary results
Party	Candidate	Votes	%
Republican	Howard Baker (incumbent)	242,733	97.0%
Republican	Hubert Patty	7,581	3.0%
Total votes		250,314	100.0%

== Democratic primary ==
13.9% of the voting age population participated in the Democratic primary.

=== Nominee ===
- Ray Blanton, U.S. representative

Democratic primary results
Party	Candidate	Votes	%
Democratic	Ray Blanton	292,249	76.4%
Democratic	Don Palmer	40,700	10.6%
Democratic	Herman Frey	18,814	4.9%
Democratic	Ron Stinnett	15,804	4.1%
Democratic	Raymond Gibbs	14,941	3.9%
Democratic	Other	12	0.0%
Total votes		382,520	100.0%

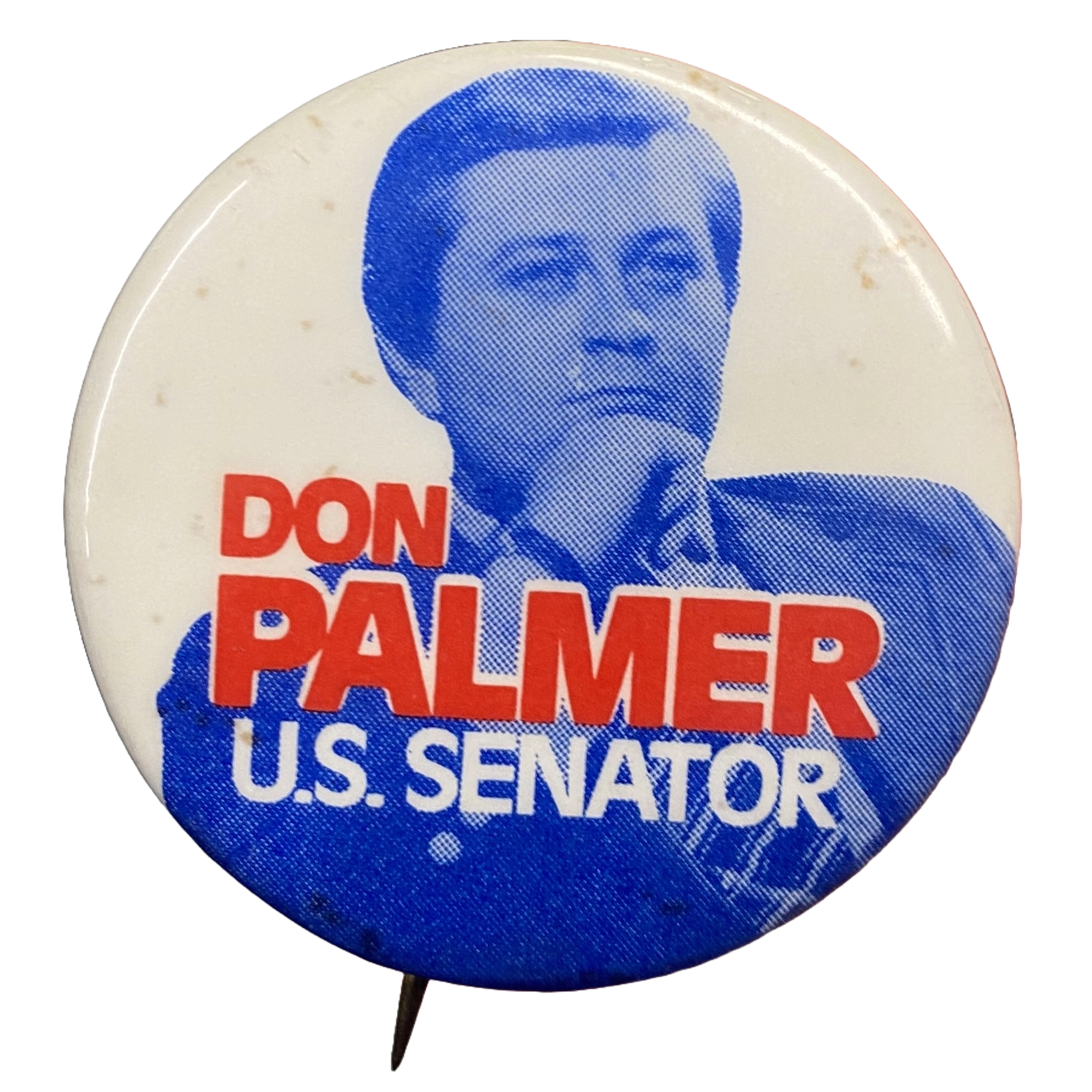
Button for Don Palmer, Blanton's strongest opponent

== General election ==
1972 United States Senate election in Tennessee
Party	Candidate	Votes	%	±%
Republican	Howard Baker (incumbent)	716,539	61.55%	+5.85%
Democratic	Ray Blanton	440,599	37.85%	+6.46%
Independent	Dan East	7,026	0.60%	N/A
Other		31	0.00%	N/A
Majority		275,940	23.70%	+12.30%
Turnout		1,164,195		
Republican hold		Swing		

=== By county ===
County	Howard Baker, Jr. Republican		Ray Blanton Democratic		Other votes		Total votes
County	%	#	%	#	%	#	Total votes
Anderson	62.8%	13,403	36.9%	7,868	0.3%	55	21,326
Bedford	50.6%	3,600	48.5%	3,448	0.9%	65	7,113
Benton	43.5%	1,848	56.0%	2,379	0.4%	19	4,246
Bledsoe	60.4%	1,878	39.1%	1,217	0.5%	14	3,109
Blount	69.2%	15,030	30.4%	6,601	0.4%	86	21,717
Bradley	73.5%	9,776	26.0%	3,465	0.5%	63	13,304
Campbell	64.7%	4,323	34.8%	2,329	0.5%	33	6,685
Cannon	52.2%	1,381	47.2%	1,249	0.5%	14	2,644
Carroll	50.3%	4,255	49.1%	4,153	0.5%	43	8,451
Carter	78.0%	10,354	21.5%	2,858	0.5%	62	13,274
Cheatham	44.4%	1,536	55.0%	1,905	0.6%	21	3,462
Chester	44.5%	1,817	55.0%	2,244	0.4%	18	4,079
Claiborne	64.5%	3,175	35.2%	1,731	0.3%	13	4,919
Clay	52.5%	857	46.9%	766	0.6%	10	1,633
Cocke	78.2%	4,735	21.5%	1,301	0.3%	18	6,054
Coffee	54.7%	5,203	45.3%	4,309	0.0%	0	9,512
Crockett	59.0%	2,016	41.0%	1,399	0.0%	0	3,415
Cumberland	66.1%	4,137	33.5%	2,094	0.4%	24	6,255
Davidson	56.2%	73,272	43.3%	56,472	0.5%	627	130,371
Decatur	44.2%	1,715	55.5%	2,150	0.3%	11	3,876
DeKalb	49.5%	1,620	49.5%	1,621	0.9%	31	3,272
Dickson	44.8%	2,789	54.4%	3,389	0.8%	51	6,229
Dyer	61.1%	4,657	37.9%	2,889	0.9%	71	7,617
Fayette	49.4%	2,756	50.0%	2,791	0.6%	35	5,582
Fentress	67.5%	1,930	32.0%	915	0.5%	13	2,858
Franklin	48.1%	3,508	51.6%	3,765	0.3%	24	7,297
Gibson	52.7%	7,117	46.7%	6,309	0.7%	89	13,515
Giles	40.8%	2,028	58.4%	2,902	0.7%	36	4,966
Grainger	71.4%	2,635	28.1%	1,038	0.4%	15	3,688
Greene	71.1%	9,003	28.4%	3,604	0.5%	64	12,671
Grundy	46.1%	1,187	53.4%	1,375	0.5%	13	2,575
Hamblen	67.3%	7,769	32.3%	3,726	0.4%	44	11,539
Hamilton	71.2%	55,129	28.3%	21,932	0.5%	403	77,464
Hancock	72.4%	1,603	26.3%	583	1.3%	28	2,214
Hardeman	42.1%	2,378	57.0%	3,214	0.9%	51	5,643
Hardin	49.7%	2,985	50.2%	3,019	0.1%	6	6,010
Hawkins	69.8%	7,322	27.7%	2,907	2.5%	257	10,486
Haywood	47.1%	2,501	51.9%	2,756	1.1%	56	5,313
Henderson	60.0%	4,159	39.6%	2,744	0.3%	23	6,926
Henry	45.5%	3,430	53.8%	4,058	0.8%	57	7,545
Hickman	36.2%	1,284	63.1%	2,236	0.7%	24	3,544
Houston	39.1%	644	59.7%	983	1.2%	20	1,647
Humphreys	41.5%	1,699	57.2%	2,340	1.3%	54	4,093
Jackson	38.2%	807	61.2%	1,293	0.6%	12	2,112
Jefferson	68.6%	4,986	31.0%	2,255	0.4%	30	7,271
Johnson	82.2%	3,089	16.5%	620	1.3%	47	3,756
Knox	68.7%	61,478	30.8%	27,573	0.5%	442	89,493
Lake	48.3%	757	50.6%	793	1.1%	18	1,568
Lauderdale	48.1%	2,627	51.0%	2,784	1.0%	53	5,464
Lawrence	52.1%	5,115	47.2%	4,631	0.7%	67	9,813
Lewis	35.5%	847	64.5%	1,539	0.0%	0	2,386
Lincoln	45.6%	2,407	53.8%	2,836	0.6%	31	5,274
Loudon	65.1%	4,794	34.7%	2,555	0.2%	15	7,364
Macon	67.4%	2,099	32.6%	1,015	0.0%	0	3,114
Madison	54.9%	11,569	45.1%	9,499	0.0%	6	21,074
Marion	56.5%	3,294	42.8%	2,499	0.7%	40	5,833
Marshall	45.8%	2,043	53.8%	2,401	0.4%	19	4,463
Maury	58.8%	6,335	40.7%	4,387	0.5%	54	10,776
McMinn	65.3%	6,878	34.2%	3,603	0.5%	49	10,530
McNairy	43.1%	2,962	56.4%	3,869	0.5%	34	6,865
Meigs	61.7%	966	37.8%	592	0.4%	7	1,565
Monroe	61.8%	5,414	37.9%	3,318	0.3%	22	8,754
Montgomery	50.9%	6,694	48.6%	6,388	0.5%	68	13,150
Moore	46.5%	491	52.9%	559	0.7%	7	1,057
Morgan	56.5%	2,109	43.1%	1,610	0.4%	15	3,734
Obion	48.2%	3,454	50.9%	3,652	0.9%	63	7,169
Overton	47.0%	1,683	52.6%	1,886	0.4%	15	3,584
Perry	38.1%	747	61.5%	1,206	0.4%	8	1,961
Pickett	66.9%	920	33.0%	454	0.1%	2	1,376
Polk	55.6%	2,091	44.1%	1,657	0.3%	11	3,759
Putnam	53.7%	5,416	45.7%	4,602	0.6%	63	10,081
Rhea	64.0%	3,351	36.0%	1,881	0.0%	0	5,232
Roane	61.9%	7,691	37.7%	4,680	0.4%	45	12,416
Robertson	46.1%	3,182	53.2%	3,676	0.7%	51	6,909
Rutherford	57.0%	9,500	42.0%	7,010	1.0%	164	16,674
Scott	74.6%	2,641	25.2%	891	0.2%	6	3,538
Sequatchie	54.9%	1,091	44.5%	884	0.7%	13	1,988
Sevier	80.4%	7,461	18.9%	1,750	0.7%	65	9,276
Shelby	65.2%	148,117	33.9%	77,127	0.9%	1,946	227,190
Smith	47.3%	1,503	51.8%	1,645	0.9%	30	3,178
Stewart	34.4%	658	64.7%	1,237	0.8%	16	1,911
Sullivan	68.3%	26,282	31.1%	11,949	0.6%	225	38,456
Sumner	54.8%	8,055	44.5%	6,531	0.7%	106	14,692
Tipton	60.9%	4,804	38.3%	3,025	0.8%	60	7,889
Trousdale	42.1%	529	57.7%	726	0.2%	3	1,258
Unicoi	75.5%	3,512	24.3%	1,130	0.3%	12	4,654
Union	68.1%	1,745	31.5%	806	0.4%	11	2,562
Van Buren	47.0%	515	52.1%	570	0.9%	10	1,095
Warren	49.1%	2,898	50.0%	2,951	0.9%	51	5,900
Washington	73.2%	16,571	26.1%	5,914	0.7%	158	22,643
Wayne	67.4%	2,422	32.4%	1,166	0.2%	6	3,594
Weakley	49.3%	4,066	50.7%	4,185	0.0%	0	8,251
White	49.8%	1,951	49.4%	1,936	0.7%	29	3,916
Williamson	64.5%	6,444	34.5%	3,444	1.1%	108	9,996
Wilson	53.1%	5,034	46.1%	4,375	0.8%	73	9,482
Total	61.5%	716,539	37.8%	440,599	0.6%	7,057	1,164,195

== See also ==
- 1972 United States presidential election in Tennessee
- 1972 United States Senate elections

== Works cited ==
- Steed, Robert; Moreland, Laurence; Baker, Tod, eds. (1980). Party Politics in the South. Praeger Publishers. ISBN 0030565863.
