= 1972 United States presidential election in Tennessee =

- November 7, 1972

Nominee	Richard Nixon	George McGovern
Party	Republican	Democratic
Home state	California	South Dakota
Running mate	Spiro Agnew	Sargent Shriver
Electoral vote	10	0
Popular vote	813,147	357,293
Percentage	67.70%	29.75%

Nixon
50–60%
60–70%
70–80%
80–90%
McGovern
50–60%
President before election
Richard Nixon
Republican
Elected President
Richard Nixon
Republican

The 1972 United States presidential election in Tennessee took place on November 7, 1972, as part of the 1972 United States presidential election. Tennessee voters chose 10 representatives, or electors, to the Electoral College, who voted for president and vice president.

Tennessee was won by incumbent President Richard Nixon (R–California), with 67.70% of the popular vote, against George McGovern (D–South Dakota), with 29.75% of the popular vote. John G. Schmitz was the only other candidate on the ballot, and, as the candidate for the American Party, he received over 30,000 votes.

Nixon’s victory extended across nearly the entire state. He carried 90 of Tennessee’s 95 counties. The five counties carried by George McGovern were Houston, Jackson, Lewis, Perry, and Stewart. As of 2024, this was the last election in which majority-Black Haywood County voted for a Republican presidential candidate. Alabama and Tennessee were the only states where McGovern won any county that voted for George Wallace in 1968.

Among white voters, 75% supported Nixon while 22% supported McGovern.

== Background ==
Historically Tennessee was the southern state with the strongest amount of Republican support. From 1874 to 1952, the state's two Republican members of the United States House of Representatives were the only Republicans out of the 105 members from the South. From 1966 to 1970, the Republicans won both of Tennessee's seats in the United States Senate, the governorship, and increased its membership in the U.S. House to four of the state's nine seats.

== Results ==
1972 United States presidential election in Tennessee
Party	Candidate	Votes	%
Republican	Richard Nixon (inc.)	813,147	67.70%
Democratic	George McGovern	357,293	29.75%
American	John G. Schmitz	30,373	2.53%
Write-in		369	0.03%
Total votes		1,201,182	100.00%

=== Results by county ===
County	Richard Nixon Republican		George McGovern Democratic		John G. Schmitz American		Various candidates Write-ins		Margin		Total votes cast
County	#	%	#	%	#	%	#	%	#	%	Total votes cast
Anderson	13,865	66.03%	6,713	31.97%	416	1.98%	5	0.02%	7,152	34.06%	20,999
Bedford	4,262	59.73%	2,565	35.95%	302	4.23%	6	0.08%	1,697	23.78%	7,135
Benton	2,614	61.83%	1,479	34.98%	135	3.19%			1,135	26.85%	4,228
Bledsoe	1,952	65.90%	899	30.35%	111	3.75%			1,053	35.55%	2,962
Blount	16,078	73.85%	5,303	24.36%	390	1.79%			10,775	49.49%	21,771
Bradley	10,440	77.26%	2,804	20.75%	269	1.99%			7,636	56.51%	13,513
Campbell	4,909	73.41%	1,629	24.36%	147	2.20%	2	0.03%	3,280	49.05%	6,687
Cannon	1,615	62.38%	911	35.19%	63	2.43%			704	27.19%	2,589
Carroll	5,784	69.28%	2,290	27.43%	275	3.29%			3,494	41.85%	8,349
Carter	11,102	82.15%	2,191	16.21%	217	1.61%	4	0.03%	8,911	65.94%	13,514
Cheatham	2,235	60.10%	1,321	35.52%	163	4.38%			914	24.58%	3,719
Chester	2,787	71.70%	961	24.72%	133	3.42%	6	0.15%	1,826	46.98%	3,887
Claiborne	3,632	73.94%	1,230	25.04%	50	1.02%			2,402	48.90%	4,912
Clay	982	59.01%	648	38.94%	34	2.04%			334	20.07%	1,664
Cocke	5,268	85.62%	805	13.08%	80	1.30%			4,463	72.54%	6,153
Coffee	6,416	66.18%	2,973	30.67%	303	3.13%	3	0.03%	3,443	35.51%	9,695
Crockett	2,642	75.40%	735	20.98%	115	3.28%	12	0.34%	1,907	54.42%	3,504
Cumberland	4,593	73.78%	1,482	23.81%	150	2.41%			3,111	49.97%	6,225
Davidson	82,636	61.30%	48,869	36.25%	3,292	2.44%			33,767	25.05%	134,797
Decatur	2,368	64.79%	1,187	32.48%	99	2.71%	1	0.03%	1,181	32.31%	3,655
DeKalb	2,014	60.66%	1,243	37.44%	63	1.90%			771	23.22%	3,320
Dickson	3,645	56.55%	2,619	40.63%	182	2.82%			1,026	15.92%	6,446
Dyer	6,066	75.94%	1,600	20.03%	321	4.02%	1	0.01%	4,466	55.91%	7,988
Fayette	3,264	59.75%	2,067	37.84%	132	2.42%			1,197	21.91%	5,463
Fentress	2,154	75.50%	665	23.31%	34	1.19%			1,489	52.19%	2,853
Franklin	4,136	57.51%	2,896	40.27%	160	2.22%			1,240	17.24%	7,192
Gibson	9,900	71.05%	3,625	26.02%	408	2.93%	1	0.01%	6,275	45.03%	13,934
Giles	2,914	57.69%	1,875	37.12%	261	5.17%	1	0.02%	1,039	20.57%	5,051
Grainger	2,842	76.54%	828	22.30%	43	1.16%			2,014	54.24%	3,713
Greene	9,772	76.89%	2,764	21.75%	171	1.35%	2	0.02%	7,008	55.14%	12,709
Grundy	1,364	54.49%	1,005	40.15%	134	5.35%			359	14.34%	2,503
Hamblen	8,879	76.39%	2,563	22.05%	180	1.55%	2	0.02%	6,316	54.34%	11,624
Hamilton	58,469	70.62%	20,657	24.95%	3,668	4.43%			37,812	45.67%	82,794
Hancock	1,813	81.59%	393	17.69%	16	0.72%			1,420	63.90%	2,222
Hardeman	3,494	66.00%	1,550	29.28%	183	3.46%	67	1.27%	1,944	36.72%	5,294
Hardin	4,401	76.29%	1,202	20.84%	166	2.88%			3,199	55.45%	5,769
Hawkins	7,791	72.31%	2,608	24.20%	373	3.46%	3	0.03%	5,183	48.11%	10,775
Haywood	3,123	59.45%	1,966	37.43%	164	3.12%			1,157	22.02%	5,253
Henderson	5,122	77.64%	1,313	19.90%	162	2.46%			3,809	57.74%	6,597
Henry	4,613	60.61%	2,694	35.40%	302	3.97%	2	0.03%	1,919	25.21%	7,611
Hickman	1,943	56.06%	1,393	40.19%	130	3.75%			550	15.87%	3,466
Houston	800	46.38%	870	50.43%	55	3.19%			-70	-4.05%	1,725
Humphreys	2,263	52.17%	1,973	45.48%	102	2.35%			290	6.69%	4,338
Jackson	956	45.98%	1,085	52.19%	38	1.83%			-129	-6.21%	2,079
Jefferson	5,925	80.26%	1,357	18.38%	100	1.35%			4,568	61.88%	7,382
Johnson	3,362	87.08%	450	11.66%	49	1.27%			2,912	75.42%	3,861
Knox	64,747	71.56%	24,076	26.61%	1,661	1.84%			40,671	44.95%	90,484
Lake	1,147	65.69%	536	30.70%	62	3.55%	1	0.06%	611	34.99%	1,746
Lauderdale	3,597	64.40%	1,771	31.71%	217	3.89%			1,826	32.69%	5,585
Lawrence	6,438	67.90%	2,824	29.78%	219	2.31%	1	0.01%	3,614	38.12%	9,482
Lewis	1,056	46.98%	1,138	50.62%	54	2.40%			-82	-3.64%	2,248
Lincoln	3,266	61.84%	1,867	35.35%	148	2.80%			1,399	26.49%	5,281
Loudon	5,357	75.12%	1,604	22.49%	170	2.38%			3,753	52.63%	7,131
Macon	2,295	75.67%	653	21.53%	83	2.74%	2	0.07%	1,642	54.14%	3,033
Madison	15,481	72.31%	5,203	24.30%	666	3.11%	59	0.28%	10,278	48.01%	21,409
Marion	3,711	63.56%	1,929	33.04%	199	3.41%			1,782	30.52%	5,839
Marshall	2,593	59.23%	1,526	34.86%	256	5.85%	3	0.07%	1,067	24.37%	4,378
Maury	7,371	66.28%	3,262	29.33%	483	4.34%	5	0.04%	4,109	36.95%	11,121
McMinn	7,423	70.56%	2,838	26.98%	259	2.46%			4,585	43.58%	10,520
McNairy	4,774	73.23%	1,610	24.70%	135	2.07%			3,164	48.53%	6,519
Meigs	1,052	64.34%	539	32.97%	44	2.69%			513	31.37%	1,635
Monroe	5,657	65.52%	2,870	33.24%	97	1.12%	10	0.12%	2,787	32.28%	8,634
Montgomery	7,839	56.40%	5,691	40.95%	363	2.61%	6	0.04%	2,148	15.45%	13,899
Moore	608	61.04%	356	35.74%	32	3.21%			252	25.30%	996
Morgan	2,531	69.59%	1,084	29.80%	22	0.60%			1,447	39.79%	3,637
Obion	5,800	70.36%	2,243	27.21%	200	2.43%			3,557	43.15%	8,243
Overton	1,947	54.17%	1,573	43.77%	74	2.06%			374	10.40%	3,594
Perry	900	48.10%	937	50.08%	34	1.82%			-37	-1.98%	1,871
Pickett	957	72.23%	357	26.94%	11	0.83%			600	45.29%	1,325
Polk	2,285	60.58%	1,431	37.94%	56	1.48%			854	22.64%	3,772
Putnam	6,038	60.39%	3,738	37.38%	223	2.23%			2,300	23.01%	9,999
Rhea	3,842	72.50%	1,312	24.76%	145	2.74%			2,530	47.74%	5,299
Roane	8,742	70.10%	3,433	27.53%	295	2.37%			5,309	42.57%	12,470
Robertson	4,175	56.43%	2,985	40.34%	239	3.23%			1,190	16.09%	7,399
Rutherford	11,256	64.12%	5,811	33.10%	486	2.77%	1	0.01%	5,445	31.02%	17,554
Scott	2,775	79.24%	679	19.39%	45	1.28%	3	0.09%	2,096	59.85%	3,502
Sequatchie	1,298	64.58%	629	31.29%	83	4.13%			669	33.29%	2,010
Sevier	8,273	86.38%	1,128	11.78%	177	1.85%			7,145	74.60%	9,578
Shelby	161,922	65.32%	81,089	32.71%	4,816	1.94%	55	0.02%	80,833	32.61%	247,882
Smith	1,812	56.84%	1,260	39.52%	116	3.64%			552	17.32%	3,188
Stewart	790	40.83%	1,098	56.74%	47	2.43%			-308	-15.91%	1,935
Sullivan	27,593	71.64%	10,007	25.98%	824	2.14%	93	0.24%	17,586	45.66%	38,517
Sumner	10,020	66.11%	4,596	30.32%	538	3.55%	3	0.02%	5,424	35.79%	15,157
Tipton	5,542	71.52%	1,853	23.91%	353	4.56%	1	0.01%	3,689	47.61%	7,749
Trousdale	663	53.90%	539	43.82%	28	2.28%			124	10.08%	1,230
Unicoi	3,877	81.35%	822	17.25%	67	1.41%			3,055	64.10%	4,766
Union	1,927	76.26%	570	22.56%	30	1.19%			1,357	53.70%	2,527
Van Buren	629	61.61%	364	35.65%	28	2.74%			265	25.96%	1,021
Warren	3,565	60.49%	2,118	35.93%	210	3.56%	1	0.02%	1,447	24.56%	5,894
Washington	17,343	74.79%	5,284	22.79%	556	2.40%	5	0.02%	12,059	52.00%	23,188
Wayne	2,898	79.79%	673	18.53%	61	1.68%			2,225	61.26%	3,632
Weakley	5,836	71.48%	2,027	24.83%	302	3.70%			3,809	46.65%	8,165
White	2,252	60.42%	1,392	37.35%	83	2.23%			860	23.07%	3,727
Williamson	7,556	71.53%	2,616	24.76%	392	3.71%			4,940	46.77%	10,564
Wilson	6,486	65.77%	3,096	31.40%	277	2.81%	2	0.02%	3,390	34.37%	9,861
Totals	813,147	67.70%	357,293	29.75%	30,373	2.53%	369	0.03%	455,854	37.95%	1,201,182

=== By congressional district ===
Nixon won all 8 congressional districts, including three held by Democrats.

District	Nixon	McGovern
1st	78.5%	21.5%
2nd	73.4%	26.6%
3rd	72.3%	27.7%
4th	65.0%	35.0%
5th	62.6%	37.4%
6th	72.5%	27.5%
7th	75.4%	24.6%
8th	57.4%	42.6%

== See also ==
- 1972 United States Senate election in Tennessee

== Works cited ==
- Black, Earl; Black, Merle (1992). The Vital South: How Presidents Are Elected. Harvard University Press. ISBN 0674941306.
- Moreland, Laurence; Steed, Robert; Baker, Tod, eds. (1991). The 1988 Presidential Election in the South: Continuity Amidst Change in Southern Party Politics. Praeger Publishers. ISBN 0275931455.
