= Tennessee Board of Parole =

The Tennessee Board of Parole, formerly known as the Tennessee Board of Pardons and Paroles and Tennessee Board of Probation and Parole, is the state parole board in Tennessee.

== Description ==
The Board of Parole is an independent state agency led by seven board members appointed by the Governor. The Board has authority under state statute to issue parole to offenders who have served a certain percentage of their sentences, as well as to revoke parole privileges for parolees who fail to follow the rules and standards established for them as conditions of release. The Board also receives and considers requests for executive clemency and makes recommendations to the Governor on the disposition of these requests.

Charles Traughber is chairman of the Board of Parole. Except for a two-year period from December 1985 to December 1987, he has served on the Board since 1972. He was its chairman from 1972 to 1976, from 1977 to 1979, and from 1988 to present.

== History ==
The agency was established in 1961 as a division of the Tennessee Department of Correction, headed by a three-member Board of Probation and Paroles that consisted of the Commissioner of Correction and two part-time board members. The board was expanded to five members in 1963; in 1970 the Commissioner of Correction ceased being a member.

In 1972, legislation enacted by the 86th Tennessee General Assembly created the Tennessee Board of Pardons and Paroles as a full-time board of three members. Members were to be appointed for six-year terms, with staggered terms of two, four, and six years for the initial appointments. Governor Winfield Dunn appointed Charles Traughber as the first chairman and Dorothy Greer and Joseph Mitchell as the other charter members.

In the 1970s, the Board of Pardons and Paroles had a central role in the cash-for-clemency scandal in the administration of Governor Ray Blanton. Marie Ragghianti, whom Blanton had appointed to chair the Board of Pardons and Paroles, was removed from her position as chairwoman in August 1977 after she refused a request to release certain prisoners who were later found to have bribed members of the Blanton administration to obtain their release. Ragghianti's story later gained national attention as the subject of Peter Maas' book Marie and the 1985 movie of the same name.

In July 2012, probation responsibilities were transferred from the Board to the Department of Correction. As a result of this change in its responsibilities, the Board of Probation and Parole was renamed the Board of Parole.
