= Marie Ragghianti =

American politician

Marie Fajardo Ragghianti (born June 13, 1942) is an American parole board administrator, famous as the whistleblower who exposed Tennessee Governor Ray Blanton's "clemency for cash" scandal in 1977-79.

Ragghianti grew up in Florida, where she was regarded as a beauty queen. She married a boxer, but her husband became an alcoholic. Their son nearly died from a lung infection at the age of two. They divorced, leaving Ragghianti with three young children.

In 1971, at the age of 29, Ragghianti won a scholarship to Vanderbilt University, and earned a Bachelor of Science in English Literature and Psychology (1975). She was active in the Vanderbilt Young Democrats Club and caught the attention of newly elected governor Blanton's legal counsel, T. Edward "Eddie" Sisk. She was an extradition officer for the Tennessee Department of Correction (1975–76) and the chair of the Tennessee Board of Pardons and Paroles (1976–77).

Ragghianti earned a M.S. in Management of Human Services in 1978 from Vanderbilt University, and a Master of Public Administration (M.P.A.) from the Harvard University John F. Kennedy School of Government in 1992. She worked as a consultant to the Tennessee legislature in 1979. From 1979 through 1997, she worked as a criminal justice consultant. From 1997 through 1999, she worked as the chief of staff for the United States Parole Commission.

Ragghianti was responsible for a federal investigation of corruption in the Tennessee parole and pardon process that led to the conviction of the governor and two aides, and was the subject of the 1985 movie Marie. Her attorney during the trial was Fred Thompson, who began his acting career portraying himself in the movie.

Ragghianti received the Goldsmith Award for journalism while attending the Kennedy School of Government and was a National Institute on Drug Abuse fellow while attending the graduate program in criminal justice at the University of Albany, SUNY.

She was appointed a member of the U.S. Parole Commission National Appeals Board on December 9, 1999, by President Bill Clinton in a recess appointment. She was designated as the board's vice chairperson on January 6, 2000. Her appointment expired December 15, 2000 after no action on her nomination had been taken by the United States Senate.
