= Mike Long (author) =

American author

- Born: Missouri
- Occupation: Writer
- Known for: Speechwriting, Film Reviews, Essays
- Website: http://www.mikelongonline.com

Michael Long is an American author. In 2008, he began teaching at Georgetown University in the graduate school of professional studies, with classes on writing and speechwriting.

== Biography ==
Long grew up in rural Missouri as the son of a preacher. He received a scholarship to go to Murray State University in Kentucky, where he studied physics. Mr. Long finished at the top of his class, and then went on to graduate study in physics at Vanderbilt University in Tennessee. After working in physics for almost a decade, he shifted to comedy writing and began writing and performing stand-up comedy. According to his LinkedIn profile, he currently lives in Burke, Virginia.

Long was a regular contributor to the Jewish World Review from 2001 to 2005. He completed his first novel, Killing, in 2001.

With psychiatrist Daniel Lieberman, he published, in 2018, The Molecule of More: How a Single Chemical in Your Brain Drives Love, Sex, and Creativity — And Will Determine the Fate of the Human Race.

A follow-up book, Taming the Molecule of More: A Step-by-Step Guide to Make Dopamine Work for You, written by Long alone, is set to be published in 2025.
