= Marie (1985 film) =

1985 film by Roger Donaldson

- Theatrical release poster
- Directed by: Roger Donaldson
- Screenplay by: John Briley
- Based on: Marie: A True Story by Peter Maas
- Produced by: Frank Capra Jr.
- Starring: Sissy Spacek; Jeff Daniels; Keith Szarabajka; Morgan Freeman; Fred Thompson
- Cinematography: Chris Menges
- Edited by: Neil Travis
- Music by: Francis Lai
- Production company: Metro-Goldwyn-Mayer
- Distributed by: MGM/UA Entertainment
- Release date: September 25, 1985
- Running time: 112 minutes
- Country: United States
- Language: English
- Budget: $12 million
- Box office: $14.2 million (worldwide rentals)

Marie (also known as Marie: A True Story) is a 1985 American biographical film starring Sissy Spacek as Marie Ragghianti, former head of the Tennessee Board of Pardons and Paroles, who was removed from office in 1977 after refusing to release prisoners on whose behalf bribes had been paid to aides to Governor Ray Blanton. Ragghianti, a single mother and political appointee, was hounded for refusal to cooperate with the culture of corruption with which she found herself confronted. Two of Blanton's aides, T. Edward Sisk and William Thompson, faced prosecution for their roles in the scandal. The film was based on the book Marie: A True Story by Peter Maas.

The film was directed by Roger Donaldson and written by John Briley. It also stars Jeff Daniels, Keith Szarabajka, Morgan Freeman, Fred Thompson, Lisa Banes, John Cullum, Graham Beckel and Macon McCalman.

== Plot ==
In the mid 1970s, Marie Ragghianti leaves an abusive marriage and moves back home with her mother Virginia Fajardo in Tennessee to eke out a better life for herself and her three young children; Marie waited tables while also completing the degree requirements at Vanderbilt to obtain a B.A. in English and Psychology. She is unapologetic in asking a college acquaintance, Eddie Sisk, for a job, when he is appointed legal counsel for the just-elected governor Ray Blanton. In what he considers a win-win situation, Eddie offers Marie a job as the Extradition Officer for the state, which she accepts.

From there, Marie quickly moves up the chain of command, first becoming the liaison to the Governor on Parole Board recommendations - the role which is meant to be a two way street, where there is an understood quid pro quo in recommendations from the Board to the Governor, and from the Governor back to the Board - then becoming the Parole Board Chief. While working in these jobs, Marie becomes more and more uncomfortable in her working relationship with Eddie, and the Governor, who seems to be increasingly wanting parole for inmates who have no grounds to be paroled, and even worse, wanting full pardons for inmates who have no grounds to be pardoned.

As Marie becomes more and more vocally opposed to what the Governor and Eddie want, she will learn how far they will go to silence and/or discredit her. In return, the Governor and Eddie will learn that Marie will not take what is happening to her sitting down, especially as she believes she has done nothing wrong in carrying out the responsibilities of any of her state duties.

== Cast ==
- Sissy Spacek as Marie Ragghianti
- Jeff Daniels as Eddie Sisk
- Keith Szarabajka as Kevin McCormack
- Morgan Freeman as Charles Traughber
- Fred Thompson as Himself
- Lisa Banes as Toni Greer
- Trey Wilson as FBI Agent
- John Cullum as Deputy Attorney General
- Don Hood as Governor Ray Blanton
- Graham Beckel as Charlie Benson
- Macon McCalman as Murray Henderson
- Collin Wilcox Paxton as Virginia Fajardo
- Vincent Irizarry as Dave Ragghianti
- Michael P. Moran as Bill Thompson
- Clarence Felder as Jack Lowery
- Joe Sun as Tommy Pratter
- Lisa Foster as Sherry Lomax
- Leon Rippy as Gary Gerbitz
- Timothy Carhart as Clayton Dawson
- Ruby Wilson as Rose Lee Cooper
- Stephen McKinley Henderson as Mr. Cooper
- Jane Powell as Singer

== Critical reception ==
Most reviewers praised Sissy Spacek's performance. Janet Maslin, writing in The New York Times, said Spacek "...evolves effortlessly from a battered young wife to a self-possessed official, and gives yet another guileless, radiant performance of unusual immediacy." Several reviewers praised the performance of Fred Thompson, who was known primarily as a peripheral figure in the United States Senate probe of the Watergate scandal. Thompson was Marie Ragghianti's attorney during the actual trial and played himself in the film.
