= Jerrold S. Petrofsky =

American academic

Jerrold S. Petrofsky was a professor of physical therapy at Loma Linda University in the School of Allied Health Professions.

He is best known for his development while at Wright State University in Dayton, Ohio, of a portable computer system which stimulated the leg muscles of paralysis victims allowing them control of their lower extremities. In November 1982 he rose to prominence when a student, Nan Davis, who had been paralyzed from the waist down for four years, was made able to walk using technology Petrofsky helped develop. Their story became the inspiration for the television movie First Steps.
