= Ray Blanton =

American politician (1930–1996)

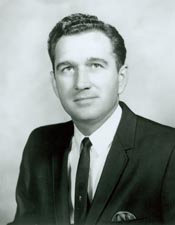

44th Governor of Tennessee
- In office January 18, 1975 – January 17, 1979
- Lieutenant: John S. Wilder
- Preceded by: Winfield Dunn
- Succeeded by: Lamar Alexander

Member of the U.S. House of Representatives from Tennessee's 7th district
- In office January 3, 1967 – January 3, 1973
- Preceded by: Tom J. Murray
- Succeeded by: Robin Beard (Redistricting)

Member of the Tennessee House of Representatives from the 26th Floterial district
- In office 1965–1967
- Preceded by: William Berry
- Succeeded by: Buford Reed

Personal details
- Born: Leonard Ray Blanton; April 10, 1930 Hardin County, Tennessee, U.S.
- Died: November 22, 1996 (aged 66) Jackson, Tennessee, U.S.
- Party: Democratic
- Spouses: Betty Littlefield (m. 1949; div. 1979) Karen Flint (m. 1988)
- Education: University of Tennessee (BS)

Leonard Ray Blanton (April 10, 1930 – November 22, 1996) was an American businessman and politician who served as the 44th governor of Tennessee from 1975 to 1979. He also served three terms in the U.S. House of Representatives, from 1967 to 1973. Though he initiated a number of government reforms and was instrumental in bringing foreign investment to Tennessee, his term as governor was marred by scandal over the selling of pardons and liquor licenses.

To date, Blanton is the last governor of Tennessee to serve only a single term in office. He was succeeded by Lamar Alexander.

== Early life and Congress ==
Blanton was born near Adamsville, Tennessee, in the community of New Hope, the son of Leonard and Ova (Delaney) Blanton. He was raised in an impoverished sharecropping family with road-building interests. While working with his family's road company, he occasionally got into fights at bars in Tennessee and Mississippi, and was once grazed in the neck by a stray bullet. Blanton graduated from Shiloh High School in 1948, and obtained a bachelor's degree in agriculture from the University of Tennessee in 1951. He taught school in Mooresville, Indiana, from 1951 to 1953, when he returned to Adamsville to work in the family construction business, B&B Construction.

In 1964, Blanton was elected to the Tennessee House of Representatives, representing McNairy County. He often sat in the back of the House chamber wearing sunglasses during House proceedings.

In 1966, Blanton ran for Congress, challenging 12-term incumbent and former Crump machine ally Tom J. Murray in the Democratic primary for Tennessee's 7th congressional district, which was based in Jackson and included Adamsville. In a major upset, Blanton edged Murray for the nomination, winning by just 384 votes out of the nearly 70,000 votes cast. He went on to win the general election, and was twice reelected.

As a congressman, Blanton had relatively poor attendance, sponsored few bills of significance, and served on just two committees: the Interstate and Foreign Commerce Committee, and the District of Columbia committee. He instead focused on his constituents, namely by trying to acquire funding for projects in Tennessee, including the state's first Head Start Program. He spent a great deal of time at his district office responding to voter concerns, and frequently spoke to groups of students. Blanton criticized the anti-war movement, voted against extending the Voting Rights Act, and opposed lowering the voting age to 18.

Tennessee lost a congressional district after the 1970 census, and the legislature merged most of Blanton's territory with the neighboring 8th District of popular fellow Democrat, Ed Jones. The merged district retained Blanton's district number, but was geographically more Jones' district. Rather than run against Jones in 1972, Blanton decided to run for the U.S. Senate. He easily won the Democratic primary, and faced the Republican incumbent, Howard Baker, in the general election. Unlike Blanton, Baker had supported the Voting Rights Act and the lowering of the voting age, helping him make inroads among two key constituencies, black voters and young voters. Baker also tied Blanton to the more liberal Democratic presidential candidate, George McGovern. On election day, Baker won in a landslide, 716,534 votes (62%) to 440,599 (38%).

== Governor of Tennessee ==
In 1974, Blanton won a twelve-person Democratic primary for governor. With just 23% of the vote, he defeated several well-financed opponents, including flamboyant East Tennessee banker Jake Butcher, Nashville news anchor Hudley Crockett, and former Senator Ross Bass. His opponent in the general election was Lamar Alexander, who had been a campaign manager for the incumbent, Winfield Dunn (the state constitution at the time prevented governors from serving two consecutive terms, so Dunn could not run). Though Dunn and Republicans had broken the Democrats' dominance of state politics in 1970, the Republican Party was tarnished by the Watergate scandal. On election day, Blanton defeated Alexander, by 121,366 votes.

Following his inauguration, Blanton called for a state income tax, but the state legislature, fearing a revolt from voters, refused to consider it, and instead raised the state sales tax. Blanton overhauled the state's excise and franchise tax laws, and revised the state's Hall income tax to provide relief for the state's elderly residents. He also elevated the state's Office of Tourism to a cabinet-level department, making Tennessee the first state in the nation to do so, and upgraded the state's retirement system.

Blanton's administration was noted for extensive recruiting of foreign industrial and trade opportunities. He made several trips to Africa, the Middle East, Japan, and Europe, in an effort to form economic partnerships with foreign investors. He was criticized for the costs of these trips, but was instrumental in bringing British, West German, and Japanese investment to the state. In 1976, he hosted a meeting with several United Nations representatives in Nashville.

In February 1978, the state constitution was amended to allow Blanton and future Tennessee governors to succeed themselves. Blanton did not run for reelection. His Republican opponent in 1974, Lamar Alexander, won in November.

== Scandals ==
Blanton's administration was frequently accused of extravagant spending. He accepted a controversial $20,000 pay raise, and often took friends on trips at state expense. He and his aides charged $21,000 to state accounts for bar tabs, limousine rentals, and personal phone calls, though they eventually paid the money back. Blanton was criticized for setting up a large network of county patronage officials, stating they were his political advisers.

His family's company was awarded a paving contract at a state park, even though Blanton had assured the company would not do business with the state during his governorship.

In 1977, the "surplus car scandal" erupted when state officials were accused of selling surplus state-owned cars to political allies. Charles Bell, Commissioner of General Services, resigned, and Sonny McCarter, director of the state's Surplus Property Division, pleaded guilty to two counts of embezzlement. Transportation Commissioner Eddie Shaw was indicted for his role in the scandal, but was acquitted.

=== Pardons and liquor licenses scandals ===
In 1977, Blanton fired Marie Ragghianti, chairwoman of the state's Board of Pardons and Paroles, when she refused to release prisoners who, as was later determined, had bribed state officials in exchange for obtaining pardons (Ragghianti later sued and won a $38,000 judgment against the state). On December 15, 1978, the FBI raided the state capitol, and seized documents from the office of Blanton's legal advisor, T. Edward Sisk. Sisk and two others were arrested, and Blanton appeared before a federal grand jury on December 23, where he denied any wrongdoing.

On January 15, 1979, near the end of his term, Blanton issued pardons to 52 state prisoners, including 20 convicted murderers. Among those pardoned was Roger Humphreys, the son of a Blanton supporter, who had been convicted of killing his ex-wife and a male companion in 1973. As Blanton signed Humphreys' pardon, he stated, "this takes guts." The Secretary of State, Gentry Crowell, who was disgusted with the pardons, replied, "some people have more guts than brains."

While Blanton stated the pardons were to comply with a court order to reduce the state's prison population, the FBI and members of both parties grew concerned that the pardons were related to the alleged scandal then under investigation. After U.S. Attorney Hal Hardin (a friend of Blanton) tipped off state leaders that Blanton was planning more pardons, Lieutenant Governor (and Senate Speaker) John S. Wilder and State House Speaker Ned McWherter searched for a way to prevent further damage to the state's reputation. They found it in the state constitution, which is somewhat vague on when a newly elected governor must be sworn in. It was eventually decided to swear in Lamar Alexander, who had won the 1978 gubernatorial election, three days before the traditional inauguration day. Wilder later referred to Blanton's ouster as "impeachment Tennessee-style".

Although never formally charged in the pardons matter, Blanton was eventually indicted on charges of mail fraud, conspiracy, and extortion for selling liquor licenses. He was convicted and sentenced to federal prison. Released on July 18, 1986, after serving 22 months, he returned to Tennessee. Although a panel of the Sixth Circuit Court of Appeals initially reversed the convictions because of the way in which the district court conducted the voir dire, that decision was vacated by the court's decision to re-hear the case en banc. The full Sixth Circuit Court affirmed Blanton's convictions, and the Supreme Court denied review. In January 1988, 9 of the 11 charges were thrown out in a separate appeal.

In June 2021, Tennessee officials linked the 1979 murder of Chattanooga businessman Samuel Pettyjohn, who was working with the FBI, to the Blanton administration.

== Later life ==
Blanton spent the last decade of his life trying unsuccessfully to clear his name. In 1988, he ran for the retiring Ed Jones' 8th district congressional seat. He finished far behind the eventual winner, John Tanner, winning just over 10% of the vote. He then became privately employed at a Ford dealership in Henderson.

Blanton died on November 22, 1996, at the Jackson-Madison County Hospital in Jackson while awaiting a liver transplant. He is buried in the churchyard of Shiloh Church, within Shiloh National Military Park (not to be confused with the Shiloh National Cemetery, also located within the park). His grave is marked by a large obelisk.

In 2012, the website RealClearPolitics named Blanton one of the ten most corrupt politicians of all time.

== Marie ==
A portion of the story of the pardons scandal was made into a book, Marie: A True Story, by Peter Maas, author of Serpico, and eventually made into the motion picture Marie (1985), starring Sissy Spacek in the title role of Marie Ragghianti. Attorney and future U.S. Senator Fred Thompson, who had served as Ragghianti's lawyer, launched his acting career in this picture, portraying himself. The pardons scandal, as well as others, are also detailed in the book FBI Codename TENNPAR, written by Hank Hillin, the Nashville-based FBI agent who led the investigation into the Blanton administration.

== Family ==
Blanton married Betty Littlefield in 1949. They had three children before they divorced in 1979. Blanton married Karen Flint in 1988, during his comeback bid for Congress.

== See also ==
- List of governors of Tennessee

U.S. House of Representatives
Preceded by Tom J. Murray	Member of the U.S. House of Representatives from Tennessee's 7th congressional district 1967–1973	Succeeded by Ed Jones
Party political offices
Preceded by Frank G. Clement	Democratic nominee for U.S. Senator from Tennessee (Class 2); 1972	Succeeded by Jane Eskind
Preceded by John Jay Hooker	Democratic Party nominee for Governor of Tennessee; 1974	Succeeded by Jake Butcher
Political offices
Preceded by Winfield Dunn	Governor of Tennessee; 1975–1979	Succeeded by Lamar Alexander
