= Riley Darnell =

American politician (1940–2020)

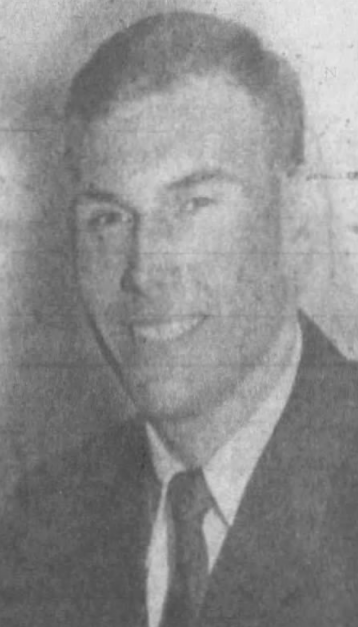
- Darnell in 1965

36th Tennessee Secretary of State
- In office 1993–2009
- Governor: Ned McWherter; Don Sundquist; Phil Bredesen
- Preceded by: Bryant Millsaps
- Succeeded by: Tre Hargett

Majority Leader of the Tennessee Senate
- In office 1989–1992
- Preceded by: Milton H. Hamilton Jr.
- Succeeded by: Carol Rice

Member of the Tennessee Senate from the 22nd district
- In office 1981–1993
- Preceded by: Halbert Harvill

Member of the Tennessee House of Representatives from the 67th district
- In office 1971–1981
- Preceded by: Frank J. Runyon

Personal details
- Born: Riley Carlisle Darnell; May 13, 1940 Clarksville, Tennessee, U.S.
- Died: October 2, 2020 (aged 80) Clarksville, Tennessee, U.S.
- Party: Democratic
- Spouse: Penny Crockarell
- Children: 5
- Education: Austin Peay State University (BS); Vanderbilt University Law School (JD)
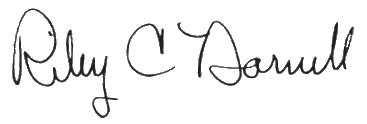
- Signature

Military service
- Allegiance: United States
- Branch/service: United States Air Force
- Years of service: 1966-1969

Riley Carlisle Darnell (May 13, 1940 – October 2, 2020) was an American politician and lawyer who served in the Tennessee House of Representatives from the 67th district, Tennessee Senate from the 22nd district, Majority Leader of the Tennessee Senate, and as Tennessee Secretary of State as a member of the Democratic Party.

Darnell was born in Clarksville, Tennessee, and educated at Clarksville High School, Austin Peay State University, and Vanderbilt University Law School. In 1970, he was elected to the Tennessee House of Representatives with the Democratic nomination, and during his tenure in the House of Representatives, he served on the Judicial, Finance, and Fiscal Review committees. In 1980, he was elected to the Tennessee Senate, and during his tenure in the Senate, he served on the Transportation, Ethics, Finance Ways and Means, Fiscal Review, and the Children and Youth committees.

Darnell unsuccessfully sought the position of Speaker of the Senate against incumbent John Shelton Wilder in 1986. In 1989, he was selected to serve as Majority Leader of the Tennessee Senate. He lost re-election in 1992 but defeated incumbent Secretary of State Bryant Millsaps and served in that position until 2009.

== Early life ==
Riley Carlisle Darnell was born on May 13, 1940, in Clarksville, Tennessee, to Elliot S. Darnell and Mary Anita Whitefield. Riley graduated from Clarksville High School in 1958, graduated with a Bachelor of Science degree from Austin Peay State University in 1962, and graduated with a juris doctor degree from Vanderbilt University Law School in 1965.

He was accepted into the Tennessee State Bar in 1965. From 1966 to 1969, he served in the United States Air Force. He married Penny Corckarell, with whom he had five children.

== Career ==
=== Tennessee House of Representatives ===
Riley announced in 1970 that he would seek the Democratic nomination for a seat in the Tennessee House of Representatives from the 67th district to succeed Frank J. Runyon. He won the Democratic nomination and faced no opposition in the general election. He was reelected in 1972, 1974, 1976, and 1978.

During the 1976 presidential election Riley supported and served as a delegate to the Democratic National Convention for Jimmy Carter from the 6th congressional district during the Democratic presidential primaries.

Riley was appointed to serve on the Judicial and Finance committees in the Tennessee House of Representatives in 1971. In 1975, Riley was selected over state Senator Doug Henry to succeed Representative John Hicks as chairman of the Fiscal Review committee.

=== Tennessee Senate ===
Riley announced in 1980 that he would seek the Democratic nomination for a seat in the Tennessee Senate from the 22nd district to succeed Halbert Harvill. He won the Democratic nomination against Perkins Freeman and Max Nichols and won in the general election against Republican nominee Alton Boyd. He was reelected in 1984, and 1988, but lost reelection to Carol Rice in 1992.

During the 1984 presidential election Riley supported and served on Walter Mondale's Tennessee steering committee during the Democratic presidential primaries.

Riley was appointed to serve on the Finance Ways and Means committee, as vice-chairman of the Transportation committee, and as chairman of the Ethics committee in the Tennessee Senate in 1981. In 1983, he was appointed to serve as a member of the Finance Ways and Means committee, vice-chairman of the Fiscal Review committee, and as chairman of the Transportation committee. He was selected to serve as chairman of the Select Committee on Children and Youth in 1987. From 1989 to 1992, he served as the Majority Leader of the Tennessee Senate.

On November 9, 1986, fifteen of the twenty-three Democrats in the Tennessee Senate voted to support Riley for the position of Speaker of the Senate, which informally served as the Lieutenant Governor of Tennessee, against incumbent John Shelton Wilder. However, Wilder defeated Riley with eighteen votes, with his support coming from eight Democrats and ten Republicans, against Riley's fifteen votes. Wilder later appointed Joe Nip McKnight to replace Darnell as chairman of the Transportation committee.

=== Tennessee Secretary of State ===
On November 9, 1992, Darnell announced that he would seek the office of Tennessee Secretary of State against incumbent Bryant Millsaps after he had lost reelection to the Tennessee Senate. Darnell won the Democratic nomination against Millsaps on November 19, and was elected as Secretary of State on Tennessee General Assembly on January 13, 1993. Darnell was reelected in 1997, 2001, and 2005. He lost reelected to Republican nominee Tre Hargett in 2009.

== Death ==
Riley died from cancer in Clarksville, Tennessee, on October 2, 2020, and was buried in Greenwood Cemetery.

== Electoral history ==
1978 Tennessee House of Representatives 67th district Democratic primary
Party	Candidate	Votes	%
Democratic	Riley Darnell (incumbent)	3,387	100.00%
Total votes		3,387	100.00%

1980 Tennessee Senate 22nd district election
Primary election
Party	Candidate	Votes	%
Democratic	Riley Darnell	773	51.09%
Democratic	Perkins Freeman	581	38.40%
Democratic	Max Nichols	159	10.51%
Total votes		1,513	100.00%
General election
Democratic	Riley Darnell	19,572	61.24%
Republican	Alton Boyd	12,386	38.76%
Total votes		31,958	100.00%

1992 Tennessee Secretary of State Democratic primary
Party	Candidate	Votes	%
Democratic	Riley Darnell	49	61.73%
Democratic	Bryant Millsaps (incumbent)	32	38.27%
Total votes		81	100.00%

2009 Tennessee Secretary of State election
Party	Candidate	Votes	%
Republican	Tre Hargett	70	53.44%
Democratic	Riley Darnell (incumbent)	61	46.56%
Total votes		131	100.00%

Political offices
Preceded by Bryant Millsaps	Secretary of State of Tennessee; 1993–2009	Succeeded by Tre Hargett
