= Hargett =

Hargett is a surname. Notable people with the surname include:

- Cecil Hargett, American politician
- Edd Hargett (born 1947), American football player
- Gus L. Hargett Jr., former Adjutant General of Tennessee
- Peter L. Hargett (1852–1927), American politician and businessman
- Tre Hargett (born 1969), American politician

== See also ==
- Harnett, surname
