= Rocky Top (disambiguation) =

"Rocky Top" is a song written by Felice and Boudleaux Bryant in 1967. It may also refer to:

- Rocky Top (Georgia), a summit
- Rocky Top, Tennessee, a town formerly named Lake City, Tennessee that in June 2014 changed its name to "Rocky Top"
- Operation Rocky Top, the FBI's code name for a public corruption investigation into the Tennessee state government in the late 1980s
