= Jerry W. Cooper =

American politician (1948–2020)

Jerry Wayne Cooper (born August 6, 1948, died March 21, 2020, in McMinnville) was an American Democratic politician and a former member of the Tennessee Senate for the 14th district, which encompasses Franklin, Bledsoe, Coffee, Grundy, Sequatchie, Van Buren, and Warren counties. On August 22, 2006, Cooper was indicted by a federal grand jury on three felony counts: bank fraud, mail fraud, and conspiracy to commit bank and mail fraud. He was acquitted of those charges, but in November 2007 he was fined $120,000 by the Tennessee Registry of Election Finance for state election finance violations and on December 7, 2007, he resigned his State Senate seat.

== Education and career ==
Jerry Cooper attended public schools in McMinnville and graduated with a Bachelor of Science degree in Engineering from the University of Tennessee at Knoxville in 1970. From 1970 to 1976, he served in the Tennessee Army National Guard. He is the founder of Cooper Manufacturing Company, a company in Smartt Station, Warren County that produces furniture and hardwood products.

He is Vice-President of the Tennessee Jaycees Foundation and has been the President of the Tennessee Jaycees from 1980 to 1981. In 1983, he was the Vice-President of the Tennessee Jaycees Foundation Camp for the Handicapped. Ten years later, the organization would later go on to found "Camp Discovery," which offers summer camp for children with serious skin conditions. In 1983, he also became the youngest ever to be named to the Board of Directors of City Bank & Trust.

== Political career ==
Jerry W. Cooper first served as a state senator in the 94th General Assembly. Before his resignation he was chairman of the Commerce, Labor, and Agriculture Committee, a member of the Senate Environment, Conservation, and Tourism Committee, and a member of the Senate Transportation Committee, the Joint Business Tax Committee, the Joint Lottery Scholarship Committee, the Lottery Oversight Committee, and the Joint Pensions and Insurance Committee.

When surveyed by The Tennessean, Cooper said that he thinks the state constitution should be changed so that it would specify that abortions are not guaranteed, but that abortion should be permitted by the constitution when incest, rape, or the mother's life are involved. He also does not support civil unions and domestic partnerships being legal in Tennessee. According to Project Vote Smart, he has voted to raise cigarette taxes and for allowing handguns to be carried in state parks.

== Controversies ==
=== Indictment for fraud ===
In April 2006, Cooper was accused by a federal prosecutor of asking then-Lt. Gov. John S. Wilder and Bill Baxter, who had been the Tennessee commissioner for economic development, for help getting a $1.7 million bank loan and an equipment loan for over $400,000 for the buyers of his lumber mill. In the case, James B. Passons was indicted for allegedly writing an appraisal that overestimated the value of Cooper's lumber mill, though neither Wilder, Baxter, nor Cooper were charged at that time.

Cooper had sought a $292,255 state grant for a rail spur leading to the lumber mill, and the appraisal Passons had written included a rail spur that had not been there. Cooper had allegedly assured Passons that the appraisal would not be used until the rail spur is there and that the rail spur "will be there." Earlier, Cooper had been cleared in an ethics probe by senators Joe M. Haynes and Steve Southerland, saying a state senator getting state approved money to improve property violated no ethics rules.

On August 22, 2006, Cooper was indicted by a federal grand jury sitting in Chattanooga, Tennessee, on three felony counts: bank fraud, mail fraud, and conspiracy to commit bank and mail fraud. No trial date has been set. Cooper could face up to 65 years in prison and up to $2 million in fines if convicted on all counts. It is alleged by federal prosecutors that Cooper tried to defraud Bank Tennessee, where John S. Wilder was a member of the Board of Directors, and that he approached "a political friend of his who was an influential person and a director of BankTennessee." He was acquitted in June 2007.

=== Driving under the influence ===
In February 2007, the Tennessee Department of Safety obtained a warrant in Rutherford County, charging Cooper with driving under the influence (DUI) and speeding. The charges resulted from an investigation into an early February 2007 automobile crash which involved Senator Cooper on Interstate 24 during Cooper's journey home after a night when he attended three legislative receptions at which alcoholic beverages were served. It was later revealed that Cooper's blood alcohol concentration was over two times the legal limit at 0.18.

=== Campaign funds ===
The state Registry of Election Finance wanted Jerry Cooper to appear at its November 2007 meeting to address a complaint filed by the Tennessee Center for Policy Research, which alleged he had transferred nearly $100,000 in campaign funds to a personal account. Cooper was found guilty of using campaign funds for his personal use and fined $120,000. On December 7, 2007, he resigned his State Senate seat.
