= Union University =

Christian university in Jackson, Tennessee, US

- Former name: List: Jackson Male Academy (1823–1844); West Tennessee College (1844–1874); Hall-Moody Junior College (1900–1927); Union University (1848–1859, 1868–1873); Southwestern Baptist University (1875–1907)
- Motto: Religio et Eruditio
- Type: Private university
- Established: 1823; 203 years ago
- Religious affiliation: Tennessee Baptist Convention (Southern Baptist Convention)
- Endowment: $55.2 million (2024)
- Head: Samuel W. Oliver
- Faculty: 201 full-time
- Students: 2,731
- Location: Jackson, Hendersonville, and Germantown, Tennessee, U.S. 35.6830°N 88.8565°W
- Campus: Urban, 290 acres (120 ha)
- Colors: Cardinal & cream
- Nickname: Bulldogs
- Sporting affiliations: NCAA Division II – Gulf South
- Website: uu.edu

Union University is a private Baptist university in Jackson, Tennessee, with additional campuses in Germantown and Hendersonville. The university is affiliated with the Tennessee Baptist Convention (Southern Baptist Convention). It was established in 1875 as "Southwestern Baptist University" on the campus of the former West Tennessee College. It absorbed the Hall-Moody Junior College of Martin, Tennessee.

== History ==
=== Predecessors ===
"Jackson Male Academy" was founded in Jackson, Tennessee, in 1823 as a preparatory school for wealthy students. The Tennessee General Assembly chartered the academy in 1825. In 1844, the academy reorganized and rechartered as "West Tennessee College". During the Civil War, the college was used as a military hospital by Confederate and Union troops. West Tennessee College reopened after the war. In 1874, the Tennessee Baptists acquired the college.

"Union University" was established at Murfreesboro, Tennessee, in 1849. It went inactive due to the Civil War in 1859 but operated again between 1868 and 1873.

=== Early history ===
The East Tennessee Baptist General Association, the General Association of Baptists in Middle Tennessee, and the West Tennessee Baptist Convention met in Humboldt, Tennessee, on March 15, 1873, adopting a resolution to establish a "first-class college". This resulted in an Educational Convention that met on April 10, 1874, in Murfreesboro, Tennessee, at the former campus of Union University. The convention explored potential locations for a new campus, eventually recommending Jackson. Their recommendation included taking over the endowment and campus of West Tennessee College.

The Tennessee General Assembly issued a charter for a new school, Southwestern Baptist University, in June 1875. Southwestern Baptist University opened in October 1875 in Jackson. It was a preparatory school the first year, adding college courses for its second year. Many of Southwestern's early faculty and trustees were alumni or former faculty of Union University.

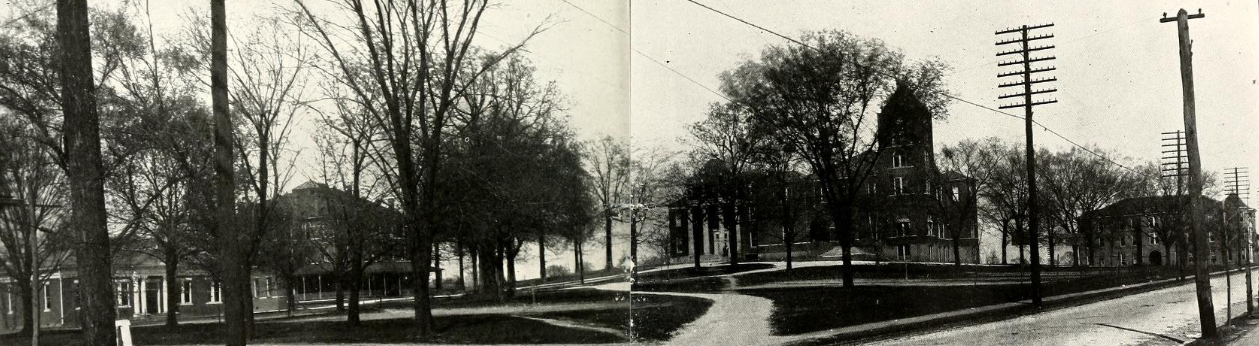
Southwestern Baptist University campus, 1906

In 1907, Southwestern trustee T. T. Eaton left his 6,000-volume library to the college. Eaton was a former professor of Union University, where his father, Joseph H. Eaton, was a former president. On September 17, 1907, Southwestern changed its name to Union University to honor the Eatons and others from Union at Murfreesboro who had affected Southwestern as faculty, administrators, trustees, and contributors.

In 1925, the Tennessee Baptist Convention secured a charter that vested the rights, authority, and property of Union University in the Tennessee Convention. This charter included the election of the university's trustees. Two years later, the Convention consolidated "Hall-Moody Junior College" at Martin (1900–1927) with Union University; the former Hall-Moody campus subsequently became the location of the University of Tennessee Junior College, now the University of Tennessee at Martin.

The Southern Association of Colleges and Schools granted Union University accreditation in 1948. From the early 1950s to the early 1970s, Union operated an Extension Center in the Memphis area.

=== Craig and Barefoot administrations ===
During President Robert Craig (1967–85) and President Hyran Barefoot's (1987–1996) administrations, enrollment increased to more than 2,000 and several buildings were constructed.

=== David S. Dockery's administration ===
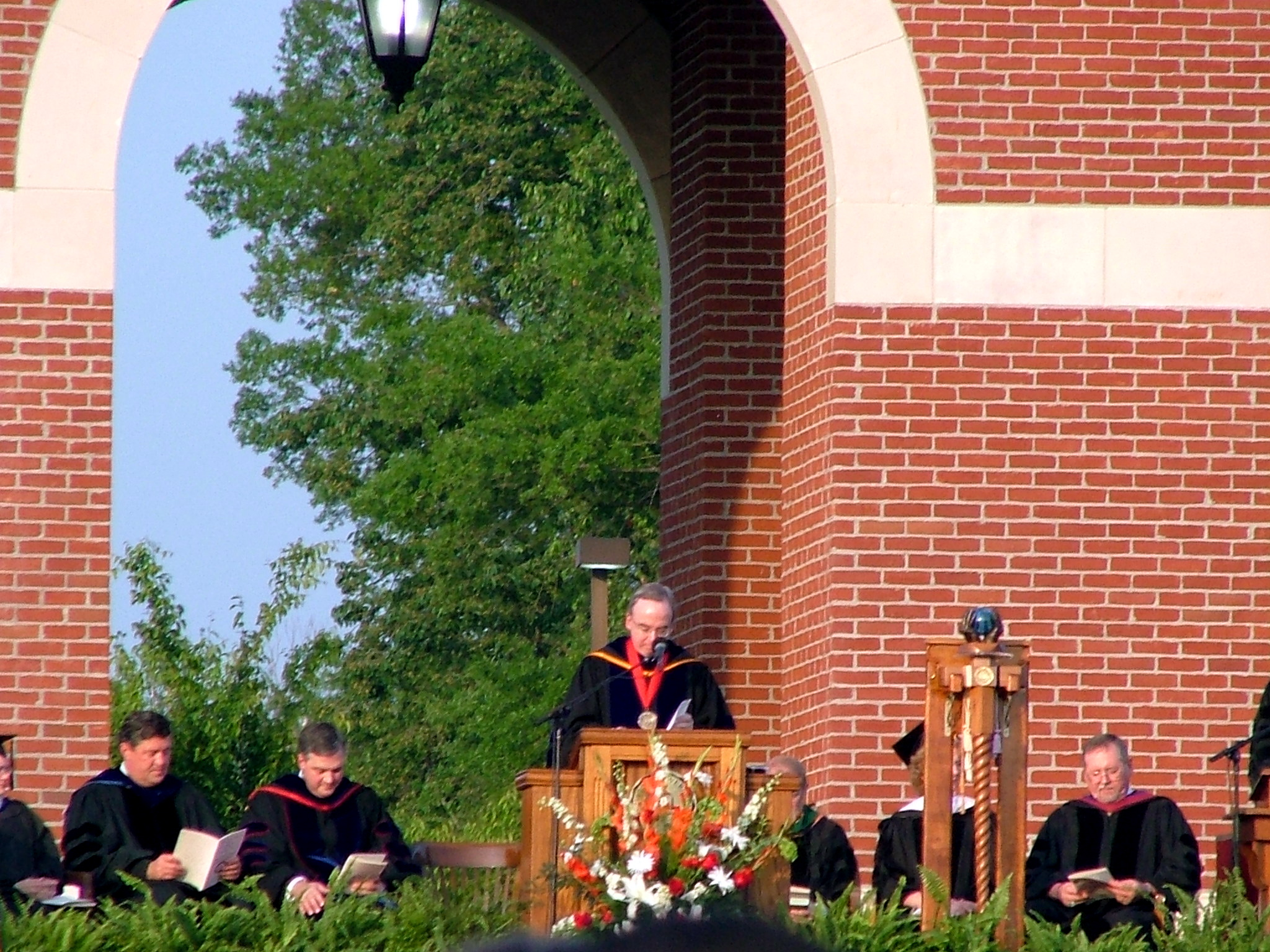
David Dockery at Union University

David S. Dockery was elected as the fifteenth president of Union University in December 1995. During his administration, which lasted until 2014, the university's enrollment increased and several buildings were constructed.

=== 2008 tornado ===
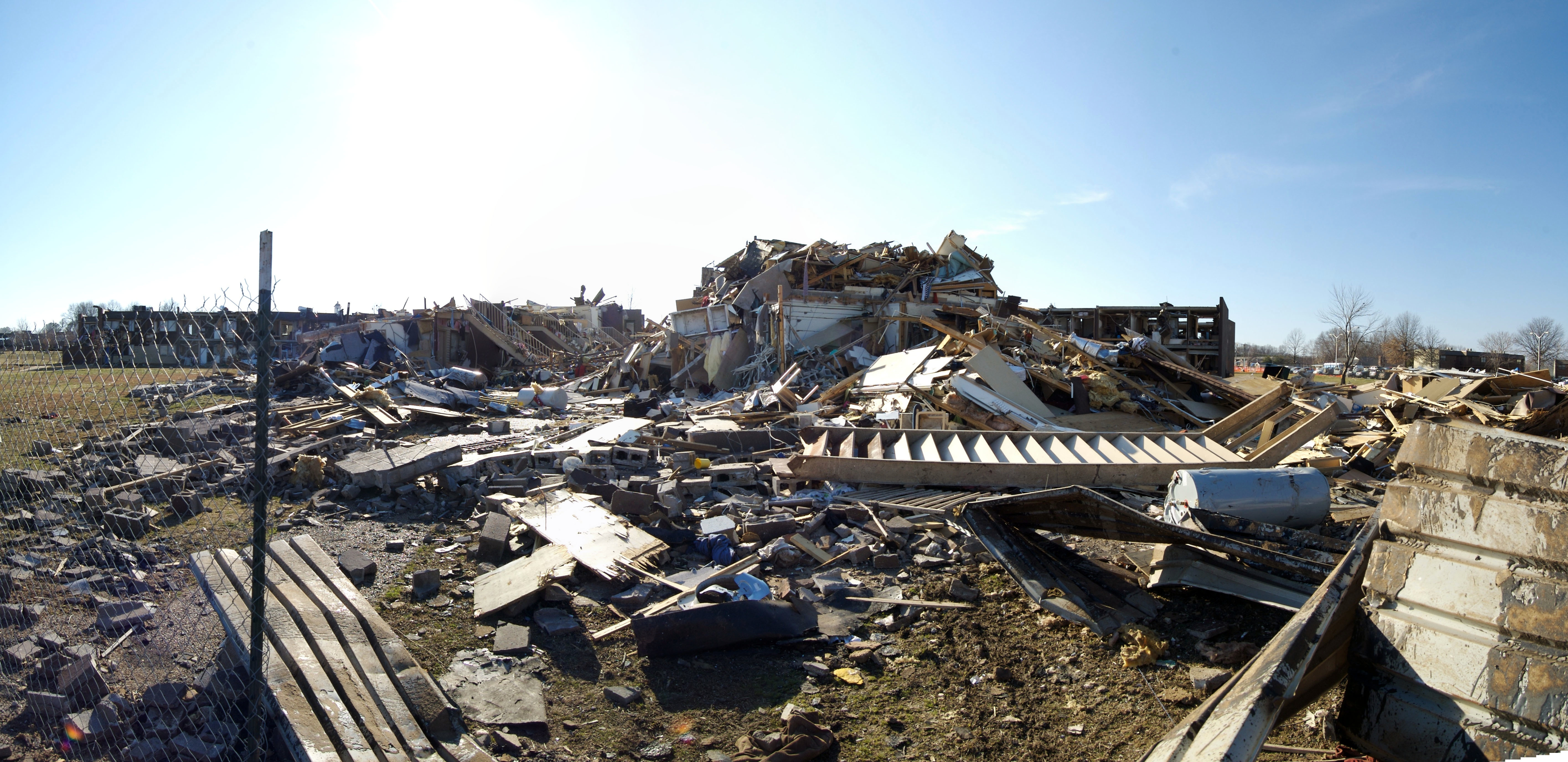
One of the Union dorms that was destroyed by the February 5, 2008 tornado.

Radar loop of the Nashville, Jackson and Christian County, Kentucky supercells. Those supercells were responsible for at least 32 deaths (courtesy of NWS Nashville)

On February 5, 2008, at 7:02 p.m., the university was struck by an EF4 tornado, with winds between 166 and 200 miles per hour (267 and 322 km/h). The tornado destroyed 18 dormitory buildings and caused over $40 million worth of damage to the campus, which suffered a direct hit, rendering almost 80% of the dormitory space either destroyed or unlivable. None of the approximately 1,800 students on campus at the time were killed.

Fifty-one students were taken to Jackson-Madison General Hospital. While most students were released after being treated, nine were kept overnight. Some students were trapped for hours while emergency crews worked to rescue them. A total of 31 buildings received damage of varying degrees. The devastation captured nationwide attention and was featured by CNN, Fox News, The New York Times and numerous regional news outlets. Secretary of Homeland Security Michael Chertoff, FEMA Director R. David Paulison and Governor of Tennessee Phil Bredesen all visited the campus after the disaster.

The Commercial Appeal reported that due to extensive damage, the campus would not reopen until February 18. Lambuth University, a rival area university, reportedly offered to open its dormitories to displaced Union students. The congregation of Englewood Baptist Church, which owned the Old English Inn in Jackson, voted unanimously to open the inn to Union students. The church's move accommodated almost 300 students until December 2008. The university also expected that around 200 students would be housed in the private homes of Union faculty, staff, and friends.

The February 5, 2008, event was the second time in just over five years that the campus was hit by a tornado. On the evening of November 10, 2002, during the Veterans Day Weekend tornado outbreak, the university was struck by an F1 tornado, with winds of approximately 100 miles per hour, which did approximately 2 million dollars' worth of damage to the university. There were no serious injuries. Union president David Dockery stated that the February 5, 2008 tornado was about 15 times as bad at the 2002 tornado. The damage caused by the February 5th tornado was estimated at $40 million.

== Academics, ethnic diversity, and acceptance rate ==
Union University is accredited by the Southern Association of Colleges and Schools (SACS). Its business program is also accredited by the Association to Advance Collegiate Schools of Business (AACSB).

As of 2025, total undergraduate enrollment is 1,891 students. In terms of ethnic diversity, 70% of the undergraduate student body is white. Tuition and fees are $39,850. The university has a 47% acceptance rate. The lowest average SAT score acceptable for admission is 1030.

== Campus ==
=== Jackson facilities ===
The campus is 290 acres (1.2 km^{2}) and includes a 2,200-seat gymnasium, dormitories for men and women including a married housing complex, separate lodges for the fraternities and sororities, academic halls, an administration center, baseball and softball parks, two soccer fields, and wellness center.

=== Germantown facilities ===
Union also has a 35-acre (140,000 m^{2}) campus in Germantown, Tennessee, (suburban Memphis) offering graduate degrees in business, education, Christian studies & nursing. The degrees in education include the M.Ed., M.A.Ed., Ed.S., and Ed.D.

=== Hendersonville facilities ===
Union's newest location is in Hendersonville, Tennessee, a suburb of Nashville. This campus offers graduate degrees in education and Christian studies.

== Athletics ==
The Union University athletic teams are called the Bulldogs. The university is a member of the NCAA Division II level, primarily competing in the Gulf South Conference (GSC) since the 2012–13 academic year. They were also a member of the National Christian College Athletic Association (NCCAA), primarily competing as an independent in the Mid-East Region of the Division I level. The Bulldogs previously competed in the defunct TranSouth Athletic Conference (TranSouth or TSAC) of the National Association of Intercollegiate Athletics (NAIA) from 1996–97 to 2011–12. Union began the three-year transition to full NCAA Division II membership in 2011.

Union University competes in eleven intercollegiate varsity sports. Men's sports include baseball, basketball, cross country, golf, and soccer; while women's sports include basketball, cross country, golf, soccer, softball, and volleyball. Former sports included cheerleading.

== Student life ==
=== Greek life ===
There are several social fraternities and sororities on campus.

=== LGBT students ===
Union University is an affiliate of the Southern Baptist Convention, and as such strictly follows a non-affirming interpretation of Christian scripture. This has led to controversies with regard to intolerance of LGBT students. The school has a code of conduct that prohibits among other things, homosexual behavior and advocacy, as well as premarital sex and alcohol. Former students have claimed that anti-gay policies are enforced more strictly and that heterosexual students received smaller fines for violations, while homosexual students were given the choice of conversion therapy or expulsion.

In 2008, Union denied access to the Soulforce Equality Ride, an effort to fight discrimination against gay people. Students were warned to have no contact with the group and one student who approached them was subsequently investigated. Soulforce participants were arrested for trespassing.

In 2015, Union withdrew from the Council of Christian Colleges and Universities after two council colleges changed their policies to allow hiring faculty members in same-sex marriages. Four members of the university faculty signed the 2017 Nashville Statement, an evangelical Christian statement of faith relating to human sexuality and gender roles that was perceived by some as expressing homophobia, transphobia, and misogyny.

In 2020, the school rescinded an admissions offer to a gay graduate-level nursing student, Alex Duron, after investigating his sexual orientation. Duron subsequently joined an unsuccessful lawsuit, Elizabeth Hunter, et al. v. U.S. Department of Education, seeking to end discrimination against LGBTQ+ students at publicly funded religious colleges and universities. Union University president Dub Oliver defended the school's actions by pointing to the college's religious exemption from the prohibitions on discrimination in Title IX, which it had applied for and received from the U.S. Department of Education, and to the college's statement of principles, which all students agree to follow.

=== Publications ===
- The Cardinal and Cream is the campus newspaper
- The Torch is the English Department's literary and arts publication

== Notable people ==
=== Alumni ===
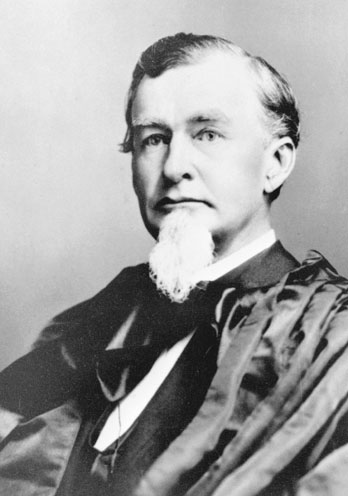
Howell Jackson

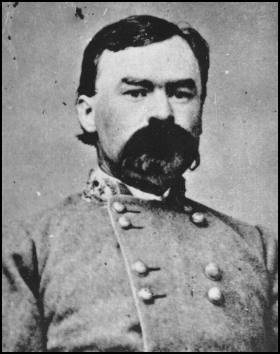
William Hicks Jackson

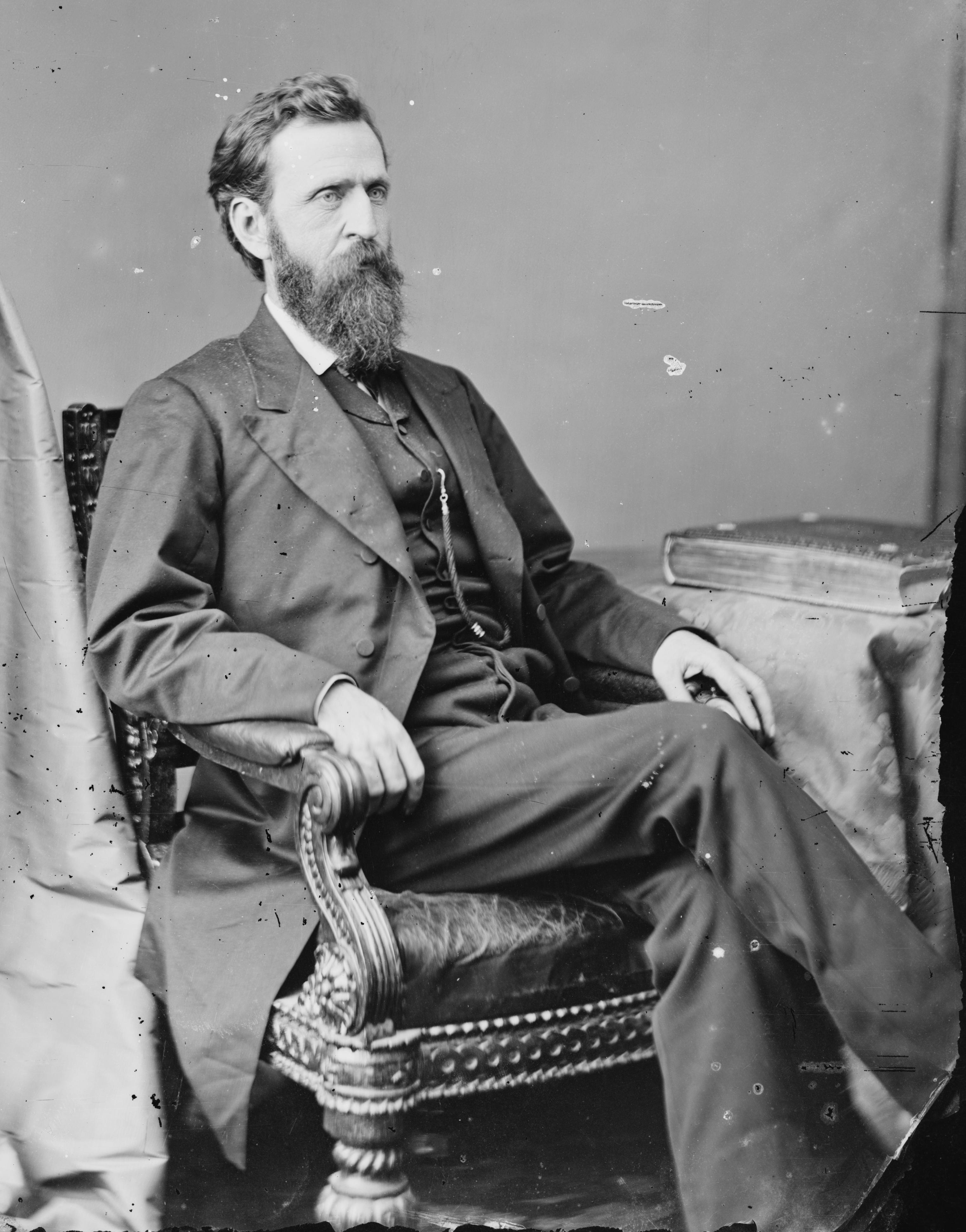
David Alexander Nunn

- Bob Agee - executive director for the International Association of Baptist Colleges and Universities and president emeritus of Oklahoma Baptist University.
- J. Mercer Burrell - New Jersey Legislature
- Jesse Chism - Tennessee House of Representatives
- Sargent Prentiss Freeling - attorney general of Oklahoma
- Steve Gaines - pastor
- H. Kirk Grantham - football, basketball and baseball player and coach.
- J. D. Grey (Bachelor's degree, 1929) - Southern Baptist pastor and convention president from 1952 to 1954
- George H. Guthrie – theologian
- Eli Shelby Hammond - federal judge
- John L. Head (attended) - basketball coach
- John W. Holland - federal judge
- Bill Hopper - Major League Baseball pitcher.
- Morton B. Howell - mayor of Nashville, Tennessee
- Howell Edmunds Jackson - United States Senate and United States Supreme Court Justice
- William Hicks Jackson - Confederate general, brother of Justice Howell Edmonds Jackson
- Jim Jones - football player
- Ben B. Lindsey - founder of the juvenile justice court system
- Mark Littell - baseball player
- W. M. Matthews - college football coach
- Chad McMahan - Mississippi state senator.
- Charles N. Millican - founding President for the University of Central Florida.
- Gaylon Moore - basketball player
- Jimmy Moore (baseball) - Major League baseball player
- Tom J. Murray (D) - U.S. Representative from Tennessee from 1943 to 1966
- George A. Neeley - U.S. Representative
- David Alexander Nunn - U.S. Representative and Tennessee Secretary of State
- Luis Ortiz - Major League baseball player
- Josephine Owino - basketball player
- Joseph B. Palmer - Confederate general and lawyer
- Herron C. Pearson (D) - U.S. Representative from Tennessee
- Albert Prago - historian
- Jeanette Brooks Priebe - Director of the Louisville Civil Service Board in Kentucky
- Kevin Ramos - baseball player
- Chris Rice - recording artist
- Eugene Rice - federal judge (Eastern District of Oklahoma)
- Haywood Yancey Riddle - United States House of Representatives
- Katrina Robinson - Tennessee Senate
- Gregory Segal - film producer
- R. R. Sneed - Tennessee Secretary of State
- L. Thomas Strong III - theologian
- Bull Sullivan - football coach
- John May Taylor (D) - U.S. Representative from Tennessee
- Andrew L. Todd Sr. - Tennessee House of Representatives and Tennessee State Senate
- Chris Todd - Tennessee House of Representatives
- William E. Troutt - president of Rhodes College
- Timothy Tucker - former president of the American Pharmacists Association
- John A. Tyson - judge of the United States Tax Court
- Kris Ward - soccer coach
- Dwaun Warmack - president of Claflin University and Harris–Stowe State University,
- Mark Weidemaier - baseball coach

=== Faculty and administration ===
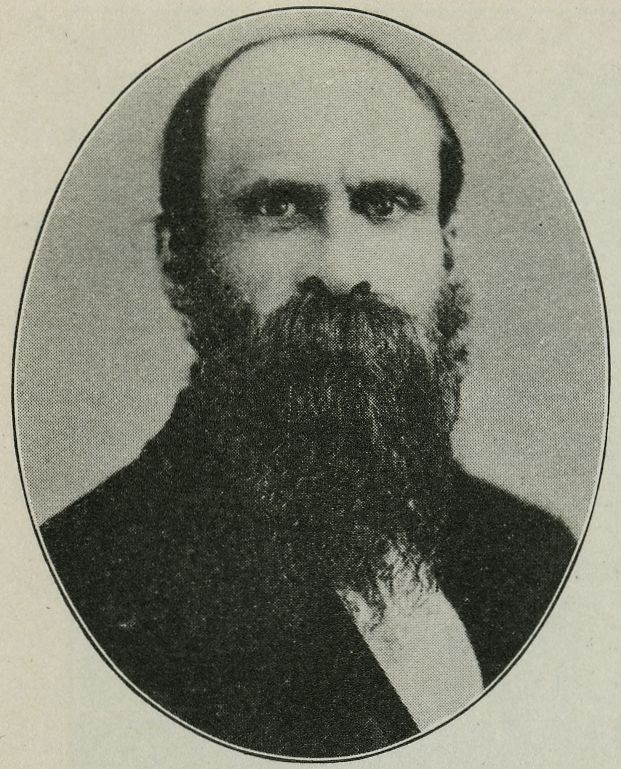
Benjamin Lee Arnold Union University professor, later president of Oregon State University

- Benjamin Lee Arnold - later became president of Oregon State University
- Milton Brown (W) - U.S. Representative and co-founder of Southwestern University (now Union University) and Lambuth University
- Ed Bryant (R) - Tennessee politician
- Charles Bell Burke - vice president and professor of English, later head of University of Tennessee Department of English
- Stephen Carls - chair of the History Department and expert on 20th-Century France, World War I, Europe between the two world wars, and French arms manufacturer Louis Loucheur.
- David Dockery - Chancellor of Trinity International University and president of Union University
- James Robinson Graves - chair of the Board of Trustees, 1885–1892; minister, journalist, author, and co-founder of Landmark Baptism
- David P. Gushee - ethicist, author of Kingdom Ethics
- George H. Guthrie - Professor at Regent College and Benjamin W. Perry Professor of Bible and chair of the School of Christian Studies, Union University
- Joe Guyon - head football coach
- Howell E. Jackson - law professor and Associate Justice of the Supreme Court of the United States
- Harry Lee Poe - Charles Colson Chair of Faith and Culture
- Haywood Yancey Riddle - United States House of Representatives
- Ivy Scarborough - author and lawyer
- Roy Stewart - head football coach
- C. Pat Taylor - president of Southwest Baptist University.

== See also ==
- List of colleges and universities in Tennessee
