= James H. Cummings =

American politician

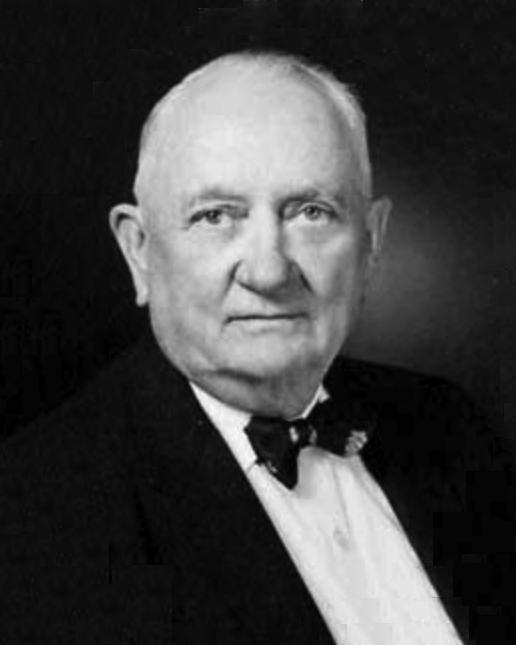
- Official portrait, 1965

74th Speaker of the Tennessee House of Representatives
- In office January 3, 1967 – January 7, 1969
- Preceded by: Dick Barry
- Succeeded by: Bill Jenkins

31st Secretary of State of Tennessee
- In office 1949–1953
- Governor: Gordon Browning
- Preceded by: Joe C. Carr
- Succeeded by: George Edward Friar
Additional positions
Member of the Tennessee House of Representatives
In office January 5, 1959 – January 2, 1973
Preceded by	Raymond C. Duke
Succeeded by	Frank Buck
Constituency	Cannon County (1959–63); 14th district (1963–65); 18th district (1965–73)
In office January 3, 1955 – January 7, 1957
Preceded by	Hoyt Bryson
Succeeded by	Raymond C. Duke
Constituency	Cannon County
In office January 2, 1939 – January 6, 1947
Preceded by	L. E. Willard
Succeeded by	Hoyt Bryson
Constituency	Cannon County
In office January 5, 1931 – January 4, 1937
Preceded by	O. E. Simpson
Succeeded by	L. E. Willard
Constituency	Cannon County
Member of the Tennessee Senate from the 12th district
In office January 7, 1957 – January 5, 1959
Preceded by	McAllen Foutch
Succeeded by	Barton Dement
In office January 6, 1947 – January 3, 1949
Preceded by	James E. Evins
Succeeded by	Shelton H. Edwards
In office January 4, 1937 – January 2, 1939
Preceded by	James E. Evins
Succeeded by	Knox T. Hutchinson
In office January 7, 1929 – January 5, 1931
Preceded by	Albert D. McKnight
Succeeded by	Charles C. Jackson

Personal details
- Born: James Harvey Cummings; November 8, 1890 Woodbury, Tennessee
- Died: November 1, 1979 (aged 88) Woodbury, Tennessee
- Party: Democratic
- Spouse: Hesta McBroom
- Relations: Carolyn C. Perrucci (niece)
- Education: Cumberland University (LL.B.)

James Harvey Cummings (November 8, 1890 – November 1, 1979) was a Tennessee farmer, attorney and political figure.

== Biography ==
Cummings was born on November 8, 1890, in Woodbury, Cannon County, Tennessee, USA, east-southeast of Nashville. Other than during the course of his higher education, he was a resident of that county throughout his life. Cummings attended the Woodbury Academy in his hometown and then enrolled at the Chattanooga Business College in 1909. He became the owner and operator of several farms. From 1919 to 1922, Cummings studied at the Nashville YMCA Night Law School. Admitted to the bar in 1922, he completed an LL.B. degree at Cumberland University in 1923.

Cummings was first elected to represent Cannon County in the Tennessee Senate in 1928. He was then elected to three consecutive two-year terms in the Tennessee House of Representatives, followed by an additional term in the Tennessee Senate. Cummings did not run for reelection in 1938, instead managing the unsuccessful gubernatorial primary campaign of Gordon Browning. Reelected to the Tennessee General Assembly in 1940, he served three more terms in the House followed by one more two-year term in the Senate.

Cummings was then elected Tennessee Secretary of State by his fellow legislators, serving from 1949 to 1953. After that, he returned to the legislature and served eight more consecutive terms, including one more in the Senate from 1957 to 1959, prior to his retirement in 1972. During this time, he became known as the "Dean of the Legislature" and also "The Last of the $4 a Day Men", in reference to his service at a time when Tennessee state legislators were allowed no salary at all and were paid only $4/day in expense money.

Cummings served as a delegate to the Democratic National Convention every four years from 1932 to 1968. His thirteen terms in the Tennessee House of Representatives and four in the Tennessee Senate surpassed the previous record of I. D. Beasley (1895–1955), who served seven terms in the House and five in the Senate. His service record was later surpassed by Douglas Henry (1926–2017).

Cummings was very popular among his constituents and seldom faced any organized efforts to defeat him for reelection, and was honored by his peers during the last day of the 1972 session prior to his retirement. Later, the portion of State Route 53 between the Cannon County seat of Woodbury and Interstate 24 was named the Jim Cummings Highway in his honor. He died on November 1, 1979, in Woodbury and is buried in the Cummings family cemetery three miles east of his hometown.

== Notes ==
Political offices
Preceded by Joe C. Carr	Secretary of State of Tennessee; 1949–1953	Succeeded by G. Edward Friar
