= Jared Maddux =

American politician

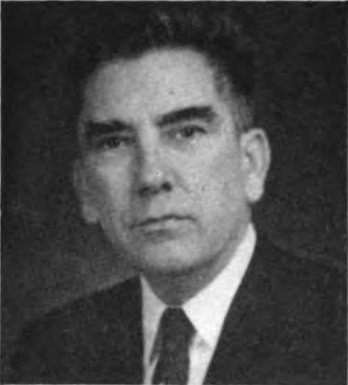

43rd and 46th Lieutenant Governor of Tennessee Speaker of the Tennessee Senate
- In office January 4, 1965 – January 3, 1967
- Governor: Frank G. Clement
- Preceded by: James L. Bomar Jr.
- Succeeded by: Frank Gorrell
- In office January 5, 1953 – January 5, 1959
- Governor: Frank G. Clement
- Preceded by: Walter M. Haynes
- Succeeded by: William D. Baird

Member of the Tennessee Senate
- In office January 7, 1963 – January 3, 1967
- Preceded by: Allen M. O'Brien
- Succeeded by: William D. Baird
- Constituency: 15th district
- In office January 5, 1953 – January 5, 1959
- Preceded by: Walton L. Ward
- Succeeded by: James R. Mitchell
- Constituency: 10th district

27th and 29th Comptroller of the Treasury of Tennessee
- In office 1946–1949
- Governor: Jim Nance McCord
- Preceded by: Sam Carson
- Succeeded by: Cedric Hunt
- In office 1945–1945
- Governor: Prentice Cooper; Jim Nance McCord
- Preceded by: Robert Lowe
- Succeeded by: Sam Carson

Personal details
- Born: John Jared Maddux; July 20, 1911 Buffalo Valley, Tennessee
- Died: May 22, 1971 (aged 59) Cookeville, Tennessee
- Party: Democratic
- Spouse: Mary Virginia Lane (m. 1935)

Military service
- Allegiance: United States
- Branch/service: United States Navy
- Years of service: 1945–1946
- Battles/wars: World War II

John Jared Maddux (July 20, 1911 – May 22, 1971) was a Tennessee politician.

== Early life and education ==
Maddux was born in Buffalo Valley, Putnam County, Tennessee on July 20, 1911. He graduated from high school in Bellevue, Davidson County, Tennessee in 1929. Maddux then earned a B.S. degree in accounting from the Tennessee Polytechnic Institute in 1934. He found work as a high school teacher and married Mary Virginia Lane in 1935. They had a daughter and a son.

Maddux taught high school in Johnson City and Elizabethton, Tennessee. He also worked as a bank teller in Elizabethton. Maddux returned to school, completing an LL.B. degree at East Tennessee Law School in 1937 and taking graduate courses at Northwestern University in 1938.

== Career ==
Maddux began to practice law in Elizabethton. He became active in Democratic Party politics, serving as campaign manager for Carter County, Tennessee in 1938, 1940, 1942 and 1944. Maddux was elected assistant chief clerk by the Tennessee House of Representatives in 1943 and served as chief clerk during the 1944 extra session.

Maddux was elected Comptroller of the Treasury of Tennessee by the Tennessee General Assembly in January 1945. He resigned in March 1945 to serve on active duty in the United States Navy during World War II. After being discharged in February 1946, he became state comptroller again in March 1946.

A member of the Tennessee State Senate, he was elected by his colleagues to serve as the 43rd lieutenant governor of Tennessee from 1953 to 1959 and again from 1965 to 1967 under Governor Frank G. Clement, longer than any other person except John S. Wilder, who held the office from 1971 to 2007.

The story of how he was elected to his final term is now something of a Tennessee political legend (see Frank Gorrell.) As of 2007, he is the only person to have served in the office for non-consecutive terms. His home was in Cookeville, Tennessee.

Political offices
Preceded by Robert Lowe	Comptroller of the Treasury of Tennessee; 1945	Succeeded by Sam Carson
Preceded by Sam Carson	Comptroller of the Treasury of Tennessee; 1946–1949	Succeeded by Cedric Hunt
Preceded by Walter M. Haynes	Lieutenant Governor of Tennessee; 1953–1959	Succeeded by William D. Baird
Preceded by James L. Bomar Jr.	Lieutenant Governor of Tennessee; 1965–1967	Succeeded by Frank Gorrell
