= List of speakers of the Tennessee House of Representatives =

The speaker of the Tennessee House of Representatives is the presiding officer of the Tennessee House of Representatives, the lower chamber of the Tennessee General Assembly, the state legislature of the U.S. state of Tennessee. The speaker is elected by other members of the House for a two-year term. The current Speaker is Cameron Sexton (R-Crossville). Sexton was elected and took over from Acting-Speaker Bill Dunn, who assumed office upon the resignation of Glen Casada, effective August 2, 2019.

Speakers of the Tennessee House of Representatives
Name	Term	Party	Life	Notes
David Wilson	1794–1795		c. 1752–1803	Speaker of the Southwest Territory House of Representatives
Joseph Hardin	1795–1796		1734–1801	Speaker of the Southwest Territory House of Representatives
James Stuart	1796–1799		c. 1751–1816	
William Dickson	1799–1803	Democratic-Republican	1770–1816	
James Stuart	1803–1805		c. 1751–1816	
Robert Coleman Foster	1805–1807		1769–1844	
John Tipton	1807–1809		1767-1831	
Joseph Dickson	1809–1811	Federalist	1745–1825	
Thomas Henderson	1811-1812	Democratic-Republican	1742-c.1827/32	
John Cocke	1812–1813	Democratic-Republican	1772–1854	
Thomas Claiborne	1813–1815	Democratic	1780–1856	
James Fentress	1815–1817	Democratic	1763–1843	
Thomas Williamson	1817–1819		1767–1825	
James Fentress	1819–1825	Democratic	1763–1843	
William Brady	1825–1827		d. 1835	
John H. Camp	1827–1829		1783–1829	
Ephraim H. Foster	1829–1831		1794–1854	
Frederick W. Huling	1831–1835	Democratic		
Ephraim H. Foster	1835–1837	Whig	1794–1854	
John Cocke	1837–1839	Whig	1772–1854	
Jonas E. Thomas	1839–1841	Democratic	1803–1856	
Burchet Douglass	1841–1842	Whig	1793–1849	
Franklin Buchanan	1842–1843	Whig	c. 1813–1851	
Daniel L. Barringer	1843–1845	Whig	1788–1852	
Brookins Campbell	1845–1847	Democratic	1808–1853	
Franklin Buchanan	1847–1849	Whig	c. 1813–1851	
Landon Carter Haynes	1849–1851	Democratic	1816–1875	
Jordan Stokes	1851–1853	Whig	1817–1886	
William H. Wisener	1853–1855	Whig	1812–1882	
Neill S. Brown	1855–1857	Whig	1818–1878	
Daniel S. Donelson	1857–1859	Democratic	1801–1863	
Washington C. Whitthorne	1859–1861	Democratic	1825–1891	
Edwin A. Keeble	1861–1862	Democratic	1807–1868	The state government was replaced by a military government in 1862
William Heiskell	1865–1867	Conservative Republican	1788–1871	Confusion over apparent resignation in July 1866 for refusing to sign the 14th Amendment
F. S. Richardson	1867–1869	Radical Republican		
William O'Neal Perkins	1869–1871	Conservative Republican	1815–1895	
James D. Richardson	1871–1873	Democratic	1843–1914	New state constitution adopted in 1870
William S. McGaughey	1873–1875	Democratic	1821–1889	
Lewis Bond	1875–1877	Democratic	1839–1878	
Edwin T. Taliaferro	1877–1879	Democratic	1849–1919	
Henry P. Fowlkes	1879–1881	Democratic	1843–1817	
Henry B. Ramsey	1881–1883	Republican	1847–1897	
Washington L. Ledgerwood	1883–1885	Democratic	1843–1911	
James A. Manson	1885–1887	Democratic	1842–1901	
Walker L. Clapp	1887–1891	Democratic	1850–1901	
Thomas R. Myers	1891–1893	Democratic	1840–1919	
Ralph Davis	1893	Democratic	1866–1952	
Julius A. Trousdale	1893–1895	Democratic	1840–1899	
John A. Tipton	1895–1897	Democratic	1858–1925	
Morgan C. Fitzpatrick	1897–1899	Democratic	1868–1908	
Joseph W. Byrns	1899–1901	Democratic	1869–1936	
Edgar B. Wilson	1901–1903	Democratic	1874–1953	
Lawrence Tyson	1903–1905	Democratic	1861–1929	
William K. Abernathy	1905–1907	Democratic	1870–1940	
John T. Cunningham	1907–1909	Democratic	1877–1945	
Matthew H. Taylor	1909–1911	Democratic	1884–1965	
Albert M. Leach	1911–1913	Democratic	1859–1926	
William M. Stanton	1913–1915	Democratic	1890–1957	
William P. Cooper	1915–1917	Democratic	1870–1961	
Clyde Shropshire	1917–1919	Democratic	1866–1949	
Seth M. Walker	1919–1921	Democratic	1892–1951	
Andrew L. Todd Sr.	1921–1923	Democratic	1872–1945	
Frank S. Hall	1923–1925	Democratic	1890–1958	
William F. Barry	1925–1927	Democratic	1900–1967	
Selden Maiden	1927–1929	Democratic	1883–1949	
Charles H. Love	1929–1931	Democratic	1874–1950	
Walter M. Haynes	1931–1933	Democratic	1897–1967	
Frank W. Moore	1933–1935	Democratic	1905–1982	
Walter M. Haynes	1935–1939	Democratic	1897–1967	
John Ed O'Dell	1939–1943	Democratic	1906–1956	
James J. Broome	1943–1945	Democratic	1884–1952	
George Woods	1945–1947	Democratic	1913–1982	
William Buford Lewallen	1947–1949	Democratic	1920–2003	
McAllen Foutch	1949–1953	Democratic	1909–1996	
James L. Bomar Jr.	1953–1963	Democratic	1914–2001	
Dick Barry	1963–1967	Democratic	1926–2013	
James H. Cummings	1967–1969	Democratic	1890–1979	
Bill Jenkins	1969–1971	Republican	1936–	
James R. McKinney	1971–1973	Democratic	1931–1992	
Ned McWherter	1973–1987	Democratic	1930–2011	
Ed Murray	1987–1991	Democratic	1928–2009	
Jimmy Naifeh	1991–2009	Democratic	1939–	
Kent Williams	2009–2011	Republican	1949–	
Beth Harwell	2011–2019	Republican	1957–	First woman to serve as Speaker of the House
Glen Casada	2019	Republican	1959–	Resigned
Cameron Sexton	2019–present	Republican	1970–	Elected Speaker on August 23, 2019

== See also ==
- List of Tennessee General Assemblies
