= Frank Gorrell =

American politician (1927–1994)

- Gorrell in 1964

47th Lieutenant Governor of Tennessee Speaker of the Tennessee Senate
- In office January 3, 1967 – January 7, 1971
- Governor: Buford Ellington
- Preceded by: Jared Maddux
- Succeeded by: John S. Wilder

Personal details
- Born: Frank Cheatham Gorrell; June 20, 1927 Russellville, Kentucky, U.S.
- Died: March 12, 1994 (aged 66) Brentwood, Tennessee, U.S.
- Party: Democratic
- Spouse: Bette Jamison (m. 1947; died 1991)
- Children: 3

Frank Cheatham Gorrell (June 20, 1927 – March 12, 1994) was an American politician who served as the 47th lieutenant governor of Tennessee from 1967 to 1971, during Governor Buford Ellington's second term.

== Early years ==
Gorrell was born in Russellville, Kentucky, and studied at the Staunton Military Academy. He then attended college and played college football at Vanderbilt University in Nashville, completing his A.B. degree in 1949. After college, he attended law school at Vanderbilt earning an LL.B. degree in 1952, then joined the Nashville law firm of Bass, Berry & Sims.

== Career ==
In 1947, while a student at Vanderbilt, he married Bette Jamison, which connected him to the powerful Middle Tennessee Jamison family, whose interests included a mattress factory near downtown Franklin, Tennessee. In 1964, Governor Frank G. Clement decided that he desired Gorrell to be lieutenant governor to replace the outgoing James L. Bomar Jr. The Tennessee General Assembly had begun to show a measure of independence from the executive branch of government in this era but was generally still largely subject to it. However, a faction of the Democratic Caucus in the Tennessee State Senate, which in Tennessee elects the lieutenant governor from its own members, had decided to resist the selection of Gorrell. They were joined by the relatively small Republican Caucus, which proposed the election of former lieutenant governor Jared Maddux, who had previously served as lieutenant governor during Clement's first administration.

A "nose count" revealed a total of sixteen Senators supporting Clement's selection of Gorrell, and sixteen supporting Maddux. The remaining member, Senator Charles O'Brien of Crossville, was in seclusion and could not be reached by either side. Clement, sensing victory, sent his sister Anna Belle, who also served as his chief of staff, to visit O'Brien's home and persuade him to support Gorrell. Exactly what occurred is unknown, but while O'Brien voted for Maddux, who was returned to office, Anna Belle Clement married Senator O'Brien, later serving in the Senate herself as Anna Belle Clement O'Brien, while Senator O'Brien later went on to serve as Chief Justice of the Tennessee Supreme Court. Gorrell's turn was to come two years later.

Gorrell was regarded as being both pro-business and somewhat progressive. After leaving state government he became a lobbyist and was regarded as the most influential lobbyist in the state at the time of his death.

== Death ==
Gorrell died in March 1994 as a result of a choking incident at a restaurant in Brentwood, Tennessee. He was interred at Mount Olivet Cemetery in Nashville.

Political offices
Preceded by Jared Maddux	Lieutenant Governor of Tennessee; 1967–1971	Succeeded by John S. Wilder
