= Ambrose B. Broadbent =

American politician and judge

Broadbent in 1938

Ambrose Byron Broadbent (November 21, 1885, near Cadiz, Kentucky – June 15, 1952, in Clarksville, Tennessee) was an American lawyer, Democratic politician, and judge in the state of Tennessee. He served as the speaker of the Tennessee Senate from 1931 to 1933 and Secretary of State from 1937 to 1941.

== Early life ==
Broadbent was born on a farm outside Cadiz, Kentucky. His father Peter Harris Broadbent (1859–1956) and his mother Katherine "Kitty" Jones Broadbent (1862–1949) were both long-lived, with his father out-living his son. The family moved to Montgomery County, Tennessee in 1895.

Broadbent attended public schools and then received an LL.B. degree from Cumberland School of Law in Lebanon, Tennessee in 1912. After setting up practice in Clarksville, Tennessee close to his parents' home, Broadbent became involved in Tennessee Democratic politics. In 1917, he and fellow Clarksville lawyer Austin Peay were charter members of the Clarksville Rotary Club.

== Career ==
Broadbent managed the campaigns for governor of Austin Peay in 1922, 1924, and 1926, and that of Gordon Browning in 1936. In 1928, he served as a delegate to the Democratic National Convention. From 1931 to 1935, he served in the Tennessee state senate, and he was elected speaker for the 1931–33 session after the resignation of Scott Fitzhugh. Broadbent was elected speaker at a time when Governor Henry Hollis Horton was facing impeachment; Broadbent was considered to be an independent and an opponent of E. H. Crump, the Memphis political boss who was pushing for Horton's impeachment. The speaker of the senate also served as the successor to the governor in case of death or resignation, being effectively the lieutenant governor. From 1937 to 1941, he served as Tennessee Secretary of State. From 1945 to 1951, he served as a county court judge; from 1951 until his death, as a criminal court judge.

Broadbent married Belle Banister of Clarksville on November 16, 1938. He is buried in Greenwood Cemetery in Clarksville.

== Legacy ==
Broadbent is pictured on a mural at Austin Peay State University in Clarksville, as one of the civic leaders who suggested that the city purchase a vacant college campus and use it for a teachers' college.

Political offices
Preceded by Ernest N. Hasten	Secretary of State of Tennessee; 1937–1941	Succeeded by Joe C. Carr
