= List of Memphis Tigers men's basketball head coaches =

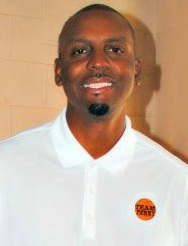
Penny Hardaway, the current head coach of the Memphis Tigers.

The following is a list of Memphis Tigers men's basketball head coaches. There have been 19 head coaches of the Tigers in their 102-season history.

Memphis' current head coach is Penny Hardaway. He was hired as the Tigers' head coach in March 2018, replacing Tubby Smith, who was fired after the 2017–18 season.

No.	Tenure	Coach	Years	Record	Pct.
1	1920–1921	H. Kirk Grantham	1	22–7–1	.750
2	1921–1922	W. H. DePriest	1	1–7	.125
3	1922–1924	Lester Barnard	2	10–13	.435
4	1924–1948 (Note: Memphis did not field a team for the 1943–44 season.)	Zach Curlin	23	173–184	.485
5	1948–1951	McCoy Tarry	3	40–27	.597
6	1951–1956	Eugene Lambert	5	87–45	.659
7	1956–1962	Bob Vanatta	6	109–34	.762
8	1962–1966	Dean Ehlers	4	53–47	.530
9	1966–1970	Moe Iba	4	37–65	.363
10	1970–1974	Gene Bartow	4	83–32	.722
11	1974–1979	Wayne Yates	5	93–49	.655
12	1979–1986	Dana Kirk	7	158–58	.731
13	1986–1997	Larry Finch	11	220–130	.629
14	1997–1999 (Note: Price resigned November 14, 1999 after an affair with a student came to light. Johnny Jones was named interim head coach for the 1999–2000 season.)	Tic Price	2	30–27	.526
15	1999–2000*	Johnny Jones	1	15–16	.484
16	2000–2009 (Note: Memphis vacated its entire 2007–08 season. Calipari's on-court record is 252–69 (.785).)	John Calipari	9	214–67	.762
17	2009–2016	Josh Pastner	7	167–73	.696
18	2016–2018	Tubby Smith	2	40–26	.606
19	2018–present (Note: Memphis vacated one win from the 2019–20 season. Hardaway suspended first 3 games 2023-24 and ineligible to be credited for game results. Hardaway's on-court record is 162–68 (.704).)	Penny Hardaway	7	162–68	.704
Totals		19 coaches	102 seasons	1,662–959–1	.634
Records updated through end of 2022–23 season * - Denotes interim head coach. Source
