= Tazewell W. Newman =

American politician (1822–1868)

Tazewell W. Newman (27 Mar 1822 – 2 Oct 1868) served as Speaker of the Tennessee Senate, including in the role of Lieutenant Governor of Tennessee. He was a Democrat.

A native of Virginia, he studied in Knoxville, Tennessee. He was the oldest son of Jacob Newman. He served as Tennessee's speaker of the senate / Lieutenant governor in 1860 and 1861. He represented Winchester, Lincoln, and Franklin counties. He served in The Confederate Army during the American Civil War. He lived in Winchester, Tennessee where he died at his home in 1868.

in 1860, he wrote to Andrew Johnson discussing the Democrat Party in Tennessee, the nomination process and the candidates and party's prospects.

He was attended in the state senate by a boy named Buck. He was buried in the Winchester Cemetery.
