= Ivy Scarborough =

American author and lawyer

Ivy Scarborough is an American author who lives in Jackson, TN, U.S.A. Scarborough is an accomplished lawyer with a Doctor of Jurisprudence degree, emphasis in international law, from the University of Memphis School of Law. Scarborough is also a television, radio and print commentator, speaker, radio program host, and former adjunct professor of international studies, history and political science at Union University, Jackson, Tennessee.

His career has focused on international affairs, the Christian faith, national defense, terrorism and world religion.

Ivy Scarborough's first book was titled Winning Against DUI and was endorsed by MADD (Mothers Against Drunk Driving) and RID (Remove Intoxicated Drivers.) It dealt with the legal, social, and media issues related to drunk driving. The full text is available to read as a PDF download from Scarborough's Law Practice.

In 2011, Scarborough published his second book - Into the Night: The Crisis of Western Civilization, his controversial review of Western civilization’s pilgrimage into a new Dark Age.

Scarborough is 200 centimetres (6 feet 7 inches) tall.
