= L. Thomas Strong III =

Dr. L. Thomas Strong III is an American Christian scholar and the Dean of Leavell College at New Orleans Baptist Theological Seminary and teaches New Testament and Greek in Leavell College. He serves as senior pastor of Metairie Baptist Church in Metairie, Louisiana.

== Education ==
- New Orleans Baptist Theological Seminary, Ph.D., May 1992, Major in New Testament and Greek
- New Orleans Baptist Theological Seminary, M.Div., May 1987, Major in Biblical Studies
- Union University, B.A., May 1983, Major in Religion, Greek, and Sociology
- He was nominated and elected as "Mr. Union University, 1983.

== Teaching experience ==
- Dean, Leavell College of New Orleans Baptist Theological Seminary, August 1999-present.
- Professor of New Testament and Greek, NOBTS, Aug. 1993-present
- Contract Teacher/Adjunct Faculty, Biblical Studies Division, NOBTS, Aug. 1990-July 1991
- Contract Teacher/Adjunct Faculty, School of Christian Training, NOBTS, Jan. 1988-June 1990
- Adjunct Faculty, Religion Department, William Carey School of Nursing, Jan. 1989-Dec. 1989.

== Honors ==
- Received the Marvin Jones Award for Outstanding Churchmanship among the Faculty of NOBTS, presented May 2007. This award is based on faculty nominations and vote in order to recognize faculty members who have served in an effective manner as a leader in a local church.
- Received the Academic Excellence Medals for highest GPA in the fields of Religion, Greek, and Sociology from Union University at time of graduation, May 1983.
- Graduated from Union University in May 1983 Magna Cum Laude.

== Fellowships ==
- Fellow, Dr. Jerry Breazeale, NOBTS, Aug. 1986-June 1990
- Fellow, Dr. Gerald Stevens, NOBTS, Aug. 1988-Dec. 1988

== Teaching specializations ==
- "The Significance of the `Knowledge of God’ in the Epistles of Paul", NOBTS, Ph.D. Diss., May 1992
- Collator, International Greek New Testament Project, 1993-present
- "Mentoring in the Seminary Community." Ola Farmer Lenaz Lecture. Presented at NOBTS, May 20, 1999 and at the International Mentoring Association Meeting in Atlanta, Georgia on April 16, 1999.

== Ministry experience ==
- Senior Pastor, Metairie Baptist Church, Metairie, Louisiana, March 2005 – present
- Interim Pastor, Metairie Baptist Church, Metairie, Louisiana, May 2003-March 2005
- Interim Pastor, Westside Baptist Church, Ponchatoula, Louisiana, Oct. 1994-1995
- Interim Pastor, Enon Baptist Church, Franklinton, Louisiana, July 1993-Dec. 1993
- Pastor, Enon Baptist Church, Franklinton, Louisiana, Nov. 1989-July 1993
- Baptist Student Union Director and Semester Missionary, Wayne State University, Detroit, Michigan, Aug. 1983-May 1984
- Short Term Missionary, Burkina Faso, West Africa, Jan. 1983
- Short Term Missionary, Hurlock, Maryland, May - Aug. 1980
- He was a Deacon, Sunday School Teacher, Coordinator of Discipleship at his previous church.

== Publications ==
- "An Essential Unity," The Theological Educator, Fall 1996
- "Contrasts: Luke 18," The Theological Educator, Fall 1997
- "Mentoring in a Seminary Community," The Proceedings of the International Mentoring Association, Fall 1999
- Two Articles in Eerdman's Bible Dictionary
- "Roman Emperor Claudius," The Bible Illustrator, Fall 1998

== External sources and links ==
- Disciplining Christians
- Faculty Profile
- Leveall College
