= Harry Lee Poe =

American academic (born 1950)

- Born: November 16, 1950; United States

Education
- Education: University of South Carolina (BA) Southern Baptist Theological Seminary (M.Div., Ph.D.)

Philosophical work
- Era: 20th-century philosophy
- Region: Western philosophy
- Main interests: Epistemology, Christian apologetics, philosophy of religion, systematic theology, Edgar Allan Poe, C.S. Lewis, Evangelism

Harry Lee Poe (born 1950) is an American academic. He is the Charles Colson Chair of Faith and Culture at Union University in Jackson, Tennessee, and author of a number of books.

He is a relative of the family of Edgar Allan Poe and president of the Poe Foundation. He was the director of the Poe writers conference in 2007.

His book Edgar Allan Poe: An Illustrated Companion to His Tell-Tale Stories won the Edgar Award for 2009 in the category best critical/biographical. The same book received an Agatha nomination for best non-fiction book.

== Bibliography ==
- The Fruit of Christ's Presence (1990) ISBN 0-8054-6012-8
- The Gospel and Its Meaning: A Theology for Evangelism and Church Growth (1996) ISBN 0-310-20172-1
- Science and Faith: An Evangelical Dialogue [Co-author] (2000) ISBN 0-8054-2142-4
- Christian Witness in a Postmodern World (2001) ISBN 0-687-04931-8
- Designer Universe: Intelligent Design and the Existence of God [Co-authored with Jimmy H Davis] (2002) ISBN 0-8054-2447-4
- Christianity in the Academy: Teaching at the Intersection of Faith and Learning (2004) ISBN 0-8010-2723-3
- C. S. Lewis Remembered: Collected Reflections of Students, Friends & Colleagues ISBN 0-310-26509-6
- See No Evil: The Existence of Sin in an Age of Relativism (2004) ISBN 0-8254-3371-1
- What God Knows: Time and the Question of Divine Knowledge (2005) ISBN 1-932792-12-0
- Meditations on the good, the true, and the beautiful (2008) ISBN 0-8272-1252-6
- The Inklings of Oxford : a pictorial account (2008) ISBN 0-310-28503-8
- Chance or dance : an evaluation of design (2008) ISBN 1-59947-133-7
- Edgar Allan Poe: An Illustrated Companion to His Tell-Tale Stories (2008) ISBN 1-4351-0469-2 NOTE: This title won the 2009 Edgar award in the category best critical/biographical.
- God and the Cosmos: Divine Activity in Space, Time and History [co-authored with Jimmy H Davis] (2012) ISBN 0-8308-3954-2
- Evermore: Edgar Allan Poe and the Mystery of the Universe (2012) ISBN 1-6025-8322-6
