= James L. Bomar Jr. =

American politician

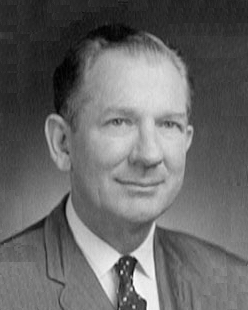
- Official portrait, 1961

45th Lieutenant Governor of Tennessee
- In office January 7, 1963 – January 4, 1965
- Governor: Frank G. Clement
- Preceded by: William D. Baird
- Succeeded by: Jared Maddux

Member of the Tennessee Senate
- In office January 7, 1963 – January 4, 1965
- Preceded by: Barton Dement
- Succeeded by: Ward Crutchfield
- Constituency: 12th district
- In office January 6, 1947 – January 3, 1949
- Preceded by: Robert I. Dossett
- Succeeded by: John D. Wooten
- Constituency: 18th district

72nd Speaker of the Tennessee House of Representatives
- In office January 5, 1953 – January 7, 1963
- Preceded by: McAllen Foutch
- Succeeded by: Dick Barry

Member of the Tennessee House of Representatives from Bedford County
- In office January 5, 1953 – January 7, 1963
- Preceded by: Ewing Cartwright
- Succeeded by: Tyrus H. Cobb
- In office January 3, 1949 – January 1, 1951
- Preceded by: Frank M. Jackson
- Succeeded by: Ewing Cartwright
- In office January 4, 1943 – January 1, 1945
- Preceded by: William L. Parker
- Succeeded by: J. Harrison Davidson

Personal details
- Born: James Lafayette Bomar Jr. July 1, 1914 Raus, Tennessee, U.S.
- Died: June 25, 2001 (aged 86) Shelbyville, Tennessee, U.S.
- Party: Democratic
- Spouse: Edith Cora Dees (m. 1940)
- Education: Cumberland University

Military service
- Branch/service: United States Navy
- Years of service: 1944–1945
- Rank: Lieutenant (junior grade)
- Battles/wars: World War II; American theater

James Lafayette Bomar Jr. (July 1, 1914 – June 25, 2001) was an American lawyer and politician who served in both houses of the Tennessee General Assembly. He served as Speaker of the Tennessee House of Representatives from 1953 to 1963 and as Speaker of the Senate and the 45th lieutenant governor of Tennessee from 1963 to 1965. From 1979 to 1980, he was the president of Rotary International.

Political offices
Preceded by William D. Baird	Lieutenant Governor of Tennessee; 1963–1965	Succeeded by Jared Maddux
