= Albert Prago =

American historian

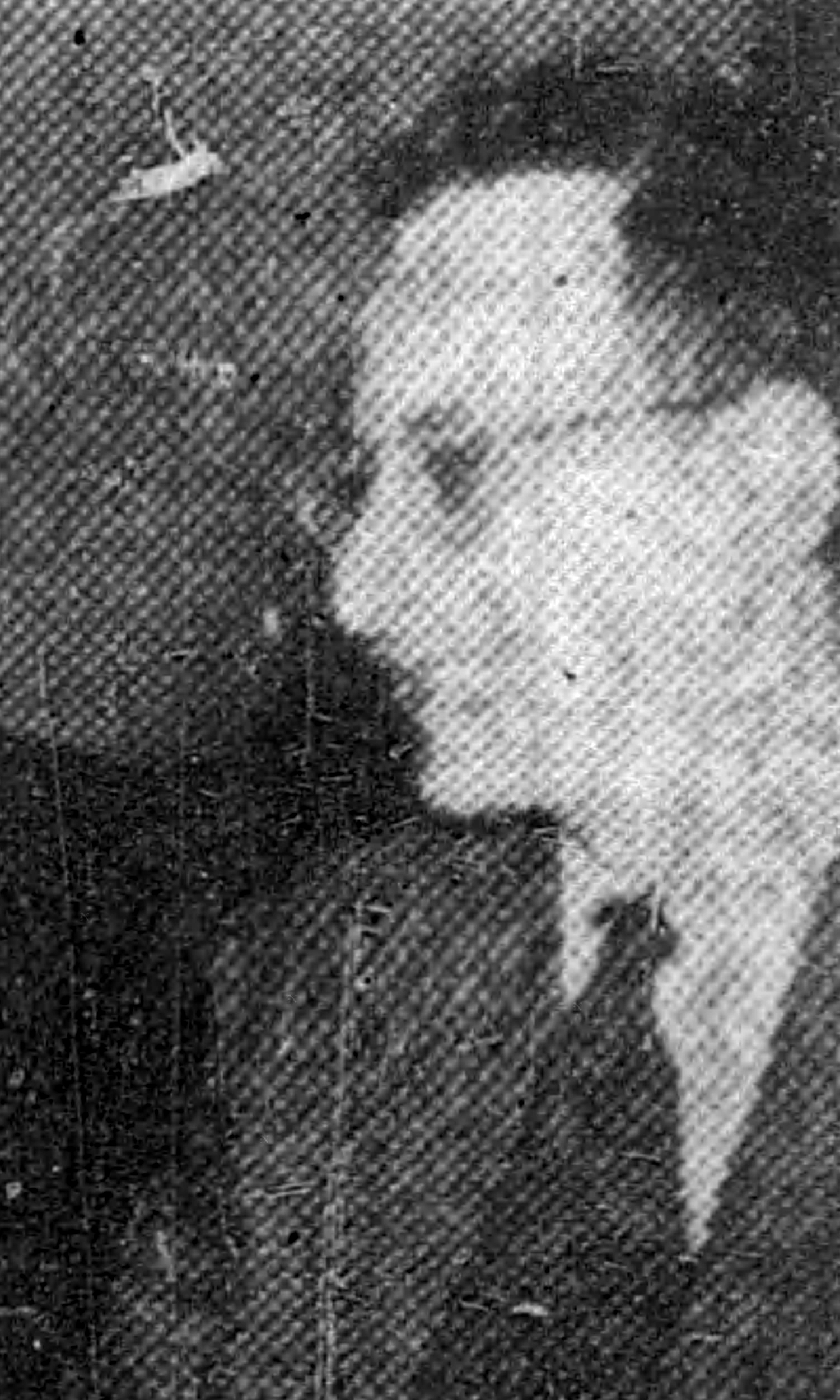
Prago c. 1947

Albert Prago (November 17, 1911 – July 1993) was an American historian.

== Biography ==
Albert Prago was born in 1911 in New York City in Latvian-Jewish family. In 1934 he joined the Communist Party and was involved in the Battle of Belchite in March 1938 during the Spanish Civil War. In there, he served under Lincoln Brigade as an Anglo-American editor and interpreter. He was wounded in his thigh during the second battle and spent more than a year in a hospital with osteomyelitis. He came back to New York same year but still was politically active. He got his Ph.D. in history by the time he turned 65 from Union University and later on taught history at such places as Jefferson School of Social Science, Hofstra University, Cornell University, Empire State College, and the New School for Social Research. In 1987 he published a book called Our Fight: Writings by Veterans of the Abraham Lincoln Brigade which was co-edited by Alvah Bessie in which he explained the role of Jews and women in the conflict. Later on, he retired to West Palm Beach, Florida where he died of cancer in July 1993.
