= Jeanette Brooks Priebe =

Kentucky woman during the Civil Rights Era

Jeanette Brooks Priebe (born July 4, 1937) was the Tennessee-born Director of the Louisville Civil Service Board in Kentucky when she instituted the first affirmative action hiring program for the Louisville metro area public service personnel. During the 1970s, Priebe directed the integration of the Louisville Metro Police Department and the Louisville Division of Fire.

Priebe led her department in devising a new method of hiring new applicants. Instead of receiving only the top candidates, the hiring department would be able to review all applicants, assuring then that all were considered – including African Americans and women. The new organizational process included a specific job classification system that took a year of intense analysis to complete. Four years before, these descriptions were vague, and a class action suit had been filed on behalf of the one African-American employee. The county government's Personnel Department became "more centralized and, more importantly, more professional." There were also new procedures for applicant screening and recruiting. Priebe once said, "Unless you're allowed to find the most qualified people, it's a literal misuse of tax money."

After working as the Director of the Civil Service Board, Priebe worked for then-Judge Mitch McConnell as Jefferson County Personnel and Executive Council Agency Member-At-Large for the International Personnel Management Association.

Jeanette Brooks Priebe was born in Bolivar, Tennessee and attended Union University in Jackson, Tennessee before enrolling in Northwestern University in Evanston, Illinois. She was the first woman to serve as the Director of the Civil Service Board in Louisville, Kentucky.

== See also ==
- Workplace discrimination
- Employment discrimination law in the United States
- Affirmative Action
