= Joe C. Carr =

American politician

Carr in 1960

Joseph Cordell Carr, Sr. (June 20, 1907 – October 12, 1981) was a Democratic Party politician in the state of Tennessee who served almost 27 years as Tennessee Secretary of State.

== Biography ==
=== Early life ===
Joseph Carr was born June 20, 1907, in Cookeville, Tennessee. His father, Sidney Forrest Carr, worked for nine years as a clerk in the Tennessee Secretary of State's office and was a one-term member of the Tennessee General Assembly, representing Putnam County from 1919 to 1921. He also was a campaign manager for U.S. Congressman Cordell Hull.

The Carr family moved to Nashville in 1918, and Joe Carr was educated at Montgomery Bell Academy and the Peabody Demonstration School in Nashville. His first experience in state government was serving as a page in the Tennessee State Senate in 1923, when he was 16. His first experience in a political campaign came in 1924, when he was an office boy in the campaign headquarters for U.S. Senate candidate Nathan Bachman. In 1925 he served as a page in the Tennessee House of Representatives. He continued to work on the staff of the state legislature in subsequent years, holding positions as assistant bill clerk, assistant chief clerk, and chief clerk of the Tennessee House of Representatives.

=== Political career ===
In 1932, Joe Carr was one of the founding members of the Young Democratic Clubs of Tennessee, serving as the organization's first secretary. In 1934 he was elected state president of the Young Democrats. In 1940, he was manager for the re-election campaigns of the "Coalition Ticket," three Democratic candidates backed by Memphis political boss Edward Crump: Governor Prentice Cooper, U.S. Senator Kenneth McKellar, and Commissioner of Railroads and Public Utilities Porter Dunlap.

His service to the party having earned him Crump's support, on January 8, 1941, the Tennessee General Assembly elected Carr to the position of Secretary of State by a unanimous vote. He was to serve in that office longer than any other Tennessee Secretary of State, serving on three occasions for a total of almost 27 years. His first term in the position ended in May 1944, when he voluntarily enlisted in the U.S. Army during World War II. Governor Cooper appointed Carr's wife, Mary Hart Carr, to fill her husband's unexpired term, making her the first woman to serve as a state constitutional officer in Tennessee. After Carr's four-year term ended in January 1945, Mrs. Carr was elected to a new four-year term by the General Assembly. When Joe Carr returned home in the summer of 1945, Mrs. Carr resigned the seat, and Governor Jim Nance McCord appointed him to take up the job again beginning August 1.

In 1948, incumbent governor Jim Nance McCord lost his bid for renomination to Gordon Browning, a former governor who campaigned for the Democratic nomination as an opponent of Crump. After Browning and his allies gained control of the Tennessee state government, Carr, who was allied with Crump, was replaced as Secretary of State in January 1949, when the General Assembly elected James Cummings to the office.

After losing his position in state government, Carr embarked on a short career in the private sector, establishing an insurance business in Nashville. In 1952 he joined Frank G. Clement's gubernatorial campaign as an advisor and staff member. In January 1953, following Clement's election as governor, Carr became chief clerk of the Tennessee House of Representatives. Four years later, in January 1957, the General Assembly returned him to the position of Secretary of State. He held the office for the next 20 years, retiring in January 1977.

=== U.S. Supreme Court case ===
As secretary of state, and thus the official responsible for conducting elections in the state, Joe Carr was the nominal defendant in the famous 1962 U.S. Supreme Court case Baker v. Carr, in which the Supreme Court held that Congressional and legislative districts had to be of substantially equal populations in order to comply with the "equal protection" provision of the Fourteenth Amendment to the United States Constitution (the so-called "one man one vote" decision). Carr's name on the case as defendant was merely ex officio; the General Assembly, not the secretary of state, was responsible for setting the district boundaries. His responsibility was to publish the resulting map and conduct elections accordingly.

=== Final years ===
After Carr's retirement, a bronze bust of him was placed in the Tennessee State Capitol at the direction of the General Assembly and Governor Ray Blanton. He was the first person to be honored in that way during his lifetime.

Carr died from cancer at Baptist Hospital in Nashville on October 12, 1981. He was buried at Woodlawn Memorial Park in Nashville.

Political offices
Preceded by A. B. Broadbent	Secretary of State of Tennessee; 1941–1944	Succeeded by Mary Hart Carr
Preceded by Mary Hart Carr	Secretary of State of Tennessee; 1945–1949	Succeeded by James H. Cummings
Preceded by G. Edward Friar	Secretary of State of Tennessee; 1957–1977	Succeeded by Gentry Crowell
