= Dick Barry =

American lawyer and politician

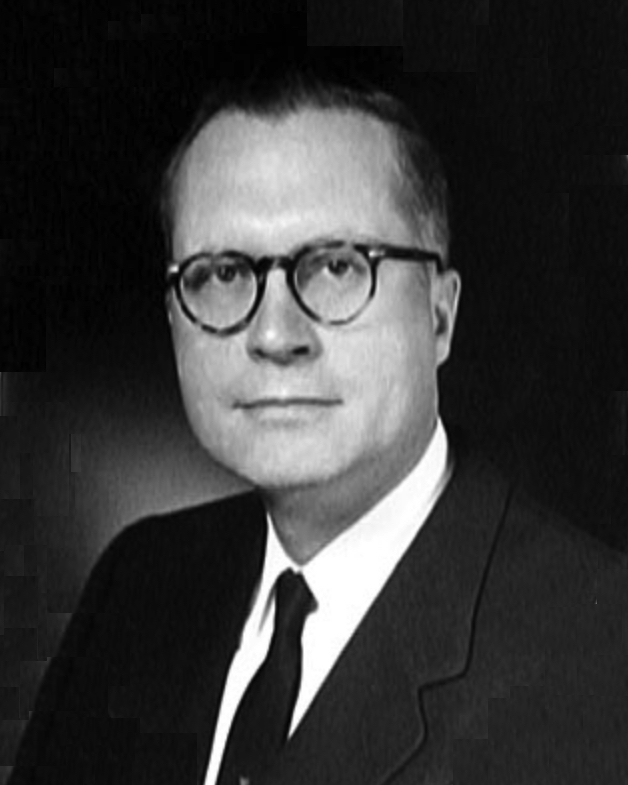
- Official portrait, 1965

73rd Speaker of the Tennessee House of Representatives
- In office January 7, 1963 – January 3, 1967
- Preceded by: James L. Bomar Jr.
- Succeeded by: James H. Cummings

Member of the Tennessee House of Representatives
- In office January 3, 1955 – January 3, 1967
- Preceded by: Joe R. Murphy Jr.
- Succeeded by: Edward Bailey
- Constituency: 23rd district (1955–1963); 26th district (1963–1965); 27th district (1965–1967)

Personal details
- Born: William Logan Barry; February 9, 1926 Lexington, Tennessee, U.S.
- Died: May 22, 2013 (aged 87) Lexington, Tennessee, U.S.
- Party: Democratic
- Education: Vanderbilt University (BA, JD)

Military service
- Branch/service: United States Army

William Logan Barry (February 9, 1926 – May 22, 2013) was an American lawyer and politician.

Born in Lexington, Tennessee, Barry served in the United States Army in Japan. He received his bachelors and law degrees from Vanderbilt University and practiced law. Barry served on the Lexington, Tennessee city council in 1953. He then served in the Tennessee House of Representatives 1954–1967, as a Democrat, and was the speaker. He died in Lexington, Tennessee.
