= Tennessee Secretary of State =

Political office of the state government of Tennessee

Secretary of State of Tennessee
- Great Seal of the State of Tennessee

- Flag of the State of Tennessee

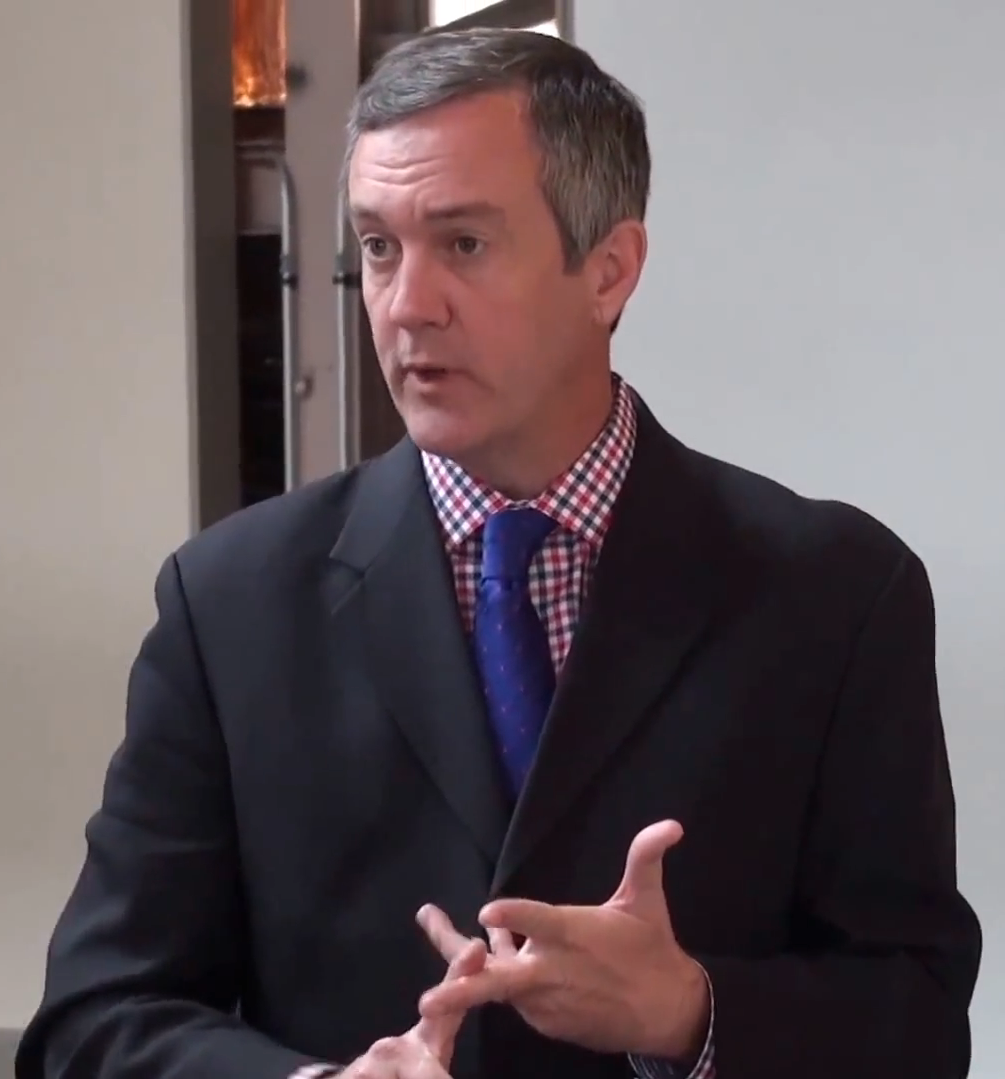
- Incumbent; Tre Hargett since January 15, 2009
- Department of State
- Type: Secretary of State
- Appointer: Tennessee General Assembly
- Term length: Four years
- Constituting instrument: Tennessee State Constitution
- Formation: 1792
- First holder: Daniel Smith
- Website: Tennessee Secretary of State website

The Tennessee Secretary of State is an office created by the Tennessee State Constitution. The Secretary of State is responsible for many of the administrative aspects of the operation of the state government of Tennessee. The current Secretary of State is Tre Hargett.

== Selection process ==
According to the Tennessee Constitution of 1870, the Secretary of State is to be elected to a four-year term by the General Assembly in a joint convention. "Joint convention" means that the 99 state Representatives and 33 state Senators sit as a single body and cast individual votes. A majority of the 132 votes (67) is thus required for election. As this office is elected on a partisan basis, this means that the party having an overall majority of members in the two houses will elect its nominee secretary of state. Since Reconstruction, in Tennessee this invariably resulted in the secretary of state being a Democrat until 2009, when the Republicans gained the majority of seats in the General Assembly. The election of the secretary of state occurs in the cycle opposite to that of the election of the governor of Tennessee; in other words the term of the Tennessee Secretary of State is roughly coincident with that of the President of the United States, generally beginning and ending only a few days earlier.

Tennessee's method of selection stands in contrast to that of nearly all other U.S. states, where the secretary of state is generally either popularly elected on a statewide basis or appointed by the governor of the state. In contrast to the practice of some states, in Tennessee the secretary of state is not high in the order of succession to the governorship; the speakers of the Senate and House are the first two in line.

Secretary of State is one of only three state "constitutional officers" other than governor under the Tennessee Constitution; most other states have more. In contrast to this office, the other two, the State Treasurer and the Comptroller of the Treasury, are elected by the joint convention to two-year terms. There are no constitutional limits on the number of terms to which a person can be elected to any of these offices. The agency headed by the secretary of state is officially styled the "Tennessee Department of State".

== Duties ==
As the secretary of state is elected by the legislature, the secretary of state's office is considered to be part of the legislative branch, not the executive branch, of government in Tennessee. Duties of the secretary of state's office include the chartering of corporations, the registration of trademarks and service marks, and the administration of elections. The secretary of state also publishes the biennial Tennessee Blue Book, the official guide to all three branches of Tennessee State Government, and other state publications including the publication of all public and private acts enacted by the General Assembly. The secretary of state is further charged with the regulation of charitable solicitations, the operations of the state library and archives, and the administration of the state Economic Commission on Women. To discharge the above duties, the Tennessee Department of State employs several administrative law judges.

The secretary of state collects an annual salary of $222,252, making them the highest-remunerated secretary of state in the country.

== In history ==
According to some historians, during the American Civil War, Secretary of State Edward H. East succeeded to the governorship when Andrew Johnson, who had served as military governor, became Vice President of the United States on March 4, 1865, and served as governor until April 5, when William "Parson" Brownlow was inaugurated as governor. The official Tennessee Blue Book, published by the secretary of state's office, does not include East on its list of governors. As the Tennessee General Assembly ceased to meet during the Civil War and much of the ordinary process of government ceased effective function in the state, East had been appointed Secretary of State by Johnson. Those who recognize East's governorship do so on the theory that he was the highest-ranking remaining state official once Johnson had become Vice President.

Joe C. Carr served as secretary of state on three occasions for a total of 27 years in the office, making him the longest-serving secretary; in addition, his wife held the office while he was in military service during World War II. As secretary of state and thus the official responsible for conducting elections in the state, he was the nominal defendant in the famous 1962 Supreme Court case Baker v. Carr, in which the Supreme Court held that Congressional and legislative districts had to be of substantially equal populations in order to comply with the "equal protection" provision of the Fourteenth Amendment to the United States Constitution (the so-called "one man one vote" decision). (Carr's name as defendant was merely ex officio; the General Assembly, not the secretary of state, was responsible for setting the district boundaries, Carr's responsibility was to publish the resulting map and conduct elections accordingly.)

In the 1970s and 1980s the secretary of state's office was given the responsibility for issuing and administering bingo licenses. An investigation into irregularities in the issuance of these licenses (Operation Rocky Top) resulted in several indictments and the suicide of then-Secretary of State Gentry Crowell. As a result, bingo was made illegal in Tennessee, which it remains, except that it has been legal as an annual fundraising event for a recognized 501c(19) war veteran's organization since a 2014 amendment to the state constitution.

The current secretary of state, Tre Hargett, has served since January 2009. He had previously served as Minority Leader in the Tennessee House of Representatives.

=== List of past secretaries of state ===
The following have held the office of Secretary of State in Tennessee:

Image	Name	Term
	Daniel Smith (Territorial Secretary of Territory South of the River Ohio)	1792–1796
	William Maclin	1796–1807
	Robert Houston	1807–1811
	William Grainger Blount	1811–1815
	William Alexander	1815–1818
	Daniel Graham	1818–1830
	Thomas H. Fletcher	1830–1832
	Samuel G. Smith	1832–1835
	Luke Lea	1835–1839
	John S. Young	1839–1847
	W .B. A. Ramsey	1847–1855
	F. N. W. Burton	1855–1859
	J. E. R. Ray	1859–1862
	Edward H. East (appointed by Andrew Johnson, Military Governor of Tennessee)	1862–1865
	A. J. Fletcher	1865–1870
	T. H. Butler	1870–1873
	Charles N. Gibbs	1873–1881
	David A. Nunn	1881–1885
	John Allison	1885–1889
	Charles A. Miller	1889–1893
	William S. Morgan	1893–1901
	John W. Morton	1901–1909
	Hallum W. Goodloe	1909–1913
	R. R. Sneed	1913–1917
	Ike B. Stevens	1917–1921
	Ernest N. Haston	1921–1937
	Ambrose B. Broadbent	1937–1941
	Joe C. Carr	1941–1944
	Mary Hart Carr (Mrs. Joe C. Carr)	1944–1945
	Joe C. Carr	1945–1949
	James H. Cummings	1949–1953
	George Edward Friar	1953–1957
	Joe C. Carr	1957–1977
	Gentry Crowell	1977–1989
	Milton P. Rice	1989–1990
	Bryant Millsaps	1990–1993
	Riley Darnell	1993–2009
	Tre Hargett	2009–present

== See also ==
- Government of Tennessee
