= Gentry Crowell =

American politician

Gentry Crowell (December 10, 1932 – December 20, 1989) was an American politician who served as Tennessee secretary of state. His office was investigated in Operation Rocky Top, leading to his suicide.

Crowell was born December 10, 1932, in Chestnut Mound, Tennessee. A Democrat, he served in the Tennessee House of Representatives from 1969 to 1977 (86th to 89th Tennessee General Assemblies), serving at various times as chairman of the General Welfare Committee, Rules Committee, and the House Democratic Caucus. He was first elected secretary of state by the state legislature in 1977, took office that year, and continued in that position until his death, having been re-elected by the legislature in 1981, 1985, and 1989.

In January 1979, while serving as secretary of state, Crowell witnessed Governor Ray Blanton's signature on the pardons and commutations of prison sentences that Blanton notoriously issued shortly before leaving office. While signing the pardon of Roger Humphreys, the son of a Blanton supporter, who had been convicted of killing his ex-wife and a male companion in 1973, Blanton stated, "this takes guts," to which Crowell, disgusted with the pardons, responded, "some people have more guts than they've got brains."

== Operation Rocky Top ==
In 1989, the Tennessee Secretary of State's office was a target of an FBI investigation called Operation Rocky Top, due to involvement in a public corruption scandal involving fund-raising irregularities and fraudulent charity bingo operations.

Crowell's administrative assistant was indicted for embezzlement of thousands of dollars from the Democratic Caucus campaign fund, of which Crowell was treasurer. Crowell was called to testify before the federal grand jury in the Rocky Top investigation, but was not indicted in the investigation. He died at age 57 on December 20, 1989, after shooting himself in the mouth with a .38-caliber pistol on December 12.

He is buried in Cedar Grove Cemetery in Lebanon, Tennessee.

Political offices
Preceded by Joe C. Carr	Secretary of State of Tennessee; 1977–1989	Succeeded by Milton P. Rice
