= James Fentress =

American politician (1763–1843)

Speaker of the Tennessee House of Representatives
- In office 1815–1817
- Preceded by: Thomas Claiborne
- Succeeded by: Thomas Williamson
- In office 1819–1825
- Preceded by: Thomas Williamson
- Succeeded by: William Brady

Personal details
- Born: February 16, 1763 New Hanover County, North Carolina
- Died: June 20, 1843 (aged 80)
- Party: Democratic Party

James Fentress (February 16, 1763 – June 20, 1843) was a Tennessee politician and Speaker of the Tennessee House of Representatives. Born in New Hanover County, North Carolina in 1763, he moved to Montgomery County, Tennessee in 1800. He was elected to the Tennessee House of Representatives as a Democrat in 1809. He served as Speaker of the House from 1815 to 1817 and again from 1819 to 1825. Fentress later served as chairman of the Montgomery County Court and was on the committee that chose the county seats of Carroll, Gibson, Haywood, and Weakley counties.

Fentress County, Tennessee was named for Fentress, as was its county seat of Jamestown. Fentress helped pass the law that created the county in 1823.
