= Milton P. Rice =

American politician (1920–2018)

Personal details
- Born: September 30, 1920 Florence, Alabama, U.S.
- Died: January 1, 2018 (aged 97) Nashville, Tennessee, U.S.
- Education: Lambuth College (B.A.); Vanderbilt University (J.D.)
- Occupation: attorney

Milton Paul Rice (September 30, 1920 – January 1, 2018) was an American politician in the state of Tennessee. He served as Attorney General of Tennessee in 1974 and as Secretary of State of Tennessee from 1989 to 1990.

== Biography ==
Rice was born in Florence, Alabama and grew up in Jackson, Mississippi, Leland, Mississippi, Camden, Tennessee and Jackson, Tennessee, where he attended public schools. He went to Jackson High School and earned a Bachelor of Arts degree from Lambuth College in 1942.

During World War II, Rice served in the United States Navy Reserve and attended the United States Naval Reserve Midshipmen's School. He became an ensign and served on the USS James O'Hara (APA-90). He served until 1946. After the war, Rice attended the Vanderbilt University School of Law to receive a juris doctor. He later worked in the Tennessee Department of Revenue and served as Assistant Attorney General of Tennessee from 1950 until 1967, when he assumed the position of Deputy Attorney General. He also was Commissioner of Insurance and Banking from 1969 to 1971.

He was a Methodist and a member of Belle Meade United Methodist Church in Nashville. He was married to Rebecca McDaniel from 1950 until her death in 1973, and to Sara Batson from 1974 until her death in 2012. Rice died in January 2018 at the age of 97.

Legal offices
Preceded by David M. Pack	Attorney General of Tennessee; 1974	Succeeded by R.A. Ashley, Jr.
Political offices
Preceded by Gentry Crowell	Secretary of State of Tennessee; 1989–1990	Succeeded by Bryant Millsaps
