= Speaker of the Tennessee Senate and Lieutenant Governor of Tennessee =

Government official in Tennessee, United States

Lieutenant Governor of Tennessee
- Speaker of the Tennessee Senate
- Seal of Tennessee

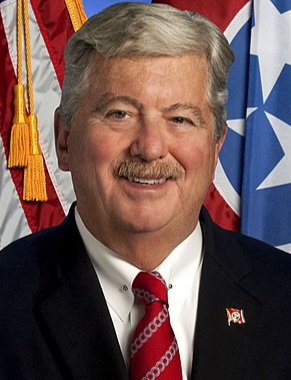
- Incumbent; Randy McNally since January 10, 2017
- Style: Mr. Speaker
- Status: Presiding officer
- Member of: Tennessee Senate
- Appointer: Tennessee Senate
- Constituting instrument: Tennessee Constitution
- Formation: February 23, 1870; 156 years ago
- First holder: Dorsey B. Thomas
- Succession: First
- Salary: $72,948 (2022)
- Website: Government website

The Speaker of the Tennessee Senate, who also serves as lieutenant governor of Tennessee, is the presiding officer of the Tennessee Senate and first in line in the succession to the office of governor of Tennessee in the event of the death, resignation, or removal from office through impeachment and conviction of the governor of Tennessee. The official title for the officeholder is Lieutenant Governor and Speaker of the Senate.

Under the Tennessee State Constitution of 1870, the speaker of the Senate is elected by the Tennessee State Senate from among its members. The lieutenant governor as a member of the Tennessee Senate has a four-year term as a senator but is subject to re-election by his peers with each new legislature; as the senators' terms are staggered by class and there could be a 50 percent turnover in membership between one legislature and the next.

The current lieutenant governor is Randy McNally, who was elected to the post on January 10, 2017, and is the second (consecutive) Republican to hold the post since Reconstruction. He succeeded Ron Ramsey, who held the post continuously from 2007 to 2017.

== Compensation ==
The job is in theory a part-time one, paying $72,948 per year; the lieutenant governor is a member of the Tennessee General Assembly (the base pay for which is $24,316 per year), which is a legislature limited to 15 organizational days and 90 legislative days with full pay and expenses in each two-year sitting.

== Line of succession ==
Since Tennessee became a state in 1796, four speakers of the Senate have succeeded to the governorship:

- William Hall, who succeeded upon the resignation of Sam Houston;
- Dewitt Clinton Senter, who succeeded William G. Brownlow, who resigned to accept election to the U.S. Senate;
- John I. Cox, who succeeded James B. Frazier, who resigned as governor after arranging his appointment to the unexpired term of U.S. Senator William B. Bate, who had died in office; and
- Henry Hollis Horton, who succeeded Austin Peay, the only governor of Tennessee to die in office as of 2026.

Under the Tennessee Constitution, in the event of succession the Speaker does not become "acting governor" or "interim governor," but assumes the title and full powers of the governorship, much as the vice president of the United States becomes president upon the death, resignation or removal from office of the president. An important distinction is that if the speaker becomes governor during the first 18 months of the governor's four-year term, a special election for the balance of the term will be held at the next U.S. general election. If the speaker becomes governor after the first 18 months of the term, the speaker will serve the entire remainder of the term. In either case, any partial term counts toward the limit of two consecutive terms. For example, if the current speaker, Randy McNally, had ascended to the governorship during the second term of Bill Haslam, he would have been eligible to run for a full term in 2018, but would have had to leave office in 2023. However, this provision has not been put into practice since the gubernatorial term was extended to four years in 1953.

The title of lieutenant governor is granted to the speaker by statutory law enacted in 1951 in recognition of the fact that the speaker is the governor's designated successor; such has been the case since the adoption of the first state constitution and Tennessee statehood in 1796.

== List of officeholders ==
President of the Council of the Southwest Territory
President	Term	Party	Life	Notes
Griffith Rutherford	1794–1796		1721–1805	The council dissolved upon the territory's admission as a state

Speakers of the Tennessee Senate, 1796–1869
Image	Name	Term	Party	Life	Notes
	James Winchester	1796–1797		1752–1826	
	James White	1797–1798		1747–1821	
	William Blount	1798–1799	Democratic-Republican	1749–1800	
	Alexander Outlaw	1799–1801		1738–1826	
	James White	1801–1805		1747–1821	
	Joseph McMinn	1805–1811	Democratic-Republican	1758–1824	
	Thomas Henderson	1811–1813	Democratic-Republican	1742 –1832	
	Robert Coleman Foster	1813–1815	Whig	1769–1844	
	Edward Ward	1815–1819		d. 1837	
	Robert Weakley	1819–1821	Democratic-Republican	1764–1845	
	Sterling Brewer	1821–1823		1770–1832	
	Robert Weakley	1823–1825	Democratic-Republican	1764–1845	
	Robert C. Foster	1825–1827	Whig	1796–1871	
	William Hall	1827–1829	Democratic	1775–1856	Became governor upon the resignation of Sam Houston
	Joel Walker	1829–1831	Whig	1789–1844	
	Burchet Douglas	1831–1833	Whig	1793–1849	
	David Burford	1833–1835	Democratic	1791–1864	
	Jonathan Webster	1835–1837	Whig	1779–1849	
	Terry H. Cahal	1837–1839	Whig	1802–1851	
	Thomas Love	1839	Democratic	1766–1844	
	Levin H. Coe	1839–1841	Democratic	1807–1850	
	Samuel Turney	1841–1843	Democratic	c. 1795–1863	
	Josiah M. Anderson	1843–1845	Whig	1807–1861	
	Harvey M. Watterson	1845–1847	Democratic	1811–1891	
	Josiah M. Anderson	1847–1849	Whig	1807–1861	
	John F. Henry	1849–1851	Whig	1808–1884	
	Munson R. Hill	1851–1853	Whig	1821–1867	
	Edwin Polk	1853–1855	Democratic	1818–1854	
	Edward S. Cheatham	1855–1857	Whig	1818–1878	
	John C. Burch	1857–1859	Democratic	1827–1881	
	Tazewell W. Newman	1859–1861	Democratic	1827–1867	
	Burton L. Stovall	1861	Democratic	1812–1879	
	Edward S. Cheatham	1861–1862	Whig	1818–1878	The state government was replaced by a military government in 1862
	Samuel R. Rodgers	1865	Unionist	1798–1866	
	Joshua B. Frierson	1865–1867	Unionist	1806–1876	
	Dewitt Clinton Senter	1867–1869	Republican	1830–1898	Became governor upon the resignation of William G. Brownlow
	Philip P.C. Nelson	1869	Republican	1828–1880	

=== 1870–present ===
The following is a list of people who have served as Lieutenant Governor of Tennessee (formal title: Lieutenant Governor and Speaker of the Senate) since the current Tennessee State Constitution was adopted in 1870. The title of Lieutenant Governor was formally added in 1951; however, the speaker of the Senate has been the designated successor to the governor of Tennessee since Tennessee achieved statehood in 1796. Lieutenant Governor Ron Ramsey (who served 2007–2017) was the first Republican to hold this office since the adoption of the current constitution, all previous ones having been Democrats.

Parties

Democratic Republican

Lieutenant governors of the State of Tennessee
No.	Image	Name	Term	Party	Governor(s) served under	Life
1		Dorsey B. Thomas	1869–1871	Democratic	None	1823–1897
2		John C. Vaughn	1871–1873	Democratic	None	1824–1875
3		A. T. Lacey	1873–1875	Democratic	None	1821–1878
4		Thomas H. Paine	1875–1877	Democratic	None	1836–1903
5		Hugh M. McAdoo	1877–1879	Democratic	None	1838–1894
6		John R. Neal	1879–1881	Democratic	None	1836–1889
7		George H. Morgan	1881–1883	Democratic	None	1841–1900
8		Benjamin F. Alexander	1883–1885	Democratic	None	1849–1911
9		Cabell R. Berry	1885–1887	Democratic	None	1848–1910
10		Z. W. Ewing	1887–1889	Democratic	None	1843–1909
11		Benjamin J. Lea	1889–1891	Democratic	None	1833–1894
12		William C. Dismukes	1891–1895	Democratic	None	1850–1903
13		Ernest Pillow	1895–1897	Democratic	None	1856–1904
14		John Thompson	1897–1899	Democratic	None	1852–1919
15		Seid Waddell	1899–1901	Democratic	None	1849–1921
16		Newton H. White	1901–1903	Democratic	None	1860–1931
17		Edward T. Seay	1903–1905	Democratic	None	1868-1941
18		John I. Cox (Note: John I. Cox became governor of Tennessee on March 21, 1905, when Governor James B. Frazier arranged his own appointment to a vacant United States Senate seat and then resigned as governor.)	1905	Democratic	None	1855–1946
19		Ernest Rice	1905–1907	Democratic	None	1872-1950
20		E. G. Tollett	1907–1909	Democratic	None	1864–1926
21		William Kinney	1909–1911	Democratic	None	1863–1940
22		Nathaniel Baxter Jr.	1911–1913	Democratic	None	1844–1913
23		Newton H. White	1913–1915	Democratic	None	1860–1931
24		Hugh C. Anderson	1915	Democratic	None	1851–1915
25		Albert E. Hill	1915–1917	Democratic	None	1870–1933
26		W. R. Crabtree	1917–1919	Democratic	None	1867–1920
27		Andrew L. Todd Sr.	1919–1921	Democratic	None	1872–1945
28		William West Bond	1921–1923	Democratic	None	1884–1975
29		Eugene J. Bryan	1923–1925	Democratic	None	1888–1958
30		Lucius D. Hill	1925–1927	Democratic	None	1856–1933
31		Henry Hollis Horton (Note: Henry H. Horton became governor of Tennessee on October 3, 1927, upon the death of Governor Austin Peay. The legislature at the time met on a biennial basis, so the position of Speaker of the Senate remained vacant until January 1929. During this period, the designated successor to the governor was Selden Maiden, Speaker of the Tennessee House of Representatives.)	1927	Democratic	None	1866–1934
32		Sam R. Bratton	1929–1931	Democratic	None	1864–1936
33		Scott P. Fitzhugh	1931	Democratic	None	1888–1956
34		Ambrose B. Broadbent	1931–1933	Democratic	None	1885–1952
35		Albert F. Officer	1933–1935	Democratic	None	1899–1965
36		William P. Moss	1935–1936	Democratic	None	1897–1985
37		Byron Pope	1936–1939	Democratic	None	1893–1973
38		Blan R. Maxwell	1939–1943	Democratic	None	1899–1943
39		Joseph H. Ballew	1943–1945	Democratic	None	1886–1972
40		Larry Morgan	1945–1947	Democratic	None	1896–1965
41		George Oliver Benton	1947–1949	Democratic	None	1915–2001
42		Walter M. Haynes	1949–1953	Democratic	Gordon Browning	1897–1967
43		Jared Maddux	1953–1959	Democratic	Frank G. Clement	1912–1971
44		William D. Baird	1959–1962	Democratic	Buford Ellington	1906–1987
45		James L. Bomar Jr.	1963–1965	Democratic	Frank G. Clement	1914–2001
46		Jared Maddux	1965–1967	Democratic	Frank G. Clement	1912–1971
47		Frank Gorrell	1967–1971	Democratic	Buford Ellington	1927–1994
48		John S. Wilder	1971–2007	Democratic	Winfield Dunn, Ray Blanton, Lamar Alexander, Ned McWherter, Don Sundquist, Phil Bredesen	1921–2010
49		Ron Ramsey	2007–2017	Republican	Phil Bredesen, Bill Haslam	b. 1955
50		Randy McNally	2017–present	Republican	Bill Haslam, Bill Lee	b. 1944
