= H. Kirk Grantham =

American athlete and coach (1896–1963)

Biographical details
- Born: May 2, 1896
- Died: October 28, 1963 (aged 67); Tupelo, Mississippi, U.S.

Playing career

Football
- 1918: Union (TN)
- 1919–1921: West Tennessee Normal

Baseball
- 1920–1921: West Tennessee Normal

Coaching career (HC unless noted)

Football
- 1925–1932: Hall-Moody / Tennessee Junior

Basketball
- 1920–1921: West Tennessee Normal
- c. 1930: Hall-Moody / Tennessee Junior

Baseball
- 1927–1931: Hall-Moody / Tennessee Junior

Homer Kirk Grantham Sr. (May 2, 1896 – October 28, 1963) was an American football, basketball and baseball player and coach.

== Early life ==
Grantham was a veteran of World War I. He attended Union University in Jackson, Tennessee and West Tennessee Normal School, now known as the University of Memphis.

== Coaching career ==
=== Memphis ===
While at West Tennessee Normal, Grantham served as the school's head men's basketball coach during the 1920–21 season.

=== UT Martin ===
During his tenure from 1925 to 1932, Grantham was the head coach football, basketball and baseball at the Hall-Moody Institute, now known as the University of Tennessee at Martin.
