= John Shelton Wilder =

American politician (1921–2010)

48th Lieutenant Governor of Tennessee Speaker of the Tennessee Senate
- In office January 7, 1971 – January 8, 2007
- Governor: Winfield Dunn; Ray Blanton; Lamar Alexander; Ned McWherter; Don Sundquist; Phil Bredesen
- Preceded by: Frank Gorrell
- Succeeded by: Ron Ramsey

Member of the Tennessee Senate from the 26th district
- In office January 3, 1959 – January 2, 1961; January 6, 1967 – January 3, 2009
- Succeeded by: Dolores Gresham

Personal details
- Born: June 3, 1921 Mason, Tennessee, U.S.
- Died: January 1, 2010 (aged 88) Memphis, Tennessee, U.S.
- Party: Democratic
- Spouse: Marcelle (died 2004)
- Children: John Shelton Wilder II, David Wilder

Military service
- Allegiance: United States
- Branch/service: United States Army
- Battles/wars: World War II

John Shelton Wilder (June 3, 1921 – January 1, 2010) was an American politician who was the 48th lieutenant governor of Tennessee for 36 years from January 1971 to January 2007, possibly the longest time anyone has served as a lieutenant governor or a similar position in the history of the United States. He was a Tennessee state senator from 1959 to 1961 and again from 1967 to 2009. Tennesseans do not elect their lieutenant governor; rather, the Speaker of the Senate, who is first in the line of succession to the governor, is granted the title by statute.

== Early life and education ==
Wilder was from Fayette County, near Memphis. He was from an affluent family with extensive agricultural and agribusiness interests. He attended Fayette County Public Schools and received an undergraduate degree from the University of Tennessee College of Agriculture and a law degree from Memphis State University, now the University of Memphis. Wilder served in the U.S. Army during World War II.

Wilder and his family were known for fairer dealings with African American farm employees and tenants than was typical of the area during the segregation era. This fact served him very well upon entering into elective politics at about the time that Black Tennesseans in rural areas were first being allowed their constitutional rights to vote, which had been guaranteed under the Tennessee and federal constitutions but were previously unenforced. Wilder was also a prominent attorney in Somerville, the county seat of Fayette County.

== Political career ==
He was a member of the former Fayette County Quarterly Court (now the County Commission) for 18 years. A Democrat, he was first elected to the Tennessee Senate in 1958, serving until January 1961.

Wilder did not run for reelection in 1960, but returned to the state Senate in 1967. After this time, a state constitutional amendment extended the length of terms in the state Senate to four years. Wilder was elected to a four-year term in 1968 and was reelected every four years thereafter until 2008. He represented Senate District 26, which currently included Chester, Crockett, Fayette, Hardeman, Hardin, Haywood, McNairy, and Wayne counties.

== Lieutenant governor ==
Wilder was elected Speaker of the State Senate by his fellow senators in January 1971, which made him the state's Lieutenant Governor. Under the Tennessee state constitution, the Speaker of the Senate is first in line of succession to the governorship. The title of Lieutenant Governor was granted to the Speaker of the Senate by statute in 1951.

He was the first Tennessee Lieutenant Governor in almost half a century, and only the second since Reconstruction, to serve under a governor of a different political party, Republican Winfield Dunn, who had been elected the previous November.

Prior to this time, the General Assembly had never had its own independent staff, or even its own offices, frequently working out of hotel rooms. Wilder now oversaw a massive building project (which somewhat ironically entailed the demolition of one of the hotels that many legislators had previously favored) which was undertaken to correct this and make the legislative branch of state government more co-equal to the other two.

Wilder defied precedent by seeking to serve as lieutenant governor for an extended period. Previously, no one had served more than three consecutive terms as Speaker of the Senate since Tennessee's current constitution was adopted in 1870. He faced little opposition until the mid-1980s. By then, many of the members of the Senate Democratic Caucus had tired of his leadership. There were also regional issues at stake – by this time the speakers of both houses of the legislature had been from West Tennessee for almost two decades. The dissident faction coalesced around the leadership of State Senate Majority Leader Riley Darnell from Clarksville in Middle Tennessee. When Darnell received the Democratic nomination for Lieutenant Governor in 1987, Wilder's long tenure as Lieutenant Governor appeared to be over.

However, in a surprise (but not entirely unprecedented) move, Wilder was then nominated by the Republican Caucus for Lieutenant Governor. With the support of all 15 Republicans in the chamber, and six dissenting Democrats, Wilder won the vote 21 – 15 and then proceeded to organize the Senate on a "bipartisan" basis, awarding a majority of the committee chairmanships to his Democratic loyalists with the remainder going to the Republicans. This was not out of character for Wilder; in 1979 he had acquiesced in the ouster of Governor Ray Blanton three days before his term was supposed to end after a series of controversial pardons. The state constitution is somewhat ambiguous on when a governor is supposed to be sworn in, so Wilder and his counterpart in the State House, Ned McWherter, supported the early swearing-in of his Republican successor, Lamar Alexander. Wilder called the move "impeachment, Tennessee style."

After this, Wilder, until 2005, continued to be reelected "unanimously" and to award chairmanships to his supporters in both parties, making the Tennessee Senate one of the few legislative bodies in the world to be elected on a partisan basis, but organized on a more-or-less nonpartisan one. Even when two outgoing state Senators switched parties in the mid-1990s, giving the Republicans a short-lived one-seat Senate majority, nothing of consequence changed.

This coalition had made Wilder one of the longest-serving (reputedly the longest) freely-elected legislative leaders in the world. Given his support among many Republican state senators, he long faced little opposition in holding onto his State Senate seat, even though the Memphis suburbs were becoming increasingly Republican. In much of his district, he was the only elected Democrat above the county level by the turn of the millennium.

Unlike many lieutenant governors, particularly in other states, Wilder never ran for governor. In 2009 he said that he had wanted to run for governor in 1974, but had been talked out of it by his family, and was "glad I stayed where I was because the Senate is the Senate."

Two Republican members of the Tennessee State Senate – enough to assure Wilder's reelection provided his traditional unanimous Democratic support in recent years – voted for Wilder on January 11, 2005, and he was sworn in for his 18th term as lieutenant governor. (One of them, Micheal Williams, was then rewarded with the post of Speaker pro Tempore.) Wilder then appointed Republican majorities to seven of the nine committees but left the five existing Democratic chairmen in place; this resulted in Democratic majorities and chairs on two committees, including what is regarded as the most important one, the Finance Committee, which left many Republicans very upset.

Following the November 2006 elections, the Republican Party retained a one-seat majority in the Tennessee Senate. However, Republicans who had supported Wilder in the past, particularly Williams, found themselves under severe pressure to adhere to party discipline, with even the threat of officially-endorsed primary opponents, unprecedented for Tennessee Republicans, for those who failed to comply with the party line. Wilder was challenged within the Democratic caucus for nomination as speaker by State Senator Joe Haynes of Nashville. Later articles in The Tennessean and the Nashville City Paper cited the possibility that all 16 Republicans might vote for Senator Ron Ramsey of Blountville and that 16 Democrats, including Wilder himself, would vote for Wilder, with Democratic State Senator Jerry Cooper, accused of wrongful business dealings with a bank controlled by Wilder, abstaining to prevent any appearance of conflict of interest. Under Senate rules, a 16–16 tie would result in Wilder's retention of the speakership.

However, in the vote held on January 9, 2007, all 17 Republicans voted for Ramsey and were joined by Democratic Senator Rosalind Kurita of Clarksville, ending Wilder's tenure as Speaker of the Senate and Lieutenant Governor of Tennessee.

On March 8, 2007, the Tennessee news media reported that Wilder had been seriously injured in a fall and was in intensive care in a hospital in Memphis. He was released from the hospital on March 11, 2007, and returned home to finish his recuperation.

In February 2008, the 2007-08 edition of the Tennessee Blue Book was dedicated to him. On March 20, 2008, Wilder announced his decision not to run for re-election later that year.

== Personal life ==
Wilder married his wife Marcelle in 1941. He was a cycling enthusiast and was a licensed private pilot for over a half-century, continuing occasionally until the end of his legislative career to fly himself 200 miles (320 km) from Fayette County to Nashville for legislative meetings.

== Death ==
Wilder died early on the morning of January 1, 2010 at Baptist Memorial Hospital in Memphis following a stroke on December 28, 2009. He was survived by his younger brother Wiggins Wilder; his two sons: Shelton (John Jr.) and David; his four grandchildren: John III, Joseph, Jarod, and Whitney; and his five great-grandchildren: Jess (John IV), Suzie, Russell, Ansel and Marcel.

Political offices
Preceded by Frank Gorrell	Lieutenant Governor of Tennessee; 1971–2007	Succeeded by Ron Ramsey
