= Joe M. Haynes =

American politician (1936–2018)

Member of the Tennessee Senate from the 20th district
- In office 1984–2012
- Succeeded by: Steven Dickerson

Joe Mann Haynes (October 8, 1936 – January 26, 2018) was a Democratic state senator from 1984 to 2012 from the 20th district, which comprises part of Davidson County.

== Biography ==
Joe M. Haynes graduated from the University of Tennessee in Knoxville with a Bachelor of Science degree in mechanical engineering, and with a J.D. from Nashville School of Law. He was a member and former chairman of the Davidson County Legislative Delegation. He was vice mayor of the City of Goodlettsville from 1986 to 1988, and commissioner from 1976 to 1978. He worked as an attorney and founded his own firm in Goodlettsville, Haynes Freeman & Bracey and was a member of the Nashville Bar Association, as well as one of its former presidents and directors. He was married to Barbara Haynes, Judge of the Third Circuit Court in Davidson County. https://www.nashvillepost.com/politics/people/article/20990456/former-sen-joe-haynes-dies

== Career ==
Haynes served as a state senator since the 94th General Assembly and was chairman of the Senate Democratic Caucus and a past chairman of the Senate Government Operations Committee. He also served on the Senate Finance, Ways, and Means Committee, the Senate State and Local Government Committee, the Senate Judiciary Committee, and the Senate Ethics Committee.

During his tenure, he served as Senate Democratic Caucus chair for 10 years. He also held positions as caucus treasurer and secretary and caucus majority whip. According to The Tennessean, when Haynes retired, "the chamber adopted a resolution honoring Haynes and calling him a 'distinguished public servant' ... [who] worked on many prominent pieces of legislation, including the 'maternity leave bill, the victim's right bill and major legislation in the areas of domestic violence, ethics reform, education, community corrections and prison funding. '"https://www.nashvillepost.com/politics/people/article/20990456/former-sen-joe-haynes-dies

In December 2006, Joe M. Haynes announced his candidacy for Speaker of the Tennessee Senate, becoming the only Democratic candidate other than John S. Wilder.

== After ==
After 28 years of public service, Haynes returned to private practice and died January 26, 2018.
