= Rocky Top (Georgia) =

Summit in the US state of Georgia

Coordinates: 34.9820046°N 84.0035654°W

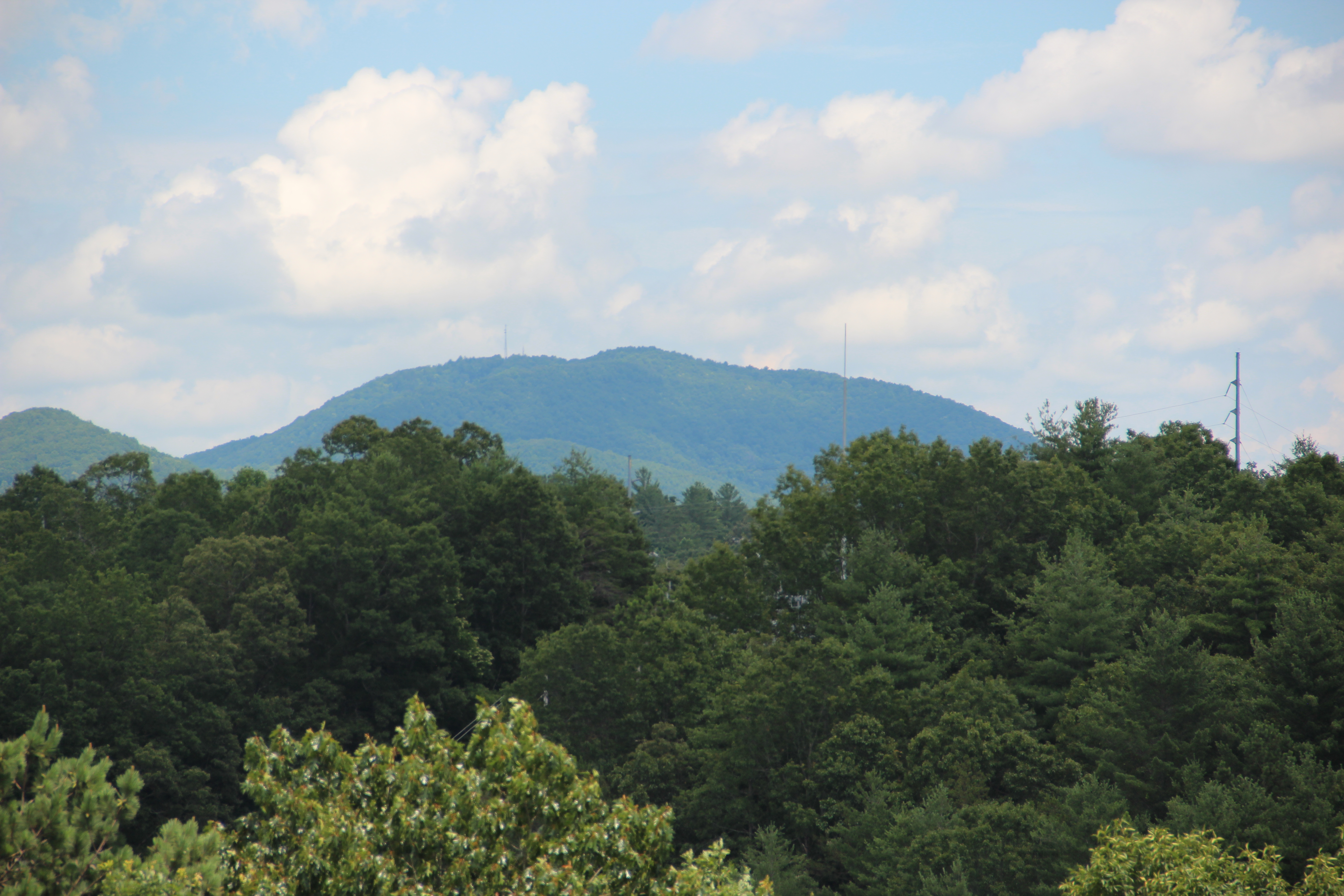
Rocky Top seen from Nottely Dam

Rocky Top is a summit in the U.S. state of Georgia. The elevation is 3,071 feet (936 m).

Rocky Top was so named on account of its appearance.
