= Tre Hargett =

American politician (born 1969)

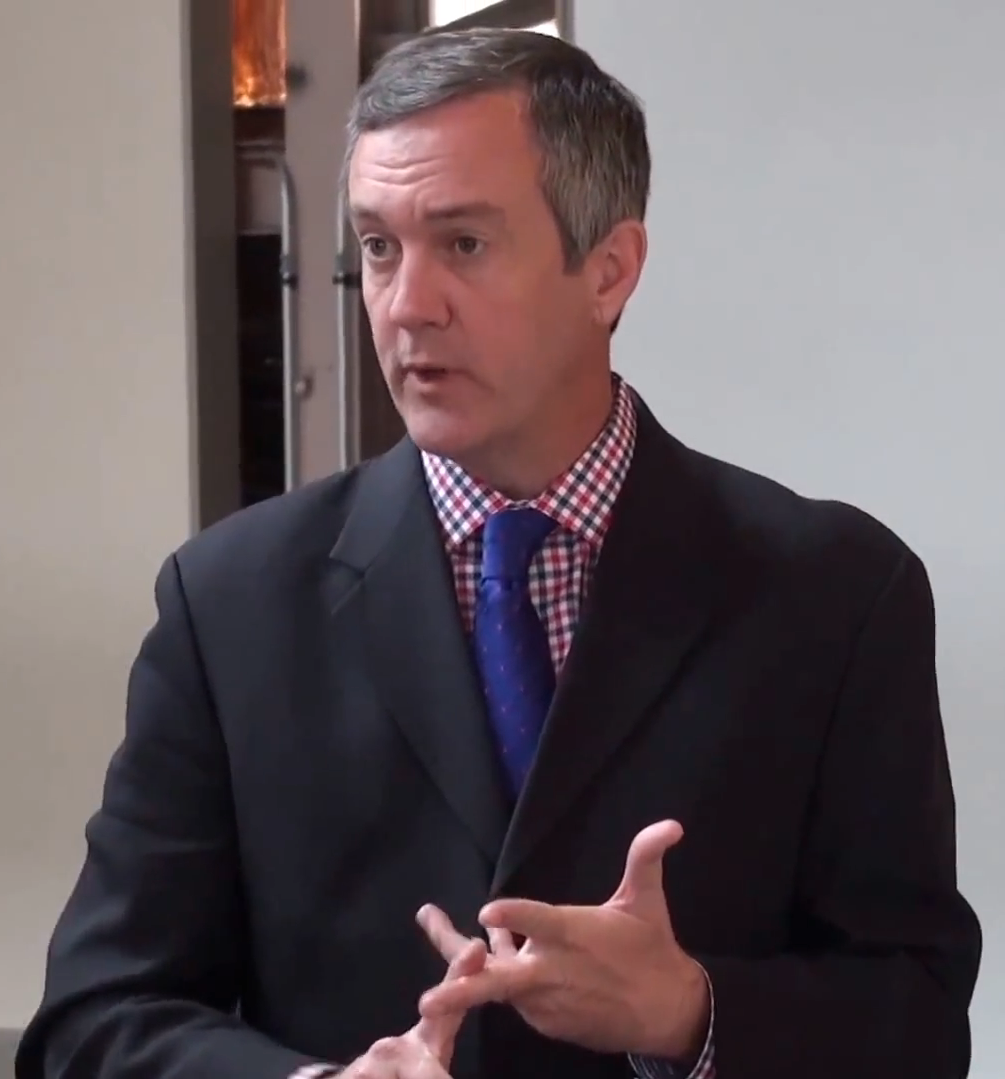
- Hargett in 2014

37th Secretary of State of Tennessee
- Incumbent
- Assumed office January 15, 2009
- Governor: Phil Bredesen; Bill Haslam; Bill Lee
- Preceded by: Riley Darnell

Chair of the Tennessee Regulatory Authority
- In office February 2008 – January 2009
- Governor: Phil Bredesen
- Preceded by: Pat Miller
- Succeeded by: Kenneth Hill

Member of the Tennessee House of Representatives from the 97th district
- In office January 14, 1997 – January 9, 2007
- Preceded by: Tim Joyce
- Succeeded by: Jim Coley

Personal details
- Born: Gus Lusk Hargett III; February 7, 1969 (age 57) Ripley, Tennessee, U.S.
- Party: Republican
- Spouse: Dawn Simbeck
- Children: 2
- Relatives: Gus L. Hargett Jr. (father)
- Education: University of Memphis (BBA, MBA)
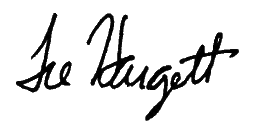
- Signature

Tre Hargett (born February 7, 1969) is an American Republican Party politician who became the 37th Secretary of State of Tennessee in 2009.

== Early life and education ==
He is the son of Gus L. Hargett Jr., a Tennessee Adjutant General and Pat Vaughan. He is a Southern Baptist. Hargett has a BBA in accounting and an MBA in marketing from the University of Memphis.

== Career before politics ==
In the private sector, Hargett worked for Rural/Metro, an emergency services provider. At the time of his appointment as TRA chairman, Hargett was serving as the corporation's Vice President for the Southern Region.

== Political career ==
Hargett served in the Tennessee House of Representatives from 1996 to 2006 representing District 97 (Bartlett and Memphis). He was twice elected Republican Leader by his colleagues.

In 2007, he was nominated to the position of Tennessee Regulatory Authority (TRA) chairman, which sets the rates and service standards of privately owned telephone, natural gas, electric and water utilities. He was confirmed by the Tennessee General Assembly and served from February 2008 through January 2009. He was succeeded by Kenneth Hill.

=== Secretary of state ===
In January 2009, the state legislature's new Republican majority voted to replace longtime Secretary of State Riley Darnell with Hargett. Hargett immediately resigned from his position as TRA chairman and took office as secretary of state on January 15, 2009.

Hargett's 'Safe at Home' Address Confidentiality program began in 2019. The program provides survivors of domestic violence, stalking, human trafficking, and sexual offenses with a substitute address to use throughout the state and local government. This resource is designed to protect survivors from discovery by their abusers or predators through public records. Participants may also use their substitute address to obtain a driver’s license and register to vote.

Hargett's partnered with several state offices in 2020 to distribute "Baby in the Back" hangtags in an effort to help reduce heat-related illnesses and deaths due to children being left in hot vehicles.

In 2020, during the COVID-19 pandemic in Tennessee, Hargett opposed allowing voters who fear catching or spreading the coronavirus to vote by mail in the 2020 elections. A state judge overruled Hargett's position, holding that Tennessee must allow vote by mail for all voters and that the restrictions on vote by mail that Hargett sought to impose were "an unreasonable burden on the fundamental right to vote guaranteed by the Tennessee Constitution."

In July of 2021, a state debate took place on whether to remove a bust of Nathan Bedford Forrest, a Confederate general, from inside the Tennessee State Capitol. Hargett voted in favor of removing the Forrest bust, as well as those of U.S. Admirals David Farragut and Albert Gleaves.

Hargett's Tennessee Businesses Against Trafficking program launched in 2024. It mobilizes businesses and their employees across Tennessee to recognize, report, and prevent human trafficking. The program includes a free, hour-long training for participating companies to help their employees identify the signs of human trafficking and take appropriate action when they spot them.

=== 2022 DUI Arrest ===
In June 2022, Hargett was arrested in Tullahoma, Tennessee, after leaving a bar after attending the Bonnaroo Music Festival, and was charged with driving under the influence. He took a "best interest" plea deal in October 2022, in which he pleaded guilty but maintained his innocence.

Political offices
Preceded by Riley Darnell	Secretary of State of Tennessee; 2009–present	Incumbent
