= Halbert Harvill =

American politician (1893–1986)

Biographical details
- Born: November 28, 1893; Hickman County, Tennessee, U.S.
- Died: December 1, 1986 (aged 93); Clarksville, Tennessee, U.S.
- Education: Middle Tennessee State

Coaching career (HC unless noted)

Basketball
- 1929–1930: Austin Peay
- 1933–1936: Austin Peay

Baseball
- 1933–1936: Austin Peay

Head coaching record
- Overall: 29–18 (basketball); 27–23 (baseball)

Halbert Harvill (November 28, 1893 – December 1, 1986) was an American university president, basketball and baseball coach, and politician. A native of Tennessee, Harvill became an educator and taught in small towns until he served in the Army during World War I. Upon his return from war, he attended Middle Tennessee State University where he graduated in 1927. Harvill moved to Murfreesboro, Tennessee to become an assistant professor of history at Austin Peay State University. After a few years, he fought in World War II, and upon his return Harvill was named the next president of Austin Peay. Harvill held the position from 1946 to 1962. During his tenure, the school grew from 417 full-time students to 2,118 and had constructed 13 new buildings. Harvill also served as the school's first ever men's basketball head coach and just their second ever baseball head coach. He coached the basketball team in 1929–30 and again from 1933 to 1936, and he coached baseball from 1933 through 1936. His overall records were 29–18 (basketball) and 27–23 (baseball).

Two years after retiring in 1962 as being Austin Peay State University's president, Harvill was convinced by a friend to run for the Tennessee Senate. At 70 years old he was elected and served for 16 years in the General Assembly's upper chambers before retiring for good. Harvill died at Memorial Hospital in Clarksville, Tennessee on December 1, 1986.

== Head coaching records ==
=== Basketball ===
Record table
Season	Team	Overall	Conference	Standing	Postseason
Austin Peay Governors (Independent) (1929–1930, 1933–1936)
1929–30	Austin Peay	7–3			
1933–34	Austin Peay	9–5			
1934–35	Austin Peay	7–7			
1935–36	Austin Peay	6–3			
Austin Peay:		29–18 (.617)			
Total:		29–18 (.617)			
National champion Postseason invitational champion Conference regular season champion Conference regular season and conference tournament champion Division regular season champion Division regular season and conference tournament champion Conference tournament champion

=== Baseball ===
Record table
Season	Team	Overall	Conference	Standing	Postseason
Austin Peay Governors (Independent) (1933–1936)
1933	Austin Peay	5–2			
1934	Austin Peay	5–9			
1935	Austin Peay	12–5			
1936	Austin Peay	5–7			
Austin Peay:		27–23 (.540)			
Total:		27–23 (.540)			
National champion Postseason invitational champion Conference regular season champion Conference regular season and conference tournament champion Division regular season champion Division regular season and conference tournament champion Conference tournament champion
