= Gus L. Hargett Jr. =

Gus Hargett
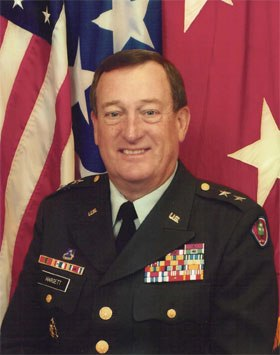

74th Adjutant General of Tennessee
- In office August 2002 – December 31, 2009
- Governor: Don Sundquist; Phil Bredesen
- Preceded by: Jackie D. Wood
- Succeeded by: Terry M. Haston

Personal details
- Born: Gus Lusk Hargett Jr.
- Spouse: Shirley Wilson
- Children: 4, including Tre
- Education: Cumberland University (BA)

Military service
- Allegiance: United States
- Branch/service: United States Army
- Years of service: 1962–2009
- Rank: Major general
- Unit: National Guard Bureau
- Commands: Tennessee National Guard
- Awards: Legion of Merit

Gus Lusk Hargett Jr. is an American retired military officer who served as Adjutant General of Tennessee.
