= McAllen Foutch =

McAllen Foutch (1909–1996) was a prominent Democratic Party politician and lawyer in Tennessee who had a long tenure in the Tennessee House of Representatives including as Speaker of the Tennessee House of Representatives.

== Early life and legal legacy ==
Born in 1909 in Tennessee, Foutch's political and personal roots were established in DeKalb County, where he maintained a lifelong affiliation with the DeKalb Democrats. He pursued a legal education that led to a successful professional career. His legal expertise was central to his public and business life, and he established a prominent law practice in Tennessee.

His early commitment to the region was permanently recognized after his death when the McAllen Foutch Scholarship was established in 1997. This scholarship honors his contributions to the community, including his instrumental role in the founding of DTC Communications, a regional company focused on infrastructure development.

== Political career ==
A dedicated Democrat, Foutch began his long political career by serving eight terms in the Tennessee House of Representatives. He was recognized as a leader within the Assembly, and was elected to the influential position of Speaker of the Tennessee House of Representatives, serving a term from 1949 to 1953. His strong political roots in DeKalb County were evident throughout his tenure, as he consistently maintained his local party affiliation.

== Later business and law career ==
Following his legislative service, Foutch remained active in both law and business. He continued to manage his private law practice, notably mentoring and employing future politicians and lawyers, including Tommy Buck and Frank Buck, before they established their own firms. Beyond his legal work, Foutch was a key figure in the regional business community, serving as vice-president for WJLE broadcasting in Smithville and as chairman of the board for Citizens Bank. Foutch also played an instrumental role in founding DTC Communications, a regional company dedicated to developing communication infrastructure.

== Personal life and legacy ==
He lived in Smithville, Tennessee, and was a member of a Missionary Baptist church. He was married to Sallie Parker Foutch, and together they had four daughters. After his death, his enduring commitment to the region was honored when the McAllen Foutch Scholarship was established in 1997, recognizing his contributions to the community and his role with DTC Communications.
