= Andrew L. Todd Sr. =

American lawyer and politician (1872–1945)

Andrew Lee Todd, Sr.
- Todd in 1921

Tennessee General Assembly Member
- In office c. 1913 – c. 1923

Tennessee House of Representatives Member
- In office c. 1913 – c. 1923

Tennessee State Senate Member
- In office c. 1913 – c. 1923

State Board of Education Member
- In office 1905–1915
- Appointed by: James B. Frazier

Rutherford County Superintendent of Schools
- In office 1900–1907

Personal details
- Born: July 27, 1872 Rucker, Rutherford County, Tennessee, USA
- Died: March 24, 1945 (aged 72)
- Party: Democratic
- Spouse: Minneola Wilson (m. 1895)
- Children: 2
- Education: Union University; Cumberland School of Law

Andrew Lee Todd Sr. (July 27, 1872 – March 24, 1945) was an American lawyer, educator and Democratic member of the Tennessee General Assembly.

== Early life ==
Todd was born in the Rucker community of Rutherford County, Tennessee, to a local farmer, Aaron Wilson Todd, and his wife, Elizabeth (Prater) Todd, on July 27, 1872.

He married his wife, Minneola Wilson, on July 3, 1895. They had two sons.

He graduated from Union University (formerly Southwestern Baptist University) in Jackson, Tennessee, in 1892, and was selected to become a member of the faculty. He taught at the university until June 1895. After marrying Minneola, he served as the principal of Wartrace high school as well as the Lexington Baptist College. He took a law course at Sewanee, and later at Cumberland University Law School. He graduated from Cumberland in 1901.

In addition to being a charter member of the Murfreesboro Rotary Club in 1919, Todd held memberships in the Masons, the Knights of Pythias, Odd Fellows, and Kappa Sigma fraternity, as well as the Baptist church. He served as an alternate delegate for Tennessee at the Democratic National Convention in 1924.

== Career ==
He was elected as Rutherford County Superintendent of Schools from 1900 to 1907 and Governor Frazier appointed him to the State Board of Education in 1905 where he continued to serve until 1915. As a member of the Board of Education he lobbied to locate the state's new teacher's college to Murfreesboro. The "Middle Tennessee State Teachers College" evolved into the present day Middle Tennessee State University.

From 1913 to 1923, Todd served in the Tennessee General Assembly, two terms in the House and two terms in the Senate. As Speaker of the Senate in the 61st General Assembly, and Speaker of the House in the 62nd General Assembly (1921–1923), he was the first person in Tennessee history to have served in both capacities. His accomplishment was later repeated by Walter M. Haynes, who served as Speaker of the House in the 67th, 69th and 70th General Assemblies and then as Speaker of the Senate in the 76th and 77th General Assemblies.

Apart from his political career, Todd was also an active businessman. He established the 800 acres (320 ha) "Toddington Farms" which specialized in pure-bred Aberdeen-Angus cattle. He often made large purchases of cattle.

He practiced as an attorney in Murfreesboro for many years and developed many business interests there, including the Murfreesboro Home Journal (owner), the Murfreesboro Bank & Trust Co. (president, 1913–1929), and Murfreesboro Woolen Mills (shareholder). He was a financial correspondent for the Union Central Life Insurance Company and a farm loan correspondent for the New York Life Insurance Company. He purchased another local paper alongside the Murfreesboro Home Journal and merged them into The Daily News Journal.

=== Ratification of the 19th Amendment ===
Todd was Speaker of the Senate in 1920, when women's suffrage came up for the vote for ratification in Tennessee. Todd did vote in favor of the measure to support the amendment for women's suffrage, and the resolution passed the state Senate with a vote of 25 to 4 with 2 abstentions.

== Legacy ==
Todd is sometimes referred to as the "godfather" of Middle Tennessee State University and he continued to support the school until his death. In 1958, a new library was constructed at a cost of $450,000. It was named the Andrew L Todd Library in his honor.

During the late 1930s, Todd was involved with the construction of a dam across "Black Fox Camp Spring Creek", the resulting reservoir is now known as "Todd's Lake."

He also attempted to establish the M. Davis Memorial Association August 21, 1920, alongside Eugene Holloway and George H. Armistead, to acquire the homestead of Sam Davis and his place of execution at Pulaski, Tennessee to establish "shrines."
