= Operation Rocky Top =

1986 FBI investigation

- Operation name: Operation Rocky Top
- Type: corruption crackdown

Participants
- Initiated by: TBI; FBI
- Executed by: TBI; FBI

Mission
- Objective: To crack down on local government corruption.

Timeline
- Date begin: 1986
- Date end: 1989

Results
- Arrests: 50+

Operation Rocky Top was an investigation by the Federal Bureau of Investigation into political corruption in the Tennessee state government in the late 1980s.

== Code name ==
The code name for the investigation was derived from "Rocky Top", one of the state's official songs. Years later, another investigation of Tennessee public corruption was code-named Operation Tennessee Waltz, after another state song.

== Investigation ==
Operation Rocky Top was launched in 1986 as an FBI and Tennessee Bureau of Investigation undercover investigation into illegal activities in charity bingo, including the illegal sale of bingo licenses.

A first-year member of the Tennessee House of Representatives, Randy McNally of Oak Ridge, became a secret participant in the investigation in 1986 after he reported to authorities that a bingo lobbyist had offered him bribes and had boasted about bribing other lawmakers. For the duration of the investigation McNally wore a wire and cultivated the trust of bingo lobbyists and other insiders so they would talk freely in front of him and offer him bribes. Ned McWherter, who was Speaker of the Tennessee House when the investigation began and who was elected Governor of Tennessee in 1986, also was praised by federal officials for cooperating with the investigation.

== Results ==
Operation Rocky Top became public in January 1989 when W.D. "Donnie" Walker, a one-time bingo regulator in the state government who later became a lobbyist, pleaded guilty to offering McNally a $10,000 (equivalent to $29,372 in 2025) bribe in exchange for his vote on a measure to legalize horse racing. In exchange for a plea bargain, Walker gave investigators details on how he had helped bingo operators become chartered as bogus charities so they could obtain state licenses to run bingo games, and how bingo operators then channeled money back to state legislators who were part of the scheme. At the height of activity there were nearly 300 bingo operations in the state with estimated annual revenue of $31 million.

The investigation resulted in more than 50 convictions and the incarceration of several politicians, most notably Tennessee House of Representatives' majority leader, Democrat Tommy Burnett.

Two other targets of the investigation committed suicide before testifying, Tennessee Secretary of State Gentry Crowell, in December 1989, just before he was scheduled to testify for a third time before a federal grand jury, and State Representative Ted Ray Miller of Knoxville, after being charged with bribery. Following the scandal, Tennessee established limits on political contributions and placed new restrictions on lobbying.

== Sources ==
- Sandra Roberts, Before Tennessee Waltz, there was Rocky Top, The Tennessean, June 5, 2005.
