= Austin Peay State University =

Public university in Clarksville, Tennessee, U.S.

Coordinates: 36.53230°N 87.35457°W

- Former names: Austin Peay Normal School (1927–1943); Austin Peay State College (1943–1967)
- Type: Public university
- Established: 1927; 99 years ago
- Academic affiliations: Space-grant
- Endowment: $79.3 million
- President: Michael J. Licari
- Academic staff: 550
- Administrative staff: 629
- Students: 9,945
- Undergraduates: 8,587
- Postgraduates: 1,358
- Location: Clarksville, Tennessee, United States
- Campus: Urban, 182 acres (0.74 km^{2})
- Colors: Red and white
- Sporting affiliations: NCAA Division I – ASUN; UAC
- Mascot: Governors
- Website: www.apsu.edu

Austin Peay State University (APSU; /piː/) is a public university in Clarksville, Tennessee, United States. Standing on a site occupied by a succession of educational institutions since 1845, the precursor of the university was established in 1927 and named for then-sitting Governor Austin Peay, who is further honored with "Governors", the name of the university's athletic teams. Affiliated with the Tennessee Board of Regents, it is now governed by the Austin Peay State University Board of Trustees as of May 2017. The university is accredited by the Southern Association of Colleges and Schools (SACS) and, in 2012, was the fastest-growing university in Tennessee. In 2025, Austin Peay State University hit 11,185 registered students for the fall semester.

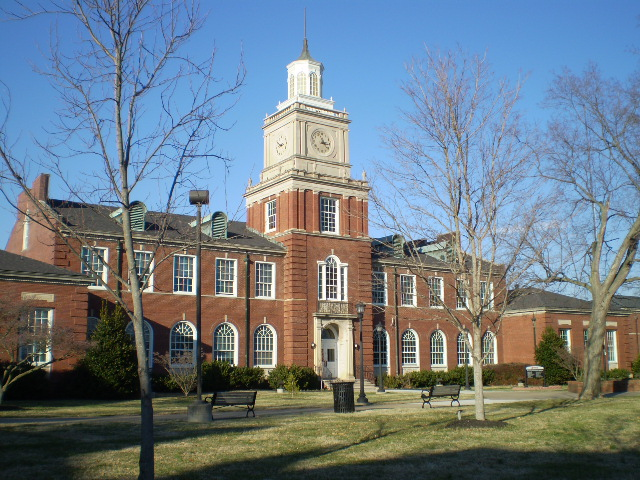
The Browning Building at Austin Peay State University

== History ==
Austin Peay Normal School, the precursor of the university, was established in 1927 and named for then-sitting Tennessee Governor Austin Peay. In 1943, its name was changed to Austin Peay State College. It became Austin Peay State University in 1967.

In 2025, APSU fired a professor of theatre for a social media post following the death of Charlie Kirk which consisted of a screenshot of a 2023 Newsweek headline quoting Kirk's prior views on deaths due to gun violence. The professor sued the university and was reinstated the next year with APSU also forced to pay him $500,000.

=== Presidents ===
- Philander Claxton, 1930–1946
- Halbert Harvill, 1946–1962
- Joe Morgan, 1963–1976
- Sherry Hoppe, 2001–2007
- Tim Hall, 2008–2013
- Alisa White, 2014–2020
- Michael Licari, 2021–Present

== Academics ==
Austin Peay is organized into six colleges, two schools, and 28 departments.

- College of Arts and Letters
- College of Business
- College of Behavioral and Health Sciences
- Eriksson College of Education
- College of Science, Technology, Engineering & Mathematics
- College of Graduate Studies

== Demographics ==
Undergraduate demographics as of Fall 2023
Race and ethnicity	Total
White	52%
Black	22%
Hispanic	11%
Two or more races	6%
Unknown	5%
Asian	2%
International student	1%
Economic diversity
Low-income (Note: The percentage of students who received an income-based federal Pell grant intended for low-income students.)	52%
Affluent (Note: The percentage of students who are a part of the American middle class at the bare minimum.)	48%

== Campus ==
The university's campus in Clarksville, Tennessee, is a site occupied by a succession of educational institutions since 1845. The urban setting includes 182 acres (74 ha). Built before Austin Peay Normal School, the Castle Building was an impressive three-story brick structure that featured fretted battlements, towers, casement windows set in paneled wood.

== Athletics ==
The university's colors are red and white. Its athletics teams are called the Governors, in honor of Governor Austin Peay. The university is a member of the ASUN Conference and competes at the NCAA Division 1.
