= Tennessee House of Representatives 42nd district =

State legislative district in Tennessee

Tennessee's 42nd State House of Representatives district
- Map of Tennessee House districts with the 42nd District shaded in red
Representative
Ryan Williams; R–Cookeville
since 2011
- Demographics: 84.4% White; 2.6% Black; 8.4% Hispanic; 2.6% Asian; 3% Multiracial
- Population (2024): 74,993

The Tennessee House of Representatives 42nd district is one of the 99 legislative districts in the lower house of the Tennessee General Assembly. The district is located in Middle Tennessee and covers the western half of Putnam County. The main settlement in the area is Cookeville, others include Baxter, and Algood, the rest of the district is unincorporated. Ryan Williams has represented the district since 2011.

== Demographics ==
The Tennessee Comptroller estimates the population as of 2024 at 74,993.

- 84.4% of the district is White
- 8.4% of the district is Hispanic
- 2.6% of the district is African American
- 1.3% of the district is Asian
- 3% of the district is Two or more races

Detailed demographic information is also available through Census Reporter.

== History ==
The 88th Tennessee General Assembly was the first in which all districts were numbered. At this time, the 42nd district was made up of Cumberland and Putnam Counties. Prior to this there was a floterial district that included Jackson and Putnam counties. From the 93rd GA, it has been part or all of Putnam County.

== List of Representatives ==
Representative	Party	Years of Service	General Assembly	Hometown
Ryan Williams	Republican	2011 – present	107th-114th	Byrdstown
Henry Fincher	Democratic	2007 – 2010	105th-106th	Cookeville
Jere Hargrove	Democratic	1991 – 2006	97th-104th	Cookeville
Dwight Henry	Republican	1989 – 1990	96th	Cookeville
Jerry Jared	Democratic	1979 – 1988	91st-95th	Cookeville
Tommy Burks	Democratic	1971 – 1978	87th-90th	Monterey
