= 1990 United States Senate election in Tennessee =

- November 6, 1990
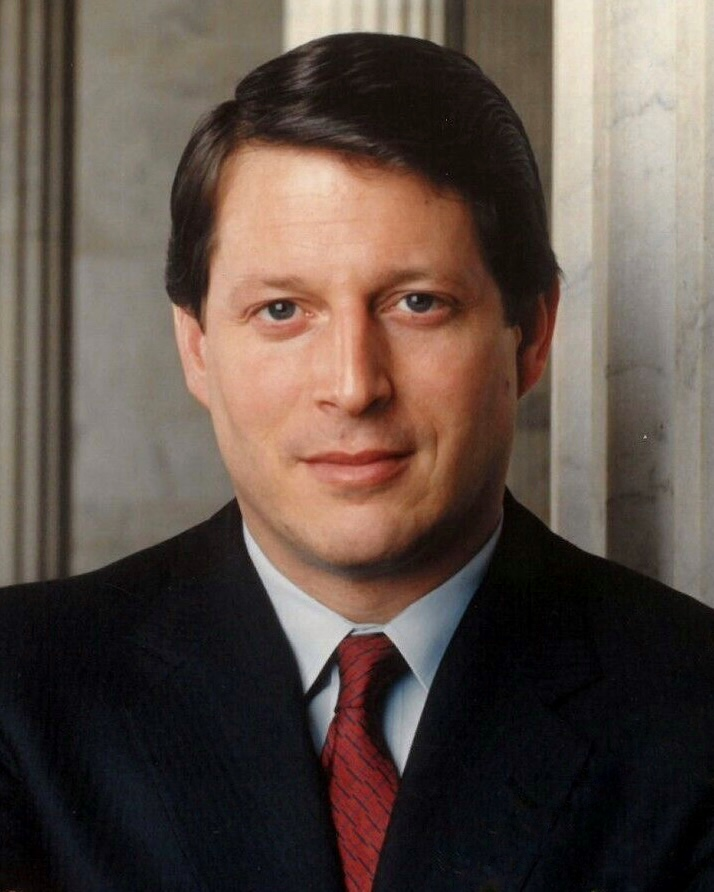

Nominee	Al Gore	William R. Hawkins
Party	Democratic	Republican
Popular vote	530,898	233,703
Percentage	67.73%	29.81%
- County results Gore: 50–60% 60–70% 70–80% 80–90%
U.S. senator before election
Al Gore
Democratic
Elected U.S. Senator
Al Gore
Democratic

The 1990 United States Senate election in Tennessee was held on November 6, 1990, to select the U.S. senator from the state of Tennessee. Incumbent Senator Al Gore of the Democratic Party defeated challenger William R. Hawkins of the Republican Party, winning a second term. The election had a turnout rate of just over 20% of registered voters. Gore won in a landslide with over 67% of the vote, improving on his 1984 margin and winning all of the state's counties.

Hawkins's campaign was poorly funded and relatively unknown, compared to Gore, who was incredibly popular within the state and began the race with over a million dollars in campaign funds. Gore was expected to easily win re-election, and the election cycle was labeled "boring". Issues for the campaign included fiscal responsibility and Gore's liberal voting record. As of 2026, this was the last time the Democrats won a U.S. Senate election in Tennessee, and the last Tennessee U.S. Senate race in which any candidate won every county.

== Background ==
In 1984, despite Ronald Reagan's landslide victory in the concurrent presidential election, Al Gore flipped an open Senate seat held by retiring Republican Howard Baker, defeating Republican Victor Ashe with a little over 60% of the vote. By contrast, Reagan won Tennessee in the presidential election with 58% of the vote to 42% for Democratic candidate Walter Mondale.

The 1990 election was held as part of the midterm election cycle of Republican President George H. W. Bush's term. Historically, the president's party struggles during the midterms. Gore was one of several politicians who were seen as likely candidates for the 1992 Democratic presidential nomination up for reelection.

== Candidates and primaries ==
- Al Gore (Democrat), incumbent Senator
- William R. Hawkins (Republican), conservative author

Primary elections were held on August 2, 1990. Just under 25% of Tennessee's 2.5 million registered voters voted in the primary elections. State elections coordinator Will Burns said the turnout rate was "pretty dismal".

=== Democratic primary ===
- Al Gore, incumbent Senator

After winning his first term in a landslide victory, Gore decided to run for a second. He was unopposed in the Democratic primary. Writing for The Commercial Appeal, Terry Keeter credited the lack of competition to the margin of Gore's victory in the 1984 senate election. Gore received almost 480,000 votes, with 54 votes cast for write-in candidates.

1990 United States Senate election in Tennessee Democratic primary
Party	Candidate	Votes	%
Democratic	Al Gore (incumbent)	479,961	99.99%
Write-in		54	0.01%
Total votes		480,015	100.00%

=== Republican primary ===
- Ralph H. Brown, retiree with no political experience
- Patrick K. Hales, unsuccessful candidate for the Tennessee Public Service Commission in 1986
- William R. Hawkins, conservative author

Former Governor Lamar Alexander, who was very popular in the state, was seen as the only person who could successfully oust Gore. However, he declined to run in favor of being president of the University of Tennessee. Hawkins ran after being approached by the Tennessee Conservative Union. He felt that Gore was "the most liberal Senator from the south" and did not properly represent the views of Tennesseans. He described similarities between the voting records of Gore and his father, Albert Gore Sr., noting that Gore Sr. had lost reelection. Hawkins' primary had a total budget of $3,000. Brown felt that even if he won the nomination he would not be able to defeat Gore in the general election. Despite this he felt it would give him a platform to publicize his beliefs. Hales ran because he felt Gore was "out of touch" with his fellow Tennesseans. After the primary, Hales said he was advised against running.

Despite Gore being expected to easily win the general election, the primary was very closely contested. Hawkins defeated Brown by a very narrow margin, though both received over 20,000 more votes than Hale.

Twelve years later, Alexander would win Gore's seat in 2002

1990 United States Senate election in Tennessee Republican primary
Party	Candidate	Votes	%
Republican	William R. Hawkins	54,317	38.86%
Republican	Ralph Brown	53,873	38.54%
Republican	Patrick K. Hales	31,515	22.55%
Write-in		70	0.05%
Total votes		139,775	100.00%

== General election ==
Hawkins's campaign was poorly funded; he only had $3,000 to fund his primary run, while Gore had begun the campaign with around $1,000,000. Two weeks before election day Hawkins had raised $12,000 to Gore's $2,000,000. Hawkins' campaign ended with zero cash on hand while Gore had just over $700,000 left.

Hawkins stated that he wanted to run the most "issue-orientated campaign Tennessee has ever seen." He criticized Gore's liberal views, including his stance on the death penalty and his support for the Civil Rights Act of 1990. Despite Gore being more pro-military than most Democrats, Hawkins criticized him for being "soft on defense". Hawkins noted that the federal deficit had increased under policy's that Gore had voted for. He stated that if elected he would work to cut taxes and reduce government spending.

The staff of The Jackson Sun characterized Tennessee's election cycle as boring, noting the likelihood of Gore and incumbent Governor Ned McWherter being reelected, writing, "the gubernatorial and senatorial races are a yawn". Republican Representative Don Sundquist felt that the Hawkins was a weak candidate and that Republicans would likely have a better chance of taking the seat in the 1996 election.

On October 29, 1990, roughly two weeks before election day, Hawkins admitted that his campaign "failed to generate excitement" and acknowledged the relative obscurity of his campaign even within Republican groups. However, the staff of The Commercial Appeal noted that Gore would have some difficulty with his bid due to the conservative lean of Tennessee and his liberal voting record.

Gore was unable to make in person campaign visits for much of the race due to his role in Congress. The campaign ran a single sixty second television advertisement. In the final few days of the campaign, Gore visited several locations in Memphis, Tennessee and ran a half hour long television special in all major markets throughout the state. Gore's press secretary said the special cost around $20,000-$30,000 and was produced by the firm Squier-Eskew-Knapp advertising firm. On the contrary, Hawkins canceled his planned statewide press conferences and was unable to air radio ads he had recorded due to budgetary constraints. Hawkins had planned to host a fundraising dinner, however he had to cancel the dinner after the organizer of the event died.

=== Results ===
The election was held on November 6, 1990. Gore, like most incumbents in the 1990 United States Senate elections, was reelected to another term. He won in a landslide, receiving over 67 percent of the vote, an improvement on his previous margin of victory. Independent candidates Charles Gordon Vick and Bill Jacox both received around 1% of the vote each. A total of 109 votes were cast for write-in candidates. The election had a turnout rate of slightly over 20% of registered voters casting ballots, a similar level to the concurrent gubernatorial election. Low voter turnout was projected due to the lack of major opposition in the Senate and Gubernatorial elections. However, the turnout rate was higher than expected.

Gore won all 95 of the state's counties. His best performance was in Trousdale County, where he won 88 percent of the vote to Hawkins' 10 percent. Hawkins' best performance was in Monroe County where he won around 40 percent of the vote to Gore's 57 percent. Gore over performed McWherter's margin in the gubernatorial race by around seven percent, although he received a lower number of votes. Hawkins under performed Republican gubernatorial candidate Dwight Henry.

1990 United States Senate election in Tennessee
Party	Candidate	Votes	%
Democratic	Al Gore (incumbent)	530,898	67.73%
Republican	William R. Hawkins	233,703	29.81%
Independent	Bill Jacox	11,172	1.43%
Independent	Charles Gordon Vick	7,995	1.02%
Write-in		109	0.01%
Total votes		783,877	100.00%
Democratic hold			

=== By county ===
County	Albert Gore, Jr. Democratic		William Hawkins Republican		Others Independent		Total votes
County	%	#	%	#	%	#	Total votes
Anderson	69.1%	9,542	29.1%	4,018	1.8%	241	13,801
Bedford	77.1%	2,259	21.2%	621	1.7%	50	2,930
Benton	76.6%	1,735	19.5%	441	3.9%	88	2,264
Bledsoe	61.5%	1,229	36.8%	734	1.8%	34	1,997
Blount	59.8%	7,563	38.0%	4,803	2.2%	278	12,644
Bradley	56.8%	4,942	40.6%	3,533	2.6%	225	8,700
Campbell	72.8%	3,527	25.9%	1,253	1.3%	65	4,845
Cannon	73.5%	992	23.4%	316	3.1%	41	1,349
Carroll	75.3%	3,306	22.7%	998	1.9%	85	4,389
Carter	61.0%	3,431	36.3%	2,042	2.7%	148	5,621
Cheatham	71.1%	1,818	26.3%	672	2.7%	67	2,557
Chester	65.2%	1,468	33.7%	758	1.2%	25	2,251
Claiborne	71.6%	2,486	27.0%	938	1.4%	49	3,473
Clay	75.2%	711	23.2%	219	1.6%	15	945
Cocke	66.3%	1,996	30.4%	914	3.3%	99	3,009
Coffee	64.9%	3,994	32.7%	2,013	2.4%	149	6,156
Crockett	69.7%	1,361	27.4%	535	2.9%	56	1,952
Cumberland	57.6%	3,680	39.3%	2,513	3.1%	197	6,390
Davidson	72.0%	54,267	25.2%	19,008	2.7%	2,054	75,329
Decatur	69.0%	1,200	29.3%	509	1.6%	29	1,738
DeKalb	74.1%	1,342	23.2%	421	2.7%	49	1,812
Dickson	75.5%	3,740	22.8%	1,127	1.7%	86	4,953
Dyer	69.3%	3,536	26.9%	1,374	3.8%	189	5,099
Fayette	65.2%	2,378	31.2%	1,137	3.6%	130	3,645
Fentress	72.3%	1,446	26.0%	519	1.8%	34	1,999
Franklin	75.4%	3,971	23.0%	1,210	1.7%	88	5,269
Gibson	79.1%	6,972	19.0%	1,671	1.9%	167	8,810
Giles	79.6%	2,558	18.9%	608	1.5%	46	3,212
Grainger	58.7%	936	39.2%	625	2.1%	34	1,595
Greene	59.4%	3,511	38.6%	2,283	2.0%	116	5,910
Grundy	77.4%	1,251	21.3%	344	1.3%	21	1,616
Hamblen	61.7%	4,792	36.6%	2,842	1.8%	137	7,771
Hamilton	56.4%	28,928	40.3%	20,671	3.3%	1,714	51,313
Hancock	70.8%	651	28.3%	260	1.0%	9	920
Hardeman	77.0%	3,873	20.6%	1,034	2.4%	120	5,027
Hardin	69.8%	3,343	28.7%	1,374	1.5%	71	4,788
Hawkins	68.1%	4,943	30.8%	2,239	1.1%	81	7,263
Haywood	72.8%	1,685	24.6%	568	2.6%	60	2,313
Henderson	61.1%	1,857	37.5%	1,141	1.4%	42	3,040
Henry	74.3%	2,756	23.4%	868	2.3%	86	3,710
Hickman	79.3%	1,741	19.2%	421	1.5%	33	2,195
Houston	82.2%	1,017	15.0%	185	2.8%	35	1,237
Humphreys	78.2%	1,605	19.1%	393	2.7%	55	2,053
Jackson	83.2%	1,243	15.5%	231	1.3%	20	1,494
Jefferson	60.3%	2,454	37.0%	1,504	2.7%	109	4,067
Johnson	63.3%	1,027	34.6%	561	2.1%	34	1,622
Knox	65.4%	37,254	32.8%	18,675	1.8%	1,018	56,947
Lake	78.5%	486	18.3%	113	3.2%	20	619
Lauderdale	72.7%	1,748	24.7%	593	2.7%	64	2,405
Lawrence	73.0%	5,198	26.2%	1,862	0.8%	58	7,118
Lewis	79.9%	1,704	18.9%	404	1.1%	24	2,132
Lincoln	75.9%	2,743	22.3%	807	1.7%	62	3,612
Loudon	58.2%	2,479	38.9%	1,655	2.9%	125	4,259
Macon	71.2%	1,030	27.1%	392	1.7%	24	1,446
Madison	73.3%	13,500	24.4%	4,499	2.2%	413	18,412
Marion	71.0%	3,743	26.5%	1,399	2.5%	131	5,273
Marshall	70.4%	1,629	26.9%	623	2.6%	61	2,313
Maury	68.2%	5,289	30.1%	2,332	1.7%	133	7,754
McMinn	62.8%	5,442	35.4%	3,065	1.8%	156	8,663
McNairy	68.1%	3,622	31.1%	1,654	0.9%	46	5,322
Meigs	61.0%	900	37.7%	556	1.4%	20	1,476
Monroe	57.8%	2,715	40.9%	1,922	1.3%	60	4,697
Montgomery	78.8%	11,567	19.5%	2,864	1.7%	255	14,686
Moore	73.7%	465	24.7%	156	1.6%	10	631
Morgan	74.4%	1,457	23.3%	457	2.3%	45	1,959
Obion	76.9%	3,210	20.5%	858	2.6%	108	4,176
Overton	83.2%	1,761	15.0%	317	1.8%	39	2,117
Perry	79.0%	762	20.1%	194	0.9%	9	965
Pickett	65.1%	506	33.7%	262	1.2%	9	777
Polk	69.7%	1,485	28.9%	615	1.4%	30	2,130
Putnam	75.1%	6,663	22.9%	2,032	2.0%	180	8,875
Rhea	60.8%	3,124	38.0%	1,954	1.2%	60	5,138
Roane	69.7%	7,583	28.2%	3,069	2.1%	230	10,882
Robertson	78.0%	3,602	19.1%	883	2.9%	134	4,619
Rutherford	70.6%	10,184	26.8%	3,860	2.6%	371	14,415
Scott	67.0%	1,021	30.5%	465	2.4%	37	1,523
Sequatchie	64.0%	996	34.6%	538	1.4%	22	1,556
Sevier	58.6%	3,278	38.6%	2,158	2.8%	158	5,594
Shelby	64.3%	98,841	32.4%	49,860	3.3%	5,122	153,823
Smith	84.0%	1,996	14.4%	341	1.6%	39	2,376
Stewart	76.2%	1,247	20.6%	337	3.2%	53	1,637
Sullivan	65.3%	14,871	32.5%	7,398	2.3%	521	22,790
Sumner	73.2%	10,376	25.0%	3,539	1.9%	264	14,179
Tipton	59.1%	2,375	36.4%	1,465	4.5%	181	4,021
Trousdale	88.7%	1,867	10.3%	216	1.0%	21	2,104
Unicoi	70.0%	1,395	28.5%	567	1.5%	30	1,992
Union	61.5%	1,054	36.7%	629	1.7%	30	1,713
Van Buren	84.7%	728	14.4%	124	0.9%	8	860
Warren	81.8%	5,837	15.6%	1,117	2.6%	186	7,140
Washington	71.4%	10,730	26.4%	3,973	2.2%	334	15,037
Wayne	57.7%	896	40.7%	632	1.5%	24	1,552
Weakley	78.0%	4,290	19.5%	1,072	2.5%	136	5,498
White	77.4%	1,818	19.5%	459	3.1%	72	2,349
Williamson	61.2%	8,664	36.6%	5,189	2.2%	314	14,167
Wilson	77.6%	11,704	20.6%	3,103	1.8%	268	15,075
Total	67.7%	530,898	29.8%	233,703	2.5%	19,276	783,877

== Aftermath ==
On January 3, 1991, Gore was sworn in to the 102nd United States Congress by then-Vice President Dan Quayle alongside his fellow senators-elect. After being elected vice president in the 1992 presidential election, Gore resigned from his Senate seat on January 2, 1993. Harlan Mathews was appointed to replace him by Governor Ned McWherter. In the 1994 special election for the seat, the remainder of Gore's term was won by Republican Fred Thompson, who defeated Democratic Representative Jim Cooper for Tennessee's 4th congressional district.

As of the 2024 election cycle, this was the last time the Democrats won a Senate election in Tennessee. It is the most recent Senate election in Tennessee in which several counties, including Knox County and Hamilton County, voted for the Democratic candidate. Since the 1994 elections, the Democratic party has struggled in the state.
