= 1990 Tennessee gubernatorial election =

- November 6, 1990
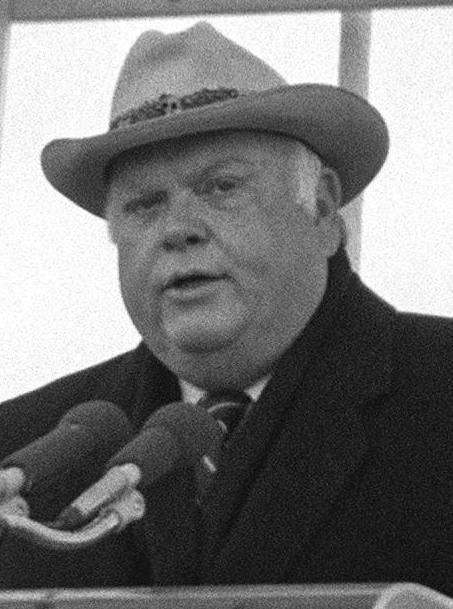

Nominee	Ned McWherter	Dwight Henry
Party	Democratic	Republican
Popular vote	479,990	288,904
Percentage	60.83%	36.61%
- County results McWherter: 40–50% 50–60% 60–70% 70–80% 80–90% Henry: 40–50% 50–60% Tie: 40–50%
Governor before election
Ned McWherter
Democratic
Elected Governor
Ned McWherter
Democratic

The 1990 Tennessee gubernatorial election took place on November 6, 1990, to elect the governor of Tennessee. Incumbent Democratic governor Ned McWherter was re-elected, defeating his Republican opponent Dwight Henry, a one term member of the Tennessee House of Representatives. McWherter received 60.8% of the vote.

== Aftermath ==
A tax study commission appointed during Ned McWherter's first term reported at the beginning of his second, recommending a state income tax be implemented. An income tax has long been considered the third rail of Tennessee politics. McWherter gave the idea lukewarm support at first, but the idea was eventually dropped entirely, not to resurface again during his time as governor.

In 1990, McWherter was invited to speak at a chapel service at Freed-Hardeman University in Henderson, Tennessee at the request of his lifelong friend, E. Claude Gardner, then president of the university. In 1992, Senator Al Gore was elected vice president, thus creating a vacancy in the Senate. McWherter appointed his deputy governor, Harlan Matthews, to serve as U.S. Senator until the 1994 election. In 1994, McWherter was named the nation's most outstanding governor by Governing magazine.

== General election ==
Tennessee gubernatorial election, 1990
Party	Candidate	Votes	%	±%
Democratic	Ned McWherter (incumbent)	479,990	60.83%	+6.57%
Republican	Dwight Henry	288,904	36.61%	−9.13%
Independent	W. Curtis Jacox	10,980	1.39%	N/A
Independent	David Brandon Shepard	9,094	1.15%	N/A
N/A	Write-ins	100	0.01%	N/A
Total votes		789,068	100.00%	
Democratic hold		Swing		

== See also ==
- 1990 United States House of Representatives elections in Tennessee
- 1990 United States Senate election in Tennessee
