= Senator Burks =

Senator Burks may refer to:

- Charlotte Burks (born 1942), Tennessee State Senate
- Tommy Burks (1940–1998), Tennessee State Senate
