= Steve Adams (politician) =

Former state treasurer of Tennessee, US

39th Tennessee State Treasurer
- In office January 1987 – October 24, 2003
- Governor: Ned McWherter; Don Sundquist; Phil Bredesen
- Preceded by: Harlan Mathews
- Succeeded by: Dale Sims

Personal details
- Born: Stephen Douglas Adams; May 27, 1951 (age 75) Cornersville, Tennessee, U.S.
- Party: Democratic
- Spouse: Reta Stockman
- Education: Austin Peay State University

Stephen Douglas Adams (born May 27, 1951) is a former state treasurer of Tennessee, who served in that position for sixteen years, from 1987 to 2003.

== Early life and education ==
Adams was born in Cornersville in Marshall County, Tennessee. He attended Austin Peay State University.

== Career ==
Adams joined the Tennessee Department of Conservation in 1973 and left for the Treasury Department in 1975.

Adams was elected Tennessee State Treasurer by the state's General Assembly in 1987, following the appointment of Harlan Mathews to Governor Ned McWherter's cabinet. He continued to be reelected another eight times. He was President of the National Association of State Treasurers from 1997 to 1998.

Adams resigned from his position as Treasurer on October 24, 2003, to become Chief Administrative Officer of the Tennessee Lottery. He was dismissed in 2006 after allegations of workplace harassment. Adams denied the claims and took legal action against the state lottery to release his employment records.
