= 1990 United States House of Representatives elections in Tennessee =

- November 6, 1990

All 9 Tennessee seats to the United States House of Representatives
	Majority party	Minority party	Third party
Party	Democratic	Republican	Independent
Last election	6	3	0
Seats won	6	3	0
Seat change	Steady	Steady	Steady
Popular vote	369,294	288,633	58,778
Percentage	51.51%	40.26%	8.20%
Swing	▼8.39%	▲2.19%	▲6.18%

Democratic hold
Republican hold
Democratic
40–50%
50–60%
60–70%
70–80%
80–90%
90–100%
Republican
50–60%
60–70%
70–80%
80–90%
90–100%

The 1990 congressional elections in Tennessee was held on November 6, 1990, to determine who will represent the state of Tennessee in the United States House of Representatives.

Following the 1990 elections, no seats changed hands, leaving the Tennessee delegation at a 6-3 Democratic majority.

== Overview ==
United States House of Representatives elections in Tennessee, 1990
Party	Votes	Percentage	Seats	+/–
Democratic	369,294	51.51%	6	—
Republican	288,633	40.26%	3	—
Independents	58,778	8.20%	0	—
Write-ins	167	0.02%	0	—
Totals	716,872	100.00%	9	—

Popular vote
Democratic	51.51%
Republican	40.26%
Other	8.22%

House seats
Democratic	66.67%
Republican	33.33%

== By district ==
District	Incumbent			This race	
District	Representative	Party	First elected	Results	Candidates
Tennessee 1	Jimmy Quillen	Republican	1962	Incumbent re-elected.	▌ ✓ Jimmy Quillen (Republican) 99.9%
Tennessee 2	Jimmy Duncan	Republican	1988	Incumbent re-elected.	▌ ✓ Jimmy Duncan (Republican) 80.6%; ▌Peter Hebert (Independent) 19.4%
Tennessee 3	Marilyn Lloyd	Democratic	1974	Incumbent re-elected.	▌ ✓ Marilyn Lloyd (Democratic) 53.0%; ▌Grady L. Rhoden (Republican) 39.3%; ▌Peter T. Melcher (Independent) 6.0%; ▌George E. Googe (Independent) 1.7%
Tennessee 4	Jim Cooper	Democratic	1982	Incumbent re-elected.	▌ ✓ Jim Cooper (Democratic) 67.4%; ▌Claiborne Sanders (Republican) 29.6%; ▌Gene M. Bullington (Independent) 3.0%
Tennessee 5	Bob Clement	Democratic	1988	Incumbent re-elected.	▌ ✓ Bob Clement (Democratic) 72.4%; ▌Tom Stone (Independent) 17.7%; ▌Al Borgman (Independent) 7.0%; ▌Maurice Kuttab (Independent) 2.9%
Tennessee 6	Bart Gordon	Democratic	1984	Incumbent re-elected.	▌ ✓ Bart Gordon (Democratic) 66.7%; ▌Gregory Cochran (Republican) 29.1%; ▌Ken Brown (Independent) 4.2%
Tennessee 7	Don Sundquist	Republican	1982	Incumbent re-elected.	▌ ✓ Don Sundquist (Republican) 62.0%; ▌Ken Bloodworth (Democratic) 38.0%
Tennessee 8	John S. Tanner	Democratic	1988	Incumbent re-elected.	▌ ✓ John S. Tanner (Democratic); Uncontested
Tennessee 9	Harold Ford Sr.	Democratic	1974	Incumbent re-elected.	▌ ✓ Harold Ford Sr. (Democratic) 58.1%; ▌Aaron C. Davis (Republican) 30.8%; ▌Thomas M. Davidson (Independent) 8.7%; ▌Isaac Richmond (Independent) 2.4%

== See also ==
- 1990 United States Senate election in Tennessee
- 1990 Tennessee gubernatorial election
- 1990 United States elections
