= Byron Looper =

American convicted murderer and political assassin

Byron (Low Tax) Looper
- Mugshot of Looper
- Born: Byron Anthony Looper; September 15, 1964; Cookeville, Tennessee, U.S.
- Died: June 26, 2013 (aged 48); Morgan County Correctional Complex, Wartburg, Tennessee, U.S.
- Other name: Low Tax
- Status: Deceased
- Motive: Rivalry
- Conviction: First degree murder
- Penalty: Life imprisonment

Details
- Killed: 1 (Tommy Burks)

Putnam County Tax Assessor
- In office 1996–1998
- Preceded by: Bill Rippetoe

Personal details
- Party: Republican (from 1992)
- Other political affiliations: Democratic (until 1992)

Byron (Low Tax) Looper (born Byron Anthony Looper; September 15, 1964 – June 26, 2013) was a Democratic turned Republican politician in Tennessee and convicted murderer. To advance his political career, he legally changed his middle name from "Anthony" to "(Low Tax)", including the parentheses. After being convicted for the October 1998 assassination of his election opponent, incumbent Tennessee State Senator Tommy Burks, he was given a life sentence in prison. He died in prison in 2013.

== Early life, education and early career ==
Byron Looper was born in Cookeville, Tennessee. He spent most of his childhood in Georgia, where his father, Aaron Looper, was a school superintendent.

Looper attended the U.S. Military Academy at West Point from 1983 to 1985, but he was given an honorable discharge following what he said was a serious knee injury. After being discharged, he moved to Georgia, where he attended the University of Georgia and worked for the state legislature after graduation.

In 1988, Looper ran for the Georgia House of Representatives as a Democrat, losing to Wyc Orr in the Democratic primary. He enrolled as a graduate student in the Stetson School of Business and Economics at Mercer University in Atlanta. He continued his political involvement as an officer in the Georgia Young Democrats organization and as a campaign worker in Al Gore's 1988 campaign for the Democratic presidential nomination and the 1992 Clinton–Gore presidential campaign.

== Career ==
In 1992, Looper returned to Tennessee and became a Republican. He lost a race for the Tennessee House of Representatives in 1994, when he ran against incumbent legislator Jere Hargrove.

In 1996, he legally changed his middle name from Anthony to "(Low Tax)" and ran successfully for the post of Putnam County tax assessor, defeating a 14-year incumbent named Bill Rippetoe after a campaign in which he did not make any public appearances nor participate in debates, instead relying heavily on negative campaign ads.

As tax assessor, Looper used his office's equipment to send numerous press releases to Tennessee news media, making positive claims about himself and alleging various shortcomings on the part of other local officials. He seldom went to work, and many instances of irregularities in property tax assessments were reported.

In March 1998, following an investigation by the Tennessee Bureau of Investigation, Looper was indicted on 14 counts of official misconduct, theft of services and official oppression for theft, misuse of county property, and misuse of county employees. He claimed the charges were politically motivated due to Democratic control of Putnam County politics and the Tennessee General Assembly. The Cookeville Herald-Citizen newspaper regularly reported the Republican tax assessor's bizarre antics and public verbal assaults of Putnam County elected officials. The Tennessee Republican Party soon claimed no connection with Looper.

The ouster suit led to Looper's removal from office in January 1999.

Looper also faced legal problems from a former girlfriend, who sued him for $1.2 million, saying that she became pregnant and bore a child after he raped her and that he had used his official position to steal her house. Earlier, he had run campaign ads in which he falsely represented the same girlfriend as his wife.

After Looper's removal from office and conviction for murder, prosecutors decided not to pursue the criminal indictments filed in March 1998.

== 1998 political candidacies ==
In the August 1998 primary, Looper sought the Republican nominations for both Tennessee's 6th congressional district and Tennessee's 15th Senate district. He failed to obtain the congressional nomination, finishing third in a field of four candidates, but he was unopposed for the state senate nomination. This set up his campaign against incumbent Democratic State Senator Tommy Burks.

Burks had represented Putnam County in the state legislature for 28 years, including four two-year terms in the Tennessee House of Representatives and five four-year terms in the Tennessee State Senate. A farmer and an old-style moderate Southern Democrat, he was popular in his district. He usually won re-election with ease, and the 1998 campaign was expected to be no different.

== Assassination of Tommy Burks ==
On the morning of October 19, 1998, authorities were called to investigate an apparent murder at the Burks farm. Tommy Burks' body was found with his head resting on the steering wheel of his pickup truck and a single bullet wound above his left eye. Burks had been speaking moments earlier with a farmhand, Wesley Rex, about work that needed to be done on the farm.

Both men had seen a black car drive by the farm on multiple occasions that morning, driven by a man in sunglasses and black gloves. The car had later sped by Rex's truck, allowing Rex to get a view of the driver.

Cumberland County authorities could not initially find anyone with a plausible motive for murdering Burks, but after seeing a picture of Looper on television, Rex told Burks's widow, Charlotte Burks, that Looper was the man he had seen speeding away in the black car on the morning of the murder.

Looper later turned up in Hot Springs, Arkansas, where he met with a friend, United States Marine Corps recruiter Joe Bond. Bond and Looper had been friends as children, and Looper had rekindled the friendship in the summer of 1998, largely on the basis of wanting Bond's expertise in small arms. Bond would eventually become a key witness for the prosecution in Looper's murder trial. Looper had stayed with Bond for a while, talking a great deal about how he had murdered his senate opponent and how he needed, among other things, to change the tires on the car he had used in the murder, as well as hide the car.

Looper was charged with 1st degree murder and arrested on October 23, 1998. He was denied bond.

Looper was arraigned at a hearing that featured Bond as a surprise witness for the state. During the pretrial phase, Looper attempted to have his former friend disgraced, and shuffled through at least six lawyers, one of whom filed a sealed court document explaining why, for ethical reasons, he could no longer be Looper's attorney.

== Campaign after the murder ==
Tennessee state law required that the name of a candidate who died before the election be removed from the ballot, and it did not allow the candidate's party to replace a deceased candidate who died within 30 days of the election. Accordingly, after Burks's death, Looper became the only candidate listed on the official ballot for Burks's senate seat.

Several people tried to have Looper's name stricken from the ballot, claiming that Looper's arrest constituted moral turpitude. The state Republican Party distanced itself from Looper. To prevent Looper from winning the state senate seat on a technicality, her husband's supporters put forward Burks's widow Charlotte as a write-in candidate. Although Charlotte did not actively campaign, dozens of volunteers supported her, including some Republicans. On election day, Charlotte Burks, as a write-in candidate, won the seat with 30,252 votes (95.18%) against Looper's 1,531 votes (4.82%). One of her first initiatives as state senator was to introduce legislation to ensure that the name of any candidate who dies within 40 days of an election could remain on the ballot, thus preventing the situation that occurred after her husband's death. Charlotte Burks won re-election in 2002, 2006, and 2010. She retired after the 2014 election.

== Murder conviction and sentence ==
Looper's jury trial for murder finally occurred in 2000 after several delays because he repeatedly changed attorneys, most of whom filed a variety of motions requesting a different judge, as well as change of venue. Ultimately, Looper's trial was not moved; jurors were brought in from Sullivan County to reduce the chance that they had been influenced by pretrial publicity. By the time of the trial, a work crew had found the weapon apparently used in the murder, near the junction of Tennessee State Route 111 and I-40.

Wes Rex and Joe Bond were both prominent witnesses for the prosecution, as were two political consultants, who reported having been contacted at various times by Looper, who had told both men that he wanted to run a political race, and felt the surest way to win would be to murder his opponent. Tennessee Bureau of Investigation expert Sandy Evans testified that the tire tracks at the scene came from Looper's Audi. The prosecuting attorney, Tony Craighead, told the jury that Looper had intended to "win this election with a Smith & Wesson." For his defense, Looper tried to rely on testimony from his mother and her neighbors, who said he was visiting his mother's home in Flowery Branch, Georgia, on the morning that Burks died, but witnesses he produced to support his alibi were excluded from testifying because they had not been identified to the court before the trial, as required by Tennessee law. Despite forensic and eyewitness evidence presented at trial, Looper's mother maintained her son's innocence to his death, and beyond.

In August 2000, Looper was convicted of first-degree murder and sentenced to life in prison without chance of parole. The victim's family had requested that prosecutors not seek the death penalty. Following his conviction and sentencing, he was transferred to Brushy Mountain State Penitentiary in Petros, Tennessee. When the Brushy Mountain Penitentiary closed in 2009, Looper was moved to the Morgan County Correctional Complex.

In late 2001, Looper sued a TV station and individual station personnel for depicting him unfavorably in a broadcast interview. Meanwhile, Looper was also the subject of "Eliminating the Competition", episode 163 of the TV series American Justice.

He also filed a lawsuit against Tennessee Department of Correction personnel and the contractor that provided medical services in Tennessee prisons, charging that the conditions of his confinement were unconstitutional and that he was not receiving adequate medical care. In that suit, he asked for $47 million in damages. He also filed several unsuccessful motions to overturn his conviction.

== Death ==
Looper was found dead in his prison cell on June 26, 2013. A prison incident report shows that he assaulted a pregnant counselor less than two hours before his body was found; Looper had to be restrained during that incident. An autopsy revealed that he had a heart condition caused by a combination of high blood pressure and hardening arteries; he also had a toxic level of antidepressants in his system.

== "Low Tax" name imitators ==
Other political candidates and public personalities have emulated Looper's adopted name or have independently adopted similar names. Among these were Something Awful founder Richard "Lowtax" Kyanka, who adopted his nickname as a humorous reference to Byron Looper, for whom Kyanka nearly worked as an intern in the summer of 1997. In 1998, a candidate with the name Craig 'Tax Freeze' Freis ran for the California Board of Equalization. He finished in fourth place (out of six candidates running) in the Democratic primary for the office.

In Los Angeles County, a candidate named John "Lower Taxes" Loew ran in every election for county assessor from 2000 through 2018. He explained that he changed his name to send a message about his political positions. In 2000, Loew received less than 1% of the vote in the special election to fill a vacancy in the office. In 2002 and 2006, Loew lost the elections to incumbent Rick Auerbach by margins of 70%–11% and 77%–23% respectively. Loew ran again in 2010, where he finished in third place with 10.6% of the vote. In 2014, he finished in fourth place with 9.47% of the vote. In 2018 Loew again ran with the name "Lower Taxes" on the ballot and ended up in second place with 23.58%, forcing incumbent Jeffrey Prang into a runoff. Loew lost the runoff to Prang by a margin of a little over 20%.

== Electoral history ==
1998 Tennessee Senate 15th district election
Party	Candidate	Votes	%
Democratic	Charlotte Burks (write-in)	30,252	95.18%
Republican	Byron Looper	1,531	4.82%

1996 Putnam County Assessor of Property election
Party	Candidate	Votes	%
Republican	Byron Looper	6,401	54.41%
Democratic	Bill Rippetoe	5,363	45.59%
