= Dwight Henry =

Dwight Henry may refer to:

- Dwight Henry (politician) (born 1953), American politician in Tennessee
- Dwight Henry (actor) (born 1962), American actor, baker, and businessman
