= A. Keith Bissell =

American politician

Member of the Tennessee House of Representatives from the 33rd district
- In office 1971–1978

Member of the Tennessee Public Service Commission
- In office 1978 – May 10, 1996

Personal details
- Born: December 3, 1941 (age 84)
- Party: Democratic

A. Keith Bissell (born December 3, 1941) is a Tennessee politician who served in the Tennessee House of Representatives and was the last chairman of the Tennessee Public Service Commission.

== Early life and education ==
Keith Bissell was born December 3, 1941, to Alvin K. Bissell and Helen Tilley Bissell. He grew up in Oak Ridge, Tennessee, the newly established Manhattan Project community to which his family moved in 1943 and where his father was mayor for many years. He graduated from Oak Ridge High School in 1959 and attended the University of Tennessee, where he received a bachelor's degree in business administration and later a law degree.

== Tennessee House of Representatives ==
A Democrat, Keith Bissell won election to the Tennessee House of Representatives in 1970 as a resident of Oak Ridge, representing the 33rd District in the 87th General Assembly (1971–1972). He was re-elected to three two-year terms in 1972, 1974, and 1976, and continued his House services in the 88th through 90th General Assemblies.

== Tennessee Public Service Commission ==
Keith Bissell was first elected to statewide office as a member of the Tennessee Public Service Commission (PSC) in 1978, representing East Tennessee. He won re-election in 1984 and 1990 and served on the PSC for over 17 years, until resigning May 10, 1996, shortly before the PSC's abolition at the end of June 1996. During most of his PSC tenure, he was chairman of the three-member commission.

== Congressional campaign ==
After incumbent Marilyn Lloyd announced that she would not seek re-election in 1988, Bissell campaigned to become that year's Democratic nominee for the U.S. House of Representatives in Tennessee's 3rd congressional district, but he ended his campaign after Lloyd changed her mind and decided to run again.
