= Oak Ridge High School (Tennessee) =

High school in Oak Ridge, Tennessee

Coordinates: 36.0165°N 84.261°W

Location
- 1450 Oak Ridge Turnpike; Oak Ridge, Tennessee 37830; United States

Information
- Type: Public secondary
- Established: 1943
- Principal: Nick Corrigan
- Grades: 9–12
- Enrollment: 1,635 (2024–2025)
- Colors: Cardinal, white and gray
- Mascot: Wildcats
- Newspaper: The Oak Leaf
- Yearbook: The Oak Log
- Website: www.highschool.ortn.edu

Oak Ridge High School is the public high school for Oak Ridge, Tennessee, enrolling grades 9 through 12. It was established in 1943 to educate the children of Manhattan Project workers.

== History ==
=== Founding and first location ===
Oak Ridge High School was established in 1943 by the U.S. Army to educate children of the workers building and operating Manhattan Project facilities in Oak Ridge. The original school building was in eastern Oak Ridge on the hill above the community's first commercial center at Jackson Square. The school's football venue, Jack Armstrong Stadium and Blankenship Field, is adjacent to the original site of the school.

The schools' mascot and colors were selected in 1943 by Ben Martin, who was athletic director (1943–1971) and coached football (1943–1947), basketball (1943–1959), and track (1944–1965). As a graduate and former athlete at the University of Kentucky, Martin adopted Kentucky's "Wildcats" as the ORHS mascot. He chose cardinal red and gray as the school colors to emulate the successful sports programs at Dobyns-Bennett High School in Kingsport, Tennessee.

=== New campus ===
The high school moved to its current central location in Oak Ridge in 1951 after a new state-of-the-art campus was built under the auspices of the U.S. Atomic Energy Commission, which then operated Oak Ridge and its public schools. The new school, which had a capacity of about 1500 students and cost $2,980,000 to build, consisted of four buildings (designated "A", "B," "C", and "D") in two groups, connected by an enclosed glass corridor. The auditorium had a seating capacity of 1400 and was intended to serve the community as well as the school. The school attracted national media attention for its innovative features. A Nashville newspaper dubbed the new buildings “Classes in Glass” because of the unusually large amount of glass used in their design. Two circular buildings, designated "E" and "F", were added in 1963. With the move to the new campus, the school's street address was 127 Providence Road for many years until the school's reconstruction in 2005 moved the administrative offices to the Oak Ridge Turnpike side of the school. The school's street address is now 1450 Oak Ridge Turnpike.

=== Racial integration ===
In its early years, Oak Ridge High School was racially segregated like other schools in the region. On September 6, 1955, it became the first high school in the southern United States to integrate after the U.S. Supreme Court's 1954 Brown v. Board of Education decision. On that date, 85 African American students attended the first day of school. The integration of Oak Ridge High School was the result of a January 1955 directive by the Atomic Energy Commission. Oak Ridge's advisory town council had passed a resolution in December 1953 calling for school integration, leading to an unsuccessful attempt to recall council chairman Waldo Cohn, and during the summer of 1955 some citizens had urged a school boycott to protest integration, but the actual integration of the high school (which was photographed by Life magazine) was uneventful.

In the first year of integration, two African American students became members of the ORHS basketball team, but because segregation was still in force at all other Tennessee high schools, they were not permitted to participate in away games and the coach had to get permission from the opposing teams before they could participate in home games.

=== Grade level reorganization ===
Until 1995, the high school enrolled grades 10 to 12. Grade 9 was added in 1995 when Oak Ridge Schools reorganized grade levels.

=== School reconstruction ===
Oak Ridge High School underwent extensive reconstruction, starting in 2005 and completed in 2008, to update its facilities, incorporate significant energy-conserving features, and construct newer, better equipped learning areas. The total cost of the school renovation was $61 million.

Designed by DLR Group, the renovated Oak Ridge High School was featured in the December 2008 issue of School Planning & Design. It received several awards, including a Citation Award from the American Association of School Administrators, recognition as a Green Project of Distinction Winner in the 2008 Green Education Design Showcase, and a 2009 Learning by Design Citation of Excellence from the American School Board Journal. The Tennessee School Boards Association selected ORHS as the School of the Year for Excellence in Architectural Design; ORHS earned second place in the Renovation Division.

=== Oak Leaf controversy ===
Oak Ridge High School gained notoriety in November 2005 when principal Becky Ervin, then in her first year at the school, censored the student newspaper, the Oak Leaf. The November issue originally contained an article with information on birth control and another with photographs of students' tattoos. Though the paper had already been printed, Principal Ervin attempted to confiscate all 1800 copies. The newspaper's staff, with the help of the Student Press Law Center, brought the controversy national attention. On April 10, 2006, the incident led to Oak Ridge High School receiving a Jefferson Muzzle Award, issued annually by the Thomas Jefferson Center for the Protection of Free Expression to focus attention on free speech and First Amendment violations in the United States. Also in April 2006, Ervin was released from her position as principal and notified that her contract would not be continued for the following school year. Administrators gave no reason for their decision not to renew Ervin's contract. She was temporarily replaced by vice-principal Chuck Carringer, who was appointed to the position on a permanent basis early in 2007.

== Notable honors ==
The Oak Ridge Wildcats football team were national champions for 1958, when they averaged 43.8 points per game and allowed their opponents an average of 2.6 points. In the school's history, the team has won eight state championships.

The Oak Ridge High School cross country teams have won a total of 14 state championships: 8 for boys and 6 for girls. In 2007 the boys' team won the first-ever Nike Team Nationals Southeast Regional and placed 18th at the national meet.

Newsweek ranked Oak Ridge High School 456th on its 2006 list of the United States' 1200 best public high schools.

In 2005, Oak Ridge sent a group of three seniors to the national finals of the Siemens Competition, where they finished fourth for their work in Natural language processing. During the first week of December 2006, three seniors from ORHS presented their research on alternate fuel sources and won first place nationally. Scott Molony, Scott Horton, and Steven Arcangeli split a college scholarship worth $100,000.

In April 2006, another senior tied for first place in the Young Epidemiology Scholars Competition sponsored by the College Board and another senior received a smaller scholarship in the same competition. Oak Ridge is also nationally known for its consistent performance in Science Olympiad. Until recently, ORHS regularly sent a team to the nationals. Students from Oak Ridge also traditionally perform well on the American Math Competition exams.

In 2007 longtime ORHS math teacher Benita Albert was named to the USA Today All-USA Teaching Team, along with 19 other outstanding teachers from around the United States. Earlier that year student Scott Molony was named as one of 20 USA Today student All-Stars.

The Oak Ridge High School orchestra was founded by Edgar Meyer Sr. in 1970 and was directed by him until 1988. His son, Edgar Meyer, was an ORHS student and is now an internationally renowned bassist and composer who has won four Grammy's. Beginning in 1988, the orchestra was led by Jenifer Van Tol for more than 25 years. Van Tol was succeeded by Doug Phillips in 2014.

The Oak Ridge High School Band (or Wildband), currently directed by Michael Spirko, formerly directed by Thomas Wade (retired 2012), Chuck Yost, Jeff Kile and Dale Pendley, consists of two bands: symphonic and concert.

In 2009, ROAR teacher Beth Estep won the Titans Teacher of the Year Award for her outstanding performance and care for her students graduation.

In 2011, Seniors Cassee Cain and Ziyuan Liu won the Siemens Competition for their work using an Xbox Kinect to analyze the walking patterns of people with prosthetics.

In March 2012, The Oak Ridge Wildbots FIRST Robotics Competition Team in their rookie year won the Rookie All-Star award at the Smoky Mountain Regional Competition at the Knoxville Convention Center. They would go on to compete at the FIRST Championship in St. Louis from April 25–29, ultimately placing 68th out of 100 in the Curie division. In March 2013, The Secret City Wildbots FIRST Robotics Competition team in their second year won the Smokey Mountain Regional in Knoxville, TN, along with the Hardin Valley Academy RoHAWKtics and Halls High School Red Nation, and proceeded to the FIRST Championship in St. Louis.

== Principals ==
Oak Ridge High School principals through the school's history have been:

- Charles Oliver, 1943–1945
- E.C. Cunningham, 1946–1947
- Donald Roe, 1948–1953
- Tom Dunigan, 1954–1971
- Jim Schott, 1972–1973
- Don Bordinger, 1974–1982
- William E. Hodgers, 1983–1994
- James F. Duncan, 1995–1999
- Kenneth E. Green, 2000–2005
- Becky W. Ervin, 2005–2006
- Chuck Carringer, 2006–2009
- Jody Goins, 2009–2013
- David Bryant, 2013–2015
- Martin McDonald, 2015–2020
- Garfield Adams, 2020–2021
- Drayton Hawkins, 2022–2025
- Nick Corrigan, 2025–

== Notable alumni ==
- Bill Appleton, software developer and entrepreneur
- Jennifer Azzi, WNBA player and Olympic gold medalist, head coach for University of San Francisco Dons 2010 to 2016; member of Women's Basketball Hall of Fame
- General B.B. Bell, commanding general of U.S. Army in Europe, commander of U.S. Armed Forces in South Korea
- A. Keith Bissell, member of Tennessee House of Representatives and chairman of Tennessee Public Service Commission
- Jane Blankenship, spectroscopist
- Mike Caldwell, former NFL player and coach
- Dean Dillon, songwriter in Country Music Hall of Fame.
- Raynella Dossett Leath, convicted murderer
- Charlie Ergen, co-founder and CEO of EchoStar Communications Corporation
- Nikki Caldwell Fargas, president of the WNBA's Las Vegas Aces, formerly women's basketball head coach for LSU and UCLA
- Stan Fritts, former NFL player
- Mindy Gehrs, All-American swimmer
- Tee Higgins, wide receiver for the Cincinnati Bengals
- Otis Howard, former NBA player
- John Kelly, endurance athlete
- Gene Kimmelman, consumer advocate and attorney
- Kai-Fu Lee, Google executive
- Doug Martin, head football coach at New Mexico State University, previously Kent State
- Jason McAddley, National Football League player
- Matt McMahon, basketball head coach, LSU, formerly at Murray State
- Randy McNally, Tennessee state senator, Speaker of the State Senate and Lieutenant Governor since 2017
- Edgar Meyer, Grammy Award-winning bassist
- Sarah Monette, fantasy author
- Bruce Ohr, U.S. Department of Justice official
- Ellen Reid, composer, received Pulitzer Prize in music in 2019
- Bobby Richards, NFL player (Philadelphia Eagles 1962 to 1965, Atlanta Falcons 1966–67)
- Mitch Rouse, actor, screenwriter, and director in TV and film
- Cameron Sexton, Tennessee state representative; Speaker of the State House since 2019
- Scott Stallings, professional golfer on the PGA Tour
- Bob Winkel, former NFL player
