= Jane Blankenship =

American chemist

- Born: Lamar, Texas, U.S.
- Education: University of Tennessee, Knoxville; Stanford University
- Spouse: Carl H. Gibson
- Scientific career
- Fields: Spectroscopy
- Workplaces: Oak Ridge National Laboratory, Lockheed Aircraft
- Thesis: Rotational Analysis of the 0-0 Band of the B2 Σ _{U} -> X2 Σ g Transition of N+ 2 from Shock Tube Spectra. (1962)

Jane Blankenship is an American chemist. She won high science honors while at Oak Ridge High School before graduating in June 1958 from the University of Tennessee, Knoxville with a B.S. in chemistry. She worked summers at Oak Ridge National Laboratory, where her father Dr. Forest F. Blankenship was a physical chemist, and then married Carl H. Gibson, a chemical engineer, and became employed as a spectroscopist for Lockheed Aircraft in Palo Alto, California.

== National attention ==
In 1961, a news story was written regarding “sex desegregation” in the sciences and a photograph of her was utilized to illustrate the critical significance of inspiring women to pursue careers in science.

As of 2008 Professor David Kaiser of the Massachusetts Institute of Technology began offering a graduate level course titled “Cold War Science” that discussed the role women featured during the Cold War and included Jane Blankenship Gibson as an example.

== Thesis ==
- Rotational Analysis of the 0-0 Band of the B2 Σ _{U} -> X2 Σ g Transition of N+ 2 from Shock Tube Spectra.

== Selected publications ==
- Gibson, J. B., Goland, A. N., Milgram, M., & Vineyard, G. (1960). Dynamics of radiation damage. Physical Review, 120(4), 1229.
- Gibson, J. B., Goland, A. N., & Milgram, M. (1960). The Nature of Radiation Damage in FCC Metals 265 GH Vineyard. Phys. Rev. O, 12, 1229.
- Gibson, J. A. B. (1961). Liquid Scintillation Counting of Tritium in Urine. Physics in medicine and biology, 6(1), 55.
- Gibson, J. A. B. (1961). Detection of Tritium with a Film Dosemeter. Physics in Medicine and Biology, 6(2), 283.
- Gibson, Jane Blankenship. (1962). Rotational Analysis of the 0-0 Band of the B2 [sigma Subscript U]-> X2 [sigma] g Transition of N+ 2 from Shock Tube Spectra. Physical Sciences Program, Stanford University.
- Gibson, J. A. B. (1962). Measurement of the Gamma Radiation Background (No. AERE-R-4137). United Kingdom Atomic Energy Authority. Research Group. Atomic Energy Research Establishment, Harwell, Berks, England.
- Gibson, J. A. B. (1962). Gamma radiation background measurements - instrument selection. 1962.
