= Ned McWherter =

American politician (1930–2011)

Ned Ray McWherter
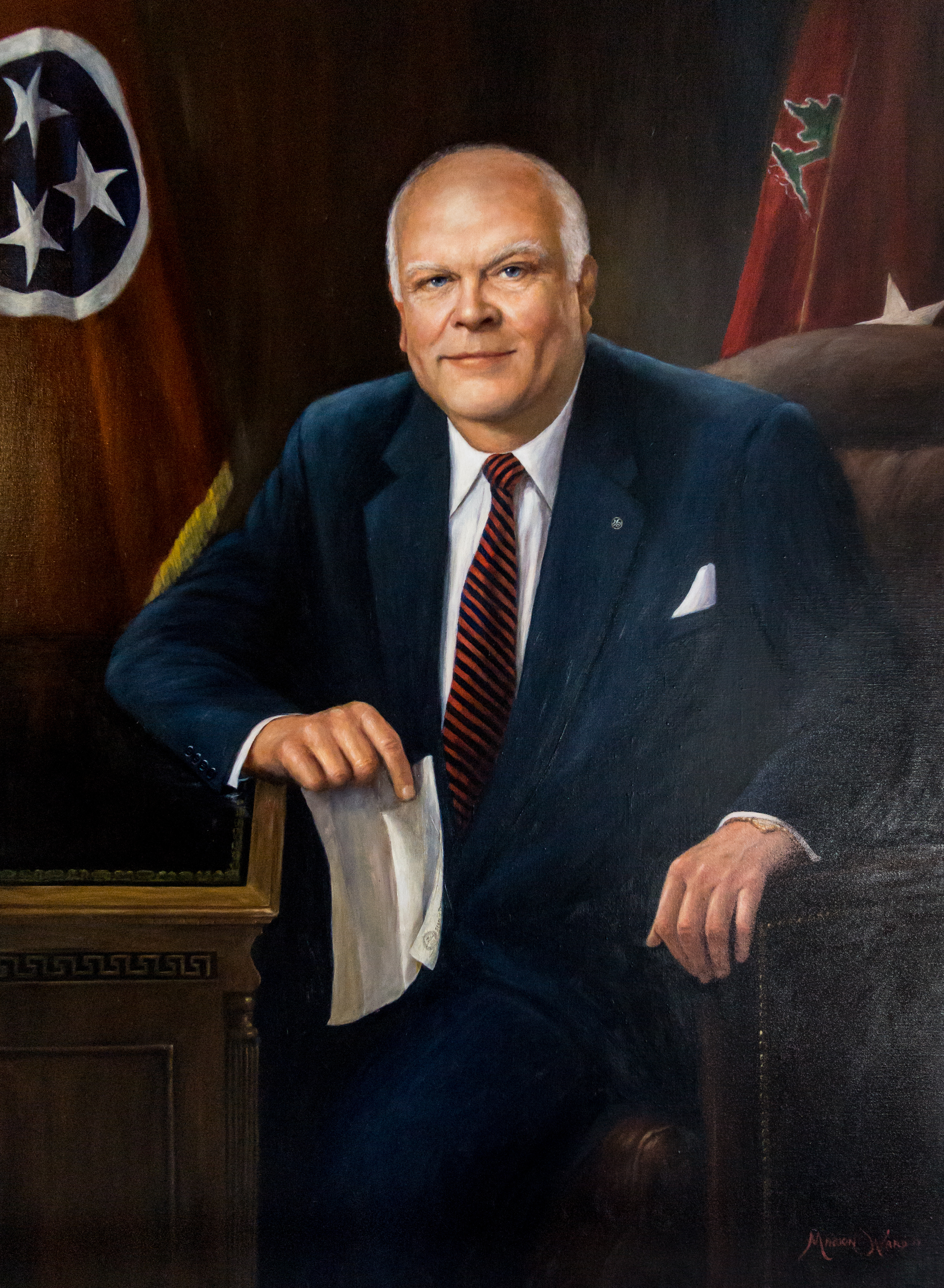

46th Governor of Tennessee
- In office January 17, 1987 – January 21, 1995
- Lieutenant: John S. Wilder
- Preceded by: Lamar Alexander
- Succeeded by: Don Sundquist

77th Speaker of the Tennessee House of Representatives
- In office January 20, 1973 – January 13, 1987
- Preceded by: James McKinney
- Succeeded by: Ed Murray

Member of the Tennessee House of Representatives
- In office January 7, 1969 – January 13, 1987
- Preceded by: Milton H. Hamilton Jr.
- Succeeded by: Roy Herron

Personal details
- Born: October 15, 1930 Palmersville, Tennessee, U.S.
- Died: April 4, 2011 (aged 80) Nashville, Tennessee, U.S.
- Resting place: Sunset Cemetery, Dresden, Tennessee, U.S.
- Party: Democratic
- Spouse: Bette Jean Beck (m. 1953; died 1973)
- Children: Mike McWherter & Linda Ramsey
- Occupation: Businessman, Farmer

Military service
- Allegiance: United States; Tennessee
- Branch/service: Tennessee National Guard
- Years of service: 1947–1968
- Rank: Captain

Ned Ray McWherter (October 15, 1930 – April 4, 2011) was an American businessman and politician who served as the 46th governor of Tennessee, from 1987 to 1995. Prior to that, he served as the speaker of the Tennessee House of Representatives from 1973 to 1987, the longest tenure as Speaker up to that time. He was a member of the Democratic Party.

== Early life ==
McWherter was born in Palmersville, Weakley County, Tennessee, the son of Harmon Ray McWherter, a sharecropper, and Lucille (Smith) McWherter. He grew up in the Little Zion community near Palmersville, where he attended a one-room schoolhouse. In the early 1940s, his family moved to Ypsilanti, Michigan, where his father worked in wartime factories. In May 1945, the family moved to Dresden, Tennessee, where McWherter's parents purchased the City Cafe, which they would operate for several years.

McWherter attended Dresden High School, where he was co-captain of the football team and president of the school's Future Farmers of America chapter. After graduating, he attempted to play college football, first at the University of Tennessee at Martin, and then at the University of Memphis, and finally at Murray State, but he suffered a knee injury prior to each season at all three schools.

His college athletic career cut short, McWherter joined the Martin Shoe Company as a salesman. When the company's line of sandals struggled against competition from cheaper Japanese imports, McWherter travelled throughout the Caribbean and Central America in an attempt to find retailers, eventually finding a market for the sandals in Puerto Rico. In 1964, McWherter founded Volunteer Distributing to distribute Anheuser-Busch beer in the Weakley area. Two years later, he opened Dresden's first nursing home.

McWherter served for 21 years (1947–1968) in the Tennessee National Guard before retiring with the rank of captain. He was a member of the United Methodist Church.

== Tennessee House of Representatives ==
McWherter became actively involved in politics in the late 1950s, when he worked for the successful campaign of 8th district congressional candidate, Robert "Fats" Everett. In 1968, Doug Murphy, the Mayor of Martin, convinced him to run for Weakley County's seat in the Tennessee House of Representatives. McWherter won the seat without opposition. He was reelected to the seat eight times, usually running unopposed.

McWherter entered the House of Representatives at a turbulent time in state politics. During his first term, Republicans controlled the House for the first time in several decades. During his second (1971–1973), Democrats regained control of the House, but a Republican governor, Winfield Dunn, had been elected. To counter Dunn, Democrats chose fiery Nashville attorney James McKinney as Speaker of the House. McKinney vehemently opposed Dunn's initiatives and refused to consider most of his legislation.

At the beginning of McWherter's third term (1973–1975), Democratic legislators, who controlled the House by a slim 50–49 margin, were concerned that McKinney's stubbornness was preventing the state from conducting its affairs, and several suggested replacing McKinney with McWherter. In the House Democratic Caucus, McWherter was chosen over McKinney as the party's choice for Speaker by a single vote. Sensing disunity among Democrats, Governor Dunn tried to convince disgruntled McKinney supporters to vote for a Republican in the full House vote, but was unsuccessful, and McWherter was elected Speaker by a 50–49 margin.

One of McWherter's first major issues as Speaker was a 1974 bill that sought to establish a medical school at East Tennessee State University in Johnson City. The bill was popular in East Tennessee, parts of which were struggling with a low doctors-per-capita ratio. Governor Dunn, however, vetoed the bill, arguing the medical school in Memphis was adequate for the state's needs. This sparked cries of favoritism from East Tennesseans (Dunn was from Memphis). After the state senate voted to override the veto, McWherter, brushing off a threat from former Memphis mayor Henry Loeb, led the House in overriding the veto, allowing the bill to become law. When Dunn ran for another term as governor in 1986, his lack of support for the medical school in Johnson City came back to haunt him. Despite an overwhelming Republican base in the eastern part of the state, McWherter was able to gain the support of Republican Congressman James H. Quillen to pick up a majority of votes in the state's First Congressional District.

In 1976, McWherter supported Democratic presidential candidate Jimmy Carter. At a Carter campaign event in Memphis, McWherter expressed irritation with an ABC cameraman, prompting reporter Sam Donaldson to tell the cameraman, "don't mind him, he's a nobody." Years later, when President Ronald Reagan was scheduled to appear before the Tennessee General Assembly, McWherter removed Donaldson's name from the media credentials list. When Donaldson showed up at the state capitol, he was denied admission by the House sergeant-at-arms. After issuing a string of profanities, Donaldson stormed out of the building and returned to Washington.

In January 1979, outgoing Governor Ray Blanton issued pardons to over 50 state inmates, including several convicted murderers. His administration had been under investigation for selling pardons, and the FBI and state lawmakers feared more illicit pardons would be issued in his final days in office. To prevent this, McWherter and Lieutenant Governor John S. Wilder engineered a constitutional maneuver that allowed the governor-elect, Lamar Alexander, to be sworn in three days early.

During the 1980s, McWherter worked with the Alexander administration on a number of issues, including foreign investment and education. McWherter's support was critical in helping Alexander obtain passage of the "Career Ladder" bill, which provided income supplements to the state's top teachers.

== Gubernatorial tenure ==
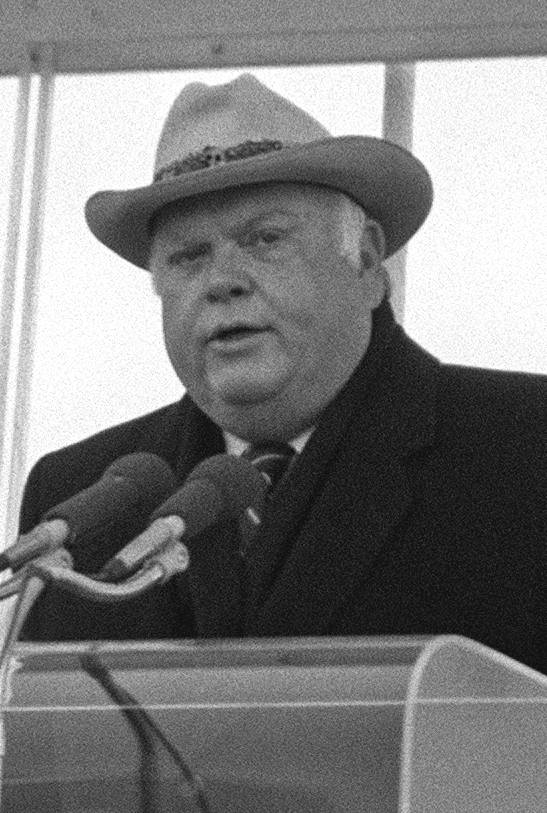
Governor McWherter speaking at a ceremony, December 1988

=== 1986 election ===
As the 1986 governor's race approached, Democrats struggled to find a candidate. Neither Bob Clement nor Anna Belle Clement O'Brien was interested in running, and the 1978 nominee, Jake Butcher, was facing bank fraud charges.

Sensing an opportunity, McWherter entered the race, and defeated Public Service Commissioner Jane Eskind and Nashville mayor Richard Fulton for the nomination, winning 42% of the vote to 29% for Eskind, and 26% for Fulton. With Alexander term-limited, Republicans nominated former Governor Winfield Dunn.

Dunn's campaign tried to portray McWherter as a West Tennessee beer salesman, though McWherter pointed out that Dunn was a co-owner of a hotel in Nashville that sold liquor, and noted that Pilot, a convenience store chain owned by Dunn's campaign treasurer, Jim Haslam, was one of the state's largest beer retailers. Dunn also failed to pick up a critical endorsement from East Tennessee congressman Jimmy Quillen, who was still bitter over Dunn's veto of the ETSU medical school bill. McWherter ran a strong statewide campaign, visiting and organizing in all 95 counties. On election day, he defeated Dunn, 656,602 votes to 553,449.

=== Tenure ===
During his first term, McWherter insisted that all formal governmental proceedings be open to the public and press, thus implementing the spirit, as well as the letter, of the "sunshine law" he had helped to author and sponsor while a member of the House. His "21st century Schools" education reform program launched similar programs in other states and his replacement of the Medicaid program with the TennCare system gained national attention. As governor, he also served nationally and locally on various councils and committees, including the board of governors, Council of State Governments, the Executive Committees of the Southern Conference, the Weakley County Head Start Program, and the Executive Committee of the Northwest Tennessee Economic Development District.

In the late 1980s, a showdown erupted between Tennessee and North Carolina over the pollution of the Pigeon River, which rises in North Carolina and traverses a mountainous area before emptying into the French Broad River in East Tennessee. East Tennessee residents and environmentalists charged that toxins dumped into the river by the Champion Paper Mill in Canton, North Carolina, damaged the river's economic potential and had led to an unusually high rate of cancer in lower Pigeon Valley communities. Canton residents argued that the town was economically dependent on the mill, which employed 2,000 workers.

When the Environmental Protection Agency ordered Champion to upgrade the plant to meet Tennessee's water quality standards, the company threatened to close the plant and lay off all 2,000 workers. East Tennessee residents held demonstrations, and asked that Governor McWherter not renew the plant's water quality variance. Legislators from both states traded barbs, cars with Tennessee license plates were vandalized in North Carolina, and McWherter's office was flooded with calls from angry North Carolina residents. Following an unscheduled trip to Canton, where he was confronted by a sheriff who told him he was "trespassing on Champion's River," McWherter announced on Christmas Day, 1988, that he would not renew the plant's water quality variance.

==== 1990 reelection and later tenure ====
McWherter was overwhelmingly re-elected to a second term in 1990, defeating the Republican nominee, first-term state representative Dwight Henry, 479,990 votes to 288,904. A tax study commission appointed during his first term reported at the beginning of his second, recommending a state income tax be implemented. An income tax has long been considered the third rail of Tennessee politics. McWherter gave the idea lukewarm support at first, but the idea was eventually dropped entirely, not to resurface again during his time as governor.

In 1990, McWherter was invited to speak at a chapel service at Freed-Hardeman University in Henderson, Tennessee at the request of his lifelong friend, E. Claude Gardner, then president of the university. In 1992, Senator Al Gore was elected vice president, thus creating a vacancy in the Senate. McWherter appointed his deputy governor, Harlan Matthews, to serve as U.S. Senator until the 1994 election. In 1994, McWherter was named the nation's most outstanding governor by Governing magazine.

== Post-Governorship ==
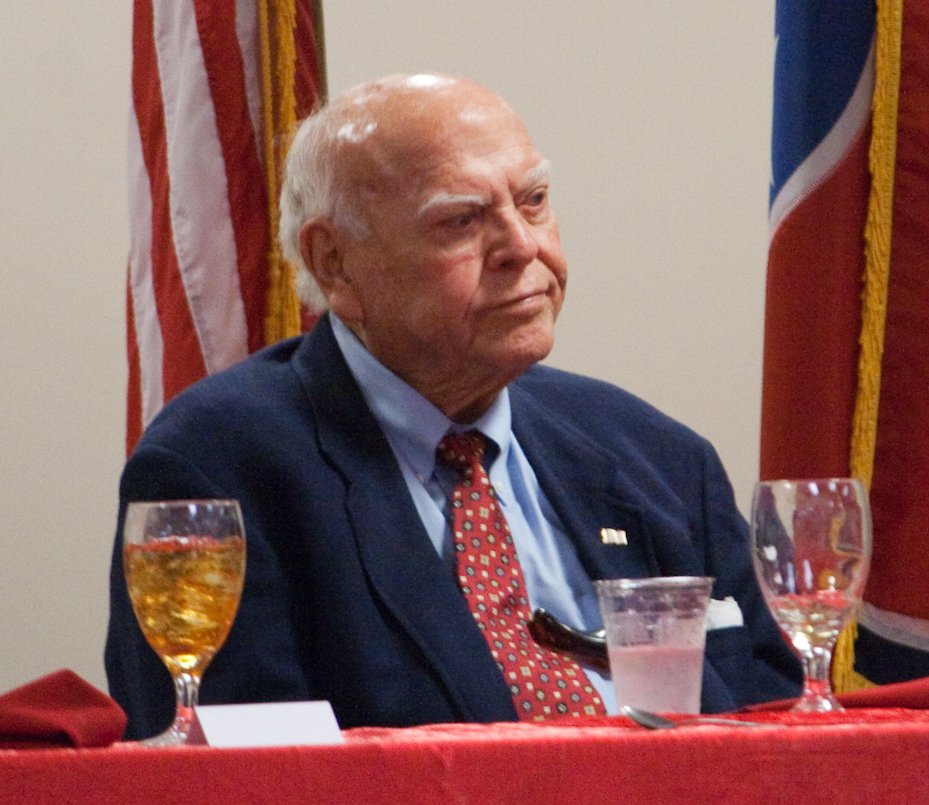
McWherter in 2010

McWherter would have been an overwhelming favorite for a third term if he had been permitted to run for one by the state constitution; when asked about this, he stated that he would not have run for another term even if it had been permissible. Following the end of his second term as governor in 1995, McWherter was appointed to the Board of Governors of the United States Postal Service by President Bill Clinton. McWherter lived the remainder of his life in Tennessee, where he was very active in the Tennessee Democratic Party.

In the 2010 gubernatorial race, McWherter's son, Mike, ran against Knoxville mayor Bill Haslam. The 79-year-old McWherter helped his son campaign, and bought a red sports car to ride in campaign parades. Haslam won the election by a landslide.

McWherter died on April 4, 2011, at Centennial Medical Center in Nashville, where he was being treated for cancer. Former President Clinton delivered remarks at McWherter's memorial service, and numerous other public figures issued statements of condolence. McWherter is buried in Sunset Cemetery in Dresden.

== Family and legacy ==
McWherter married Bette Jean (Beck) McWherter in 1953. She died of cancer in 1973. His son Michael Ray McWherter is a businessman and former candidate for governor, and his daughter Linda Ramsey is a doctor of physical education at the University of Tennessee at Martin. McWherter funded the construction of the library at the University of Memphis and the Learning Resources Center at Middle Tennessee State University, and both buildings have been named in his honor. The Weakley County Library in Dresden has also been named for McWherter. A bronze statue of McWherter stands on the Weakley County Courthouse lawn. A building at the Quillen College of Medicine at East Tennessee State University is also named in McWherter's honor.

Political offices
Preceded by James McKinney	Speaker of the Tennessee House of Representatives; January 20, 1973–January 17, 1987	Succeeded by Ed Murray
Preceded by Lamar Alexander	Governor of Tennessee; January 17, 1987–January 21, 1995	Succeeded by Don Sundquist
Party political offices
Preceded by Randy Tyree	Democratic nominee for Governor of Tennessee; 1986, 1990	Succeeded by Phil Bredesen
