= Joel Allen Battle =

American politician and soldier

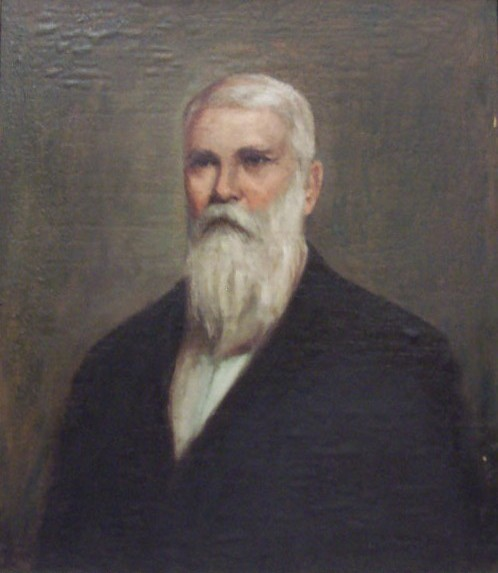

Superintendent of the Tennessee State Prison
- In office 1872–1872
- Governor: John C. Brown

7th Treasurer of Tennessee
- In office February 1863 – 1865
- Appointed by: Isham G. Harris
- Preceded by: William F. McGregor
- Succeeded by: Robert L. Stanford

Member of the Tennessee House of Representatives from Davidson County
- In office 1851–1853
- Preceded by: C. W. Nance; George Earl Maney
- Succeeded by: W. H. Clements; John Hugh Smith

Personal details
- Born: September 19, 1811 Davidson County, Tennessee, U.S.
- Died: August 23, 1872 (aged 60) Tennessee, U.S.
- Resting place: Davidson County, Tennessee, U.S.
- Spouse(s): Sarah Searcy; Adeline Sanders Mosley
- Nickname(s): Grandpa, Grand Old Man

Military service
- Allegiance: United States of America: Tennessee; Confederate States of America
- Branch/service: Tennessee Militia; Confederate States Army
- Years of service: 1835 (USA); 1861-1863 (CSA)
- Rank: Brigadier General (USA) 1835; Colonel (CSA)
- Commands: 20th Tennessee Infantry Regiment
- Battles/wars: Second Seminole War; American Civil War: Battle of Mill Springs; Battle of Shiloh

Joel Allen Battle (September 19, 1811 – August 23, 1872) was an American politician and soldier. He was appointed a Tennessee militia general in 1835 during the Second Seminole War. He was a colonel in the Confederate States Army during the American Civil War.

== Early life ==
Joel Battle was born in Davidson County, Tennessee, on September 19, 1811. He became an orphan at an early age, but despite this became a very rich man under the slavery system economics of Tennessee. By 19 years old, he married Sarah Searcy who gave birth to his first son William. Sarah died two years after giving birth. Battle, now a widower, raised a company for the Second Seminole War in Cane Ridge. By 1835, Battle was promoted to brigadier general of the Tennessee Militia. He eventually remarried to Adeline Sanders Mosley, and had 6 more children. He was also elected to the Tennessee General Assembly becoming a popular Whig.

== Civil war ==
In April 1861, when the American Civil War began, Battle raised an infantry company in Nolensville, Tennessee, which he named the Zollicoffer Guards, paying respect to Felix Zollicoffer with whom he had fought with in Florida against the Seminole. The company became part of the 20th Tennessee Infantry and Battle was appointed as its colonel. The regiment joined a brigade commanded by Battle's good friend Zollicoffer. During the Battle of Mill Springs Zollicoffer was killed and Battle's son Lieutenant Joel Battle Jr., who was serving as the regimental adjutant, was wounded. In the Battle of Shiloh, Colonel Battle lost two of his sons, Joel Jr. and William. The Colonel was wounded and captured while looking for his sons – William's body was never found and Joel Jr. was discovered by John Calvin Lewis, a Union soldier who was recruited into Beta Theta Pi by Joel Jr. at Miami University. Out of respect for his brother, Lewis buried Joel Jr. in a personal grave. After his capture the demoralized Battle was brought to Johnson's Island, effectively ending his career in the military.

After being exchanged, Battle was appointed state treasurer of Tennessee, which he occupied until the end of the Civil War. When his son Frank Battle was captured during the war, he was used as leverage by the Union side to force the return of Captain Shad Harris who was under threat of execution as a spy. Joel Allen Battle relented and the prisoner transfer, which was endorsed by President Lincoln, took place. Battle also had to deal with the arrest and imprisoning of his daughter Fannie along with her friend Harriet Booker in Camp Chase on suspicion of her being a Confederate spy.

== Later life ==
After the war, Battle was appointed superintendent of the Tennessee State Prison. He retained the position until his death, caused by severe dysentery, on August 23, 1872.
