= David Lillard =

American lawyer

Tennessee State Treasurer
- Incumbent
- Assumed office January 15, 2009
- Governor: Phil Bredesen; Bill Haslam; Bill Lee
- Preceded by: Dale Sims

Personal details
- Born: November 23, 1953 (age 72) Fort Rucker, Alabama, U.S.
- Party: Republican
- Education: University of Memphis (BA, JD); University of Florida (LLM)

David H. Lillard Jr. (born 1953) is an American lawyer, politician and government official. A Republican, he serves as the state treasurer for the state of Tennessee.

== Early life ==
David Lillard was born circa 1953 in Fort Rucker, Alabama. He graduated from the University of Memphis, where he earned a BA and a JD. He earned a master of laws in taxation from the University of Florida in 1983.

== Legal career ==
Lillard was a lawyer for almost three decades. According to the National Association of State Auditors, Comptrollers, and Treasurers, he practiced "tax, securities, municipal finance and health regulatory law."

== Political career ==
=== County Commissioner ===
A Republican, Lillard was a Shelby County Commissioner until 2009, was Chairman of the Shelby County Board of Commissioners and also served as president of the Tennessee County Commissioners Association.

=== State Treasurer ===
In 2009, after Republicans gained control of the Tennessee General Assembly (the state legislature), the legislature elected Lillard as the Tennessee State Treasurer. He was subsequently re-elected to several two-year terms, most recently in January 2025.

As State Treasurer, Lillard oversees the Tennessee Department of Treasury, which is responsible for many of the financial operations of State government. The Tennessee Treasury administers the State's Retirement Program, RetireReadyTN, which combines the state's pension plan, the Tennessee Consolidated Retirement System (TCRS), and the State's Deferred Compensation plan. The Tennessee Treasury also administers the TNStars College Savings 529 Program; the Tennessee Financial Literacy Commission; ABLE TN; the state's Unclaimed Property program, and the Criminal Injuries Compensation Fund.

Lillard worked with the 108th Tennessee General Assembly on legislation to stabilize TCRS employer costs and pension liabilities. The legislation required all new state and higher education employees and K-12 public-school teachers hired on or after July 1, 2014, to participate in the Hybrid Retirement Plan, which included defined benefit and deferred compensation components that reduced costs. The Hybrid Plan is a combination of a defined benefit plan provided by TCRS and a 401(k) deferred compensation plan.

Lillard supported legislation in 2014 that required local governments in Tennessee that do not participate in TCRS to annually fund 100% of the "actuarially determined annual required contribution." The Tennessee General Assembly unanimously passed the legislation in April 2014. Local governments that participated in TCRS were already required to make 100% contributions.

Lillard also served as President of the National Executive Committee of the National Association of State Auditors, Comptrollers and Treasurers (NASACT) through 2017. He served as President of the National Association of State Treasurers (NAST) in 2015 and represented NAST on the Governmental Accounting Standards Advisory Council (GASAC) from 2016-2019. He was a trustee of the Financial Accounting Foundation (FAF) from 2019-2023.

== Personal life ==
Lillard has a wife, Patricia Newton, and three children. He resides in Shelby County, and he is a member of the United Methodist Church.

Political offices
Preceded by Dale Sims	Treasurer of Tennessee; 2009–present	Incumbent
