= Motor carrier =

Motor carrier may refer to:

- Motor carrier (designation), a company which employs large semi-truck and bus drivers
- Motor Carrier, an English automobile produced in 1904

== See also ==
- Federal Motor Carrier Safety Administration, an agency of the United States Department of Transportation
- Motor Carrier Act (disambiguation)
