= Paul Bailey (politician) =

American politician (born 1968)

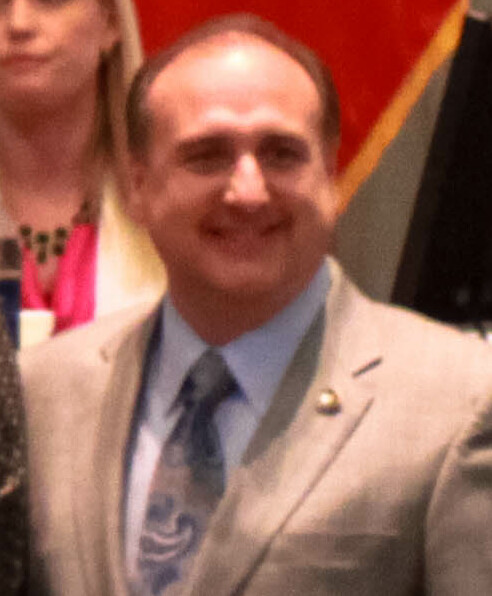
- Bailey in 2014

Member of the Tennessee Senate from the 15th district
- Incumbent
- Assumed office January 13, 2015
- Preceded by: Charlotte Burks

Personal details
- Born: Paul Edward Bailey; March 4, 1968 (age 58)
- Party: Republican
- Spouse: Amy Bailey
- Children: 3
- Education: White County High School
- Alma mater: Tennessee Tech University

Paul Edward Bailey (born March 4, 1968) is an American politician. He serves as a Republican member of the Tennessee Senate, where he represents District 15.

== Early life ==
Paul Bailey was born on March 4, 1968. He was educated at White County High School in Sparta, Tennessee. He graduated from Tennessee Tech.

== Career ==
Bailey has been the general manager and vice president of Charles Bailey Trucking, Inc., for over three decades. He is also a farmer.

Bailey serves as a Republican member of the Tennessee Senate, where he represents District 15, encompassing Cumberland, Jackson, Overton, Bledsoe, Putnam, and White Counties.

Bailey serves as the vice chairman of the National Reined Cow Horse Association.

In 2024, Bailey and Cookeville state Representative Ryan Williams cosponsored a resolution allowing Tennessee localities to arm public school teachers. The measure passed.

== Personal life ==
With his wife Amy, Bailey has three children. They reside in White County, Tennessee.
