= 20th Tennessee Infantry Regiment =

- Flag of Tennessee
- Active: 1861–1863
- Country: Confederate States of America
- Allegiance: Confederate States Army
- Branch: Infantry
- Type: Regiment
- Engagements: American Civil War: Battle of Mill Springs; Battle of Shiloh; Battle of Murfreesboro; Battle of Chickamauga; Battle of Chattanooga (Missionary Ridge); Battle of Kennesaw Mountain: Battle of Atlanta; Battle of Franklin; Battle of Nashville

Commanders
- Notable commanders: Col. Joel A. Battle; Col. Thomas B. Smith

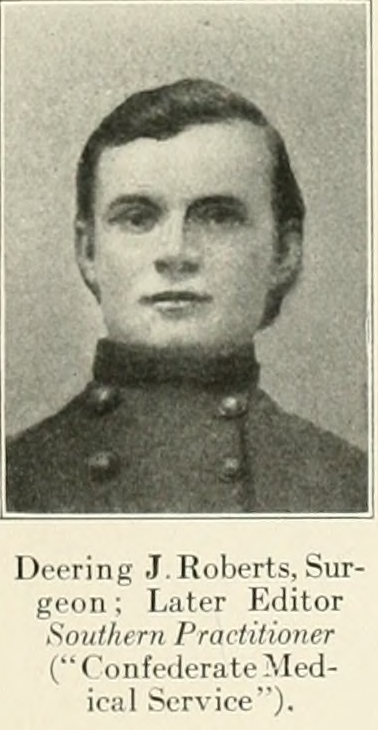
Deering J. Roberts, Surgeon, 20th Tenn. Regt.

The 20th Regiment, Tennessee Infantry was an infantry regiment from Tennessee that served in the Confederate States Army during the American Civil War. Notable battles that the regiment was engaged in include the Battle of Mill Springs and the Battle of Chickamauga.

== See also ==
- List of Tennessee Confederate Civil War units
