= Thomas Benton Smith =

Confederate Army general (1838–1923)

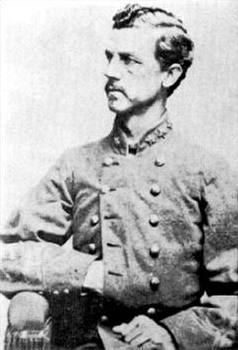
- Born: February 24, 1838; Mechanicsville, Tennessee
- Died: May 21, 1923 (aged 85); Savannah, Georgia
- Burial place: Mount Olivet Cemetery; Nashville, Tennessee
- Military career
- Allegiance: Confederate States of America
- Branch: Confederate States Army
- Service years: 1861–1865
- Rank: Brigadier General
- Commands: 20th Tennessee Infantry Regiment; Tyler's/Smith's Brigade
- Conflicts: American Civil War: Battle of Mill Springs; Battle of Shiloh; Battle of Stones River; Battle of Chickamauga; Atlanta campaign; Battle of Nashville

Thomas Benton Smith (February 24, 1838 – May 21, 1923) was a brigadier general in the Confederate States Army during the American Civil War.

== Early life ==
Smith was born in Mechanicsville, Tennessee. He attended the local schools before enrolling in the Nashville Military Academy. He received an appointment to the United States Military Academy in West Point, New York, but resigned and returned home. He subsequently took a position working for the Nashville & Decatur Railroad.

== American Civil War ==
With Tennessee's Ordinance of Secession and the outbreak of the Civil War, Smith enlisted in the Confederate Army in the 20th Tennessee Infantry Regiment and was elected a second lieutenant. He first saw combat action at the Battle of Mill Springs in January 1862, and in April of that same year participated in the Battle of Shiloh. Later in the year, after being promoted to colonel of the 20th Tennessee and assigned command of a small brigade, he was part of the Confederate forces that unsuccessfully tried to seize the Union post at Baton Rouge, Louisiana. Confederate Army commander John C. Breckinridge remarked in his official report that Smith "moved against the enemy in fine style."

At the end of the year, he fought in the Battle of Stones River, where he suffered a serious wound that put him out of action for much of 1863. After his recuperation, Smith resumed field duties, but was again wounded at the Battle of Chickamauga in September. After another lengthy recovery period, he returned to action during the 1864 Atlanta campaign. He was promoted to brigadier general on July 29, 1864, and commanded an infantry brigade (Tyler's Tennessee Brigade), assigned to Bates Division, Hardee's Army Corps in the Army of Tennessee comprising the 2nd, 10th, and 20th Tennessee, the 37th Georgia, the 30th, 37th, and 50th Tennessee, consolidated, and the 4th Georgia battalion of sharpshooters. His first action as a general officer on the extreme left of the Confederate flank at the Battle of Utoy Creek, he personally led his brigade in a charge against attacking Union soldiers capturing some 30 Union soldiers and the colors of the 8th Tennessee Infantry and 112th Illinois Infantry. The unit was cited in the OR by his corps commander, Lieut. Gen. Stephen D. Lee, to whom Bates Division was attached for duty. Smith led his brigade in an assault at the Battle of Jonesborough, however the terrific fire from the Federal entrenched troops, required them to withdraw to a gully for protection during the assault on August 30, 1864 and they were unable to dislodge the Federal Army of the Tennessee.

His military career ended at the Battle of Nashville on December 16. Smith surrendered during the battle. After Smith had surrendered and been disarmed, Union Colonel William L. McMillen, whose brigade had suffered heavily in an engagement with Smith's Brigade, reportedly berated and then attacked the Confederate general, now a disarmed prisoner, with Smith's own sword (one source says "wantonly and repeatedly"). Smith's resultant brain injuries were so severe that for a time it was feared he would not live. Confederate General William B. Bate in his report stated, "General T. B. Smith, commanding Tyler's brigade, and Finley's, bore themselves with heroic courage both through good and evil fortune, always executing orders with zeal and alacrity, and bearing themselves in the face of the enemy as became reputations which each had heretofore bravely won." Held at Johnson's Island in Ohio and later at Fort Warren in Massachusetts, Smith was not released until July 24, 1865.

== Post-war ==
Smith recovered enough to be able to do some railroad work after the Civil War. He ran for a seat in the U.S. Congress in 1870, but lost the election. However, lingering effects of the savage beating caused permanent damage, and Smith spent much his last 47 years in an insane asylum in Nashville, emerging occasionally for army reunions and other social events.

He was buried beside many of his former comrades in the Confederate Circle of Mount Olivet Cemetery in Nashville. He outlived McMillen by 21 years.

== See also ==
- List of American Civil War generals (Confederate)
