= Tennessee State Treasurer =

Tennessee constitutional officer

Tennessee State Treasurer is a constitutional officer of the state of Tennessee. The incumbent is elected to supervise the state Department of the Treasury for a term of two years by a vote of both houses of the Tennessee General Assembly. The current office holder is David Lillard.

== History ==
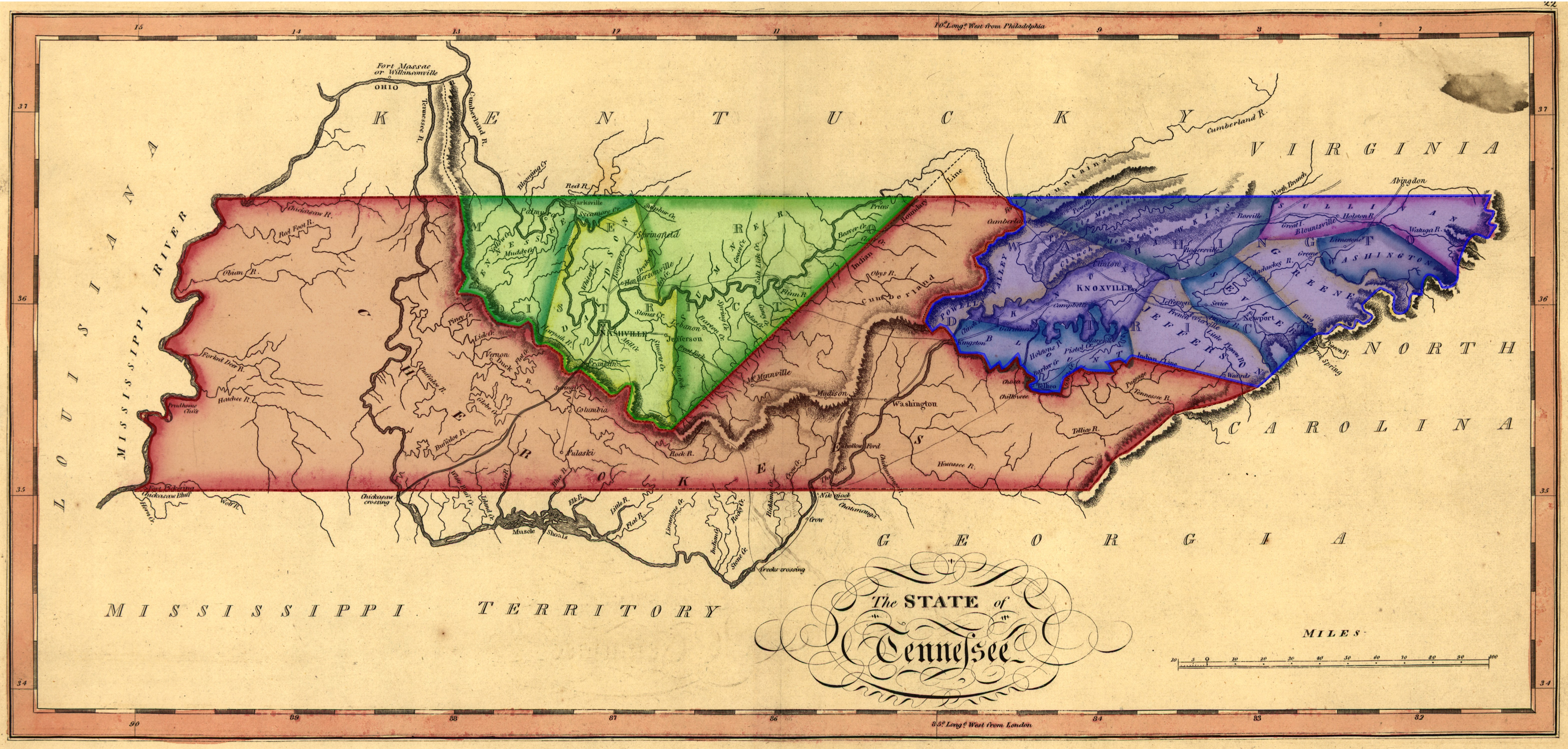
Tennessee around 1810, emphasizing native land, Washington District (in purple) and Mero District (in green).

Prior to Tennessee statehood, Daniel Smith acted as territorial treasurer from 1792 to 1794. In 1794, a system of district treasurers was established, one for the District of Washington and Hamilton (East Tennessee) and one for the District of Mero, Robertson and Winchester (Middle and West Tennessee). This separation of responsibility was necessitated by the fact that much of the Southwest Territory (future Tennessee) west of North Carolina was still controlled by native American Indian tribes (see map).

In 1827, an East Tennessee District office was established in Knoxville and the Mero District was separated into an office in Nashville and a new West Tennessee District office in Jackson. In 1836, treasurer became a statewide office elected by the legislature and based in Nashville.

== District treasurers ==
The following served as district treasurers for the Southwest Territory (1794–1796) and Tennessee (1796–1836).

=== Washington and Hamilton or Eastern District ===
- Landon Carter, 1794–1800
- John Maclin, 1800–1803
- Thomas McCorry, 1803–1815
- Matthew Nelson, 1815–1827
- Miller Francis, 1827–1836

=== Miro or Mero District ===
- Howell Tatum, 1794–1796
- William Black, 1796–1797
- Robert Searcy, 1797–1803
- Thomas Crutcher, 1803–1836

=== Western District ===
- James Caruthers, 1827–1836

== Statewide treasurers ==
The following have served as Tennessee State Treasurer since 1836.

- Miller Francis, 1836–1843
- Matthew Nelson, 1843–1845
- Robert B. Turner, 1845–1847
- Anthony Dibrell, 1847–1855
- Granville C. Torbett, 1855–1857
- William F. McGregor, 1857–1861
- William F. McGregor, 1861–1863 (Confederate)
- Joel A. Battle, 1863–1865 (Confederate)
- Robert L. Stanford, 1865–1866
- John R. Henry, 1866–1868
- William H. Stillwell, 1868–1869
- James E. Rust, 1869–1871
- William Morrow, 1871–1877
- Marshall T. Polk, 1877–1883
- Atha Thomas, 1883–1885
- James W. Thomas, 1885–1886
- Atha Thomas, 1886–1889
- Mansfield F. "Manse" House, 1889–1893
- Edward B. Craig, 1893–1901
- Reau E. Folk, 1901–1911
- George Thomas Taylor, 1911–1913
- William P. Hickerson, 1913–1915
- Porter Dunlap, 1915–1919
- Hill McAlister, 1919–1927
- John F. Nolan, 1927–1931
- Hill McAlister, 1931–1933
- James J. Bean, 1933–1937
- Grover Keaton, 1937–1939
- John W. Harton, 1939–1945
- Cecil C. Wallace, 1945–1948
- J. (James) Floyd Murrey, 1948–1949
- William Norfleet Estes Sr., 1949–1953
- James B. Walker Sr., January 1953
- James B. Walker Jr., January–July 1953 (Acting)
- James B. Walker Sr., July 1953 – January 1955
- Ramon Davis, 1955–1963
- James H. Alexander Sr., January 1963 – June 1964
- Nobel Caudill, June–October 1964 (Acting)
- James H. Alexander Sr., October 1964 – January 1967
- Charles E. "Charlie" Worley Jr., 1967–1971
- Thomas A. Wiseman Jr., 1971–1974
- Harlan Mathews, 1974–1987
- Steve Adams, 1987–2003
- Dale Sims, 2003–2009
- David H. Lillard Jr., 2009–Present
