= Raynella Leath =

American woman convicted of murder (1948–2026)

Raynella Dossett Leath
- Born: Raynella Bernardene Large; October 25, 1948; Pigeon Forge, Tennessee, U.S.
- Died: April 4, 2026 (aged 77); Knox County, Tennessee, U.S.
- Occupation: Former registered nurse
- Criminal charge: First degree murder
- Criminal status: Not guilty
- Spouse(s): Ed Dossett (1970–1992; deceased); David Leath (1993–2003; deceased)

Raynella Dossett Leath (October 25, 1948 – April 4, 2026) was an American woman who was released in 2017 from a life sentence at the Tennessee Prison for Women in Nashville for the 2003 murder of her husband David Leath. Prosecutors alleged that she shot her husband in the head, and then attempted to stage his murder as a suicide. The judge, in the third trial, directed a verdict in favor of the defendant on May 10, 2017. "The record taken as a whole does not support a finding of sufficient evidence," Judge Summers said. "The state has failed to meet its burden."

== Early life ==
Raynella Bernardene Large was born on October 25, 1948, to Annie Irene (née Owens) and Dewey Ernest Large, a nuclear scientist and raised in Oak Ridge, Tennessee. She attended Oak Ridge High School and graduated in 1966. She went on to become a registered nurse, and she married her first husband, Ed Dossett, the Knox County District Attorney, in 1970. The couple had three children, and the family lived on a farm west of Knoxville.

She held a Tennessee social work license which she agreed to surrender after she was charged with murder.

== Death of first husband ==
On July 9, 1992, Ed Dossett, who at that time was in the late stages of terminal cancer, was found dead in the couple's corral, supposedly having been trampled by cattle. Despite the medical examiner's suspicions about a double indemnity clause in Ed's life insurance policy, his death was initially ruled to be an agricultural accident by the first medical examiner who autopsied him. Six months after his death, Raynella married her second husband, a retired barber, David Leath. Dossett's death was reinvestigated in 2006 after David Leath's death.

== Death of second husband ==
On March 13, 2003, Raynella found the body of her second husband David Leath in their bedroom. She called 9-1-1 and reported her husband's death as a suicide. The physical evidence suggested that three shots were fired from a .38 caliber Colt revolver, but police argued that it was the second shot that killed David Leath. Following this incident, authorities re-investigated the death of Ed Dossett. A new medical examiner revealed that the morphine levels in his system were "so extraordinarily high it is unlikely that any human could function in an ambulatory manner or continue to live". In 2006, Raynella was charged with administering an overdose of morphine. Two years later, in 2008, she was charged with the first-degree murder of David Leath.

== Attempted murder charge ==
In 1995, after the death of her first husband, Raynella discovered that he had an affair with another woman that resulted in the birth of a child. Her late husband's mistress, Kaye Clift Walker, was in the middle of a divorce with Steve Walker; the mistress revealed to Raynella that she had an affair with Dossett and that he had fathered one of her children. Soon after, Raynella lured Steve Walker to her farm, where she allegedly opened fire on Steve Walker until she ran out of bullets. She was charged with attempted murder, but plea bargained to a lesser charge of aggravated assault. She served six years on probation and her criminal record was expunged.

== Murder trial ==
In May 2009, Raynella Dossett Leath went on trial for the murder of her second husband, David. She maintained that his death was a suicide. After hours of jury deliberation, there was no verdict and the judge declared a hung jury.

A retrial began in January 2010. The prosecutor began his opening statement by playing Raynella's 911 call, then explaining why authorities believed David's death was murder rather than suicide. The prosecutor said three shots were fired and the second shot killed David instantly. He also told the jury that David was also drugged with a combination similar to that used for patients undergoing surgery. In this trial, Raynella's defense argued that David's death was in fact a homicide, but that Raynella had an alibi. After a day of deliberation, the jury had not reached a unanimous verdict. However, on January 25, 2010, Raynella Dossett Leath was convicted of first-degree murder and was automatically sentenced to between 51 years and life in prison. Immediately following her conviction, the charges relating to her first husband's death were dropped.

== Retrial and release ==
Following her conviction, Raynella appealed for a new trial on the basis of Judge Richard Baumgartner's judicial misconduct relative to his drug use. She cited the murders of Channon Christian and Christopher Newsom case, which resulted in all of the defendants' convictions being overturned. Raynella's petition also accused the police of mishandling key evidence. Two witnesses gave statements that the gun, which had been photographed on the bed in a position that prosecutors said looked staged, had been removed from the scene by police and then put back before the photo was taken. She was released in May 2016 pending a retrial in January 2017. At the retrial, the defense argued that David Leath had in fact died by suicide, presenting evidence that he had recently been diagnosed with dementia and that the drugs in his system were not enough to incapacitate him. Special judge Paul Summers waited for all evidence to be presented and then declared that insufficient evidence had been presented that Raynella was the murderer and did not permit the jury to decide the case.

Leath died on April 4, 2026, at the age of 77.

== In popular culture ==
True crime author Diane Fanning published Her Deadly Web in 2012 about the Raynella Dossett Leath case. Her case was first profiled on Deadly Women on November 18, 2011, and subsequently on Snapped on June 17, 2012. On September 30, 2017, the TV show 48 Hours profiled her and her 2017 murder trial in the episode "The Widow on Solway Road". The title references the location of her farm, in Knoxville.

Her case featured on the episode "High Society Sins" of Deadly Sins on January 26, 2013.
