= Bob Winkel =

American football player (born 1955)

No. 71
- Position: Defensive tackle

Personal information
- Born: October 23, 1955 (age 71); Paducah, Kentucky, U.S.
- Listed height: 6 ft 4 in (1.93 m)
- Listed weight: 253 lb (115 kg)

Career information
- High school: Oak Ridge (Oak Ridge, Tennessee)
- College: Kentucky
- NFL draft: 1979: 7th round, 181st overall pick

Career history
- New York Jets (1979–1980)
- Stats at Pro Football Reference

Robert Alexander Winkel (born October 23, 1955) is an American former professional football player who was a defensive tackle for the New York Jets of the National Football League (NFL). He played college football at Kentucky.
