= Ryan Williams (American politician) =

American politician (born 1974)

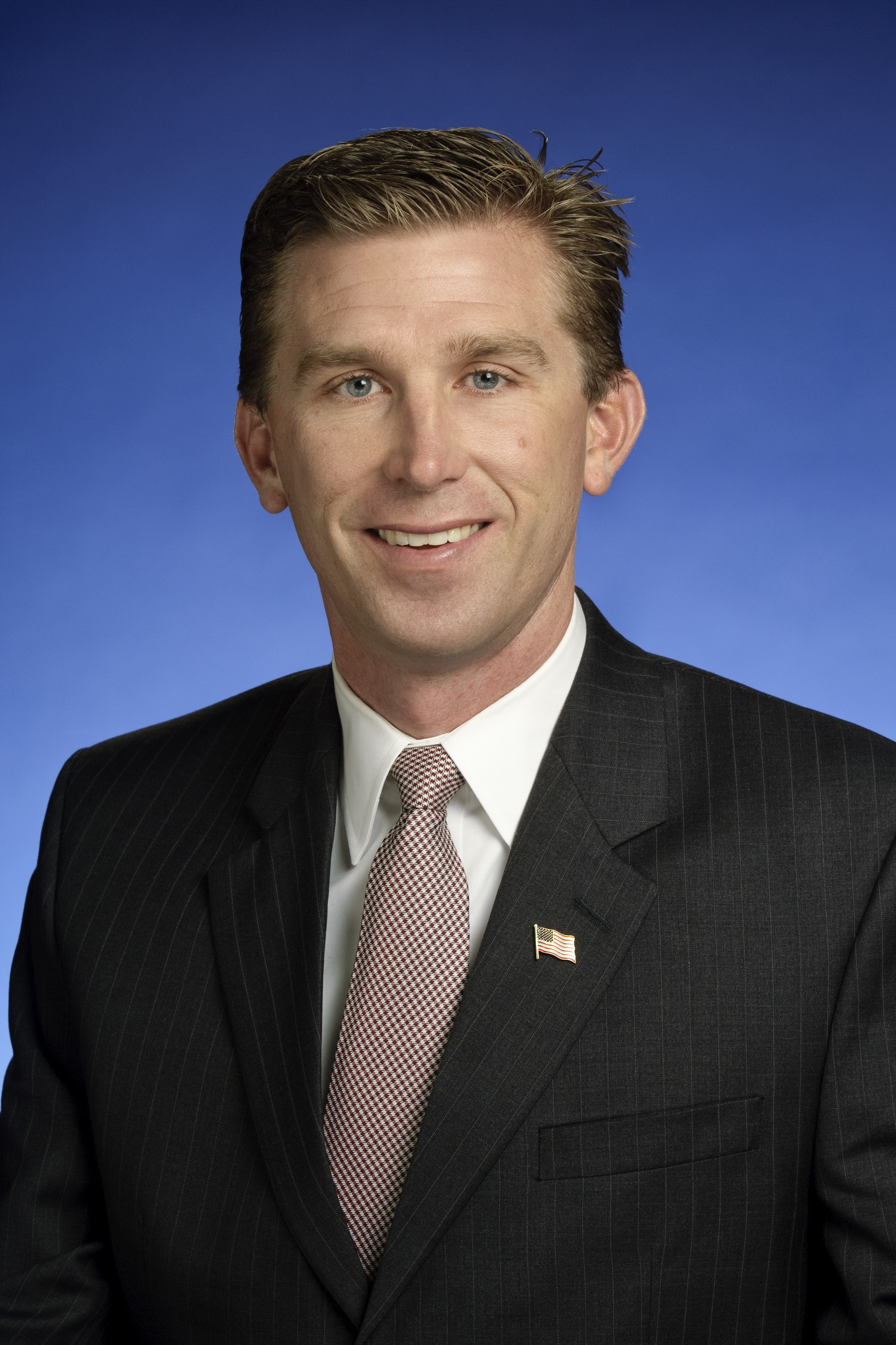

Member of the Tennessee House of Representatives from the 42nd district
- Incumbent
- Assumed office January 11, 2011
- Preceded by: Henry Fincher

Personal details
- Born: June 1, 1973 (age 53) Kingsport, Tennessee, U.S.
- Party: Republican
- Education: Carson-Newman University (BS)

Ryan Williams (born June 1, 1974) is an American politician and a Republican member of the Tennessee House of Representatives representing the 42nd district since January 2011. In 2016, he was elected by his colleagues to serve as the Republican Caucus Chairman.

== Biography ==
Williams was born in Kingsport, Tennessee, and was a native of Blountville also with Sullivan County, Tennessee where he graduated from Sullivan Central High School.

Williams earned his BS in biology from Carson–Newman College (now Carson–Newman University). While in attendance, he was a stand-out athlete on the University's Division II Men's Soccer team.

In 2023, Williams supported a resolution to expel three Democratic lawmakers from the legislature for violating decorum rules.

In 2024, Williams and Cookeville state Senator Paul Bailey cosponsored a resolution allowing Tennessee localities to arm public school teachers. The measure passed.

== Elections ==
- In 2016, Williams ran unopposed in the August 4, 2016 Republican Primary and won the November 7, 2016 General Election with 17,486 votes (74.50%) against Democratic nominee Amos Powers.
- In 2014, Williams was unopposed for the August 7, 2014 Republican Primary and won the November 4, 2014 General election with 10,054 votes (71.8%) against Democratic nominee Mike Walsh.
- In 2012, Williams was unopposed for the August 2, 2012 Republican Primary, winning with 4,772 votes, and won the November 6, 2012 General election with 15,049 votes (71.4%) against Democratic nominee Thomas Willoughby.
- In 2010, Williams challenged District 42 incumbent Democratic Representative Henry Fincher. Williams ran in the August 5, 2010 Republican Primary, winning with 3,941 votes (71.0%), and won the November 2, 2010 General election with 9,222 votes (55.3%) against Representative Fincher.
