= Tennessee's 15th Senate district =

American legislative district

Tennessee's 15th State Senate district
Senator
Paul Bailey; R–Sparta
- Demographics: 91% White; 1% Black; 4% Hispanic; 1% Asian; 3% Multiracial
- Population (2022): 207,075

Tennessee's 15th Senate district is one of 33 districts in the Tennessee Senate. It has been represented by Republican Paul Bailey since 2014, succeeding retiring Democrat Charlotte Burks.

== Geography ==
District 15 covers much of rural Middle Tennessee, including all of Cumberland, Jackson, Putnam, Smith, Van Buren, and White Counties. Communities in the district include Cookeville, Crossville, Sparta, Fairfield Glade, Lake Tansi Village, Algood, Monterey, and Gainesboro.

The district is mostly entirely in Tennessee's 6th congressional district.

== Recent election results ==
Tennessee Senators are elected to staggered four-year terms, with odd-numbered districts holding elections in midterm years and even-numbered districts holding elections in presidential years.

=== 2018 ===
2018 Tennessee Senate election, District 15
Party	Candidate	Votes	%
Republican	Paul Bailey (incumbent)	48,919	73.6
Democratic	Angela Hedgecough	17,512	26.4
Total votes		66,431	100
Republican hold			

=== 2014 ===
2014 Tennessee Senate election, District 15
Primary election
Party	Candidate	Votes	%
Republican	Paul Bailey	13,141	48.4
Republican	Matt Swallows	12,577	46.3
Republican	Gary Steakley	1,453	5.3
Total votes		27,171	100
General election
Republican	Paul Bailey	33,674	73.3
Democratic	Betty Vaudt	10,263	22.3
Independent	William Draper	2,022	4.4
Total votes		45,959	100
Republican gain from Democratic			

=== Federal and statewide results ===
Year	Office	Results
2020	President	Trump 76.1 – 22.4%
2016	President	Trump 74.6 – 22.2%
2012	President	Romney 68.7 – 29.8%
2012	Senate	Corker 72.0 – 22.7%

=== 1998 election ===
In 1998, the district was the site of a highly unusual election. Incumbent Democrat Tommy Burks was expected to coast to re-election over Republican Byron (Low Tax) Looper until, in October 1998, Looper shot and killed Burks on his own farm. Tennessee state law mandated that deceased candidates be removed from the ballot, but candidates who had been charged with a felony but not convicted were allowed to remain, meaning that Looper's name was the only one on the ballot a month later. However, friends of Burks as well as local politicians launched a write-in campaign for Charlotte Burks, Tommy Burks' widow. Although Burks herself never campaigned for the seat, the write-in effort was overwhelmingly successful, ultimately defeating Looper 95-5%. She went on to serve for 4 terms, while Looper was sentenced to life in prison.

1998 Tennessee Senate election, District 15
Party	Candidate	Votes	%
Democratic	Charlotte Burks (write-in)	30,252	95.2
Republican	Byron (Low Tax) Looper	1,531	4.8
Total votes		31,783	100
Democratic hold			
