= Henry Fincher =

American politician (born 1969)

Member of the Tennessee House of Representatives from the 42nd district
- In office January 9, 2007 – January 11, 2011
- Preceded by: Jere Hargrove
- Succeeded by: Ryan Williams

Personal details
- Born: April 3, 1969 (age 57) Cookeville, Tennessee, U.S.
- Party: Democratic
- Spouse: Missy
- Children: 1
- Education: University of Tennessee (BA); Harvard Law School (JD)
- Occupation: Politician; lawyer
- Website: House website

Henry Fincher (born April 3, 1969) is an American politician and lawyer.

Born in Cookeville, Tennessee, Fincher went to the University of Tennessee and Harvard Law School. He served in the Tennessee House of Representatives from 2007 to 2011 as a Democrat. He represented the 42nd district.
