= Don Sundquist =

American politician (1936–2023)

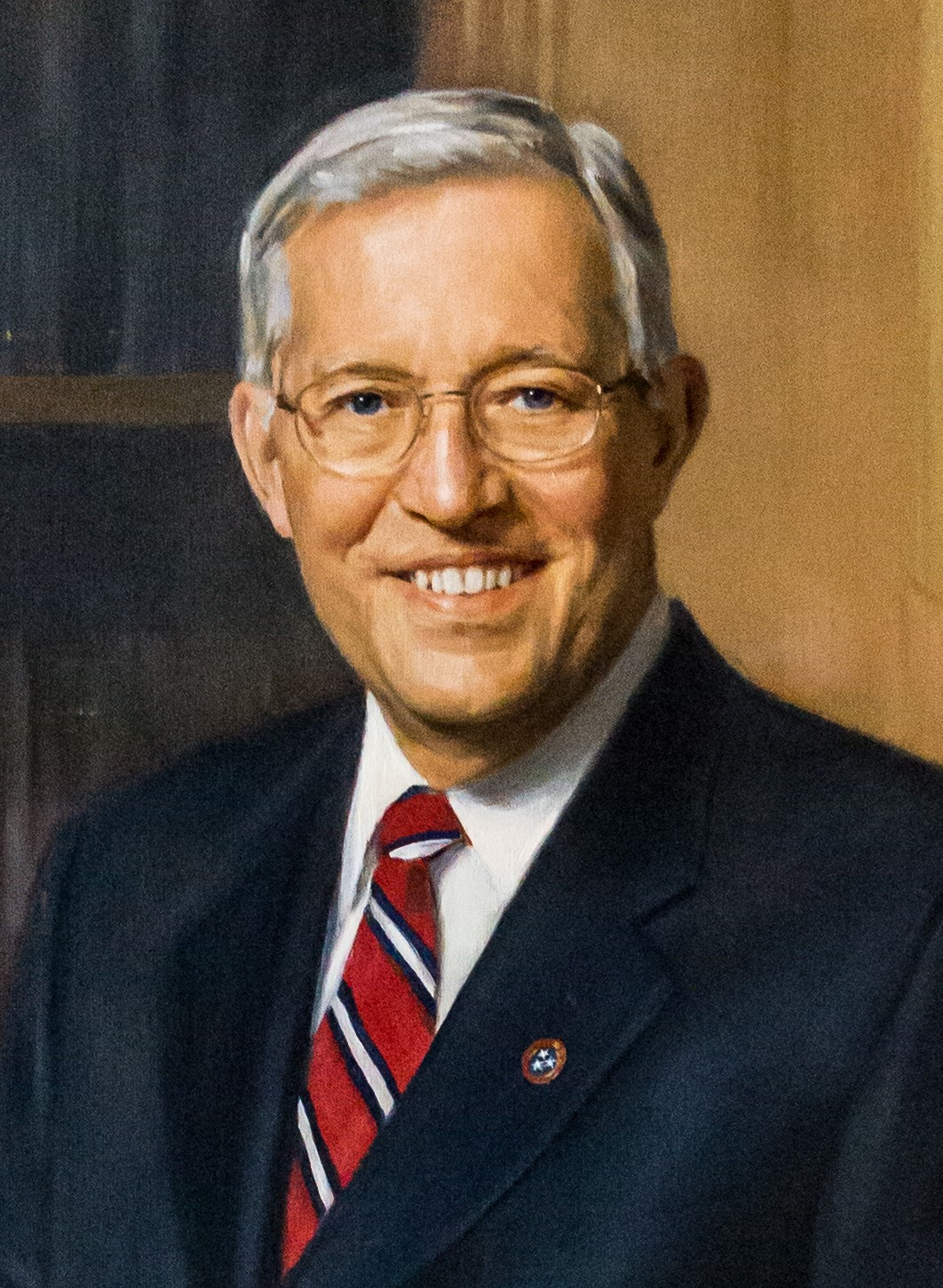

47th Governor of Tennessee
- In office January 21, 1995 – January 18, 2003
- Lieutenant: John Wilder
- Preceded by: Ned McWherter
- Succeeded by: Phil Bredesen

Member of the U.S. House of Representatives from Tennessee's 7th district
- In office January 3, 1983 – January 3, 1995
- Preceded by: Robin Beard (Redistricting)
- Succeeded by: Ed Bryant

Personal details
- Born: Donald Kenneth Sundquist; March 15, 1936 Moline, Illinois, U.S.
- Died: August 27, 2023 (aged 87) Memphis, Tennessee, U.S.
- Party: Republican
- Spouse: Martha Swanson (m. 1959)
- Children: 3
- Education: Augustana College (BA)

Military service
- Branch/service: United States Navy
- Years of service: 1957–1963
- Battles/wars: Vietnam War

Donald Kenneth Sundquist (March 15, 1936 – August 27, 2023) was an American businessman and politician who served as the 47th governor of Tennessee from 1995 to 2003.

Prior to his governorship, he represented Tennessee's 7th congressional district in the United States House of Representatives from 1983 to 1995. He was a member of the Republican Party.

== Early life ==
Sundquist was born on March 15, 1936, in Moline, Illinois, the son of Kenneth and Louise (Rohren) Sundquist. His father was of Swedish descent, while his mother was of German descent.

After graduating from Moline High School in 1953, he attended Augustana College in Rock Island, Illinois, obtaining his B.A. in business administration in 1957. He was a member of the Rho Nu Delta fraternity at Augustana. He served in the United States Navy from 1957 to 1963, including two years on active duty.

Sundquist joined Jostens in 1961, and initially worked at the company's plants in Princeton, Illinois, and Owatonna, Minnesota. In 1962, he was transferred to the company plant in Shelbyville, Tennessee, where he became plant manager. He left Jostens in 1972 and moved to Memphis, where he established an advertising and printing firm, Graphic Sales of America.

After moving to Tennessee, Sundquist became active in Republican Party politics. He served as an organizer of the Barry Goldwater 1964 presidential campaign. He served as Chair of the national Young Republicans from 1971 to 1973, and chair of the Shelby County Republican Party from 1975 to 1977. He was a delegate to the 1976 Republican National Convention and the 1980 Republican National Convention, and managed the presidential campaign of Howard Baker during the 1980 election cycle.

== U.S. House of Representatives ==
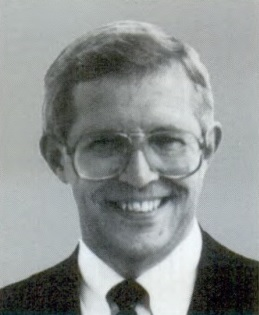
Congressional portrait

In 1982, Sundquist sought the seat of Congressman Robin Beard, who was retiring to run against Jim Sasser for the U.S. Senate. Beard's district, the 6th, had been renumbered as the 7th following redistricting. In the general election, Sundquist edged Bob Clement, son of former Governor Frank G. Clement, by just over 1,000 votes out of over 145,000 votes cast. He would never face another contest nearly that close; he was unopposed for reelection in 1984 and was reelected three more times after that with almost no difficulty.

While in Congress, Sundquist established a conservative voting record, and was popular with conservative-oriented groups such as the National Federation of Independent Business and the American Conservative Union. He was a member of the House Ways and Means Committee, serving on the Subcommittee on Trade and the Subcommittee on Select Revenue Measures. He was also a member of the Republican Task Force on Trade, and the Republican Task Force on Ethics Reform.

== Governor of Tennessee ==
=== First term ===
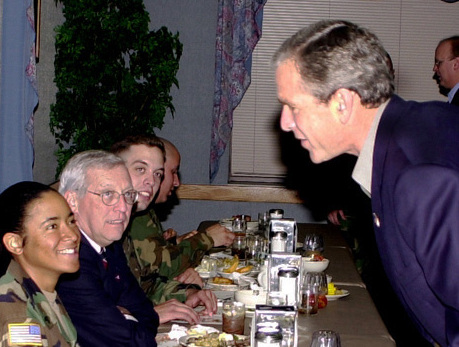
Sundquist with President George W. Bush visiting a combat support hospital in November 2001

In 1994, Sundquist ran for governor of Tennessee in the race to replace the Democratic incumbent, Ned McWherter, who was term-limited. He easily won the nomination, winning over 80% of the vote in the primary, and faced the Democratic nominee, Nashville mayor Phil Bredesen, in the general election. Bredesen criticized Sundquist for voting against a minimum wage increase while voting for a congressional pay raise. Sundquist accused Bredesen of flip-flopping on issues such as public funding for abortion and school privatization. On election day, Sundquist won, 807,104 votes to 664,252.

During his first term, Sundquist focused on government efficiency and welfare reform. He signed the "Families First" bill in 1996, which reduced the number of families on welfare from 70,000 to 30,000. He also signed a series of crime-related measures which called for tougher sentences and more focus on victims' rights. In 1996, Sundquist eliminated the state's scandal-ridden Public Service Commission, replacing it with the Tennessee Regulatory Authority. That same year, he created the Department of Children's Services.

=== Second term ===
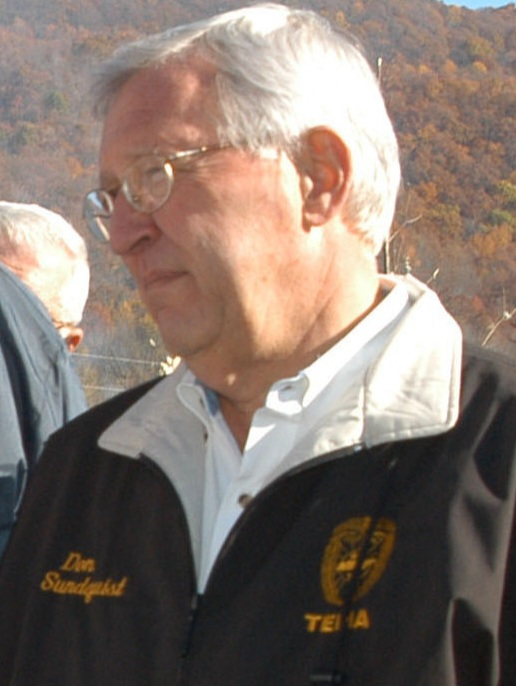
Sundquist in November 2002

In 1998, Sundquist easily won renomination, defeating Memphis realtor Shirley Beck-Vosse, 258,786 votes to 28,951. In the general election, he easily defeated his Democratic opponent, John Jay Hooker, 669,973 votes to 287,790. Shortly after winning reelection in November 1998, Sundquist implemented the ConnectTen program, which made Tennessee the first state in the nation to connect its schools and libraries to the Internet.

During his second term, Sundquist set out to raise more revenue for the state, which had traditionally been one of the lowest-tax jurisdictions in the country. He was concerned that the sales tax, which the state relied upon for much of its revenue, was too unstable, and prevented the state from competing with other Southern states in education and infrastructure. His tax reform plan therefore included a state income tax, the proposal of which had long been a third rail in Tennessee state politics. Many of his political allies turned against him, and anti-income tax street demonstrations were held in Nashville. In July 2001, demonstrators vandalized Sundquist's office, and broke windows in the state capitol when the legislature was considering the income tax measure.

== Post-governorship ==
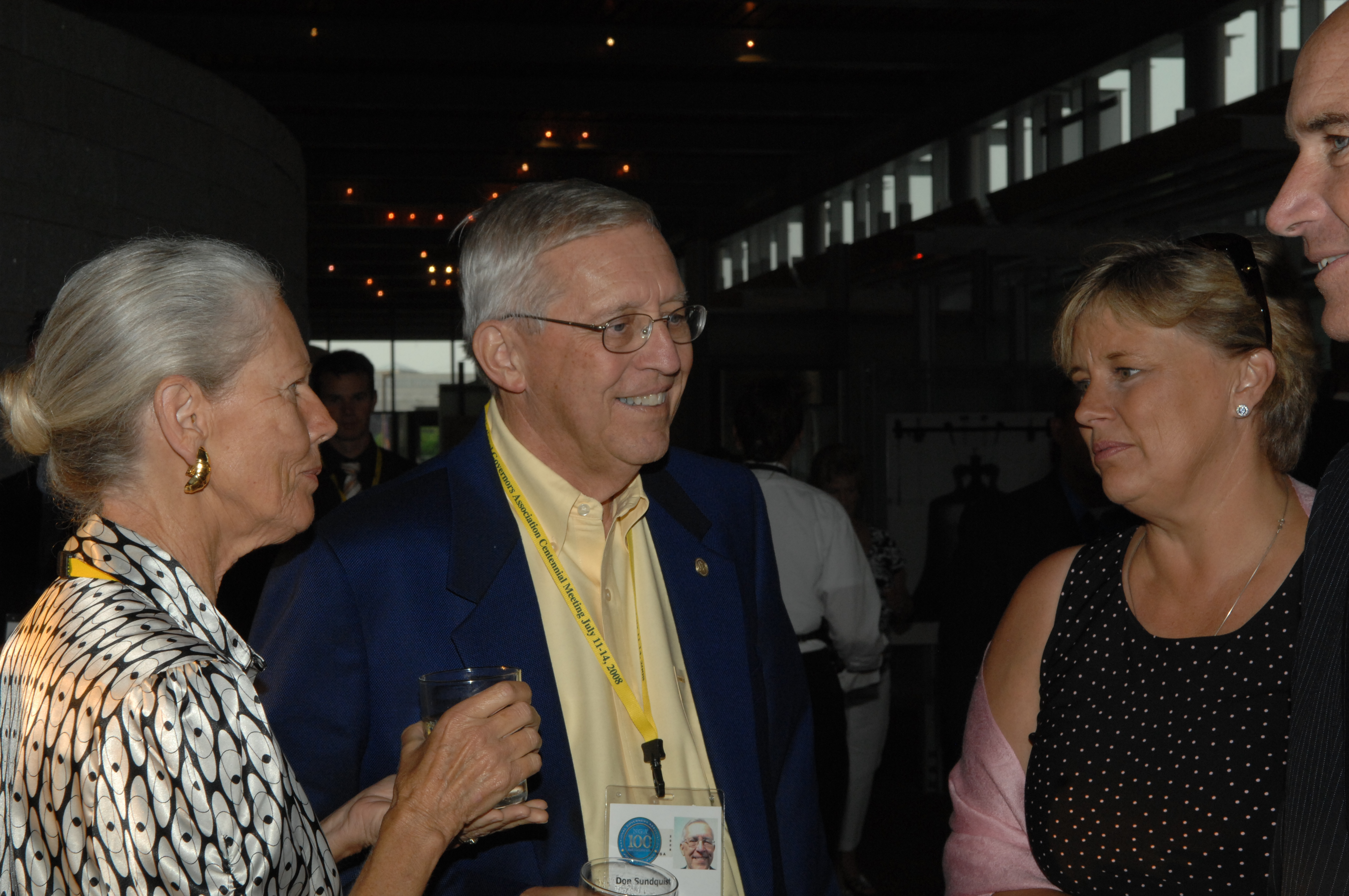
Don Sundquist in 2008

In 2002, toward the end of Sundquist's second term, a Nashville television station, NewsChannel 5, uncovered evidence businesses owned by Sundquist's friends were illegally given no-bid contracts by the state. In December of that year, the FBI raided the offices of Education Networks of America (ENA), founded by Sundquist's friend, Al Ganier, as part of an investigation into whether or not Ganier used his relationship with Sundquist to obtain millions of dollars' worth of state contracts (including the ConnectTenn contract). Ganier eventually pleaded guilty to a misdemeanor charge of unauthorized use of a computer.

In May 2004, a State of Tennessee Labor Department employee, Joanna Ediger, was convicted of rigging a $2 million state contract for Workforce Strategists, a company owned by another Sundquist friend, John Stamps. The following year, Stamps pleaded guilty to four counts of tax evasion and one count of making false statements. U.S. District Judge Karl Forester said Sundquist was the "impetus" for the investigations, although he was never implicated in any wrongdoing, nor were any senior members of his administration.

In July 2005, Sundquist was named head of a national panel on improving Medicaid. The panel was appointed by HHS Secretary Michael Leavitt.

Sundquist served as state vice chair of the John McCain 2008 presidential campaign team.

Sundquist's papers are archived at the University of Tennessee Libraries.

== Personal life and death ==
Sundquist married Martha Swanson in 1959. They had three children.

Don Sundquist died in Memphis on August 27, 2023, at the age of 87, following surgery and a short illness.

== Honors ==
- Order of the Rising Sun, 2nd Class, Gold and Silver Star (2018)

U.S. House of Representatives
Preceded by Ed Jones	Member of the U.S. House of Representatives from Tennessee's 7th congressional district 1983–1995	Succeeded by Ed Bryant
Party political offices
Preceded by Dwight Henry	Republican nominee for Governor of Tennessee; 1994, 1998	Succeeded by Van Hilleary
Political offices
Preceded by Ned McWherter	Governor of Tennessee; 1995–2003	Succeeded by Phil Bredesen
