= Education Networks of America =

Private company

Education Networks of America: ENA by Zayo
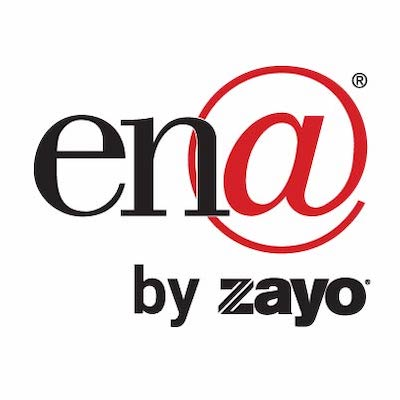
- Industry: Software & Tech Services
- Founded: 1996
- Headquarters: Nashville, Tennessee
- Products: Connectivity, Communication, Cybersecurity, Cloud, Technology Services
- Website: https://www.ena.com

Education Networks of America (ENA by Zayo) is a private company providing internet services to public schools and libraries. It is based in Nashville, Tennessee, in the United States. ENA was founded in 1996.

It is now owned by Zayo Group, a privately held company headquartered in Boulder, Colorado.
