= Charlotte Burks =

American politician (born 1942)

Member of the Tennessee Senate from the 15th district
- In office 1998–2015
- Preceded by: Tommy Burks
- Succeeded by: Paul Bailey

Personal details
- Born: October 3, 1942 (age 84) Gainesboro, Tennessee
- Party: Democratic
- Spouse: Tommy Burks (died 1998)
- Occupation: Farmer, politician

Charlotte Gentry Burks (born October 3, 1942) is a farmer and Democratic party politician in Tennessee who represented the 15th district as State Senator from 1998 until 2015.

Burks was born in 1942 in Gainesboro, Tennessee, and lives in Monterey, Tennessee. She was married to Tommy Burks, a Tennessee State Senator. They had three children together, one of whom is former Putnam County Executive Kim Blaylock. She also has 11 grandchildren.

== Career ==
In 1998, after Burks' husband was assassinated during an election campaign by his Republican challenger Byron (Low-Tax) Looper, her husband's supporters entered her name as a write-in candidate for his seat. Under Tennessee law of the time, if a candidate died 30 days before the election, their name was removed and could not be replaced. The prospect of Looper winning on a technicality led Tommy's supporters to mount a write-in campaign for Charlotte.

Although she did not campaign, family members and friends campaigned extensively on her behalf, and she defeated Looper by a landslide margin, receiving 95% of the vote and becoming the first write-in candidate to win a seat in the Tennessee State Senate. She began her Senate service with the 101st General Assembly. Like her husband, she was a somewhat conservative Democrat even by Tennessee standards of the time.

Burks was reelected in 2002 and 2006 with no substantive opposition. In 2010, when Republicans picked up many seats in the General Assembly, Burks won re-election to a fourth four-year term by a margin of just 183 votes over her Republican opponent, Gary Steakley. Burks carried five of the six counties in the largely rural district, losing only in Cumberland County. An independent candidate placed third in the vote. Steakley challenged the results, claiming irregularities on election day, but a State Senate committee found that there was insufficient evidence to question the outcome.

In the Senate, Burks served as the secretary of the education committee; as a member of the joint study economic development; government operations; select on children and youth; and the environment, conservation, and tourism committees. On September 8, 2013 she announced that she would not run for reelection the following year. On Election Day, the Republican candidate won the seat.

Tennessee Senate
Preceded by Tommy Burks	Member from the 15th district 1999–2015	Succeeded by Paul Bailey
