= Jerry Jared =

American attorney and politician

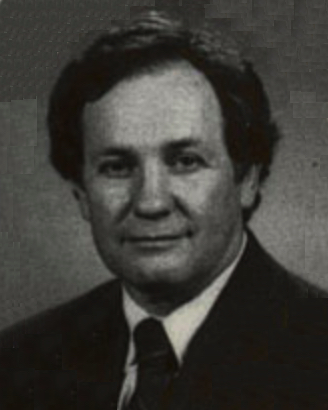
- Official portrait of Jared, 1987

Member of the Tennessee House of Representatives from the 42nd district
- In office January 9, 1979 – January 10, 1989
- Preceded by: Tommy Burks
- Succeeded by: Dwight Henry

Personal details
- Born: Jerry Allen Jared; August 2, 1938 (age 87) Putnam County, Tennessee
- Party: Democratic
- Spouse: Sylvia Ena Fields (m. 1960)
- Children: 2
- Education: Tennessee Tech (BS); YMCA Law School (LLB)

Jerry Allen Jared (born August 2, 1938) is an American attorney and former Democratic Party politician. Jared graduated from the YMCA Law School (now the Nashville School of Law) in June 1966 and was admitted to the Tennessee bar later that year. He was a delegate to Tennessee's 1971 constitutional convention and, in 1978, he defeated independent Bill Baird Griffith to win his first of five terms in the Tennessee House of Representatives. From 1985 until his retirement from the state house in 1989, Jared was the chair of the body's Democratic caucus.

The only son of Clara Olene (née Gill; 1915–2011) and Luke Allen Jared (1915–1986), he married the former Sylvia Ena Fields on September 2, 1960. The couple went on to have two children: a son, Matthew, and a daughter, Jennifer.

In 2008, the Tennessee General Assembly passed and Governor Phil Bredesen signed into law a bill to name a portion of Tennessee State Route 111 in Putnam County "Jerry A. Jared Highway."

Tennessee House of Representatives
Preceded by Tommy Burks	Tennessee State Representative from the 42nd District; 1979–1989	Succeeded by Dwight Henry
