= Motor Carrier Act =

Motor Carrier Act may refer to:

- Motor Carrier Act of 1935, an amendment to the Interstate Commerce Act that regulated bus lines and airlines as public utilities
- Motor Carrier Act of 1980, a law that deregulated the trucking industry
