= Dwight Henry (politician) =

American politician

Member of the Tennessee House of Representatives from the 42nd district
- In office January 10, 1989 – January 8, 1991
- Preceded by: Jerry Jared
- Succeeded by: Jere Hargrove

Mayor of Cookeville
- In office 1985–1988

Personal details
- Born: March 13, 1953 (age 73) Sweetwater, Tennessee, U.S.
- Party: Republican
- Education: Cleveland State Community College; Tennessee Technological University (BA)

Dwight Henry (born March 13, 1953) is an American politician and radio personality. A Republican, he served one term in the Tennessee House of Representatives (1989–1991), and was an unsuccessful candidate for Governor of Tennessee in 1990. He has also served as mayor of Cookeville, Tennessee (1985–1988), and has spent several years on the Cookeville City Council.

== Life and career ==
Henry was born in Sweetwater, Tennessee. He attended Cleveland State Community College from 1971 to 1973 and then enrolled in Tennessee Technological University, graduating in 1976 with a Bachelor of Arts degree. He became involved in the radio broadcasting industry and in 1985 was elected mayor of Cookeville, Tennessee.

Henry, was elected to the Tennessee House of Representatives in 1988 from the 42nd House District, a largely rural area centered on Cookeville, the site of Tennessee Tech, which had almost uniformly supported Democrats in the past.

When it became apparent that no prominent Republicans were going to challenge popular incumbent Tennessee governor Ned McWherter for re-election in 1990, Henry entered the fray, winning the primary election easily, apparently with the understanding that his chances of defeating McWherter in the general election were incredibly low, and that McWherter, a moderate who was also supported by many prominent Republicans, including many of their major contributors and fund raisers, would control the vast majority of all financial contributions made to the race. Henry's appeal was essentially solely to Republican straight-ticket voters and conservatives, and he received only about one-third of the votes in the November general election.

Henry was the youngest man ever elected to the office of mayor in Cookeville but is not the only record breaker in the Henry household. After taking office, his daughter, Brittany Kylene Henry became the first baby born to a mayor of Cookeville while he was still in office.

Henry ran for the State House again in 2000, but lost the general election to Jere Hargrove.

Tennessee House of Representatives
Preceded by Jerry A. Jared	Member of the Tennessee House of Representatives from the 42nd district 1989–1991	Succeeded by Jere Hargrove
Party political offices
Preceded by Winfield Dunn	Republican Party nominee for Governor of Tennessee; 1990	Succeeded by Don Sundquist
