= Harlan Mathews =

American politician

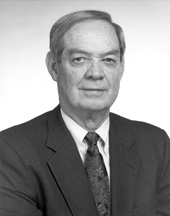

United States Senator from Tennessee
- In office January 2, 1993 – December 1, 1994
- Appointed by: Ned McWherter
- Preceded by: Al Gore
- Succeeded by: Fred Thompson

38th Tennessee State Treasurer
- In office March 31, 1974 – January 17, 1987
- Governor: Winfield Dunn; Ray Blanton; Lamar Alexander
- Preceded by: Thomas A. Wiseman, Jr.
- Succeeded by: Steve Adams

Personal details
- Born: January 17, 1927 Sumiton, Alabama, U.S.
- Died: May 9, 2014 (aged 87) Nashville, Tennessee, U.S.
- Resting place: Harpeth Hills Cemetery, Nashville, Tennessee
- Party: Democratic
- Spouse: Pat Jones
- Children: 3
- Education: Jacksonville State University (BA); Vanderbilt University (MPA)
- Profession: Lawyer

Military service
- Allegiance: United States
- Branch/service: United States Navy
- Years of service: 1944–1946

Harlan Mathews (January 17, 1927 – May 9, 2014) was an American politician who was an appointed United States Senator from Tennessee from 1993 to 1994. A Democrat, he previously served in the executive and legislative branches of state government in Tennessee for more than 40 years beginning in 1950.

== Early life and education ==
Harlan Mathews was born on January 17, 1927, in Sumiton, Alabama, to John William Mathews and Lillian (Young) Mathews. After completing high school in 1944, he enlisted in the United States Navy and served until 1946.

Following his military service, Mathews returned to Alabama and earned a Bachelor of Arts degree from Jacksonville State College (now Jacksonville State University) in 1949.

He subsequently earned a Master of Public Administration degree from Vanderbilt University in 1950. Mathews began his public service career on the planning staff of Governor Gordon Browning. In 1954, following the election of Governor Frank G. Clement, he joined the state’s budget staff.

In 1961, Mathews was appointed commissioner of finance and administration. While serving in that role, he completed a law degree in 1962 from the YMCA Night Law School, now known as the Nashville School of Law.

== Early political career ==
Mathews joined the staff of the governor of Tennessee in 1950, serving governors Gordon Browning, Frank G. Clement and Buford Ellington. From 1961 to 1971, he served as commissioner of finance and administration.

In January 1971, Mathews left the cabinet and entered the private sector for two years, working for Amcon International in Memphis. In 1973, he became the legislative assistant to longtime Tennessee Comptroller of the Treasury Bill Snodgrass. In 1974, Mathews was elected state treasurer by the Tennessee General Assembly after his predecessor, Tom Wiseman, resigned to run for governor. The Tennessee General Assembly elected Mathews to his first full two-year term as treasurer in 1975, where he served until January 1987, when he became deputy to Governor Ned R. McWherter.

== U.S. Senate ==
In 1993, Tennessee Governor Ned McWherter appointed Mathews to the U.S. Senate following the resignation of Al Gore, who resigned to serve as Vice President of the United States. Upon appointing Mathews to the senate, McWherter announced Mathews’ role would be one of caretaker, to allow those who wanted to run for the position to prepare their campaigns.

In mid-1993, Mathews expressed a desire to run in November 1994 for election to the remainder of Gore's senate term. "Hardly a day goes by that I don't get encouraged to get in there and offer myself" for next year's election, he said in July 1993. Mathews ultimately decided not to run in the special election and in December 1994, after Fred Thompson was elected to the seat, Mathews left office and resumed a law practice in Nashville, Tennessee.

== Death ==
Mathews died of brain cancer on May 9, 2014, at a hospice in Nashville. He was survived by his wife, Pat, and two sons. A third son, Richard Mathews, preceded him in death.

U.S. Senate
Preceded by Al Gore	U.S. senator (Class 2) from Tennessee; 1993–1994; Served alongside: Jim Sasser	Succeeded by Fred Thompson
