= Jere Hargrove =

American politician (born 1946)

Jere L. Hargrove

Member of the Tennessee House of Representatives from the 42nd district
- In office January 8, 1991 – January 9, 2007
- Preceded by: Dwight Henry
- Succeeded by: Henry Fincher

Personal details
- Born: September 17, 1946 (age 80) Cookeville, Tennessee, U.S.
- Party: Democratic

Jere Logan Hargrove (born September 17, 1946) is a Tennessee Democratic politician who served in the Tennessee House of Representatives.

== Early life and education ==
Hargrove was born September 17, 1946, in Cookeville, Tennessee. He was educated at Freed-Hardeman University, receiving an associate degree in 1966; Abilene Christian University, receiving a bachelor's degree in 1969; and the University of Tennessee College of Law, where he received a J.D. degree in 1981.

== Political career ==
Hargrove was an assistant district attorney in Putnam County, Tennessee, from 1987 to 1990.

In 1990, he was elected to the Tennessee House of Representatives, representing Putnam County, and took office the following year as a member of the 97th Tennessee General Assembly. He went on to serve eight consecutive two-year terms, from 1991 through 2006. He did not seek re-election in 2006.

He was Assistant House Majority Leader in the 98th and 99th General Assemblies and Majority Leader in the 100th and 101st General Assemblies. In the 104th Tennessee General Assembly (2005-2006), he was chairman of the House Commerce Committee.

== Personal life ==
Hargrove has four children and five grandchildren.
