= Tommy Burks =

American politician (1940–1998)

- Burks in 1983

Member of the Tennessee Senate
- In office January 9, 1979 – October 19, 1998
- Preceded by: Vernon Neal
- Succeeded by: Charlotte Burks
- Constituency: 13th district (1979–1983); 15th district (1983–1998)

Member of the Tennessee House of Representatives
- In office January 5, 1971 – January 9, 1979
- Preceded by: James L. Lacy
- Succeeded by: Jerry Jared
- Constituency: 17th district (1971–1973); 42nd district (1973–1979)

Personal details
- Born: Fred Thomas Burks; May 22, 1940 Cookeville, Tennessee, U.S.
- Died: October 19, 1998 (aged 58) Cookeville, Tennessee, U.S.
- Manner of death: Assassination by gunshot
- Party: Democratic
- Spouse: Charlotte Gentry
- Occupation: Farmer

Fred Thomas Burks (May 22, 1940 – October 19, 1998) was a farmer and Democratic Party politician in Tennessee, United States. He served in the Tennessee House of Representatives from 1970 until 1978 and in the Tennessee State Senate from 1978 until his assassination in 1998.

== Biography ==
Born in Cookeville, Tennessee, Burks was one of the most conservative Democrats in the state legislature. He was very conservative even by Tennessee Democratic standards of the time, opposing the teaching of evolution in school science classes (twice introducing legislation to restrict its teaching), legal abortion, gambling, and a state lottery. His views seemed to have been very popular and in line with a large number of voters within his rural district.

Burks was an energetic legislator who almost never missed a floor or committee session. He reportedly would on some occasions arrive at a session having already gotten up on his farm, delivered a load of hogs to Knoxville (about 90 miles east of his home), and then driven to the State Capitol in Nashville (100 miles west of his home and 190 miles west of Knoxville). Despite the 100-mile distance, and unlike most legislators from parts of the state a considerable distance from Nashville, Burks made it a practice to go home to his district and his farm almost every night, even during legislative sessions.

== Death ==
Burks ran for a sixth state senate term in 1998. On October 19, 1998, Burks was shot dead by his Republican Party opponent, Byron Looper, on Burks's own property just days before election. An eyewitness to the murder helped seal the conviction of Looper, who was, at the time, Putnam County tax assessor. Burks' widow, Charlotte, ran for his seat and won, becoming the first Tennessee state senator and one of very few American politicians to win as a write-in candidate. She was re-elected in 2002, 2006, and 2010. The gun used to kill Burks was found by a highway work crew near Highway 111 and Interstate 40, and is believed to have been thrown out of Looper's car window along I-40 between Monterey and Cookeville following the murder.

Interstate 40 through Wilson, Smith, Putnam, and Cumberland Counties is named the Tommy Burks Memorial Highway.

== See also ==
- List of assassinated American politicians
