= Third rail (politics) =

Metaphor for "untouchable" issues

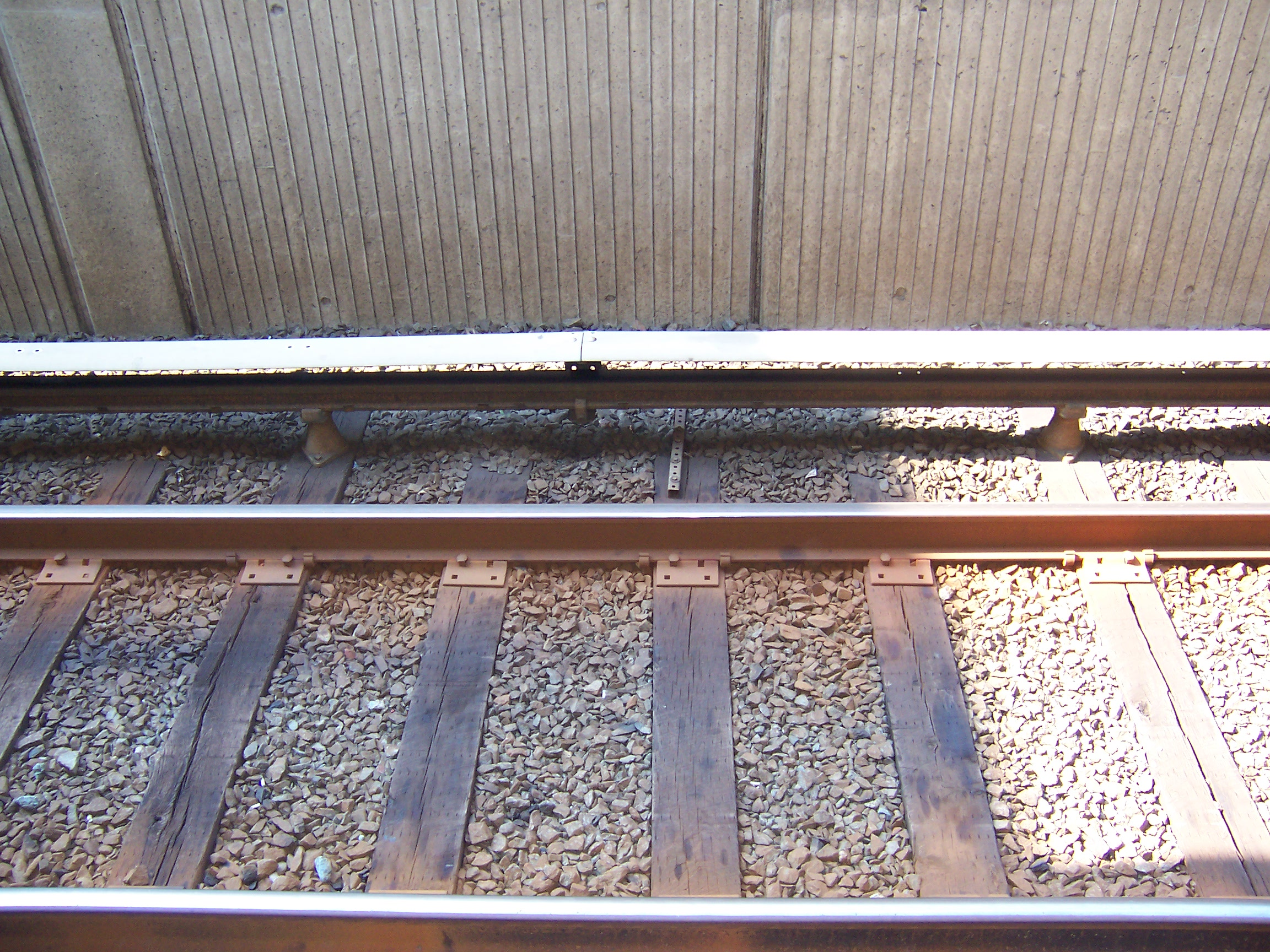
Third rails used to power trains usually result in the death by electrocution of anyone who comes into direct contact with them.

The third rail of a nation's politics is a metaphor for any issue so controversial that it is "charged" and "untouchable" to the extent that any politician or public official who dares to broach the subject will invariably suffer politically. The metaphor comes from the high-voltage third rail in some electric railway systems.

Touching a third rail can result in electrocution, so usage of the metaphor in political situations relates to the risk of "political suicide" that a person would face by raising certain taboo subjects or having points of view that are either censored, shunned or considered highly controversial or offensive to advocate or even mention.

It is most commonly used in North America. Though commonly attributed to Tip O'Neill, Speaker of the United States House of Representatives from 1977 to 1987, it seems to have been coined by O'Neill aide Kirk O'Donnell in 1982 in reference to Social Security.

== Examples by country ==
=== Argentina ===
- The Falkland Islands sovereignty dispute

=== Australia ===
- Policies to address climate change
- Introducing Constitutional recognition of Indigenous Australians, Aboriginal and Torres Strait Islander Voice, Makarrata Commission and Indigenous treaties
- Removing or reforming negative gearing

=== Canada ===
- Reforming or privatizing public health care
- Reforming or privatizing the Canada Pension Plan

=== China ===
- Advocating for Hong Kong independence

=== Germany ===
- Introducing a speed limit on Autobahns

=== India ===
- The introduction of income tax for agricultural income

=== Ireland ===
- Abortion was viewed as a third rail prior to the Thirty-sixth Amendment of the Constitution of Ireland which legalised it in 2018
- The provision of medical cards (which grant free or low-price healthcare to people on low incomes and the chronically ill)

=== New Zealand ===
- Reforming eligibility for superannuation.
- Repealing or reforming the country's nuclear-free policy.

=== United Kingdom ===
- Drug policy
- Reform of the National Health Service
- Social care
- West Lothian question
- Rejoining the European Union

=== United States ===
A wide range of issues might be claimed detrimental to politicians tackling them, but those below have all been explicitly described using the "third rail" metaphor:

- Withdrawal of Social Security and Medicare benefits
- Sex offender registry
- Debate of race issues
- Antidumping and countervailing duty withdrawal
- Opposition to abortion for rape victims
- Resuming the draft
- Debate about U.S. support for Israel
- Guns, including semi-automatic weapons and child safety locks.
- The transfer of federal lands over to states

== See also ==
- Asch conformity experiments – Series of psychology studies
- Communal reinforcement – Social phenomenon
- Foot-in-the-door technique – Compliance tactic
- Groupthink – Psychological phenomenon that occurs within a group of people
- Overton window – Range of ideas tolerated in public discourse
- Spiral of silence – Political science and mass communication theory
