= Tennessee Public Service Commission =

The Tennessee Public Service Commission, also called Tennessee Railroad and Public Utilities Commission, was a three-member elected body which regulated private utilities, trucking firms, and railroads within the U.S. state of Tennessee. It was dissolved in 1996 when its functions were transferred to the Tennessee Regulatory Authority.

The body consisted of three commissioners, one from each of the state's three "Grand Divisions" (East, Middle, and West Tennessee). While one member of the body was required to be from each Grand Division, each was elected on a statewide basis to staggered six-year terms, resulting in the election of one commissioner in each even-numbered year. This body was somewhat less powerful than some similar bodies in most other states in that, with the exception of the Kingsport area, it had no jurisdiction over electric rates since the vast majority of the state received its power from the Tennessee Valley Authority, which as part of the federal government was not subject to state regulation.

== History ==
The Tennessee Public Service Commission originated in 1897 as an elected three-member state Railroad Commission, vested with the authority to investigate the rates and practices of railroads and to approve rail tariffs. In 1919 the Railroad Commission's responsibilities were expanded to include the regulation of street railways and public utilities, and the Tennessee General Assembly changed the body's name to the Railroad and Public Utilities Commission. Jurisdiction over motor carriers was added in 1933. With the creation of the Tennessee Valley Authority in the 1930s the commission lost its jurisdiction over electric utilities; street railways were removed from commission jurisdiction in 1943. The commission's name was changed to the Public Service Commission in 1955.

Once the Tennessee Supreme Court was changed to being confirmed by a yes-no vote (the "Modified Missouri Plan" or "Tennessee Plan") rather than being chosen by an actual election, the PSC members became the only government officials in Tennessee other than the governor who were elected statewide. During the entire life of the body, all of its members were Democrats. The process was tainted by allegations of corruption. The general public showed very little interest in the office, despite its potential for considerable impact on their daily lives, with total votes cast in races for the office often amounting only to two-thirds or less of the numbers cast for governor, senator, or President in the same election, and most people largely or entirely unaware of the duties and functions of the commission. Nearly all campaign donations came from the industries which were regulated by the PSC, their representatives, and persons involved with them. No one was ever elected to higher office from the Tennessee Public Service Commission, although such attempts were occasionally made, such as in 1994 when Frank Cockran and Steve Hewlett ran unsuccessfully in the Democratic Gubernatorial Primary.

Election-related scandals and charges of favoritism, together with the fact that no Republican was ever elected to the office of Public Service Commissioner, led the administration of Governor Don Sundquist to move to abolish the office in 1995. The Tennessee General Assembly acted that year to abolish the Public Service Commission, replacing it with the Tennessee Regulatory Authority, consisting of three members, with one member each appointed by the Governor, the Lieutenant Governor, and the Speaker of the Tennessee House of Representatives. The Public Service Commission ceased operation on June 30, 1996, and the Regulatory Authority began operation the following day.

== See also ==
- Public utilities commission
