= List of Cumberland University people =

This is a list of notable current and former faculty members, administrators, alumni, and attendees of Cumberland University in Lebanon, Tennessee.

== Notable alumni ==
=== Academia ===
==== University presidents ====
- James S. Buchanan, 4th President of the University of Oklahoma, 1923-1925
- Ira Landrith, President of Belmont College (now University), 1904-1912
- Laban Lacy Rice, 14th President of Cumberland University, 1941–1946

==== Professors ====
- John William Burgess, Founder and dean of Columbia University's School of Political Science, 1880-1912
- J. P. Carnahan, Professor of mathematics at Cane Hill College
- George Abram Miller, Mathematics professor at Stanford University and the University of Illinois and early group theorist

=== Activists ===
- Dan Jack Combs, Advocate for the legalization of marijuana
- Cody Fowler, Civil rights activist, lawyer
- Myles Horton, Civil rights activist, educator
- Josephine Pearson, Anti-suffragist activist
- Byron Sigcho-Lopez, Community activist

=== Art, education, literature, and humanities ===
- John William Burgess, Professor of Law and Dean of the Graduate School of Political Science at Columbia University; author of influential works on political science
- Wendell Mayes, Playwright, screenwriter
- William O'Steele, Award-winning author
- Cale Young Rice, Playwright, poet
- Laban Lacy Rice, Writer

=== Athletics ===
- Dave Aaron, Head football coach at Austin Peay State College (now University), 1946–1954; Head basketball coach at Austin Peay State College (now University), 1946-1962
- George E. Allen, Head football coach of the 1916 Cumberland University team that lost 0–222 to Georgia Tech
- Marvin O. Bridges, Head football coach at the University of Florida at Lake City, a predecessor institution to the University of Florida
- A.J. Harmon, Professional football player for the Columbus Lions
- Rebecca Holloway, Professional soccer player
- Daniel Jackson, Professional soccer player
- Maylee Atthin-Johnson, Captain of the Trinidad and Tobago women's national soccer team, 2008
- Jack Farmer, Second baseman for the Pittsburgh Pirates, 1916, and the Cleveland Indians, 1918
- Luis Martinez, Catcher for the San Diego Padres, 2011, and Texas Rangers, 2012
- Ryan Sullivan, Professional cyclist
- Walt Wells, Head football coach at Eastern Kentucky University, 2020–present
- Craig Wight, Professional soccer player and manager
- Aaron Wilkerson, Pitcher for the Milwaukee Brewers, 2017-2019

=== Business and economics ===
- John Edgerton, President, National Association of Manufacturers, 1921-1931
- William H. Hardy, Founder of three Mississippi cities: Gulfport, Hattiesburg, and Laurel
- Francis Ikome, Founder and president, Cameroonian American Chamber of Commerce (CAMAM)
- Oscar Goodbar Johnston, President, Delta & Pine Land Company of Mississippi

=== Entertainment ===
- Chloe Kohanski, Singer-songwriter
- Wendell Mayes, Oscar-nominated screenwriter
- Jordan Taylor, Co-creator of Blimey Cow

=== Government and politics ===
==== U.S. Cabinet members ====
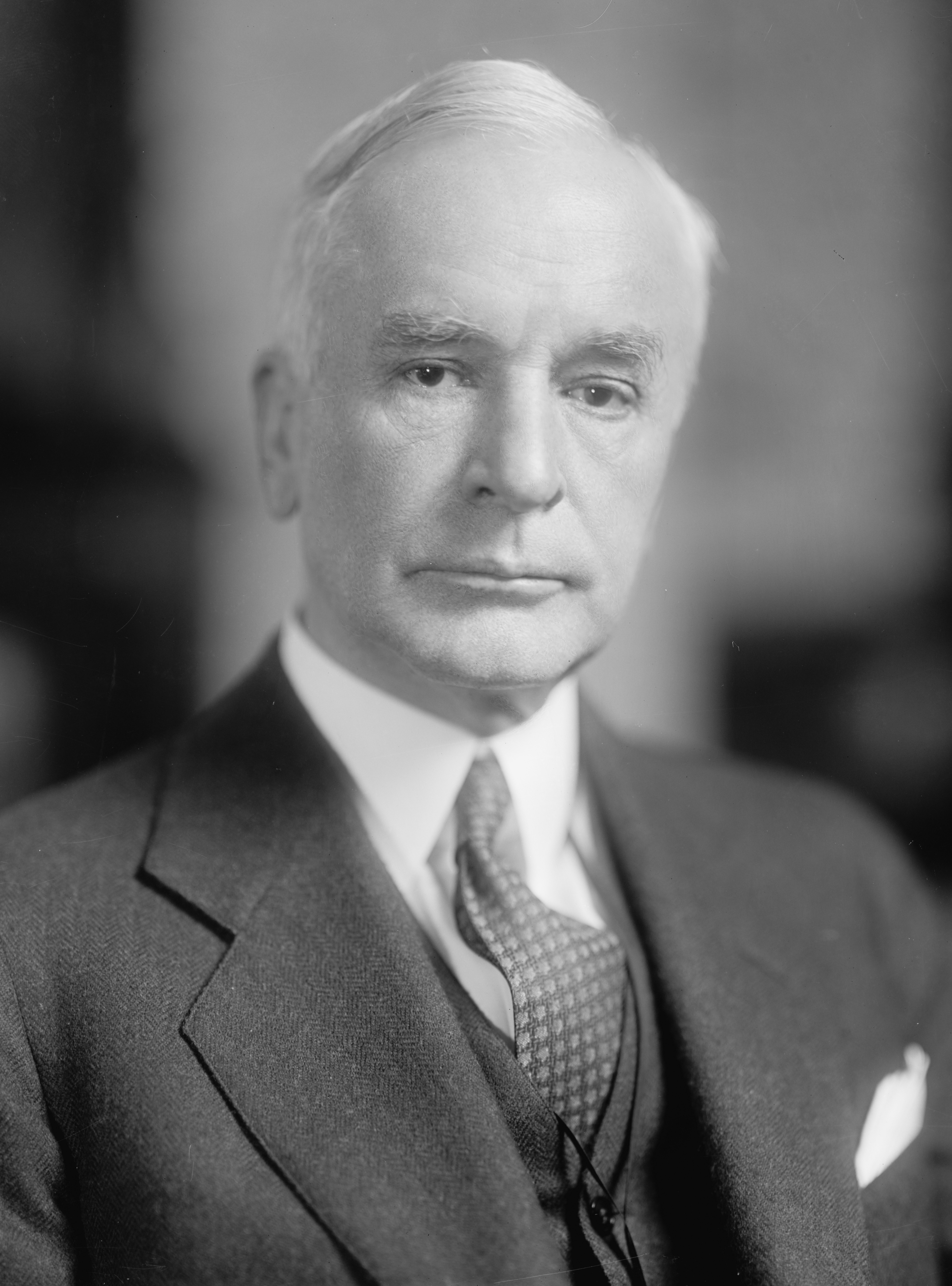
47th U.S. Secretary of State, Cordell Hull

- Cordell Hull, Secretary of State under President Franklin Delano Roosevelt, 1933–1944

==== U.S. diplomats ====
- Edward Albright, U. S. Envoy Extraordinary and Minister Plenipotentiary to Finland, 1933–1937; U.S. Envoy Extraordinary and Minister Plenipotentiary to Costa Rica, 1937
- Sam P. Gilstrap, Consul in Hong Kong and Macau, 1961; Ambassador Extraordinary and Plenipotentiary to Malawi, 1964-1965
- James D. Porter, United States Minister to Chile, 1893-1894
- James D. Tillman, U.S. Minister to Ecuador, 1895-1897

==== U.S. governors ====
- James V. Allred, 33rd governor of Texas, 1935-1939
- William B. Bate, 23rd governor of Tennessee, 1883-1887
- James T. Blair Jr., 44th governor of Missouri, 1957-1961
- Gordon Weaver Browning, 38th governor of Tennessee, 1937-1939 and 1949-1953
- Sidney Johnston Catts, 22nd governor of Florida, 1917-1921
- Frank G. Clement, 41st Governor of Tennessee, 1954–1959 and 1963–1967

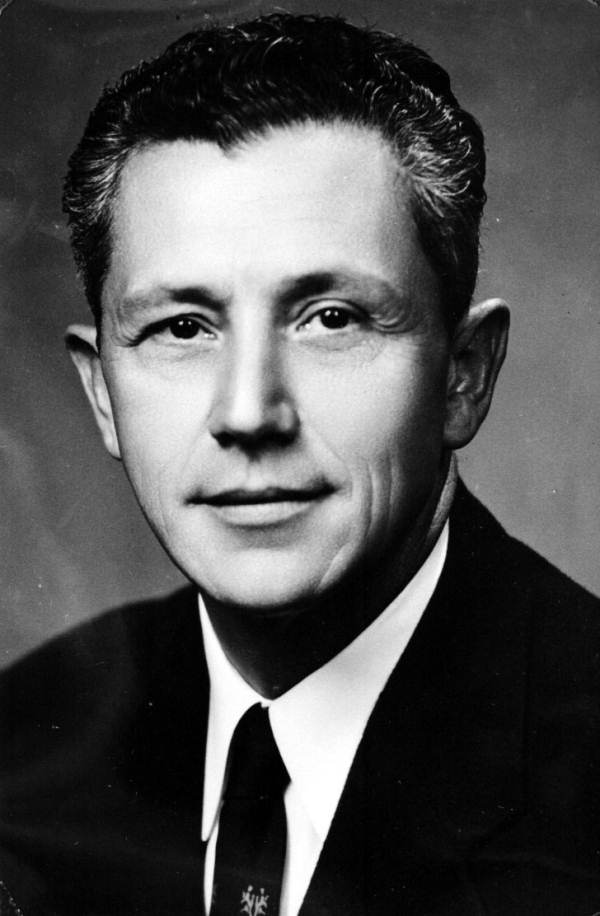
33rd Florida Governor LeRoy Collins

- LeRoy Collins, 33rd governor of Florida, 1955-1961
- Jeff Davis, 20th governor of Arkansas, 1901-1907
- Edward H. East, Acting governor of Tennessee, 1865
- Murphy J. Foster, 31st governor of Louisiana, 1892-1900
- John Isaac Guion, 13th governor of Mississippi, 1851
- William J. Holloway, 8th governor of Oklahoma, 1929-1931
- James B. McCreary, 27th and 37th governor of Kentucky, 1875-1879 and 1911-1915
- James D. Porter, 20th governor of Tennessee, 1875-1879
- Park Trammell, 21st governor of Florida, 1913-1917

==== U.S. lieutenant governors ====
- Hugh C. Anderson, Lieutenant Governor of Tennessee, 1915
- James T. Blair Jr., 35th lieutenant governor of Missouri, 1949-1957
- Sam Lumpkin, Lieutenant Governor of Mississippi, 1948-1952
- Milton H. Mabry, 8th lieutenant governor of Florida, 1885-1889

==== U.S. senators ====
- Joseph W. Bailey Sr., U.S. Senator from Texas, 1891-1913
- William B. Bate, U.S. Senator from Tennessee, 1887-1905
- Jeff Davis, U.S. Senator from Arkansas, 1907-1913
- Murphy J. Foster, U.S. Senator from Louisiana, 1901-1913
- Thomas P. Gore, U.S. Senator from Oklahoma, 1907–1921 and 1931–1937
- Carl Hatch, U.S. Senator from New Mexico, 1933-1949
- Cordell Hull, U.S. Senator from Tennessee, 1931-1933
- Howell Edmunds Jackson, U.S. Senator from Tennessee, 1881-1886
- William F. Kirby, U.S. Senator from Arkansas, 1916-1921
- Joshua B. Lee, U.S. Senator from Oklahoma, 1937-1943
- James B. McCreary, U.S. Senator from Kentucky, 1903-1909
- Bert H. Miller, U.S. Senator from Idaho, 1949
- Tom Stewart, U.S. Senator from Tennessee, 1938-1949
- Park Trammell, U.S. Senator from Florida, 1917-1936

==== U.S. representatives ====
- Thomas G. Abernethy, U.S. Representative from Mississippi, 1943–1973
- Joseph H. Acklen, U.S. Representative from Louisiana, 1878-1881
- Clifford Allen, U.S. Representative from Tennessee, 1975-1978
- John Mills Allen, U.S. Representative from Mississippi, 1885-1901
- Orland K. Armstrong, U.S. Representative from Missouri, 1951-1953
- Richard Merrill Atkinson, U.S. Representative from Tennessee, 1937-1939
- Risden Tyler Bennett, U.S. Representative from Tennessee, 1883-1887

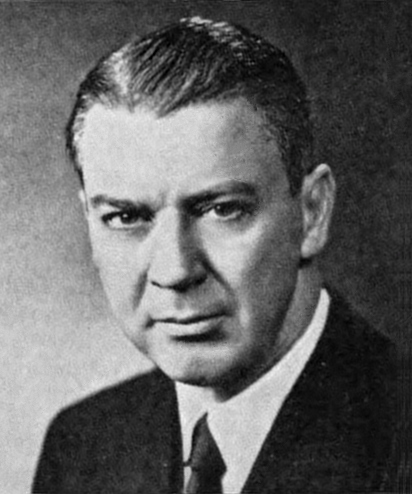
Former U.S. Rep. Joe Evins from Tennessee

- Maecenas Eason Benton, U.S. Representative from Missouri, 1897–1905; also father of famous painter, Thomas Hart Benton
- Eugene Black, U.S. Representative from Texas, 1915-1929
- Foster V. Brown, U.S. Representative from Tennessee, 1895-1897
- Joseph Edgar Brown, U.S. Representative from Tennessee, 1921-1923
- Gordon Weaver Browning, U.S. Representative from Tennessee, 1923-1935
- Omar Truman Burleson, U.S. Representative from Texas, 1947-1978
- Mounce Gore Butler, U.S. Representative from Tennessee, 1905-1907
- Robert R. Butler, U.S. Representative from Oregon, 1928-1933
- Adam M. Byrd, U.S. Representative from Mississippi, 1903-1911
- Robert Porter Caldwell, U.S. Representative from Tennessee, 1871-1873
- William Parker Caldwell, U.S. Representative from Tennessee, 1875-1879
- Samuel Caruthers, U.S. Representative from Missouri, 1853-1859
- Frank Chelf, U.S. Representative from Kentucky, 1945-1967
- Judson C. Clements, U.S. Representative from Georgia, 1881-1891
- Wynne F. Clouse, U.S. Representative from Tennessee, 1921-1923
- Jere Cooper, U.S. Representative from Tennessee, 1929-1957
- Nicholas N. Cox, U.S. Representative from Tennessee, 1891-1901
- William E. Cox, U.S. Representative from Indiana, 1907–1919.
- William Ruffin Cox, U.S. Representative from North Carolina, 1881-1887
- William Benjamin Craig, U.S. Representative from Alabama, 1907-1911
- Reese C. De Graffenreid, U.S. Representative from Texas, 1897-1902
- Dudley M. DuBose, U.S. Representative from Georgia, 1871-1873
- John Duncan Sr., U.S. Representative from Tennessee, 1965-1988
- Harold Earthman, U.S. Representative from Tennessee, 1945-1947
- Benjamin A. Enloe, U.S. Representative from Tennessee, 1887-1895
- Joe L. Evins, U.S. Representative from Tennessee, 1947-1977
- Lewis P. Featherstone, U.S. Representative from Arkansas, 1890-1891
- Antonio M. Fernández, U.S. Representative from New Mexico, 1943-1956
- Morgan Cassius Fitzpatrick, U.S. Representative from Tennessee, 1903-1905
- Aaron Ford, U.S. Representative from Mississippi, 1935–1943
- Lucien C. Gause, U.S. Representative from Arkansas, 1875-1879
- Brady P. Gentry, U.S. Representative from Texas, 1953–1957
- Edward Isaac Golladay, U.S. Representative from Tennessee, 1871-1873
- Isaac Herschel Goodnight, U.S. Representative from Kentucky, 1889-1895
- George Washington Gordon, U.S. Representative from Tennessee, 1907-1911
- Wharton J. Green, U.S. Representative from North Carolina, 1883-1887
- William Voris Gregory, U.S. Representative from Kentucky, 1927-1936
- John Edward Halsell, U.S. Representative from Kentucky, 1883-1887
- Oren Harris, U.S. Representative from Arkansas, 1953–1966; U.S. district judge
- Robert H. Hatton, U.S. Representative from Tennessee, 1859-1861
- Goldsmith W. Hewitt, U.S. Representative from Alabama, 1875–1879, 1881-1885
- Wilson S. Hill, U.S. Representative from Mississippi, 1903-1909
- John Ford House, U.S. Representative from Tennessee, 1875-1883
- George Huddleston, U.S. Representative from Alabama, 1915–1937
- Cordell Hull, U.S. Representative from Tennessee, 1907–1921, 1923-1931
- Luther Alexander Johnson, U.S. Representative from Texas, 1923-1946
- Abraham Kazen Jr., U.S. Representative from Texas, 1967-1985
- Wade H. Kitchens, J.D., U.S. Representative from Arkansas, 1937-1941
- John C. Kyle, U. S. Representative from Mississippi, 1891-1897
- William Bailey Lamar, U.S. Representative from Florida, 1903-1909
- Joshua B. Lee, U. S. Representative from Oklahoma, 1935-1937
- Joseph Carlton Loser, U.S. Representative from Tennessee, 1957-1963
- James B. McCreary, U.S. Representative from Kentucky, 1885-1897
- Samuel Davis McReynolds, U.S. Representative from Tennessee, 1923-1939
- John Ridley Mitchell, U.S. Representative from Tennessee, 1931-1939
- Morgan M. Moulder, U.S. Representative from Missouri, 1948–1962
- Henry Lowndes Muldrow, U. S. Representative from Mississippi, 1877-1885
- Tom J. Murray, U.S. Representative from Tennessee, 1943-1966
- David Alexander Nunn, U.S. Representative from Tennessee, 1867–1869, 1873-1875
- William Allan Oldfield, U.S. Representative from Arkansas, 1909-1928
- Wright Patman, U.S. Representative from Texas, 1929–1976
- Herron C. Pearson, U.S. Representative from Tennessee, 1935-1943
- Andrew Price, U.S. Representative from Louisiana, 1889-1897
- B. Carroll Reece, U.S. Representative from Tennessee, 1921–1931, 1933–1947, 1951-1961
- Haywood Yancey Riddle, U.S. Representative from Tennessee, 1875-1879
- James Edward Ruffin, U.S. Representative from Missouri, 1933-1935
- William Charles Salmon, U.S. Representative from Tennessee, 1923-1925
- Lon A. Scott, U.S. Representative from Tennessee, 1921-1923
- Thetus W. Sims, U.S. Representative from Tennessee, 1897-1921
- Thomas U. Sisson, U.S. Representative from Mississippi, 1909-1923
- William Ferguson Slemons, U.S. Representative from Arkansas, 1875-1881
- John H. Smithwick, U.S. Representative from Florida, 1919-1927
- Henry C. Snodgrass, U.S. Representative from Tennessee, 1891-1895
- John Hall Stephens, U.S. Representative from Texas, 1897-1917
- James Patrick Sutton, U.S. Representative from Tennessee, 1949-1955
- Fletcher B. Swank, U.S. Representative from Oklahoma, 1921-1929
- Charles Swindall, U.S. Representative from Oklahoma, 1920-1921
- Anthony F. Tauriello, U.S. Representative from New York, 1949-1951
- John May Taylor, U.S. Representative from Tennessee, 1883-1887
- J. Will Taylor, U.S. Representative from Tennessee, 1919-1939
- Zachary Taylor, U.S. Representative from Tennessee, 1885-1887
- William Wirt Vaughan, U.S. Representative from Tennessee, 1871-1873
- William W. Venable, U.S. Representative from Mississippi, 1916-1921
- Richard Warner, U.S. Representative from Tennessee, 1881-1885
- John T. Watkins, U.S. Representative from Louisiana, 1905–1921
- Charles K. Wheeler, U.S. Representative from Kentucky, 1897-1903
- Daniel B. Wright, U.S. Representative from Mississippi, 1853-1857

==== U.S. territorial delegates ====
- John Wilkins Whitfield, Territorial delegate to the U.S. Congress representing the Kansas Territory, 1854-1856

==== U.S. judicial officials ====
===== U.S. Supreme Court justices =====
- Howell Edmunds Jackson, Associate Justice of the U.S. Supreme Court, 1893–1895
- Horace Harmon Lurton, Associate Justice of the U.S. Supreme Court, 1910–1914

===== Other federal judges =====
- Benjamin Franklin Cameron, Judge of the U.S. Court of Appeals for the Fifth Circuit, 1955-1964
- Sidney Lee Christie, Judge of the U.S. District Court for the Southern District of West Virginia and the U.S. District Court for the Northern District of West Virginia, 1964-1974
- Harry E. Claiborne, Chief Judge of the U.S. District Court for the District of Nevada, 1980-1986
- Charles Dickens Clark, Judge of the U. S. District Court for the Eastern District of Tennessee and the U. S. District Court for the Middle District of Tennessee, 1895-1908
- Leslie Rogers Darr, Judge of the U. S. District Court for the Middle District of Tennessee, 1939–1940; Judge of the U. S. District Court for the Eastern District of Tennessee, 1939-1967
- Frederick Alvin Daugherty, Judge of the U.S. District Court for the Eastern District of Oklahoma, the U.S. District Court for the Northern District of Oklahoma, and the U.S. District Court for the Western District of Oklahoma, 1961-2006
- Frank Gray Jr., Judge of the U.S. District Court for the Middle District of Tennessee, 1961-1978
- William Voris Gregory, U.S. Attorney for the Western District of Kentucky, 1919-1923
- Eli Shelby Hammond, Judge of the U.S. District Court for the Western District of Tennessee, 1878-1904
- Carl Hatch, Judge of the U.S. District Court for the District of New Mexico, 1949-1963
- Xenophon Hicks, Judge of the U. S. District Court for the Middle District of Tennessee, 1923–1928; Judge of the U. S. District Court for the Eastern District of Tennessee, 1923–1928; Circuit Judge of the U. S. Court of Appeals for the Sixth Circuit, 1928-1952
- Tillman D. Johnson, Judge of the U. S. District Court for the District of Utah, 1915-1953
- Charles Gelbert Neese, Judge of the U.S. District Court for the Eastern District of Tennessee, 1961-1989
- Harry Phillips, Circuit Judge of the U.S. Court of Appeals for the Sixth Circuit, 1963-1985
- John William Ross, Judge of the U. S. District Court for the Western District of Tennessee, 1921-1925
- Roy Mahlon Shelbourne, Judge of the U.S. District Court for the Western District of Kentucky, 1946-1974
- David Davie Shelby, Judge of the U.S. Circuit Courts for the Fifth Circuit, 1899–1911; Circuit Judge of the United States Court of Appeals for the Fifth Circuit, 1899-1914
- John A. Tyson, Justice of the United States Tax Court, 1935-1950

===== State judges =====
- Theodore M. Brantley, Chief Justice of the Supreme Court of Montana, 1899–1922
- Burrill B. Battle, Justice of the Supreme Court of Arkansas, 1885-1910
- Chester C. Chattin, Justice of the Supreme Court of Tennessee, 1965-1974
- James Waddey Clark, Justice of the Supreme Court of Oklahoma, 1925-1933
- Dan Jack Combs, Justice of the Supreme Court of Kentucky, 1989-1993
- Ross W. Dyer, Justice of the Supreme Court of Tennessee, 1961-1974 (Chief Justice, 1969–1974)
- Reuben R. Gaines, Justice of the Supreme Court of Texas, 1886-1911 (Chief Justice, 1894–1911)
- Charles Galbreath, Justice of the Tennessee Court of Appeals, 1968-1978
- Grafton Green, Justice of the Supreme Court of Tennessee, 1910-1947 (Chief Justice, 1923–1947)
- Carleton Harris, Justice of the Supreme Court of Arkansas, 1957-1980
- Fred L. Henley, Justice of the Supreme Court of Missouri, 1964-1978
- Joseph Morrison Hill, Chief Justice of the Supreme Court of Arkansas, 1904-1909
- James Edwin Horton, Jr., Circuit Judge of the Eighth Circuit Court in Alabama. Presided over the retrial of Haywood Patterson, one of the Scottsboro Boys
- Allison B. Humphreys, Justice of the Supreme Court of Tennessee, 1967-1974
- Napoleon B. Johnson, Justice of the Supreme Court of Oklahoma, 1948-1965
- Roy Noble Lee, Chief Justice of the Supreme Court of Mississippi, 1987-1993
- Benjamin Horsley Littleton, Judge of the United States Court of Claims, 1929-1966
- Robert Martin Lusk, Justice of the Superior Court of Texas, 1888-1889
- Milton H. Mabry, Justice of the Supreme Court of Florida, 1891-1903
- A.B. Neil, Justice of the Supreme Court of Tennessee, 1942-1960
- Horace Elmo Nichols, Chief Justice of the Supreme Court of Georgia, 1975-1980
- Charles H. O'Brien, Justice of the Supreme Court of Tennessee, 1987-1994
- William Y. Pemberton, Chief Justice of the Supreme Court of Montana, 1893-1899
- Paine Page Prim, 6th Chief Justice of the Supreme Court of Oregon, 1864–1866, 1870–1872, 1876-1878
- Robert M. Rainey, Justice of the Supreme Court of Oklahoma, 1917-1921
- Henry A. Sharpe, Justice of the Supreme Court of Alabama, 1898-1904
- Griffin Smith Sr., Chief Justice of the Supreme Court of Arkansas, 1937-1955
- Henderson M. Somerville, Member of the Board of General Appraisers, 1890-1915 (President, 1910–1914)
- Charles Swindall, Justice of the Supreme Court of Oklahoma, 1929-1934
- William Glenn Terrell, Justice of the Supreme Court of Florida, 1923-1964
- Collin S. Tarpley, Justice of the Supreme Court of Mississippi, 1851
- Weldon B. White, Justice of the Supreme Court of Tennessee, 1961-1967
- Samuel Franklin Wilson, Justice of the Tennessee Court of Chancery Appeals, 1895-1901

==== State legislators ====
- A.M. Aikin Jr., Member of the Texas Legislature, 1933-1979
- Tommy Burnett, Majority Leader of the Tennessee House of Representatives
- Scotty Campbell, Member of the Tennessee House of Representatives, 2010–2012, 2020–present
- Stuart B. Carter, Member of the Virginia General Assembly, 1950-1960
- Glenn Freeman, Member of the Kentucky General Assembly, 1970–1971, 1974–1977, 1996-2000
- Absolom Gant Jr., Member of the Texas Texas House of Representatives, 1871-1873
- Tommy Head, Member of the Tennessee House of Representatives, 1986–2004; brother of coach Pat Summitt
- J. F. Henley, Member of the Arkansas House of Representatives, 1891–1895, 1901-1903
- Edmund B. Jenks, Member of the New York State Assembly, 1917-1932
- James Sloan Kuykendall, Member of the West Virginia House of Delegates, 1907–1908, 1919-1920
- John Marks Moore, member of the Texas House of Representatives, 1883–85, Secretary of State of Texas, 1887–1891
- A. K. Montgomery, Member of the New Mexico Senate, 1937-1941
- Mark Pody, Member of the Tennessee General Assembly, 2011–present
- E. Ray Reed, Member of the West Virginia Legislature, 1932–1936, 1940–1944, 1950-1954
- Edgar Bright Wilson, Speaker of the Tennessee House of Representatives, 1901-1903

==== Mayors ====
- Hugh C. Anderson, Mayor of Jackson, Tennessee, 1884-1900
- Beverly Briley, 1st Mayor of Metropolitan Nashville, 1963-1975
- John Jay Good, 18th Mayor of Dallas, Texas, 1880-1881
- George Blackmore Guild, Mayor of Nashville, Tennessee, 1891-1895
- Henry D. Lindsley, 32nd Mayor of Dallas, Texas 1915-1917
- Milton H. Mabry, Mayor of Tupelo, Mississippi
- George B. Ward, 16th Mayor of Birmingham, Alabama, 1905-1908
- Ben West, Mayor of Nashville, Tennessee, 1951–1963

==== Other ====
- George E. Allen, Advisor to President Harry Truman
- Ambrose B. Broadbent, Speaker of the Tennessee Senate, 1931–33; Tennessee Secretary of State, 1937–1941
- J. P. Carnahan, Populist Party gubernatorial candidate in Arkansas, 1892
- Judson C. Clements, Member of the Interstate Commerce Commission, 1892–1917 (chairman, 1910–12)
- Read Fletcher, U.S. Attorney for the Eastern District of Arkansas, 1856–57
- Stephen F. Hale, Deputy to the Provisional Congress of the Confederate States from Alabama, 1861–62
- Sam Houston Johnson, Aide to his older brother, U.S. president Lyndon B. Johnson
- Ira Landrith, Vice-presidential nominee for the Prohibition Party, 1916
- Crawford Martin, 44th Attorney General of Texas, 1967–1972
- Richard M. Milburn, 21st Attorney General of Indiana, January 1915 — November 1915
- Joseph Turner Patterson, 34th Attorney General of Mississippi, 1956–1969
- James D. Porter, U.S. Assistant Secretary of State, 1885–87

=== Journalism ===
- Nat Caldwell, Pulitzer Prize-winning journalist at the Nashville Tennessean, 1934-1985
- Daniel M. Grissom, St. Louis, Missouri, journalist
- Abb Landis, Owner of the Nashville Banner, 1884-1885

=== Military ===
- Alexander William Campbell, Confederate States general
- John C. Carter, Confederate States general
- William Ruffin Cox, Confederate States general
- Dudley M. DuBose, Confederate States general
- George Washington Gordon, Confederate States general
- Robert H. Hatton, Confederate States general
- Vernon E. James, US Army major general
- George Doherty Johnston, Confederate States general; superintendent of The Citadel (military college)
- David R. Ray, Medal of Honor recipient, Vietnam War
- Cadmus M. Wilcox, Confederate States general

=== Other ===
- Rosa Gerhardt, President of the Mobile Bar Association, 1948
- Napoleon B. Johnson, 1st President of the National Congress of American Indians, 1944-1952
- Graynella Packer, the first female radiotelegraph (wireless) operator to make overnight voyages on an ocean-going vessel
