= 1915 in the United States =

- Decades: 1890s; 1900s; 1910s; 1920s; 1930s
- See also: History of the United States (1865–1918); Timeline of United States history (1900–1929); List of years in the United States

Events from the year 1915 in the United States.

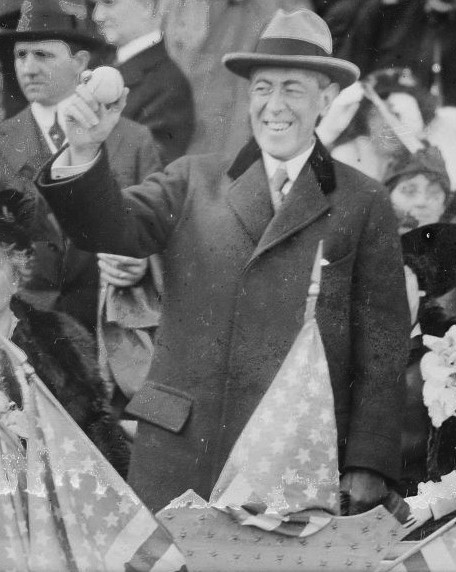
President Woodrow Wilson throws out the first pitch at the 1915 World Series.

== Incumbents ==
=== Federal government ===
- President: Woodrow Wilson (D-New Jersey)
- Vice President: Thomas R. Marshall (D-Indiana)
- Chief Justice: Edward Douglass White (Louisiana)
- Speaker of the House of Representatives: Champ Clark (D-Missouri)
- Congress: 63rd (until March 4), 64th (starting March 4)

==== State governments ====
Governors and lieutenant governors

=== Governors ===
- Governor of Alabama: Emmet O'Neal (Democratic) (until January 18), Charles Henderson (Democratic) (starting January 18)
- Governor of Arizona: George W. P. Hunt (Democratic)
- Governor of Arkansas: George Washington Hays (Democratic)
- Governor of California: Hiram Johnson (Republican)
- Governor of Colorado: Elias M. Ammons (Democratic) (until January 12), George Alfred Carlson (Republican) (starting January 12)
- Governor of Connecticut: Simeon E. Baldwin (Democratic) (until January 6), Marcus H. Holcomb (Republican) (starting January 6)
- Governor of Delaware: Charles R. Miller (Republican)
- Governor of Florida: Park Trammell (Democratic)
- Governor of Georgia: John M. Slaton (Democratic) (until June 26), Nathaniel E. Harris (Democratic) (starting June 26)
- Governor of Idaho: John M. Haines (Republican) (until January 4), Moses Alexander (Democratic) (starting January 4)
- Governor of Illinois: Edward F. Dunne (Democratic)
- Governor of Indiana: Samuel M. Ralston (Democratic)
- Governor of Iowa: George W. Clarke (Republican)
- Governor of Kansas: George H. Hodges (Democratic) (until January 11), Arthur Capper (Republican) (starting January 11)
- Governor of Kentucky: James B. McCreary (Democratic) (until December 7), Augustus O. Stanley (Democratic) (starting December 7)
- Governor of Louisiana: Luther Egbert Hall (Democratic)
- Governor of Maine: William T. Haines (Republican) (until January 6), Oakley C. Curtis (Democratic) (starting January 6)
- Governor of Maryland: Phillips Lee Goldsborough (Republican)
- Governor of Massachusetts: David I. Walsh (Democratic)
- Governor of Michigan: Woodbridge N. Ferris (Democratic)
- Governor of Minnesota:
  - until January 5: Adolph O. Eberhart (Republican)
  - January 5-December 30: Winfield S. Hammond (Democratic)
  - starting December 30: J. A. A. Burnquist (Republican)
- Governor of Mississippi: Earl L. Brewer (Democratic)
- Governor of Missouri: Elliot Woolfolk Major (Democratic)
- Governor of Montana: Sam V. Stewart (Democratic)
- Governor of Nebraska: John H. Morehead (Democratic)
- Governor of Nevada: Tasker L. Oddie (Republican) (until January 4), Emmet D. Boyle (Democratic) (starting January 4)
- Governor of New Hampshire: Samuel D. Felker (Democratic) (until January 1), Rolland H. Spaulding (Republican) (starting January 1)
- Governor of New Jersey: James Fairman Fielder (Democratic)
- Governor of New Mexico: William C. McDonald (Democratic)
- Governor of New York: Charles S. Whitman (Republican) (starting January 1)
- Governor of North Carolina: Locke Craig (Democratic)
- Governor of North Dakota: L. B. Hanna (Republican)
- Governor of Ohio: James M. Cox (Democratic) (until January 11), Frank B. Willis (Democratic) (starting January 11)
- Governor of Oklahoma: Lee Cruce (Democratic) (until January 11), Robert L. Williams (Democratic) (starting January 11)
- Governor of Oregon: Oswald West (Democratic) (until January 12), James Withycombe (Republican) (starting January 12)
- Governor of Pennsylvania: John K. Tener (Republican) (until January 19), Martin Grove Brumbaugh (Republican) (starting January 19)
- Governor of Rhode Island: Aram J. Pothier (Republican) (until January 5), R. Livingston Beeckman (Republican) (starting January 5)
- Governor of South Carolina:
  - until January 14: Coleman Livingston Blease (Democratic)
  - January 14–19: Charles Aurelius Smith (Democratic)
  - starting January 19: Richard Irvine Manning III (Democratic)
- Governor of South Dakota: Frank M. Byrne (Republican)
- Governor of Tennessee: Ben W. Hooper (Republican) (until January 17), Tom C. Rye (Democratic) (starting January 17)
- Governor of Texas: Oscar Branch Colquitt (Democratic) (until January 19), James E. Ferguson (Democratic) (starting January 19)
- Governor of Utah: William Spry (Republican)
- Governor of Vermont: Allen M. Fletcher (Republican) (until January 7), Charles W. Gates (Republican) (starting January 7)
- Governor of Virginia: Henry Carter Stuart (Democratic)
- Governor of Washington: Ernest Lister (Democratic)
- Governor of West Virginia: Henry D. Hatfield (Republican)
- Governor of Wisconsin: Francis E. McGovern (Republican) (until January 4), Emanuel L. Philipp (Republican) (starting January 4)
- Governor of Wyoming: Joseph M. Carey (Democratic) (until January 4), John B. Kendrick (Democratic) (starting January 4)

=== Lieutenant governors ===
- Lieutenant Governor of Alabama: Walter D. Seed, Sr. (Democratic) (until January 18), Thomas E. Kilby (Democratic) (starting January 18)
- Lieutenant Governor of California: A. J. Wallace (Republican) (until January 5), John Morton Eshleman (Progressive) (starting January 5)
- Lieutenant Governor of Colorado: Stephen R. Fitzgarrald (Democratic) (until January 12), Moses E. Lewis (Republican) (starting January 12)
- Lieutenant Governor of Connecticut: Lyman T. Tingier (Democratic) (until January 6), Clifford B. Wilson (Republican) (starting January 6)
- Lieutenant Governor of Delaware: Colen Ferguson (Democratic)
- Lieutenant Governor of Idaho: Herman H. Taylor (Republican)
- Lieutenant Governor of Illinois: Barratt O'Hara (Democratic)
- Lieutenant Governor of Indiana: William P. O'Neill (Democratic)
- Lieutenant Governor of Iowa: William L. Harding (Republican)
- Lieutenant Governor of Kansas: Sheffield Ingalls (Republican) (until January 11), William Yoast Morgan (Republican) (starting January 11)
- Lieutenant Governor of Kentucky: Edward J. McDermott (Democratic) (until December 7), James D. Black (Democratic) (starting December 7)
- Lieutenant Governor of Louisiana: Thomas C. Barret (Democratic)
- Lieutenant Governor of Massachusetts: Edward P. Barry (Democratic) (until month and day unknown), Grafton D. Cushing (Republican) (starting month and day unknown)
- Lieutenant Governor of Michigan: John Q. Ross (Republican) (until month and day unknown), Luren D. Dickinson (Republican) (starting month and day unknown)
- Lieutenant Governor of Minnesota: Joseph A. A. Burnquist (Republican) (until December 30), vacant (starting December 30)
- Lieutenant Governor of Mississippi: Theodore G. Bilbo (Democratic)
- Lieutenant Governor of Missouri: William Rock Painter (Democratic)
- Lieutenant Governor of Montana: W. W. McDowell (Democratic)
- Lieutenant Governor of Nebraska: Samuel R. McKelvie (Republican) (until January 1), James Pearson (Democratic) (starting January 1)
- Lieutenant Governor of Nevada: Gilbert C. Ross (political party unknown) (until January 4), Maurice J. Sullivan (Democratic) (starting January 4)
- Lieutenant Governor of New Mexico: Ezequiel Cabeza De Baca (Democratic)
- Lieutenant Governor of New York: Edward Schoeneck (Republican) (starting January 1)
- Lieutenant Governor of North Carolina: Elijah L. Daughtridge (Democratic)
- Lieutenant Governor of North Dakota: Anton T. Kraabel (Republican) (until month and day unknown), John H. Fraine (Republican) (starting month and day unknown)
- Lieutenant Governor of Ohio: W. A. Greenlund (Democratic) (until January 11), John H. Arnold (Republican) (starting January 11)
- Lieutenant Governor of Oklahoma: J. J. McAlester (Democratic) (until January 11), Martin E. Trapp (Democratic) (starting January 11)
- Lieutenant Governor of Pennsylvania: John M. Reynolds (Republican) (until January 19), Frank B. McClain (Republican) (starting January 19)
- Lieutenant Governor of Rhode Island: Roswell B. Burchard (Republican) (until January 5), Emery J. San Souci (Republican) (starting January 5)
- Lieutenant Governor of South Carolina:
  - until January 14: Charles Aurelius Smith (Democratic)
  - January 14–19: vacant
  - starting January 19: Andrew Bethea (Democratic)
- Lieutenant Governor of South Dakota: Edward Lincoln Abel (Republican) (until month and day unknown), Peter Norbeck (Republican) (starting month and day unknown)
- Lieutenant Governor of Tennessee:
  - until month and day unknown: Newton H. White (Democratic)
  - month and day unknown: Hugh C. Anderson (Democratic)
  - starting month and day unknown: Albert E. Hill (Democratic)
- Lieutenant Governor of Texas: vacant (until January 19), William P. Hobby (Democratic) (starting January 19)
- Lieutenant Governor of Vermont: Frank E. Howe (Republican) (until January 19), Hale K. Darling (Republican) (starting January 19)
- Lieutenant Governor of Virginia: James Taylor Ellyson (Democratic)
- Lieutenant Governor of Washington: Louis Folwell Hart (Republican)
- Lieutenant Governor of Wisconsin: Thomas Morris (Republican) (until January 4), Edward F. Dithmar (Republican) (starting January 4)

== Events ==
=== January–March ===
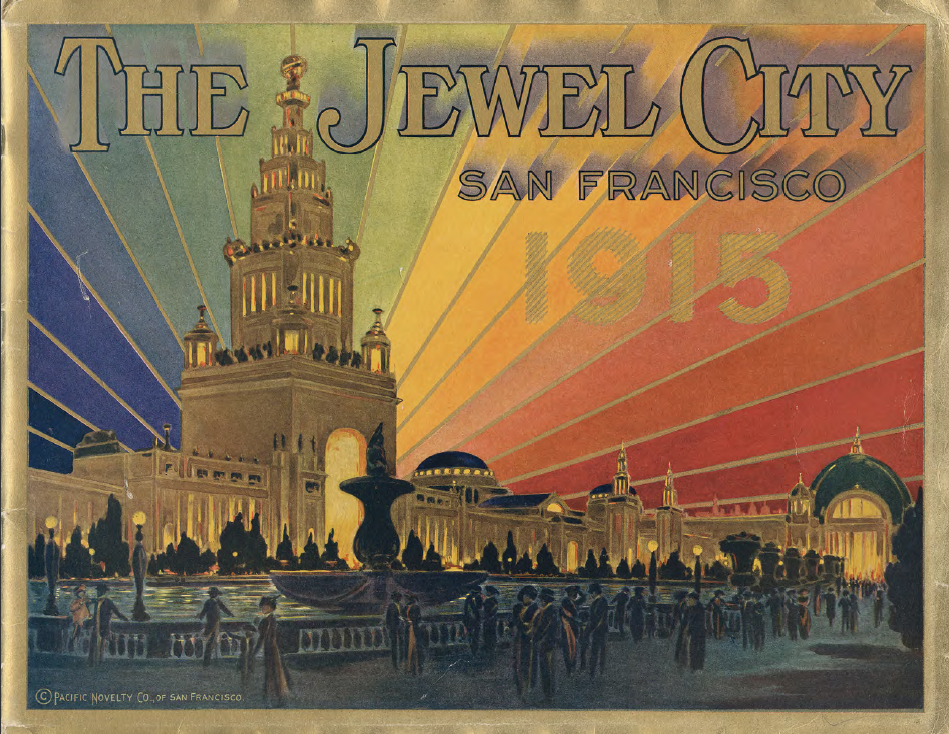
Souvenir booklet for the Panama–Pacific International Exposition

- January – While working as a cook at New York's Sloan Hospital under an assumed name, "Typhoid Mary" infects 25 people, and is placed in quarantine for life.
- January 12 – The United States House of Representatives rejects a proposal to give women the right to vote.
- January 18 – Charles Henderson is sworn in as the 35th governor of Alabama replacing Emmet O'Neal.
- January 21 – Kiwanis International is founded in Detroit, Michigan.
- January 26 – Rocky Mountain National Park in Colorado is established.
- January 28 – An act of the U.S. Congress designates the United States Coast Guard, begun in 1790, as a military branch over 19 years.
- February 1 – Fox Film is founded.
- February 2 – Vanceboro international bridge bombing
- February 8 – The controversial film, The Birth of a Nation, directed by D. W. Griffith, premieres in Los Angeles.
- February 12 – In Washington, D.C. the first stone of the Lincoln Memorial is put into place.
- February 20 – In San Francisco, California the Panama–Pacific International Exposition is opened.
- March 3 – NACA, the predecessor of NASA, is founded.
- March 25 – The USS F-4 submarine sinks off Hawaii; 23 are killed.
- March 28 – The first Roman Catholic Liturgy is celebrated by Archbishop John Ireland at the newly consecrated Cathedral of Saint Paul in Saint Paul, Minnesota.

=== April–June ===
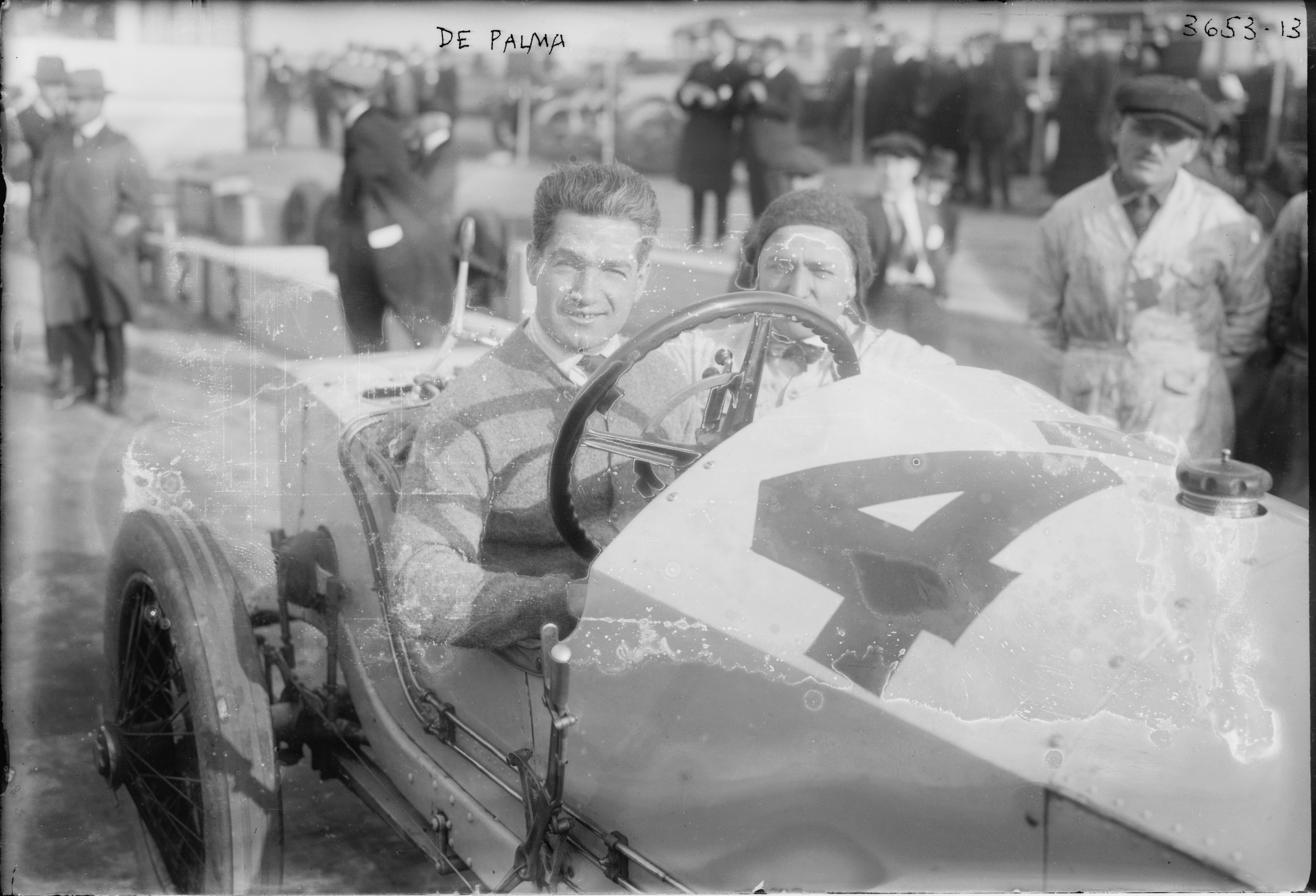
Ralph DePalma (1882–1956) wins the 1915 Indianapolis 500 on May 31.

- May 6 – Babe Ruth hits his first career home run off of Jack Warhop.
- May 7 – The RMS Lusitania is sunk on passage from New York to Britain by a German U-boat, killing 1,198.
- May 22 – Lassen Peak, one of the Cascade Volcanoes in Northern California, erupts, sending an ash plume 30,000 feet in the air and devastating the nearby area with pyroclastic flows and lahars. It is the only volcano to erupt in the contiguous United States between 1900 and the 1980 eruption of Mount St. Helens.
- June 9 – U.S. Secretary of State William Jennings Bryan resigns over a disagreement regarding his nation's handling of the Lusitania sinking.
- June 12 – "The class the stars fell on" graduates from the United States Military Academy at West Point, New York.
- June 21 – Guinn v. United States is decided by the Supreme Court of the United States, finding grandfather clause exemptions to literacy tests for voters to be unconstitutional.
- June 22 – The Imperial Valley earthquakes shook southeastern Southern California, causing six deaths and financial losses of $900,000. Each shock in this doublet earthquake measured 5.5 M_{w} and had a maximum Mercalli intensity of VIII (Severe).

=== July–September ===
- July 24 – The steamer Eastland capsizes in central Chicago, with the loss of 844 lives.
- July 28 – The United States occupation of Haiti begins.
- August 5–23 – Hurricane Two of the 1915 Atlantic hurricane season over Galveston and New Orleans leaves 275 dead.
- August 17 – Jewish American Leo Frank is lynched for the murder of a 13-year-old girl in Atlanta.
- August 31 – Jimmy Lavender of the Chicago Cubs pitches a no hitter against the New York Giants.
- September 11 – The Pennsylvania Railroad begins electrified commuter rail service between Paoli and Philadelphia, using overhead AC trolley wires for power. This type of system is later used in long-distance passenger trains between New York City, Washington, D.C., and Harrisburg, Pennsylvania.

=== October–December ===
- October 2 – The 6.8 M_{w} Pleasant Valley earthquake shook north-central Nevada with a maximum Mercalli intensity of X (Extreme), causing limited damage and pronounced fault scarps along the base of the Tobin Range.
- October 4 – Dinosaur National Monument is established.
- October 19 – Mexican Revolution: The U.S. recognizes the Mexican government of Venustiano Carranza de facto (not de jure until 1917).
- October 21 – The United Daughters of the Confederacy holds its first annual meeting outside the South, in San Francisco. Historian General Mildred Rutherford addresses the gathering on the "Historical Sins of Omission & Commission", of Yankee historians.
- October 25 – Lyda Conley, the first American Indian woman to appear before the Supreme Court of the United States as a lawyer, is admitted to practice there.
- November 18 – Release of Inspiration, the first mainstream movie in which a leading actress (Audrey Munson) appears nude.
- November 23 – The Triangle Film Corporation opens its new motion picture theater in Massillon, Ohio.
- November 27 (Thanksgiving Night) – Second Ku Klux Klan established in Stone Mountain, Georgia by William Joseph Simmons.
- December 10 – The 1 millionth Ford car rolls off the assembly line at the River Rouge Plant in Detroit, Michigan.
- December 18 – United States president Woodrow Wilson marries Edith B. Galt, in Washington, D.C.

=== Undated ===
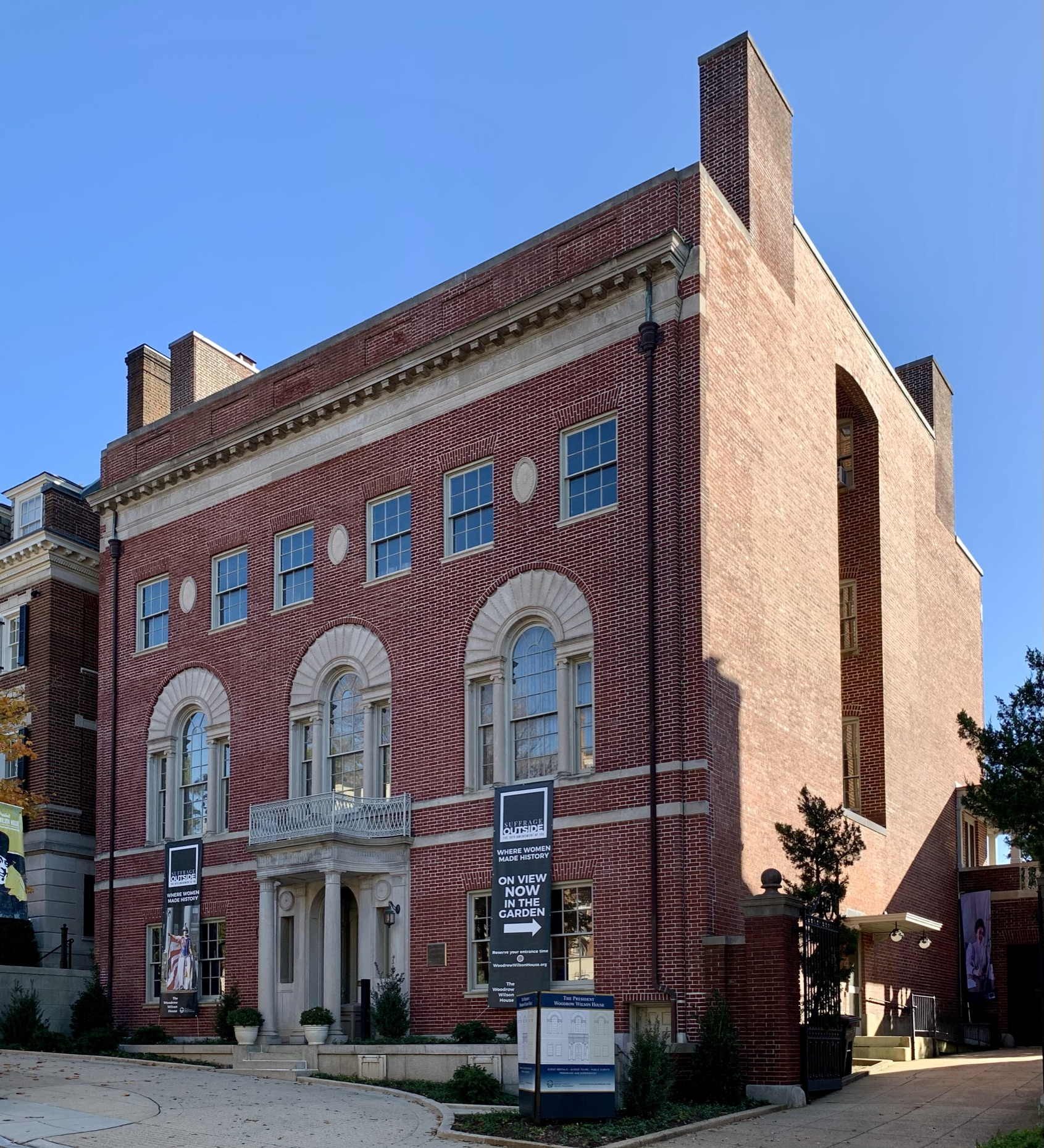
Woodrow Wilson House (Washington, D.C.), built in 1915

- Emory College is rechartered as Emory University, and plans to move its main campus from Oxford, Georgia to Atlanta.
- The first stop sign appears in Detroit, Michigan.
- Colonel Francis G. Ward Pumping Station in Buffalo, New York, the largest in the US at this time, begins operation.
- Woman's Peace Party organized.
- Thomas Lyle Williams produces the mascara Maybelline.
- Only year in which all five surviving Marx Brothers appear together on stage.
- Carrier Engineering, predecessor of Carrier Global, a global air conditioning brand, is founded in New Jersey, United States.
- The WWI song Just for the Sake of Gold is published.

=== Ongoing ===
- Progressive Era (1890s–1920s)
- Lochner era (c. 1897–c. 1937)
- U.S. occupation of Haiti (1915–1934)

== Births ==
- January 1 – Tom Godwin, science fiction author (died 1980)
- January 2 – John Hope Franklin, historian (died 2009)
- January 3 – Sid Hudson, baseball player (died 2008)
- January 4 – Meg Mundy, English-born actress (died 2016)
- January 5 – Arthur H. Robinson, geographer and cartographer (died 2004)
- January 6 – Don Edwards, politician (died 2015)
- January 9 – Anita Louise, actress (died 1970)
- January 14 – Mark Goodson, television game show producer (died 1992)
- January 16 – Leslie H. Martinson, television and film director (died 2016)
- January 20 – Edward Stewart, set decorator (died 1999)
- January 22 – C. L. Franklin, minister and Civil Rights Activist, father of Aretha Franklin (died 1984)
- January 24 – Robert Motherwell, painter (died 1991)
- January 29
  - Albert Henderson, actor (died 2004)
  - John Serry, Sr., musician, composer and arranger (died 2003)
- January 30 – Ed Keats, admiral (died 2019)
- January 31
  - Alan Lomax, folklorist and musicologist (died 2002)
  - Thomas Merton, monk and author (died 1968)
- February 1 – Alicia Rhett, actress (died 2014)
- February 5 – Robert Hofstadter, physicist, Nobel Prize laureate (d. 1990)
- February 10 – Karl Winsch, baseball player and manager (died 2001)
- February 12
  - Richard G. Colbert, admiral (died 1973)
  - Andrew Goodpaster, general (died 2005)
- February 14 – Ray Evans, composer (died 2007)
- February 16 – Jim O'Hora, college football coach (died 2005)
- February 19 – Fred Freiberger, screenwriter and television producer (died 2003)
- February 21 – Ann Sheridan, film actress (died 1967)
- February 23 – Paul Tibbets, World War II bomber pilot (Enola Gay) (died 2007)
- February 26 – Preacher Roe, baseball player (died 2008)
- February 27 – Dick Crockett, actor and stunt performer (died 1979)
- February 28 – Zero Mostel, born Samuel Mostel, film and stage actor (died 1977)
- March 1 – Elizabeth Peet McIntosh, spy (died 2015)
- March 15 – Carl Emil Schorske, cultural historian (died 2015)
- March 18 – Richard Condon, political novelist (died 1996)
- March 20
  - Marie M. Runyon, political activist (died 2018)
  - Sister Rosetta Tharpe, gospel singer (died 1973)
- March 23 – Jack Rollins, film and television producer (died 2015)
- March 27 – Robert Lockwood Jr., musician (died 2006)
- March 29 – Helen Yglesias, novelist (died 2008)
- April 7
  - Stanley Adams, actor (died 1977)
  - Bernadette Armiger, Catholic nun and president of the American Association of Colleges of Nursing (died 1979)
  - Albert O. Hirschman, German-born economist (died 2012)
  - Billie Holiday, born Eleanora Fagan, African-American jazz blues singer (died 1959)
- April 12 – George Hogan, basketball player (died 1965)
- April 16 – Joan Alexander, actress (died 2009)
- May 1 – Archie Williams, athlete (died 1993)
- May 2
  - Van Alexander, bandleader, arranger and composer (died 2015)
  - Doris Fisher, singer and songwriter (died 2003)
- May 5 – Alice Faye, entertainer (died 1998)
- May 6 – Orson Welles, actor and director (died 1985)
- May 8 – Milton Meltzer, historical writer (died 2009)
- May 15
  - Ida Keeling, centenarian track and field athlete (died 2021)
  - Paul Samuelson, economist, Nobel Prize laureate (died 2009)
- May 26 – Sam Edwards, actor (died 2004)
- May 27 – Herman Wouk, novelist (died 2019)
- June 1 – John Randolph, actor (died 2004)
- June 2 – Jason Lee, politician and judge (died 1980)
- June 10 – Saul Bellow, Canadian-born novelist, Nobel Prize laureate (died 2005)
- June 12
  - William MacVane, surgeon and politician (died 2010)
  - David Rockefeller, banker and philanthropist (died 2017)
- June 15 – Thomas Huckle Weller, virologist, Nobel Prize laureate (died 2008)
- June 17
  - David "Stringbean" Akeman, country music banjo player (died 1973)
  - Walter J. Zable, American founder and CEO of Cubic Corporation (died 2012)
- June 19 – Pat Buttram, actor (died 1994)
- June 22 – Randolph Hokanson, pianist (died 2018)
- June 24 – Bill Radovich, American football guard (died 2002)
- June 25 – Floyd Boring, Secret Service agent (died 2008)
- June 26 – Charlotte Zolotow, author (died 2013)
- June 27 – John Alexander Moore, zoologist (died 2002)
- June 28 – David "Honeyboy" Edwards, musician (died 2011)
- June 29 – John Charles Cutler, surgeon (died 2003)
- June 30 – Robert E. Hopkins, optical engineer (died 2009)
- July 1 – Willie Dixon, blues musician (died 1992)
- July 3 – Ralph Chapin, businessman and Zen practitioner (died 2000)
- July 4 – Timmie Rogers, actor and singer-songwriter (died 2006)
- July 5 – John Woodruff, African-American middle-distance runner (died 2007)
- July 7
  - Peter H. Dominick, U.S. Senator from Colorado from 1963 to 1975 (died 1981)
  - Reynaldo Guerra Garza, federal judge (died 2004)
  - Billy Mure, guitarist (died 2013)
- July 8 – Neil D. Van Sickle, American Air Force major general (died 2019)
- July 9 – Joan Tompkins, actress (died 2005)
- July 12 – Emanuel Papper, anesthesiologist (died 2002)
- July 13 – Paul Williams, jazz and blues saxophonist (died 2002)
- July 15
  - William O. Baker, scientist and businessman, president of Bell Labs (died 2005)
  - Albert Ghiorso, nuclear scientist (died 2010)
- July 16 – Elaine Barrie, actress (died 2003)
- July 17 – Fred Ball, movie studio executive, actor and brother of Lucille Ball (died 2007)
- July 18 – Roxana Cannon Arsht, judge (died 2003)
- July 20 – Gene Hasson, Major League baseball player (died 2003)
- July 28
  - Red Barrett, baseball player (died 1990)
  - Dick Sprang, comic book artist during the golden age of comics and explorer (died 2000)
  - Charles Townes, physicist, Nobel Prize laureate (died 2015)
  - Frankie Yankovic, accordion player (died 1998)
- August 2 – Gary Merrill, actor (died 1990)
- August 4 – William Keene, actor (died 1992)
- August 5 – Mildred Burke, professional wrestler (died 1989)
- August 8
  - Alex Schoenbaum, collegiate football player and businessman (died 1996)
  - Joseph P. Graw, businessman and politician (died 2018)
- August 9 – George W. BonDurant, preacher and academic administrator (died 2017)
- August 12
  - Michael Kidd, choreographer (died 2007)
  - Donald Pellmann, masters athlete (died 2020)
- August 13 – Katherine Loker, née Bogdanovich, philanthropist (died 2008)
- August 14 – Irene Hickson, baseball player (died 1995)
- August 16 – Herbert Greenwald, real estate developer (died 1959)
- August 19 – Ring Lardner Jr., film screenwriter (died 2000)
- August 24 – Dave McCoy, founder of the Mammoth Mountain Ski Area (died 2020)
- August 25
  - Norman Foster Ramsey, Jr., physicist, Nobel Prize laureate (died 2011)
  - Walter Trampler, violist (died 1997)
- August 27 – Norman F. Ramsey, physicist, Nobel Prize laureate (died 2011)
- August 28
  - Tol Avery, actor (died 1973)
  - Simon Oakland, actor (died 1983)
  - Tasha Tudor, illustrator (died 2008)
- August 30 – Robert Strassburg, composer (died 2003)
- September 8 – Frank Cady, actor (died 2012)
- September 23
  - Julius Baker, flautist (died 2003)
  - Clifford Shull, physicist, Nobel Prize laureate (died 2001)
- September 24 – Joseph Montoya, politician (died 1978)
- September 29
  - Vincent DeDomenico, entrepreneur (died 2007)
  - Brenda Marshall, actress (died 1992)
- October 1 – Jerome Bruner, developmental and educational psychologist (died 2016)
- October 2 – Chuck Williams, businessman and author (died 2015)
- October 4 – Beverly Loraine Greene, African-American architect (died 1957)
- October 6 – Ralph Tyler Smith, U.S. Senator from Illinois from 1969 to 1970 (died 1972)
- October 7 – Walter Keane, plagiarist (died 2000)
- October 17
  - John J. McKetta, chemical engineer (died 2019)
  - Arthur Miller, playwright and essayist (died 2005)
- October 24
  - Letitia Woods Brown, African-American academic historian (died 1976)
  - Bob Kane, author and illustrator (died 1998)
  - Roger Milliken, businessman (died 2010)
- October 29 – William Berenberg, physician (died 2005)
- November 1 – Frances Hesselbein, President of the Girl Scouts of the USA, CEO of the Frances Hesselbein Leadership Institute (died 2022)
- November 9 – Sargent Shriver, Peace Corps founder (died 2011)
- November 14 – Billy Bauer, cool jazz guitarist (died 2005)
- November 18 – James Whittico Jr., physician (died 2018)
- November 19 – Earl Wilbur Sutherland Jr., physiologist, Nobel Prize laureate (died 1974)
- November 20 – Bill Daniel, politician (died 2006)
- November 26 – Earl Wild, pianist (died 2010)
- November 29
  - Eugene Polley, electronics engineer (died 2012)
  - Billy Strayhorn, composer, pianist and jazz innovator (died 1967)
- November 30 – Brownie McGhee, Piedmont blues musician (died 1996)
- December 12 – Frank Sinatra, singer and actor (died 1998)
- December 15 – Charles F. Wheeler, cinematographer (died 2004)
- December 18 – Bill Zuckert, actor (died 1997)
- December 27 – Mary Kornman, child actress (died 1973)

== Deaths ==
- January 19 – Abram J. Buckles, soldier and jurist (born 1846)
- February 18 – Frank James, outlaw (born 1843)
- March 5 – Thomas R. Bard, U.S. Senator from California from 1900 until 1905 (born 1841)
- March 15 – Joseph Ackroyd, member of the New York State Senate (born 1847)
- April 1 – Laura Alberta Linton, American chemist (born 1853)
- April 14 – John Englehart, Northwest Frontier painter (born 1867)
- April 16 – Nelson W. Aldrich, U.S. Senator from Rhode Island from 1881 until 1911 (born 1841)
- April 26 – John Bunny, silent film comedian (born 1863)
- April 29 – John R. Lindgren, founder of the banking firm Haugan & Lindgren (born 1855)
- May 7 – Sinking of the RMS Lusitania:
  - Justus Miles Forman, writer (born 1875)
  - Charles Frohman, theater producer (born 1856)
  - Elbert Hubbard, writer and philosopher (born 1856)
  - Alice Moore Hubbard, wife of Elbert (born 1861)
  - Charles Klein, playwright (born 1867)
  - Alfred Gwynne Vanderbilt, sportsman (born 1877)
- June 19 – Benjamin F. Isherwood, admiral (born 1822)
- July 16 – Ellen G. White, co-founder of the Seventh-day Adventist Church (born 1827)
- August 25 – Henry Overholser, businessman (born 1846)
- September 13 – Andrew L. Harris, Civil War hero and Governor of Ohio (born 1835)
- October 10 – Albert Cashier, born Jennie Hodgers, soldier (born 1843 in Ireland)
- November 14 – Booker T. Washington, African-American educator (born 1856)
- November 16 – Julius C. Burrows, U.S. Senator from Michigan from 1895 until 1911 (born 1837)
- November 21 – Dixie Haygood, magician (born 1861)
- December 22 – Rose Talbot Bullard, physician (born 1864)

== See also ==
- List of American films of 1915
- Timeline of United States history (1900–1929)
