= Abb Landis =

American lawyer (1856–1927)

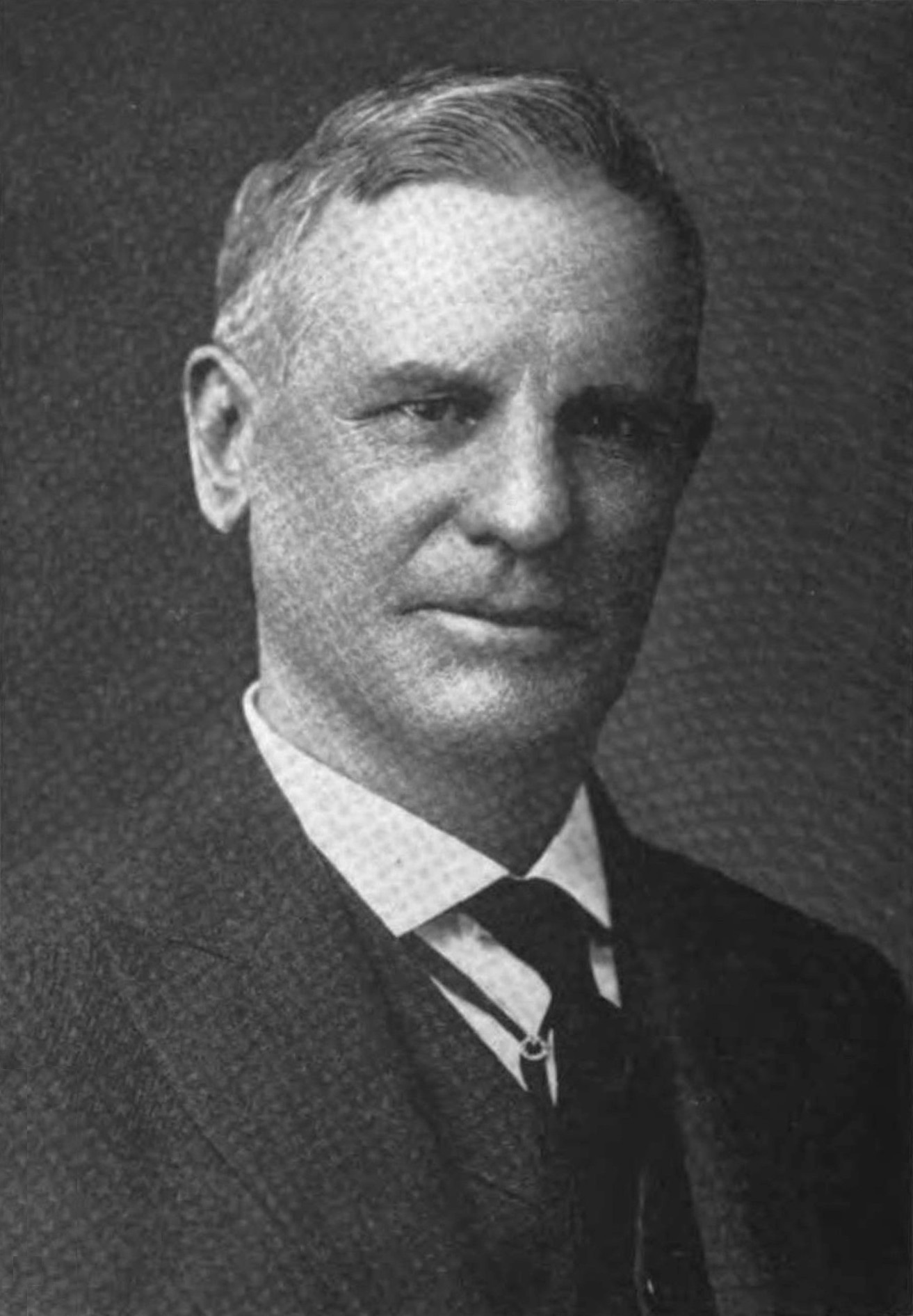
- Born: Absalom Lowe Landis Jr. August 9, 1856; Bedford County, Tennessee
- Died: December 9, 1927 (aged 71); Nashville, Tennessee
- Education: University of Nashville
- Occupations: Lawyer, newspaper publisher, actuary

Abb Lowe Landis (Note: There is little evidence that he ever used his birth name, Absalom. An older brother, Absalom Melville Landis, died before he was born. His tombstone at Nashville's Mount Olivet Cemetery bears the name Abb Lowe Landis.) (August 9, 1856 – December 9, 1927) was an American lawyer, newspaper publisher, and actuary.

== Early life and education ==
Absalom Lowe Landis Jr. was born in Bedford County, Tennessee, on August 9, 1856, to A. L. Landis (1823–1896), a plantation owner. After the outbreak of the American Civil War, his father served as a major in the Confederate States Army. Upon his return to Tennessee, he arranged for the construction a new family residence, Beech Hall, which is now on the U.S. National Register of Historic Places. His father later served a term in the Tennessee House of Representatives from 1877 to 1879 and a term in the Tennessee State Senate from 1879 to 1881.

One of eleven children, Abb Landis graduated from the University of Nashville in 1875. He then took additional courses at Vanderbilt University until 1876. Landis completed legal studies at Cumberland University's law school (now the Cumberland Law School at Samford University) in 1879, but did not receive a law degree.

== Career ==
Landis practiced law for three years in Shelbyville, Tennessee, where he was also owner and editor of the Shelbyville Gazette from 1881 to 1882. In January 1883, he became an editor of the Nashville Banner. Landis soon became editor-in-chief and within six months acquired a controlling interest in the newspaper. After the Banner exposed Tennessee industrialist Arthur St. Clair Colyar's involvement in convict leasing, a bitter legal fight ensued and Landis sold the Banner in 1885.

Landis next moved to Florida, where he managed legal affairs for a New England company which owned three hundred thousand acres in the state. He contracted malaria in 1887 and was forced to move back north. In 1888, his father moved from Bedford County to Nashville, Tennessee to start a brokerage business which also performed real estate and railroad accident adjustment services. Abb Landis and two of his brothers joined the new firm.

Landis began working in fraternal insurance starting in 1889. He was elected a fellow of the Casualty Actuarial Society in 1915, and, five years later, was given an equivalent honor by the American Statistical Association. Landis died in Nashville on December 9, 1927.

== Personal ==
Landis married Mary Alma Word on August 18, 1880. They had a son and a daughter.
