= Hugh C. Anderson =

American lawyer, businessman and politician (1851–1915)

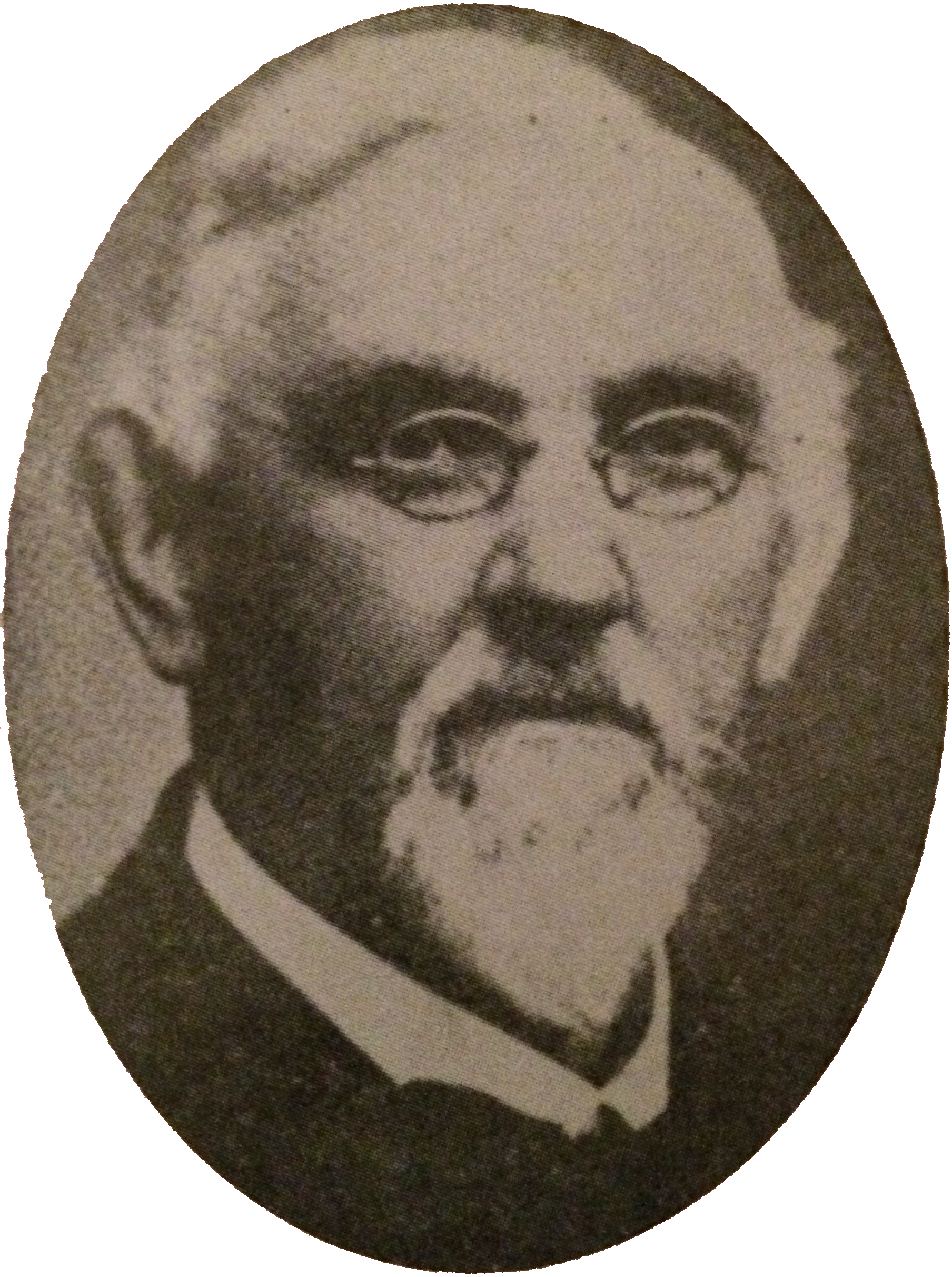

24th Speaker of the Tennessee Senate
- In office January 4, 1915 – March 1, 1915
- Preceded by: Newton H. White
- Succeeded by: Albert E. Hill

Member of the Tennessee Senate from the 25th district
- In office January 4, 1915 – March 1, 1915
- Preceded by: John L. Hare
- Succeeded by: Eugene Fulgham

Member of the Tennessee House of Representatives
- In office February 26, 1881 – January 1, 1883
- Preceded by: Howell E. Jackson
- Succeeded by: R. W. Haynes
- Constituency: Madison
- In office January 6, 1879 – January 3, 1881
- Preceded by: George C. Porter
- Succeeded by: H. E. Austin
- Constituency: Haywood, Hardeman, and Madison

Personal details
- Born: Hugh Crump Anderson; February 2, 1851 McNairy, Tennessee, U.S.
- Died: March 1, 1915 (aged 64) Nashville, Tennessee, U.S.
- Party: Democratic
- Spouse: Lena Burdett
- Education: Cumberland University
- Occupation: Lawyer, businessman, politician

Hugh Crump Anderson (February 2, 1851 – March 1, 1915) was an American lawyer, businessman and politician. He served as the long-term mayor of Jackson, Tennessee. He served as the lieutenant governor of Tennessee in 1915.

== Early life ==
Hugh Crump Anderson was born on February 2, 1851, in McNairy County, Tennessee. His family moved to Jackson, Tennessee, in 1869.

Anderson graduated with a law degree from Cumberland University in Lebanon, Tennessee, in 1873. While in college, in 1870, he joined Sigma Alpha Epsilon.

== Career ==
Anderson worked as a lawyer from 1873 to 1889.

Anderson joined the Democratic Party. He served as city attorney for Jackson, Tennessee from 1874 to 1875. Anderson served as a member of the Tennessee House of Representatives from 1879 to 1883. He served as the mayor of Jackson from 1884 to 1900. He was also an assistant United States Attorney for the Western District of Tennessee between 1885 and 1889. Anderson was elected to the Tennessee Senate in 1914. He briefly served as Speaker of the Senate and Lieutenant Governor of Tennessee until his death in 1915.

Anderson served as the president of the First National Bank of Jackson, Tennessee. He was also the president of the Electric Light Company.

He was a member of the Knights of Pythias.

== Personal life ==
Anderson was the son of William Taylor Anderson and his wife Mahala Wisdom.

Anderson married Helen Bond (1855–1878). They had two sons. After his first wife's death, Anderson married Emma Burdette (1863–1899). They had a son and a daughter. His third marriage was to Ellen Bond (1854–1918).

== Death ==
Anderson died on March 1, 1915, in Nashville, Tennessee. He was interred at Riverside Cemetery in Jackson, Tennessee.
