= Robert Martin Lusk =

American lawyer and politician

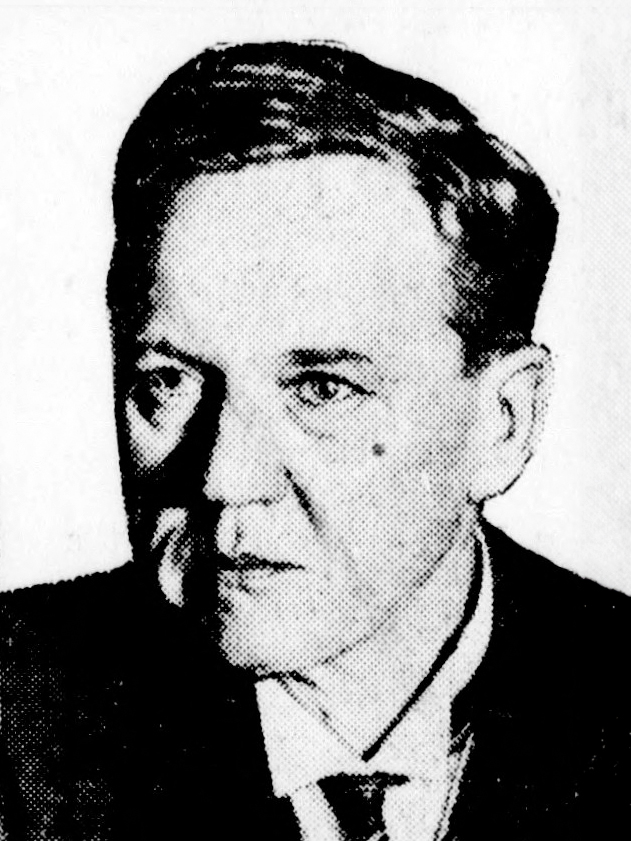

President of the Los Angeles City Council
- In office March 22, 1910 – January 2, 1912
- Preceded by: John D. Works
- Succeeded by: George Williams

Member of the Los Angeles City Council for the at-large district
- In office December 10, 1909 – February 21, 1913
- Preceded by: District established
- Succeeded by: Frank True

Personal details
- Born: January 25, 1851 Bradley County, Tennessee
- Died: February 21, 1913 (aged 62) Boyle Heights, Los Angeles, California, U.S.
- Party: Republican
- Other political affiliations: Good Government
- Spouse: Clara Pope (m. 1874)
- Children: 8
- Education: Hiwassee College
- Alma mater: Cumberland University

Robert Martin Lusk (January 25, 1851 – February 21, 1913) was a lawyer, politician and judge in Texas and California.

Lusk was born in Bradley County, Tennessee, in 1851. He attended Hiwassee College and was graduated from the law department at Cumberland University, both in Tennessee. He practiced law in Dalton, Georgia, and in Bonham, Texas, where he was elected mayor and was then prosecuting attorney for the county. In 1885 he was elected to the Texas State Legislature. He was a superior court judge in Texas in 1888–89.

Lusk moved to Los Angeles in 1902 and joined a reform movement in the city. In the first nonpartisan campaign under a new city charter, he was a candidate for tax collector. In 1905 he was appointed to the council to fill the unexpired term of John D. Works, who was running for the U.S. Senate. Lusk was then elected to a four-year term.

He died in his Los Angeles home at 147 North Soto Street on February 21, 1913, and a funeral service was held two days later at Boyle Heights Presbyterian Church, conducted by the Reverend L. C. Kirkes, pastor. Interment was at Evergreen Cemetery, Los Angeles.

He was survived by his wife, three daughters, Ruth, Mrs. C. A. Mills and Mrs. Frank Miller; and two sons, Henry and Paul.
