= Newton Harris White =

American politician (1860–1931)

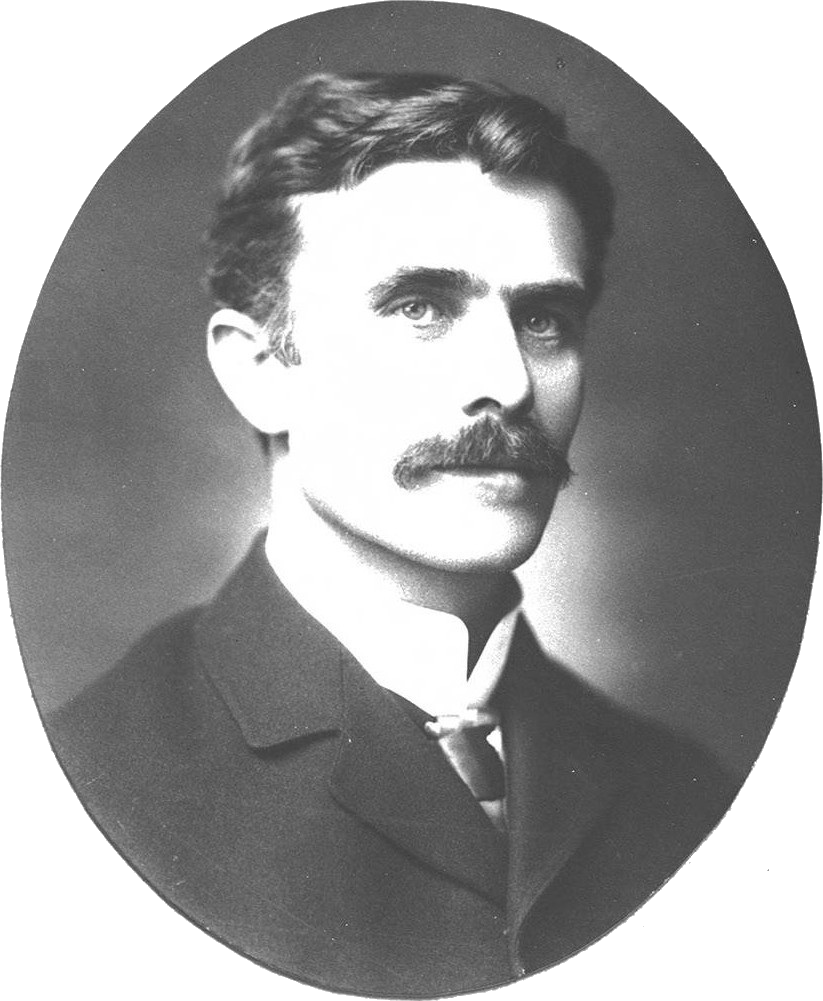
- Newton H. White in 1901
- Born: September 2, 1860; Giles County, Tennessee, U.S.
- Died: March 3, 1931 (aged 70); Nashville, Tennessee, U.S.
- Occupations: Farmer, politician
- Political party: Democratic Party
- Spouse: Halle May Gardner
- Parent(s): Newton White; Courtney Sivils Gordon

Newton Harris White (September 2, 1860 – March 3, 1931) was an American farmer and politician. He served two terms as Speaker of the Tennessee Senate.

White was born on September 2, 1860 in Giles County, Tennessee. After receiving his early education in Pulaski, Tennessee, he attended the Webb School in Culleoka, Tennessee. White became a successful farmer and one of the largest livestock producers in the state. His residence was "Hazelhurst" at Wales just north of Pulaski.

White was elected as a Democratic member of the Tennessee House of Representatives in 1899. He served as the Speaker of the Tennessee Senate from 1901 to 1903, and from 1913 to 1915. After serving as Speaker for the second time, White continued to serve in the Senate for one more term representing Giles County until 1917. White died on March 3, 1931 in Nashville, Tennessee and was buried in Pulaski.

He is the father of Captain Newton Harris White, Jr., a 1907 graduate of the U.S. Naval Academy. Newton White, Jr. was an early naval aviator, the first commanding officer of the USS Enterprise in 1938, and owner of the Newton White Mansion in Mitchellville, Maryland.
