= Albert E. Hill =

American politician (1870–1933)

- Hill in 1899

Member of the Tennessee House of Representatives
- In office 1895–1901
- In office 1913–1915

Tennessee State Senator
- In office 1915–1921

Speaker of the Tennessee Senate
- In office March 1915 – January 1917
- Preceded by: Hugh C. Anderson
- Succeeded by: W. R. Crabtree

Personal details
- Born: October 14, 1870 Nashville, Tennessee
- Died: January 23, 1933 (aged 62) Nashville, Tennessee
- Party: Democratic
- Profession: typographer, labor advocate

Albert Ewing Hill (October 14, 1870 – January 23, 1933) was an American politician. He served as a member of the Tennessee House of Representatives and the Tennessee Senate, including as Speaker of the Senate from 1915 to 1917. He supported the labor movement and public education.

== Early life ==
Hill was born in Nashville, Tennessee on October 14, 1870. He attended the local schools and after secondary school found work in the printing industry.

== Career ==
Hill was a member of Nashville Typographical Union No. 2 and served as its president for eighteen years.

Hill served as a member of the Tennessee House of Representatives and the Tennessee Senate. He was first elected to the house in 1894 as a Democrat representing Davidson County. Hill served from 1895 to 1901 and was later re-elected to represent Davidson and Wilson Counties from 1913 to 1915. He then served in the senate representing Davidson County from 1915 to 1921. Hill was elected speaker in 1915 after the death of Hugh C. Anderson and held the office until 1917. Both in the house and the senate, he supported "advances for labor and public schools." During an August 1920 special session of the Tennessee General Assembly, Hill was Democratic senate floor leader and John C. Houk was Republican senate floor leader supporting ratification of the Nineteenth Amendment granting women the right to vote.

Hill was the founder of the Tennessee State Federation of Labor, and the chair of the Southern chapter of the International Typographical Union. He was also the president of the Nashville Board of Education, and the founder and publisher of the Nashville Labor Advocate.

== Death ==
Hill died on January 23, 1933, in Nashville, Tennessee. He was interred at Mount Olivet Cemetery. A memorial service was held at the East Nashville High School on February 6.

== Family ==
Hill was the son of William H. "Major" Hill and his wife Catherine J. "Kate" Ewing. His father served as a Confederate soldier in the 20th Tennessee Infantry Regiment during the American Civil War.

Around 1895, Hill married Nellie Jones. They had a son and a daughter. It is not clear whether he was widowed or divorced, but by 1910, Hill and their children were living in Nashville with his mother and unmarried older sister.

On June 30, 1917, Hill married Mabel Jones (April 9, 1884 – October 4, 1956). She was active in the community, serving as president of Davidson County League of Women Voters from 1918 to 1922 and president of the Tennessee Baptist Missionary Union from 1920 to 1923. They had a son, but after her husband's death in January 1933, she again became active in the community. She served on the Nashville Board of Education from 1933 to 1938 and became president of the Tennessee Association for Planned Parenthood from 1939 to 1941.

Mabel Jones Hill became a member of the Tennessee State Democratic Committee in 1938 and the Tennessee women's representative on the Democratic National Committee in 1940. In September 1944, when Gladys Avery Tillett was vice chair of the committee and head of the women's division, Mrs. Hill became head of the speakers' bureau of the division. She served on the national committee until 1952, and was re-elected in July 1956. She had continued to serve on the Tennessee state committee, and was appointed director of its women's division just two days before her death.
