= Ed Keats =

United States Navy admiral (1915–2019)

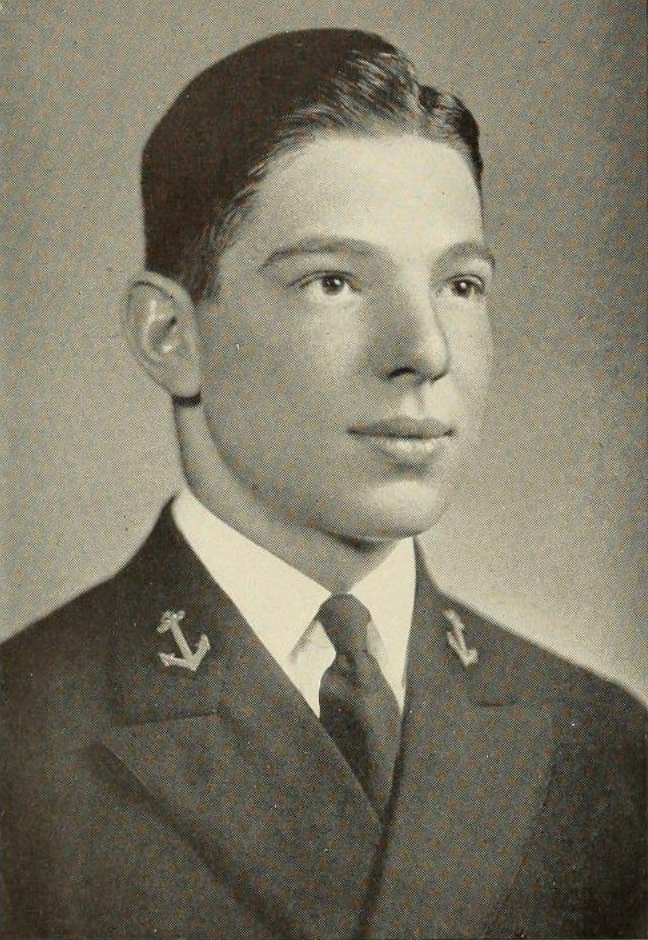
- Keats' portrait in Lucky Bag 1935, United States Naval Academy yearbook
- Born: Edgar Salo Keats; January 30, 1915; Chicago, Illinois, United States
- Died: March 2, 2019 (aged 104); Towson, Maryland, United States
- Burial place: Druid Ridge Cemetery
- Military career
- Allegiance: United States
- Branch: United States Navy
- Service years: 1935–1968
- Rank: Rear admiral
- Conflicts: World War II; Iwo Jima; Tarawa; Saipan; Okinawa

Edgar Salo Keats (January 30, 1915 – March 2, 2019) was a rear admiral in the United States Navy. At the time of his death, he was the oldest living graduate of United States Naval Academy. Keats graduated from the USNA in 1935.

Keats was a naval aviator. He was promoted to rear admiral shortly before his retirement in 1958. Following military service, he held civilian positions of leadership in the defense and construction sectors. Late in his life, he won gold medals in the Maryland Senior Olympics. He turned 100 in January 2015. He died on March 2, 2019, at the age of 104 from complications of a fall.
