= Samuel Franklin Wilson =

American politician (1845–1923)

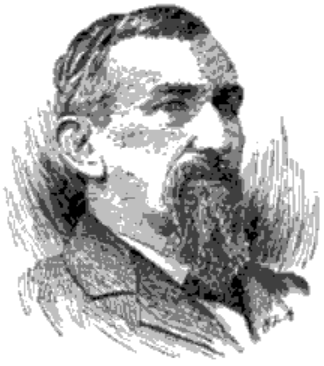

Member of the Tennessee Senate
- In office 1879–1880

Member of the Tennessee House of Representatives
- In office 1877–1879
- Constituency: Sumner County

Personal details
- Born: April 18, 1845 Sumner County, Tennessee, U.S.
- Died: June 14, 1923 (aged 78) Knoxville, Tennessee, U.S.
- Party: Democratic Party
- Spouse: Mary Lytton Bostick (m. 1880)
- Children: 2 sons, 3 daughters
- Parent(s): Samuel Wilson; Nancy Moore
- Relatives: Edgar Bright Wilson (nephew)
- Education: University of Georgia (A.B.); Cumberland University (LL.B.)
- Occupation: Jurist, politician

Samuel Franklin Wilson (1845-1923) was an American Confederate veteran, politician and judge.

== Early life ==
Samuel Franklin Wilson was born on April 18, 1845, in Sumner County, Tennessee. He was of English descent. During paternal great-great-uncle, Zachary Wilson, was a signatory of the Mecklenburg Declaration of Independence. His father was Samuel Wilson and his mother, Nancy Moore. He had seven siblings.

During the American Civil War of 1861–1865, he served under Colonel William B. Bate and General Edmund Kirby Smith in the Confederate States Army. He lost an arm at the Battle of Chickamauga.

After the war, Wilson graduated from the University of Georgia with an A.B. degree in 1868. He received an LL.B. degree from Cumberland University in 1869.

== Career ==
Wilson practised the law in Gallatin, Tennessee.

Wilson was a member of the Democratic Party. He served in the Tennessee House of Representatives from 1877 to 1879, sitting on the judiciary committee. He was elected to the Tennessee Senate in 1879, and served as the chairman of its judiciary committee. He was elected by the "low taxers" to represent Tennessee at the 1880 Democratic National Convention, but he lost to Alvin Hawkins.

Wilson was appointed as a United States Marshal from 1885 to 1889, under President Grover Cleveland. He served as a Judge on the Tennessee Court of Chancery Appeals from 1895 to 1901.

== Personal life and death ==
Wilson married Mary Lytton Bostick on August 19, 1880. They had two sons and three daughters. He died in Knoxville on June 14, 1923.
