= Alexander William Campbell (general) =

American brigadier general (1828–1893)

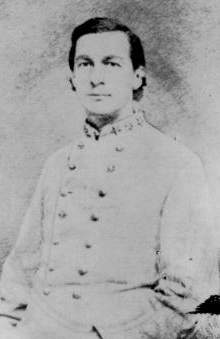
- Col. A.W. Campbell
- Born: June 4, 1828; Nashville, Tennessee
- Died: June 13, 1893 (aged 65); Jackson, Tennessee
- Burial place: Riverside Cemetery, Jackson, Tennessee
- Military career
- Allegiance: Confederate States of America
- Branch: Confederate States Army
- Service years: 1861–1865
- Rank: Brigadier General
- Units: 33rd Tennessee Infantry Regiment; Cavalry Brigade, W.H. Jackson's Cavalry Division
- Conflicts: American Civil War
- Other work: Lawyer, Banker

Alexander William Campbell (June 4, 1828 – June 13, 1893) was a Confederate States Army brigadier general during the American Civil War. He was a lawyer in Tennessee before and after the war, mayor of Jackson, Tennessee, 1856, and an unsuccessful candidate for the Democratic Party nomination for governor of Tennessee in 1880.

== Early life ==
Alexander William Campbell was born on June 4, 1828, in Nashville, Tennessee. After graduating from West Tennessee College, he studied law at Cumberland University. He was admitted to the bar of Tennessee and became a partner of future United States Senator and United States Supreme Court justice, Howell E. Jackson. He was elected mayor of Jackson, Tennessee, in 1856.

== American Civil War ==
Alexander William Campbell enlisted in the Confederate States Army as a private. On or about May 9, 1861, he was appointed major and assigned to duty as assistant inspector general of the Provisional Army of Tennessee. He was promoted to colonel of the 33rd Tennessee Volunteer Infantry Regiment on October 18, 1861. Campbell's regiment was in reserve at the Battle of Belmont. His regiment had been a part of the army that marched from Central Kentucky to Corinth, Mississippi. Campbell was severely wounded as he led his regiment at the Battle of Shiloh. After several months convalescence, he returned to find that he had not been re-elected colonel of the regiment on its reorganization on May 8, 1862.

Upon his return to active duty, just before the Battle of Stones River, Campbell was appointed assistant adjutant and inspector general for Lieutenant General Leonidas Polk. After this assignment, he served with the Tennessee volunteer and conscription bureau under Brigadier General Gideon Pillow.

Sent on a mission for Tennessee Governor Isham G. Harris to supervise elections and to recruit new soldiers in the western part of Tennessee, Campbell was taken prisoner by Union forces at Lexington, Tennessee, in July 1863. He was not exchanged until February 1865. On February 18, 1865, Campbell was appointed acting inspector general for Lieutenant General Nathan Bedford Forrest. Later in the month, according to Sifakis, or on March 1, 1865, according to Eicher, Campbell was given command of a brigade in Brigadier General William H. Jackson's division of Lieutenant General Forrest's cavalry corps, with which he served until the end of the war. On March 1, 1865, Campbell was commissioned as a brigadier general in the Confederate Army. He was paroled at Gainesville, Alabama, on May 11, 1865.

== Aftermath ==
After the Civil War, Campbell returned to Jackson, Tennessee and resumed his practice of law. He also was engaged as a banker. He unsuccessfully sought the Democratic Party nomination for governor of Tennessee in 1880. He died on June 13, 1893, at Jackson. Alexander William Campbell was buried in Riverside Cemetery, Jackson, Tennessee.

== See also ==
List of American Civil War Generals (Confederate)
