= Just for the Sake of Gold =

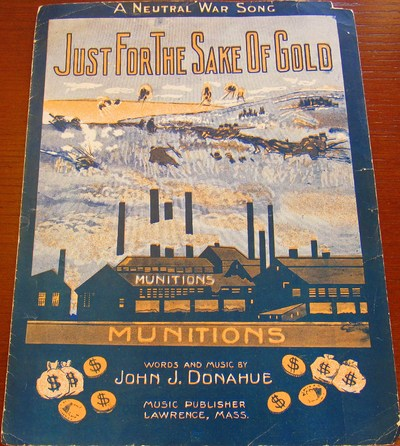
- Sheet music cover found at Pritzker Military Museum & Library

Song
- Released: 1915
- Label: Donahue Music
- Songwriter(s): John J. Donahue

"Just for the Sake of Gold" is a World War I era song released in 1915. Lyrics and music were written by John J. Donahue. The song was published by Donahue Music of Lawrence, Massachusetts. On the sheet music cover is a battle scene taking place behind a munitions factory.

The sheet music can be found at Pritzker Military Museum & Library.
