= Edgar Bright Wilson (politician) =

American lawyer and politician

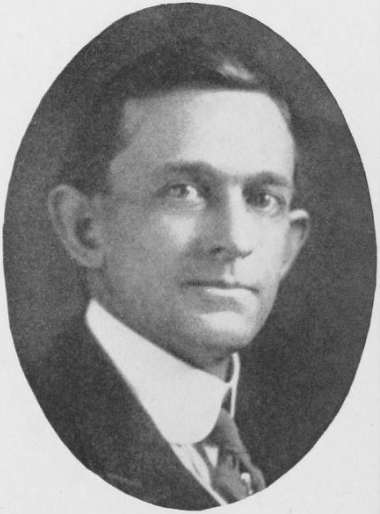
- Born: July 27, 1874; Chapel Hill, Tennessee, U.S.
- Died: February 5, 1953 (aged 78); Washington, D.C., U.S.
- Education: Chapel Hill Academy
- Alma mater: Cumberland University
- Occupations: Lawyer, politician
- Political party: Democratic Party
- Spouse: Anna Lackey (m. 1902)
- Children: Edgar Bright Wilson Jr.
- Parent(s): James A. Wilson; Mary Graves
- Relatives: Samuel Franklin Wilson (paternal uncle)

Edgar Bright Wilson (1874–1953) was an American lawyer and politician. He served as the Speaker of the Tennessee House of Representatives from 1901 to 1903.

== Early life ==
Edgar Brighton Wilson was born in Chapel Hill, Tennessee on July 27, 1874. His father, James A. Wilson, was a veteran of the Confederate States Army during the American Civil War. His mother was Mary Graves. His paternal uncle, Samuel Franklin Wilson, was a Confederate veteran and a judge.

Wilson was educated at the Chapel Hill Academy. He graduated from Cumberland University in 1893. He studied the law under his uncle, and he was admitted to the bar in 1894.

== Career ==
Wilson practiced the law in Gallatin, Tennessee from 1894 to 1901. He was a lawyer in Nashville, Tennessee from 1901 onward.

Wilson served as a member of the Tennessee House of Representatives from 1898 to 1903, representing Sumner County. He also served as the Speaker of the House from 1901 to 1903.

In 1908, Wilson moved to New York and began practicing law there. In 1929 he was barred from practicing in the United States District Court for the Southern District of New York by Judge Thomas D. Thacher, who found that Wilson had gifted a car that was the property of a company he was the receiver of to the stepson of Francis A. Winslow, who was under investigation following allegations of impropriety in the selection of court-appointed receivers. Wilson resigned from the New York State Bar on December 30, 1929.

== Personal life and death ==
Wilson married Anna Lackey in 1902. He was a Freemason and a member of the Knights of Pythias. He was a Presbyterian. He died at his home in Washington, D.C. on February 5, 1953.
