= Howell E. Jackson =

US Supreme Court justice from 1893 to 1895

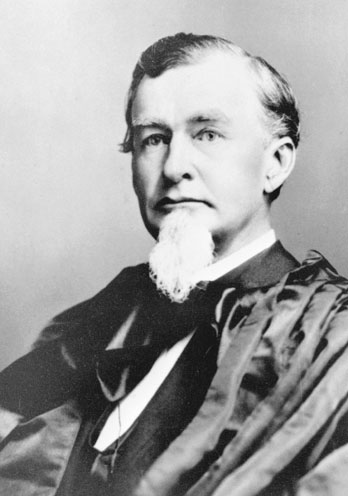
- Jackson as Supreme Court Justice, c. 1893-1895

Associate Justice of the Supreme Court of the United States
- In office March 4, 1893 – August 8, 1895
- Nominated by: Benjamin Harrison
- Preceded by: Lucius Q. C. Lamar
- Succeeded by: Rufus W. Peckham

Judge of the United States Court of Appeals for the Sixth Circuit
- In office June 16, 1891 – March 4, 1893
- Nominated by: operation of law
- Preceded by: Seat established by 26 Stat. 826
- Succeeded by: Horace Harmon Lurton

Judge of the United States Circuit Courts for the Sixth Circuit
- In office April 12, 1886 – March 4, 1893
- Nominated by: Grover Cleveland
- Preceded by: John Baxter
- Succeeded by: Horace Harmon Lurton

United States Senator from Tennessee
- In office March 4, 1881 – April 14, 1886
- Preceded by: James E. Bailey
- Succeeded by: Washington C. Whitthorne

Member of the Tennessee House of Representatives from Madison County
- In office January 3, 1881 – February 9, 1881
- Preceded by: Benjamin Tyson
- Succeeded by: Hugh C. Anderson

Personal details
- Born: Howell Edmunds Jackson; April 8, 1832 Paris, Tennessee, US
- Died: August 8, 1895 (aged 63) Nashville, Tennessee, US
- Resting place: Mount Olivet Cemetery
- Party: Democratic
- Education: University of Virginia; West Tennessee College (AB); Cumberland School of Law (LLB)

Howell Edmunds Jackson (April 8, 1832 – August 8, 1895) was an American attorney, politician, and jurist who served as an Associate Justice of the Supreme Court of the United States from 1893 until his death in 1895. His brief tenure on the Supreme Court is most remembered for his opinion in Pollock v. Farmers' Loan & Trust Co., in which Jackson argued in dissent that a federal income tax was constitutional. Republican President Benjamin Harrison appointed Jackson, a Democrat, to the Court. His rulings demonstrated support for broad federal power, a skepticism of states' rights and an inclination toward judicial restraint. Jackson's unexpected death after only two years of service prevented him from having a substantial impact on American jurisprudence.

Born in Paris, Tennessee, in 1832, Jackson earned a law degree from Cumberland Law School and was admitted to the bar in 1856. He briefly practiced law in Jackson before moving to Memphis, Tennessee, in 1857. Although he had initially opposed secession, he took a position as a receiver of sequestered property in the Confederate civil service after the Civil War broke out and later made several unsuccessful attempts to secure a judicial commission in the Confederate Army. He returned to the practice of law after the war, but he also took an interest in politics. After an unsuccessful run for the Tennessee Supreme Court, he was elected to a seat in the Tennessee House of Representatives in 1880. When the legislature deadlocked over the selection of a U.S. Senator, Jackson was selected as a consensus candidate, garnering bipartisan support. Despite being a loyal Democrat, he was held in high regard by fellow officeholders of both political parties, including Democrat Grover Cleveland and Republican Benjamin Harrison. When Cleveland became president, he appointed Jackson to a seat on the federal circuit court for the Sixth Circuit. While on the circuit court, he sided with businesses in a major antitrust dispute and supported an expansive view of constitutional freedoms in a civil rights case.

Shortly after President Harrison – Jackson's former Senate colleague – lost reelection to Cleveland, Supreme Court Justice Lucius Q. C. Lamar died. Harrison wanted to select a Republican to replace him, but he realized Democratic senators would likely stall the nomination until after he left office. Therefore, he chose Jackson, whom he viewed both as a close friend and a well-regarded jurist. The Senate unanimously confirmed Jackson just before Harrison left office in 1893. Not long after assuming office, Jackson developed tuberculosis, preventing him from playing a major role in Supreme Court affairs. He authored only forty-six opinions, many of which were in patent disputes or other insignificant cases. He left Washington hoping that a better climate would aid his health but returned after the remaining eight justices split 4–4 in Pollock. Yet Jackson ended up dissenting in the landmark income tax case, likely because of a change in another justice's vote. While Jackson's opinion in Pollock kept him from total obscurity, the journey to Washington also worsened his health considerably: he died on August 8, 1895, only eleven weeks after the ruling was handed down.

== Early life and career ==
Jackson was born in Paris, Tennessee, on April 8, 1832. His parents, natives of Virginia, moved to Tennessee in 1827. Jackson's father, Alexander, was a university-trained physician in a time when professional medical training was rare. A Whig, Alexander later served in the Tennessee legislature and as mayor of Jackson, Tennessee. The Jackson family moved to Madison County, Tennessee, in 1840. Howell Jackson enrolled at Western Tennessee College, where he studied Greek and Latin. After graduating in 1850, he pursued post-graduate studies at the University of Virginia for two years. Jackson then read law with A. W. O. Totten, a justice of the Tennessee Supreme Court, and with attorney and former U.S. Congressman Milton Brown. He next entered Cumberland Law School, graduating in 1856 after one year's study. Jackson was admitted to the bar that same year and began practicing law in the town of Jackson. His work there appears to have been largely unsuccessful, and he moved to the larger city of Memphis, Tennessee, in 1857. There he established a joint legal practice with David M. Currin, who later served as a Confederate congressman. The firm was successful, and it provided Jackson with experience in corporate litigation.

Tennessee seceded from the Union in 1861. Although Jackson had opposed secession, he supported the Southern side in the war that followed. Judge West H. Humphreys appointed Jackson to enforce Confederate sequestration law in western Tennessee, placing him in charge of confiscating and selling the property of Union loyalists. Extant newspaper accounts show Jackson auctioned off a wide variety of property, including almonds, pickles, chairs, alcohol, tobacco and dried peaches. Just before the Union recaptured Memphis in 1862, Jackson fled with his family to LaGrange, Georgia. He attempted unsuccessfully to secure a position in the Confederate military judiciary. After the Civil War ended in 1865, Jackson returned to Memphis. Since he had served in the Confederate government, he had to secure a presidential pardon before he could continue the practice of law. Arguing that his role in the Confederate civil service was small, Jackson claimed in his petition that no formal sequestration orders had ever been issued under his tenure. Scholar Terry Calvani has contended these statements in Jackson's application "simply were not true", characterizing them as perjury. President Andrew Johnson initially rejected Jackson's petition, but he granted a second request in 1866.

Since Currin had died during the war, Jackson started a new legal practice with a former colleague. Their clients consisted mainly of banks and other business enterprises. The firm was successful, arguing numerous cases before the Memphis courts. Jackson's political sympathies had by this time moved toward the Democratic Party. A Redeemer, he was against Reconstruction-era policies and efforts toward racial equality. After his first wife died in 1873, he returned to the town of Jackson, where he started a law practice with General Alexander W. Campbell. Their firm litigated many cases involving property and criminal law. Jackson was well regarded as a lawyer: he sat as a judge on the local courts and served as a law professor at Southwestern Baptist University (now Union University).

== Service in state government ==
Jackson practiced law in Jackson until 1880. In 1875, however, he was appointed a judge of the temporary Court of Arbitration for Western Tennessee, which heard cases stemming from the large backlog created by the Civil War. When that court was dissolved, Jackson sought the Democratic nomination for a seat on the Tennessee Supreme Court, running against incumbent Thomas J. Freeman. At the convention, Jackson lost by a single vote; he refused the entreaties of his supporters to challenge the result. Jackson then became involved in what was then Tennessee's key political dispute: whether to pay back the state debt. Republicans generally supported its repayment, while Democrats were split between a state-credit faction, which was supportive of fulfilling the state's financial obligations, and a low-tax faction, which favored repudiating the debt. Jackson, who viewed repudiation to be immoral, was firmly on the state-credit side of this debate. After giving a speech on the debt, he was urged to run for a seat in the Tennessee House of Representatives. Jackson reluctantly agreed, and he was elected in 1880 to represent Madison County following a contentious campaign. After the legislature's session began in January 1881, he was appointed by Speaker Henry B. Ramsey to the finance, ways and means; judiciary; penitentiary; public grounds and buildings; incorporations; and privileges and elections committees. He was given the chairmanship of the committee on public grounds and buildings, but his prompt elevation to the U.S. Senate prevented him from making any substantial impact in that position.

The most urgent task before the legislature during Jackson's tenure was the election of a U.S. Senator. Incumbent Senator James E. Bailey's state-credit policies alienated the low-tax faction of the Democratic caucus, but Republican candidate Horace Maynard also failed to garner majority support. Jackson, who was considered capable of obtaining bipartisan support, refused to enter the race because he favored Bailey. A week of balloting failed to break the gridlock. Bailey then withdrew from consideration and urged Jackson to enter the race in his stead. On the thirtieth ballot, Republican R. R. Butler announced his support for Jackson, saying he had given up any hope that a Republican would be chosen. The Speaker of the House, a Maynard loyalist, followed suit, arguing that Jackson was the best choice among the Democrats. A number of Democratic legislators, many of whom were afraid that a Republican could be elected if they did not unite behind a candidate, backed Jackson as well. Convinced by Butler, other Republicans did the same, and Jackson was elected, receiving sixty-eight votes of the ninety-eight cast. He telegraphed his resignation from the state house, effective immediately, to Governor Alvin Hawkins on February 9, 1881. After a special election, he was succeeded later in the month by Hugh C. Anderson, who represented the district composed of Haywood, Hardeman, and Madison counties in the previous legislative session.

== Senate tenure ==
Jackson took his seat in the Senate on March 4, 1881. He was a member of four committees: the Post Office, Pensions, Claims, and Judiciary panels. Despite his loyalty to the Democratic platform, Republicans and Democrats alike held him in high regard. In the Senate, Jackson advocated for civil service reform and for the creation of the Interstate Commerce Commission. He supported further restrictions on Chinese immigration and argued for lower tariffs and higher infrastructure spending. Jackson's views on legal issues were influential among his colleagues: many important bills on the judiciary were referred to the subcommittee on which he sat. More important than his legislative accomplishments, however, were the personal relationships that he forged. Jackson became a friend of President Grover Cleveland, whose tariff policies he supported. He also established a friendly relationship with his colleague Benjamin Harrison, whom he was seated next to on the Senate floor. Jackson held a reputation for being a hard-working and committed legislator.

== Circuit judge ==
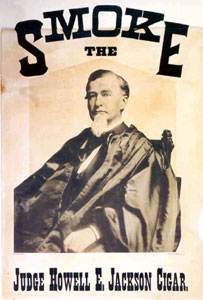
A cigar advertisement, c. 1892, portraying Jackson, then a circuit judge.

The 1886 death of Tennessee federal judge John Baxter created a vacancy for President Cleveland to fill on the circuit court for the Sixth Circuit. Cleveland asked his friend Jackson, who was still serving in the Senate, to recommend potential replacements, but the President ignored his advice and instead offered the seat to him. The senator attempted to decline, but Cleveland's insistence eventually led him to agree to be nominated. The Senate unanimously confirmed Jackson. During his seven-year tenure, he heard a variety of cases, a number of which pertained to patent issues. In 1889, Jackson urged his friend Harrison – who by then had become president – to appoint his judicial colleague Henry Billings Brown to the Supreme Court; although Harrison declined to appoint Brown that year, he elevated him to fill a subsequent vacancy the next year. Jackson's most noteworthy opinion on the circuit court was In re Greene (1892), the first case in which a federal court applied the Sherman Antitrust Act. The ruling in Greene rejected a Sherman Act indictment against whiskey producers on the basis that the defendants were not preventing other firms from entering the whiskey market. Jackson's narrow interpretation of the Act set the stage for later consequential antitrust cases, including United States v. E. C. Knight Co. (1895), and it continued to influence interstate commerce law for half a century.

In other cases, Jackson took a broader view of constitutional provisions. His 1893 ruling in United States v. Patrick interpreted the Civil Rights Act of 1870 expansively. The defendants in Patrick, who were residents of Tennessee, had been charged with killing several federal officers while they were searching for an illegal still. A lower federal court threw out the indictments, holding the officers were not exercising any legally protected civil right while they were carrying out their duties. Jackson rejected these arguments. In his view, federal officers have a constitutionally protected right "of accepting the public employment, and engaging in the administration of its functions". On that basis, Jackson concluded the prosecution under the Civil Rights Act could go forward since the officers' civil rights had been violated. Some Southerners denounced the ruling, objecting that it expanded the scope of an already loathed law. Jackson's decision also showed that his stances were sufficiently moderate to coalesce with the Republican agenda.

== Supreme Court nomination ==
On January 23, 1893, Supreme Court Justice Lucius Q. C. Lamar died. At this point, President Harrison was a lame duck: Grover Cleveland had won the 1892 presidential election and would take office in six weeks. Although Harrison wanted to appoint a fellow Republican to fill the vacancy, he recognized that the Democrat-controlled Senate would likely refuse to act on the nomination since it could simply wait for Cleveland to make a more favorable appointment. Not long after Lamar's death, Justice Brown, whom Jackson had recommended to Harrison a few years prior, paid a visit to the White House. Wishing to return the favor, the Republican Brown suggested that the Democratic Jackson would be an ideal candidate for Harrison to select. Jackson indeed checked all the boxes for Harrison: he was a conservative and well-regarded jurist and came from the South, as Lamar had. The two had also served in the Senate together and were close friends. Harrison agreed to nominate Jackson, doing so on February 2. The decision surprised both Republicans and Democrats, who expected Harrison to choose someone from his own party. Jackson's nomination was held up initially in committee, but senators unanimously confirmed their ex-colleague on February 18. Most had expected some objections on the floor, and a contemporaneous New York Times report noted that many were left "wondering...what became of the opposition". Professor Richard D. Friedman concludes their acquiescence was understandable: Democrats "could not very well vote against one of their own", while "Republicans, after initial disgruntlement, understood the logic of Harrison's move." Chief Justice Melville Fuller swore in Jackson on the morning of March 4, just hours before administering the presidential oath to Harrison's successor.

== Supreme Court service ==
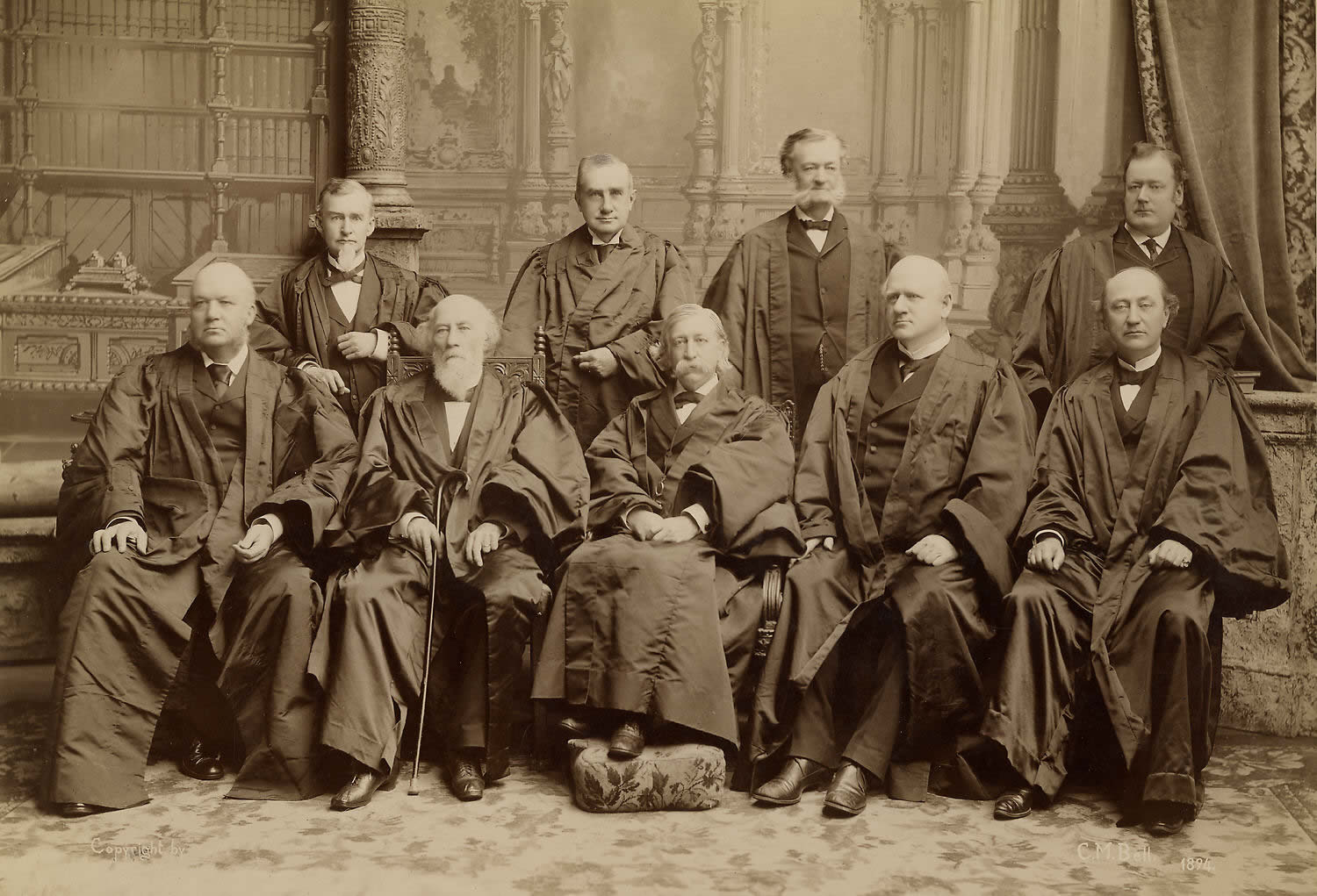
Group photograph of U.S. Supreme Court Justices, October 1894. Jackson is in the back row, first from the left.

Jackson's brief tenure on the Supreme Court lasted from March 4, 1893 until his death on August 8, 1895. He wrote only forty-six opinions. Because of his poor health and his lack of seniority, many of them were rendered in insignificant cases, especially patent disputes.

=== Pollock v. Farmers' Loan & Trust Co. ===
Scholar Irving Schiffman maintains that Jackson's name would have been "buried in [the] coffin of historical neglect" were it not for his participation in a single case: Pollock v. Farmers' Loan & Trust Co. Pollock involved a challenge to a provision of the 1894 Wilson–Gorman Tariff Act that had imposed a two percent personal income tax on all revenue over four thousand dollars. According to the plaintiff, the law imposed a direct tax without apportioning it among the states, in violation of a provision of the Constitution. In practice, it would be impossible to apportion such taxes among the states, so a ruling on that basis would doom all federal income taxation. Jackson was ill, but the eight remaining justices heard the case. They struck down certain other provisions of the act but split 4–4 on the constitutionality of the income tax. When Jackson suggested he could return to Washington, the Court agreed to rehear the case to make a more conclusive ruling on the income tax's legality.

Because the other eight justices had been evenly split, it was assumed that Jackson's vote would determine the case. Experts were uncertain how he would rule: his Southern background suggested he might support the tax, but his pro-business judicial views meant he might be inclined to strike it down. During the three days of arguments, lawyers aimed their contentions at the violently coughing Jackson, often ignoring other justices in their zeal to persuade the swing vote. But when the ruling finally came down on May 20, 1895, Jackson was in dissent. A five-justice majority led by Chief Justice Fuller ruled the tax to be unconstitutional, declaring it was an impermissible unapportioned direct tax. Jackson joined Brown and justices John Marshall Harlan and Edward Douglass White in dissenting from the Court's holding. In an impassioned opinion, he wrote "this decision is, in my judgment, the most disastrous blow ever struck at the constitutional power of Congress". Numerous coughing fits interrupted Jackson's ardent turns of phrase, stopping the seriously ill justice several times during his forty-five-minute delivery of the dissent.

Many have attempted to determine how Jackson ended up in the minority. The apparent reason is that one justice switched his vote. Newspapers at the time identified George Shiras as the "vacillating Justice"; biographer Willard King notes that "great obloquy was heaped on him" by outlets that opposed the Court's decision. While this suggestion continues to have its adherents, three sources denied Shiras's vote changed. Others have argued that Horace Gray or David J. Brewer changed their votes, but those proposals are difficult to reconcile with primary sources. The remaining possibility is that no justice changed his vote. According to this theory, five justices were averse to the tax from the beginning, but they were unable to unite behind one legal theory initially. Jackson's dissent eventually won vindication from the court of history: the Sixteenth Amendment passed eighteen years after Pollock revised the Constitution to authorize an income tax.

=== Other cases ===
History has taken little notice of most of Jackson's remaining opinions. He was assigned to write a number of opinions involving patent law, a field with which his circuit court tenure had given him experience. A disproportionate number of his rulings drew no dissents, suggesting they were mostly insignificant. His poor health and the fact that he was one of the newest justices for the entirety of his brief tenure likely contributed to this. Jackson's few cases display support for the proposition that the judiciary should defer to the legislature. His opinions in Schurz v. Cook (1893) and Columbus Southern Railway v. Wright (1894) rejected attempts by corporations to strike down various tax laws. Jackson's opinions also evidence both his support for broad federal power and his skepticism of states' decisions. In Mobile & Ohio R.R. v. Tennessee (1894), he favored a broad interpretation of the Contract Clause, ruling over four dissenting votes that Tennessee acted illegally in using its state constitution to renege on a promised tax exemption for a railroad company. In the 1893 case of Brass v. North Dakota, meanwhile, he exhibited support for the concept of substantive due process, joining a dissent by Justice Brewer that argued that a North Dakota regulation of grain elevators was an unconstitutional infringement upon the freedom of contract. Finally, he joined a five-justice majority in Fong Yue Ting v. United States (1893) to hold the federal government could deport Chinese immigrant laborers without providing them with due process protections.

=== Illness and death ===
Despite being apparently healthy at the time of his nomination, Jackson developed tuberculosis within a year of taking the bench. He returned quickly to his duties, but his illness worsened, and he had to leave the capital. In October 1894, he journeyed to the West hoping the climate would improve his condition. He traveled to Thomasville, Georgia, a few months later; his lung ailment started improving, but his health deteriorated substantially when he was afflicted with dropsy. Having no independent source of income, Jackson could not retire without a special act of Congress giving him a pension. Being too unwell to participate, he was unable to cast a vote in the consequential cases of United States v. E. C. Knight Co. and In re Debs. Jackson returned to his Tennessee home in February; his health began improving, and he expressed the hope that he would be able to return to his judicial duties by fall. His desire to participate in the income tax case led him to return to Washington in May, earlier than he had anticipated. The journey did substantial harm to Jackson's health, and Schiffman notes that his failure in Pollock "provided little incentive with which to uplift the spirit beyond the pains of the body". He died in Nashville just eleven weeks after the decision was rendered; his remains were buried in that city's Mount Olivet Cemetery. His tenure on the Supreme Court had lasted for less than two and a half years.

== Personal life ==
Jackson married Sophie Malloy, a Memphis banker's daughter, in 1859. They had six children (two of whom died during infancy) before her death in 1873. He then married Mary Harding, the daughter of influential Tennessee resident W. G. Harding, the following year. Jackson's brother William Hicks Jackson, who had been a brigadier general in the Confederate States Army during the Civil War, was married to another of Harding's daughters. When Harding died in 1886, the two Jackson brothers and their wives inherited the Belle Meade Plantation, where thoroughbred horses were raised. Howell's role was minimal, and he sold his stake in the horses to his brother in 1890. His thousand acres of property at West Meade (another part of Harding's estate) contained his home, which was considered among the finest in the state. Jackson had three children with his second wife, including William H. Jackson, who became a judge on the United States District Court for the Canal Zone. One of his descendants (also named Howell Jackson) is a professor and former acting dean at Harvard Law School.

He was a devout Christian, serving as an elder of the First Presbyterian Church of Nashville. His hobbies included hunting foxes and watching horse races.

== Legacy ==
Jackson's impact on history was minimal, due in no small part to the brevity of his Supreme Court tenure. A 1972 survey of legal scholars found Jackson was considered a "below average" justice, although the respondents declined to classify him as a "failure". His participation in Pollock, however, prevented him from being entirely covered with what Schiffman called the "shroud of anonymity". Pollock was among the leading cases of the era, and his vote aligned with later public sentiment. While Jackson was well regarded by his contemporaries, Timothy L. Hall writes that he "would probably never have been a great Supreme Court justice"; according to Hall, the "plodding and pedestrian" Jackson "was capable of solid work but not of judicial brilliance". Scholar Roger D. Hardaway, while conceding that the justice "is not a giant" in the annals of the Supreme Court, argues that Jackson's accomplished if brief work deserves a prominent place in Tennessee history. The Liberty ship SS Howell E. Jackson was named in his honor.

== See also ==
- List of justices of the Supreme Court of the United States

Tennessee House of Representatives
Preceded by Benjamin Tyson	Member of the Tennessee House of Representatives from Madison County; 1881	Succeeded by Hugh C. Anderson
U.S. Senate
Preceded by James E. Bailey	U.S. senator (Class 1) from Tennessee; 1881–1886; Served alongside: Isham G. Harris	Succeeded by Washington C. Whitthorne
Legal offices
Preceded by John Baxter	Judge of the United States Circuit Courts for the Sixth Circuit; 1886–1893	Succeeded by Horace Harmon Lurton
Preceded by Seat established by 26 Stat. 826	Judge of the United States Court of Appeals for the Sixth Circuit; 1891–1893	Succeeded by Horace Harmon Lurton
Preceded by Lucius Quintus Cincinnatus Lamar II	Associate Justice of the Supreme Court of the United States; 1893–1895	Succeeded by Rufus W. Peckham
