= Francis Ikome =

Italian-Cameroonian footballer

Francis Ikome (born 4 March 1982) is an Italian-Cameroonian international policy adviser and the founder and president of the Cameroonian American Chamber of Commerce (CAMAM). He is also a retired professional footballer.

== Personal life and career ==
Ikome was born in Assisi, Italy, and raised between his hometown and Limbe, Cameroon. He played as a forward for the Portuguese Liga de Honra team S.C. Beira-Mar. He made his professional debut in March 2006.

After retiring from professional sport, Ikome founded the Cameroonian American Chamber of Commerce (CAMAM) in Washington, D.C. in 2013 to increase diaspora engagement in private sector development in Cameroon and to help facilitate U.S.-Cameroonian economic relations. He is a leading advocate for stronger U.S. economic engagement on the African continent, and has called for boosting U.S.-Cameroonian bilateral trade and forging public-private partnerships to address Africa's capacity-building needs.

Ikome holds a master's degree in international relations and international economics from the Paul H. Nitze School of Advanced International Studies at Johns Hopkins University and a bachelor's degree in business administration from Cumberland University.

He is also a managing partner of the Africa Investment Agency and columnist with China Daily Africa.
