= J. F. Henley =

Arkansas politician

Jackson F. Henley (born January 2, 1870) was an American lawyer, state legislator and judge in Arkansas. He was an outspoken opponent of a separate coach bill for segregated passenger services. He also opposed Democrat proposed election bills as they sought to regain control and exclude African Americans from voting.

He was born in St. Joe, Arkansas. He studied law at Cumberland University.

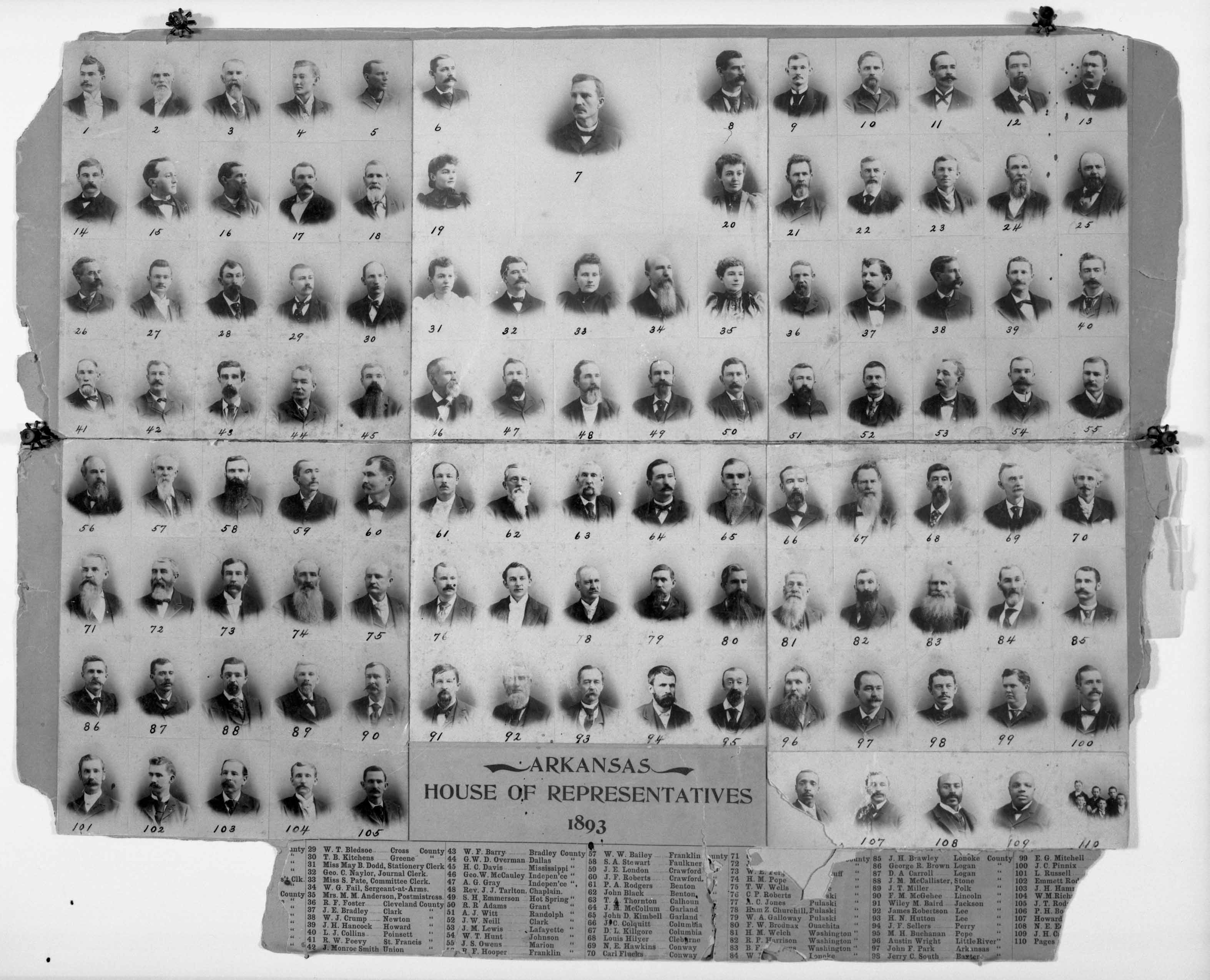
Composite photo of 1893 Arkansas House of Representatives members and officers

Henley, a "mountain Republican", represented Searcy County in the Arkansas House of Representatives in 1891 and 1893. He was succeeded by Ulysses S. Bratton.

In 1898, Henley was a candidate for Attorney General of Searcy County. He had a law practice in Marshall, Arkansas. He was an incorporator of The Farmers Bank and a donor of money for construction of Marshall's train depot.
