= Brandon Ogles =

American politician (born 1976)

Member of the Tennessee House of Representatives from the 61st district
- In office January 8, 2019 – January 10, 2023
- Preceded by: Charles Sargent
- Succeeded by: Gino Bulso

Personal details
- Born: Brandon Thomas Ogles; August 8, 1976 (age 49) Nashville, Tennessee, U.S.
- Party: Republican
- Spouse: Grace Ogles
- Children: 4
- Relatives: Andy Ogles (cousin)
- Education: Carson-Newman University; Lipscomb University (BS)

Brandon Thomas Ogles (born August 8, 1976) is an American former politician who served in the Tennessee House of Representatives. As a Republican, he represented District 61, located in northern Williamson County, and includes the city of Brentwood and part of Franklin.

Ogles first announced his candidacy on November 8, 2017, after then-incumbent Charles Sargent chose not to run for reelection. After election as the state representative for Tennessee's House District 61 in 2018, Ogles served as vice-caucuses chair, the first time that a freshman legislator was elected to leadership in the House of Representatives in Tennessee.

He served on the Judiciary Committee, Criminal Justice Subcommittee, Finance, Ways & Means Committee, Ways & Means Subcommittee, and the Joint Pensions and Insurance Committee. He was the majority caucus vice chairman.

He served his first term in Tennessee's 111th General Assembly (2018–2020) and was re-elected to the 112th General Assembly (2020–2022).

On February 17, 2024, three days following Representative Mark Green's initial announcement that he would retire, Ogles announced that he would be running as candidate for the United States House of Representatives in Tennessee's 7th Congressional District. On March 5, Ogles withdrew from the race after Green reversed his decision on February 29.

== Biography ==
=== Early life and career ===
Ogles moved to the Williamson County area when he was eight years old with deep family roots in Tennessee dating back to the state's founding. Both his father and grandfather were police officers.

After graduating from Franklin High School in his hometown in 1995, Ogles attended Lipscomb University in 1995 and graduated in 1999 with a Bachelor of Science in management with a double minor in finance and psychology. In college, Ogles was a member of the Financial Management Association National Honor Society, a program known for its members' significant contributions to the finance profession as distinguished scholars. While in college, Ogles also sat for and passed the Tennessee Real Estate exam, becoming a licensed real estate agent.

As an Eagle Scout, Ogles mentored a close friend who suffered traumatic abuse while scouting and ultimately took his own life. The event greatly impacted Ogles and motivated him to draft and pass legislation focused on sexual abuse and enact harsher penalties for those who harm children.

Ogles started his family business in 2006, with his father Neal Ogles, and is the co-owner of Branch Building Group. He is a former reserve officer in Williamson County and a real estate investor.

== Legislation ==
During his time serving as Tennessee State representative, Ogles achieved several legislative objectives that focused on enhancing school safety and reforming criminal justice. One of his most noteworthy achievements was the successful passing of HB1158, the Secure of Tennessee Schools Act of 2018. This legislation permits local education agencies (LEAs) to establish a threat assessment team, which develops holistic, intervention-focused methods to prevent violence, manage potential threat reports, and implement a system that cultivates a secure, supportive, and effective educational environment. HB1158 received unanimous approval in both the House and Senate before being signed into law by Governor Lee on May 10, 2019.

=== School safety ===
- HB2761, a bill requiring firearm safety training in Tennessee schools. This bill mandates safety training for children to identify a firearm, never touch a firearm, and notify an adult of the presence of a firearm in Tennessee schools. It was the first bill of its kind, supported by the Tennessee Firearm Association and passed the House unanimously.

Ogles has made significant legislative achievements to increase security in Tennessee schools, including, but not limited to:

- HB1158: Secure of Tennessee Schools 2018 authorizes LEAs to establish a threat assessment team to develop comprehensive, intervention-based approaches to prevent violence, manage reports of potential threats, and create a system that fosters a safe, supportive, and effective school environment. Passed House and Senate unanimously, signed by Governor Lee May 10, 2019 – Public Chapter 394
- HB2730: Crime on College Campuses This legislation was created to address the issue of sexual assault cover-ups and underreporting on Tennessee's college campuses. Representative Ogles observed that many universities in Tennessee were not providing accurate or complete information as required by federal law under the Clery Act. The bill changed various Tennessee state laws, as outlined in TCA Titles 4, 7, 8, 9, 33, 38, 39, 40, 43, 49, 62, and 68. The bill passed through the Senate without opposition and was signed into law by Governor Lee on April 29, 2022, under Public Chapter 958.

=== Civil rights ===
- HB0037: Essential Workers Act No Executive or Governmental entity shall create categories or classes of essential and nonessential businesses, trades, professions, or industries for the purpose of authorizing such categories or classes to remain in operation or requiring the same to cease operation for any purpose if the business, trade, profession, or industry is otherwise lawful in this state. Signed by Governor Lee May 11, 2021 – Public Chapter 384

=== Criminal justice ===
His bill HB2271 or "The Dirty Dozen", broadens the scope of criminal asset forfeiture to include twelve kidnapping and sexual assault offenses in Tennessee. This legislation is the first of its kind in the United States, as it expands asset forfeiture to target rapists and child molesters in the same way as high-level drug traffickers. HB2271 enables district attorneys and prosecutors to seize all assets connected to the crime. The bill amends various Tennessee state laws, including TCA Titles 8, 16, 17, 19, 20, 29, 39, and 40. It received unanimous support in both the House and Senate and was signed into law by Governor Lee on May 3, 2022, under Public Chapter 982.

- HB0039: Rape Kit Submission Time Requires local law enforcement agencies to submit a sexual assault evidence collection kit to the state crime lab or other similar qualified laboratories for testing within 30 days of a victim filing a police report rather than 60 days. The bill cuts the required submission time in half to speed up processing. Passed House unanimously, rolled into Jim Coley Protection for Rape Survivors Act HB0039. Signed by Governor Lee May 11, 2021 - Public Chapter
- HB2269: Capital Murder law mandates that anyone found guilty of first-degree murder while committing or attempting to commit aggravated rape, rape, rape of a child, or aggravated rape of a child must receive a sentence of either life imprisonment without the possibility of parole or the death penalty. - Amends TCA Title 39 and Title 40 Passed House and Senate unanimously, signed by Governor Lee March 18, 2022 – Public Chapter 718
- HB2244: Rewrites the bill and creates the criminal offenses of especially aggravated rape, especially aggravated rape of a child, and grave torture. Punishments for such crimes will lead to life imprisonment without parole and even the death penalty. HB2244 has been widely seen as the most aggressive sexual assault legislation in the United States since 2004. Giving "Grave torture" as the first statute of its kind that could challenge the supreme court case of Kennedy vs. Louisiana, which stripped the states of the ability to punish rape and torture with the death penalty. This statute amends TCA Title 5; Title 6; Title 7; Title 8; Title 12; Title 38; Title 39; Title 40, and Title 49. Passed unanimously in the House. Signed by Governor Lee May 5, 2022 – Public Chapter 1062
- HB50: 2020 Defense Doctrine Adds imminent danger of grave sexual abuse as a justification for the use of deadly force in self-defense and to defenses of duress and use of deadly force by law enforcement officer; defines grave sexual abuse as rape, aggravated rape, rape of a child, or aggravated rape of a child. Passed House and Senate unanimously, signed by Governor Lee April 7, 2021 – Public Chapter 83
- HB1338: Violent Home Invasion Changes the classification of offense for aggravated burglary and especially aggravated burglary, from a crime against a property to a crime against a person. A crime against a person is any violent offense that results or could have resulted in physical injury to the victim. Includes rape, sexual battery, kidnapping, aggravated burglary and especially aggravated burglary. Signed by Governor Lee May 25, 2021 - Public Chapter 545

=== Healthcare ===
- HB1344: TACIR Study on Childhood Health asks the Tennessee Advisory Commission on Intergovernmental Relations (TACIR) to comprehensively evaluate the socioeconomic impact of childhood obesity in Tennessee and its short- and long-term effects. Passed House and Senate unanimously, signed by Governor Lee May 25, 25021 – Public Chapter 503

=== Abortion ===
Ogles co-sponsored several pieces of pro-life legislation during his tenure in the house, all of which limited abortion in Tennessee.

- HB1029: Enacts the "Human Life Protection Act," which bans abortion effective on the 30th day after the U.S. Supreme Court overturns Roe v. Wade or an amendment to the U.S. Constitution to allow states to prohibit abortion; creates exception for situations where the abortion is necessary to prevent the death of pregnant woman or prevent serious risk of substantial and irreversible impairment of major bodily function; prohibits prosecution of a woman upon whom an abortion is performed or attempted.
- HB0077: Prohibits abortions from the point a fetal heartbeat is detected; creates exceptions.
- HB2263: Creates the Class C felony of performing or inducing, or attempting to perform or induce, an abortion upon a pregnant woman whose unborn child has a fetal heartbeat; creates other criminal offenses related to the performance of an abortion; requires that certain information regarding reversing chemical abortions be provided; revises and enacts other abortion-related provisions.

== Personal life ==
Ogles is a Southern Baptist and lives with his wife Grace in Franklin, Tennessee.They have four children together. He is a cousin of United States Representative Andy Ogles of Tennessee's 5th congressional district.

== Electoral history ==
Republican primary results, 2018
Party	Candidate	Votes	%
Republican	Brandon Ogles	3,913	35.46%
Republican	Gino Bulso	2,685	24.32%
Republican	Jeff Ford	1,876	17.00%
Republican	Rebecca Ann Burke	1,604	14.54%
Republican	Robert Hullett	709	6.42%
Republican	Terrence A. Smith	250	2.26%
Total votes		11,037	100.00%

Tennessee House of Representatives District 61 General Election, 2018
Party	Candidate	Votes	%
Republican	Brandon Ogles	21,885	65.44%
Democratic	Rebecca Purington	11,555	34.56%
Total votes		33,440	100.00%
Republican hold			

Republican primary results, 2020
Party	Candidate	Votes	%
Republican	Brandon Ogles (incumbent)	8,180	100.00%
Total votes		8,180	100.00%

Tennessee House of Representatives District 61 General Election, 2020
Party	Candidate	Votes	%
Republican	Brandon Ogles (incumbent)	27,440	65.93%
Democratic	Sam Bledsoe	14,178	34.07%
Total votes		41,618	100.00%
Republican hold			
