= Jesse Huseth =

American politician

Member-elect of the Tennessee House of Representatives from the 97th district
- Assuming office January 14, 2027
- Succeeding: John Gillespie

Personal details
- Party: Democratic

Jesse Huseth is an American politician and former teacher. A Democrat, he is a member-elect of the Tennessee House of Representatives from the 97th district.

== Career ==
Outside of politics, Huseth is a business owner and formerly worked as a teacher.

Huseth ran for the Tennessee House in 2024, but lost to Republican incumbent John Gillespie by 3.5%, or approximately 1,100 votes. Huseth ran again in 2026, this time defeating Gillespie and winning election by 14.0%, or approximately 3,300 votes.
