= Charles Sargent =

Charles Sargent may refer to:

- Charles Sprague Sargent, American botanist
- Charles Sargent (politician) (1943–2018), American politician
- Charles Sargent (judge), British Indian Judge
