= List of United States representatives who lost re-election in a primary =

Elections for the United States House of Representatives are preceded by primary elections. Incumbent representatives often win renomination, although there are some instances of incumbents who lose to a primary challenge. In cases of redistricting, incumbents may run against each other in the same district.

== 1962 ==
Member	Party	District	First elected	Challenger	Notes
H. Carl Andersen	Republican	Minnesota 7th	1938	Robert J. Odegard	Redistricted to the 6th district; challenger lost general election
Frank W. Boykin	Democratic	Alabama 1st	1935	Constituency abolished	Full delegation redistricted to the at-large district; lost to fellow incumbents
James C. Davis	Democratic	Georgia 5th	1946	Charles L. Weltner	
Edwin B. Dooley	Republican	New York 26th	1956	Ogden Reid	
James B. Frazier Jr.	Democratic	Tennessee 3rd	1948	Wilkes Thrasher Jr.	Challenger lost general election
Peter A. Garland	Republican	Maine 1st	1960	Stanley R. Tupper	Lost to fellow incumbent
Carroll D. Kearns	Republican	Pennsylvania 24th	1946	James D. Weaver	
Harold B. McSween	Democratic	Louisiana 8th	1958	Gillis William Long	
Walter L. McVey Jr.	Republican	Kansas 3rd	1960	Joe Skubitz	Redistricted to the 5th district
Frank Ellis Smith	Democratic	Mississippi 3rd	1950	Jamie Whitten	Redistricted to the 2nd district; lost to fellow incumbent
Phil Weaver	Republican	Nebraska 1st	1954	Ralph F. Beermann	Lost to fellow incumbent
Herbert Zelenko	Democratic	New York 21st	1954	William Fitts Ryan	Redistricted to the 20th district; lost to fellow incumbent

== 1964 ==
Member	Party	District	First elected	Challenger	Notes
Charles A. Buckley	Democratic	New York 23rd	1934	Jonathan B. Bingham	
Clifford Davis	Democratic	Tennessee 9th	1940	George W. Grider	
Carl Elliott	Democratic	Alabama 7th	1948	George C. Hawkins	Challenger lost general election
James C. Healey	Democratic	New York 21st	1956	James H. Scheuer	
John Lesinski Jr.	Democratic	Michigan 16th	1950	John Dingell	Lost to fellow incumbent
Gillis William Long	Democratic	Louisiana 8th	1962	Speedy Long	
Harold M. Ryan	Democratic	Michigan 14th	1962	Lucien Nedzi	Lost to fellow incumbent
Victor Wickersham	Democratic	Oklahoma 6th	1960	Jed Johnson Jr.	

== 1966 ==
Member	Party	District	First elected	Challenger	Notes
Lindley Beckworth	Democratic	Texas 3rd	1956	Ray Roberts	Redistricted to the 4th district; lost to fellow incumbent
Ralph Harvey	Republican	Indiana 10th	1960	Richard L. Roudebush	Lost to fellow incumbent
Joseph W. Martin Jr.	Republican	Massachusetts 10th	1924	Margaret Heckler	
D. R. Matthews	Democratic	Florida 8th	1952	Don Fuqua	Redistricted to the 2nd district; lost to fellow incumbent
James H. Morrison	Democratic	Louisiana 6th	1942	John Rarick	
Tom J. Murray	Democratic	Tennessee 7th	1942	Ray Blanton	
Howard W. Smith	Democratic	Virginia 8th	1930	George Rawlings	Challenger lost general election
J. Russell Tuten	Democratic	Georgia 8th	1962	W. S. Stuckey Jr.	

== 1968 ==
Member	Party	District	First elected	Challenger	Notes
William Henry Harrison III	Republican	Wyoming at-large	1966	John S. Wold	
Barratt O'Hara	Democratic	Illinois 2nd	1952	Abner Mikva	
Edwin E. Willis	Democratic	Louisiana 3rd	1948	Patrick T. Caffery	

== 1970 ==
Member	Party	District	First elected	Challenger	Notes
Jeffery Cohelan	Democratic	California 7th	1958	Ron Dellums	
Glenn Cunningham	Republican	Nebraska 2nd	1956	John Y. McCollister	
George Hyde Fallon	Democratic	Maryland 4th	1944	Paul Sarbanes	
Leonard Farbstein	Democratic	New York 19th	1956	Bella Abzug	
Michael A. Feighan	Democratic	Ohio 20th	1942	James V. Stanton	
Samuel Friedel	Democratic	Maryland 7th	1952	Parren Mitchell	
Jacob H. Gilbert	Democratic	New York 22nd	1960	James H. Scheuer	Lost to fellow incumbent
Philip J. Philbin	Democratic	Massachusetts 3rd	1942	Robert Drinan	Ran as an independent in the general election and lost
Adam Clayton Powell Jr.	Democratic	New York 18th	1944	Charles Rangel	
Byron G. Rogers	Democratic	Colorado 1st	1950	Craig S. Barnes	Challenger lost general election

== 1972 ==
Member	Party	District	First elected	Challenger	Notes
Wayne N. Aspinall	Democratic	Colorado 4th	1948	Alan Merson	Challenger lost general election
Walter S. Baring Jr.	Democratic	Nevada at-large	1956	James Bilbray	Challenger lost general election
James A. Byrne	Democratic	Pennsylvania 3rd	1952	William J. Green III	Lost to fellow incumbent
Emanuel Celler	Democratic	New York 10th	1922	Elizabeth Holtzman	Redistricted to the 16th district; lost general election under new party
William Sheldrick Conover	Republican	Pennsylvania 27th	1972	James R. Montgomery	Redistricted to the 22nd district; challenger lost general election
Cornelius Gallagher	Democratic	New Jersey 13th	1958	Dominick V. Daniels	Redistricted to the 14th district; lost to fellow incumbent
George Elliott Hagan	Democratic	Georgia 1st	1960	Bo Ginn	
James Kee	Democratic	West Virginia 5th	1964	Ken Hechler	Redistricted to the 4th district; lost to fellow incumbent
Jack H. McDonald	Republican	Michigan 19th	1966	William Broomfield	Lost to fellow incumbent
John L. McMillan	Democratic	South Carolina 6th	1938	John Jenrette	Challenger lost general election
George P. Miller	Democratic	California 8th	1944	Pete Stark	
James H. Scheuer	Democratic	New York 22nd	1964	Jonathan B. Bingham	Lost to fellow incumbent
John G. Schmitz	Republican	California 35th	1970	Andrew J. Hinshaw	Redistricted to the 39th district

== 1974 ==
Member	Party	District	First elected	Challenger	Notes
Glenn Robert Davis	Republican	Wisconsin 9th	1964	Bob Kasten	
John William Davis	Democratic	Georgia 7th	1960	Larry McDonald	
Orval H. Hansen	Republican	Idaho 2nd	1968	George V. Hansen	
John Rarick	Democratic	Louisiana 6th	1966	Jeff La Caze	Challenger lost general election
Bertram L. Podell	Democratic	New York 13th	1968	Stephen Solarz	
Frank Stubblefield	Democratic	Kentucky 1st	1958	Carroll Hubbard	
Robert Tiernan	Democratic	Rhode Island 2nd	1967	Edward Beard	
Lawrence G. Williams	Republican	Pennsylvania 7th	1966	Stephen J. McEwen Jr.	Challenger lost general election

== 1976 ==
Member	Party	District	First elected	Challenger
Andrew J. Hinshaw	Republican	California 40th	1972	Robert Badham
Ray Madden	Democratic	Indiana 1st	1942	Adam Benjamin Jr.
Otto Passman	Democratic	Louisiana 5th	1946	Jerry Huckaby

== 1978 ==
Member	Party	District	First elected	Challenger	Notes
John B. Breckinridge	Democratic	Kentucky 6th	1972	Charles T. Easterly	Challenger lost general election
Dale Milford	Democratic	Texas 24th	1972	Martin Frost	
Robert N. C. Nix Sr.	Democratic	Pennsylvania 2nd	1958	William H. Gray III	
Ted Risenhoover	Democratic	Oklahoma 2nd	1974	Mike Synar	
John Andrew Young	Democratic	Texas 14th	1956	Joseph P. Wyatt Jr.	

== 1980 ==
Member	Party	District	First elected	Challenger	Notes
John Hall Buchanan Jr.	Republican	Alabama 6th	1964	Albert L. Smith Jr.	
Robert B. Duncan	Democratic	Oregon 3rd	1974	Ron Wyden	
Richard Kelly	Republican	Florida 5th	1974	Bill McCollum	
Edward J. Stack	Democratic	Florida 12th	1978	Alan S. Becker	Challenger lost general election
Bennett Stewart	Democratic	Illinois 1st	1978	Harold Washington	
Charles H. Wilson	Democratic	California 31st	1962	Mervyn Dymally	

== 1982 ==
Member	Party	District	First elected	Challenger	Notes
Ed Derwinski	Republican	Illinois 4th	1958	George M. O'Brien	Lost to fellow incumbent
Billy Lee Evans	Democratic	Georgia 8th	1976	J. Roy Rowland	
David W. Evans	Democratic	Indiana 6th	1974	Andrew Jacobs Jr.	Redistricted to the 11th district; lost to fellow incumbent
John G. Fary	Democratic	Illinois 5th	1975	Bill Lipinski	
Wayne R. Grisham	Republican	California 33rd	1978	David Dreier	Lost to fellow incumbent
Gary A. Lee	Republican	New York 33rd	1978	George C. Wortley	Redistricted to the 27th district; lost to fellow incumbent
Ronald M. Mottl	Democratic	Ohio 23rd	1974	Ed Feighan	Redistricted to the 19th district
Tom Railsback	Republican	Illinois 19th	1966	Kenneth G. McMillan	Redistricted to the 17th district; challenger lost general election
Joseph F. Smith	Democratic	Pennsylvania 3rd	1981	Thomas M. Foglietta	Redistricted to the 1st district; lost to fellow incumbent

== 1984 ==
Member	Party	District	First elected	Challenger
Katie Hall	Democratic	Indiana 1st	1982	Pete Visclosky
Frank Harrison	Democratic	Pennsylvania 11th	1982	Paul Kanjorski
Abraham Kazen	Democratic	Texas 23rd	1966	Albert Bustamante

== 1986 ==
Member	Party	District	First elected	Challenger	Notes
Neil Abercrombie	Democratic	Hawaii 1st	1986	Mufi Hannemann	Challenger lost general election
Mark D. Siljander	Republican	Michigan 4th	1981	Fred Upton	
Alton Waldon	Democratic	New York 6th	1986	Floyd Flake	

== 1988 ==
Member	Party	District	First elected	Challenger
Ernie Konnyu	Republican	California 12th	1986	Tom Campbell

== 1990 ==
Member	Party	District	First elected	Challenger	Notes
Buz Lukens	Republican	Ohio 8th	1986	John Boehner	Resigned

== 1992 ==
Member	Party	District	First elected	Challenger	Notes
Bill Alexander	Democratic	Arkansas 1st	1968	Blanche Lincoln	
Beryl Anthony Jr.	Democratic	Arkansas 4th	1978	Bill McCuen	Challenger lost general election
Chester G. Atkins	Democratic	Massachusetts 5th	1984	Marty Meehan	
Terry L. Bruce	Democratic	Illinois 19th	1984	Glenn Poshard	
Beverly Byron	Democratic	Maryland 6th	1978	Thomas Hattery	Challenger lost general election
Mickey Edwards	Republican	Oklahoma 5th	1976	Ernest Istook	
Charles Floyd Hatcher	Democratic	Georgia 2nd	1980	Sanford Bishop	
Charles Hayes	Democratic	Illinois 1st	1983	Bobby Rush	
Carroll Hubbard	Democratic	Kentucky 1st	1974	Thomas Barlow	
Ben Jones	Democratic	Georgia 4th	1988	Don Johnson Jr.	Redistricted to the 10th district
Joseph P. Kolter	Democratic	Pennsylvania 4th	1982	Ron Klink	
Robert Lagomarsino	Republican	California 19th	1974	Michael Huffington	Redistricted to the 22nd district
Clarence E. Miller	Republican	Ohio 10th	1966	Bob McEwen	Redistricted to the 6th district; lost to fellow incumbent; challenger lost general election
Dick Nichols	Republican	Kansas 5th	1990	Eric Yost	Redistricted to the 4th district; challenger lost general election
Marty Russo	Democratic	Illinois 3rd	1974	Bill Lipinski	Lost to fellow incumbent
Gus Savage	Democratic	Illinois 2nd	1980	Mel Reynolds	
Stephen Solarz	Democratic	New York 13th	1974	Nydia Velázquez	Redistricted to the 12th district
Harley O. Staggers Jr.	Democratic	West Virginia 2nd	1982	Alan Mollohan	Redistricted to the 1st district; lost to fellow incumbent
Guy Vander Jagt	Republican	Michigan 9th	1966	Pete Hoekstra	Redistricted to the 2nd district

== 1994 ==
Member	Party	District	First elected	Challenger	Notes
Lucien Blackwell	Democratic	Pennsylvania 2nd	1991	Chaka Fattah	
David A. Levy	Republican	New York 4th	1992	Dan Frisa	
Mike Synar	Democratic	Oklahoma 2nd	1978	Virgil Cooper	Challenger lost general election
Craig Washington	Democratic	Texas 18th	1989	Sheila Jackson Lee	

== 1996 ==
Member	Party	District	First elected	Challenger
Barbara-Rose Collins	Democratic	Michigan 15th	1990	Carolyn Cheeks Kilpatrick
Greg Laughlin	Republican	Texas 14th	1988	Ron Paul

== 1998 ==
Member	Party	District	First elected	Challenger
Jay Kim	Republican	California 41st	1992	Gary Miller

== 2000 ==
Member	Party	District	First elected	Challenger	Notes
Merrill Cook	Republican	Utah 2nd	1996	Derek Smith	Challenger lost general election
Michael Forbes	Democratic	New York 1st	1994	Regina Seltzer	Elected as a Republican in 1998; ran as independent in the general election and lost; challenger lost general election
Matthew G. Martínez	Democratic	California 31st	1982	Hilda Solis	Later defected to the Republican Party

== 2002 ==
Member	Party	District	First elected	Challenger	Notes
Bob Barr	Republican	Georgia 7th	1994	John Linder	Lost to fellow incumbent
Gary Condit	Democratic	California 18th	1989	Dennis Cardoza	
Earl Hilliard	Democratic	Alabama 7th	1992	Artur Davis	
Brian Kerns	Republican	Indiana 7th	2000	Steve Buyer	Redistricted to the 4th district; lost to fellow incumbent
Frank Mascara	Democratic	Pennsylvania 20th	1994	John Murtha	Redistricted to the 12th district; lost to fellow incumbent
Cynthia McKinney	Democratic	Georgia 4th	1992	Denise Majette	
Lynn Rivers	Democratic	Michigan 13th	1994	John Dingell	Redistricted to the 15th district; lost to fellow incumbent
Tom Sawyer	Democratic	Ohio 14th	1986	Tim Ryan	Redistricted to the 17th district

== 2004 ==
Member	Party	District	First elected	Challenger	Notes
Chris Bell	Democratic	Texas 25th	2002	Al Green	Redistricted to the 9th district
Ciro Rodriguez	Democratic	Texas 28th	1997	Henry Cuellar	

== 2006 ==
Member	Party	District	First elected	Challenger	Notes
Cynthia McKinney	Democratic	Georgia 4th	2004	Hank Johnson	
Joe Schwarz	Republican	Michigan 7th	2004	Tim Walberg	Lost general election as a write-in

== 2008 ==
Member	Party	District	First elected	Challenger	Notes
Chris Cannon	Republican	Utah 3rd	1996	Jason Chaffetz	
David Davis	Republican	Tennessee 1st	2006	Phil Roe	
Wayne Gilchrest	Republican	Maryland 1st	1990	Andy Harris	Challenger lost general election
Albert Wynn	Democratic	Maryland 4th	1992	Donna Edwards	Resigned; challenger elected to finish term

== 2010 ==
Member	Party	District	First elected	Challenger	Notes
Parker Griffith	Republican	Alabama 5th	2008	Mo Brooks	Elected as a Democrat and switched parties in 2009
Bob Inglis	Republican	South Carolina 4th	2004	Trey Gowdy	
Carolyn Cheeks Kilpatrick	Democratic	Michigan 13th	1996	Hansen Clarke	
Alan Mollohan	Democratic	West Virginia 1st	1982	Mike Oliverio	Challenger lost general election

== 2012 ==
Member	Party	District	First elected	Challenger	Notes
Sandy Adams	Republican	Florida 24th	2010	John Mica	Redistricted to the 7th district; lost to fellow incumbent
Jason Altmire	Democratic	Pennsylvania 4th	2006	Mark Critz	Redistricted to the 12th district; lost to fellow incumbent; challenger lost general election
Russ Carnahan	Democratic	Missouri 3rd	2004	Lacy Clay	Redistricted to the 1st district; lost to fellow incumbent
Hansen Clarke	Democratic	Michigan 13th	2010	Gary Peters	Redistricted to the 14th district; lost to fellow incumbent
Tim Holden	Democratic	Pennsylvania 17th	1992	Matt Cartwright	
Dennis Kucinich	Democratic	Ohio 10th	1996	Marcy Kaptur	Redistricted to the 9th district; lost to fellow incumbent
Don Manzullo	Republican	Illinois 16th	1992	Adam Kinzinger	Lost to fellow incumbent
Ben Quayle	Republican	Arizona 3rd	2010	David Schweikert	Redistricted to the 6th district; lost to fellow incumbent
Silvestre Reyes	Democratic	Texas 16th	1996	Beto O'Rourke	
Steve Rothman	Democratic	New Jersey 9th	1996	Bill Pascrell	Lost to fellow incumbent
Jean Schmidt	Republican	Ohio 2nd	2005	Brad Wenstrup	
Cliff Stearns	Republican	Florida 6th	1988	Ted Yoho	Redistricted to the 3rd district
John Sullivan	Republican	Oklahoma 1st	2002	Jim Bridenstine	

== 2014 ==
Member	Party	District	First elected	Challenger	Notes
Kerry Bentivolio	Republican	Michigan 11th	2012	Dave Trott	
Eric Cantor	Republican	Virginia 7th	2000	Dave Brat	Only sitting Majority Leader to have ever lost a primary. Resigned; challenger elected to finish term
Ralph Hall	Republican	Texas 4th	1980	John Ratcliffe	
Vance McAllister	Republican	Louisiana 5th	2013	Ralph Abraham	Lost in blanket primary
John F. Tierney	Democratic	Massachusetts 6th	1996	Seth Moulton	

== 2016 ==
Member	Party	District	First elected	Challenger	Notes
Corrine Brown	Democratic	Florida 5th	1992	Al Lawson	
Renee Ellmers	Republican	North Carolina 2nd	2010	George Holding	Lost to fellow incumbent
Chaka Fattah	Democratic	Pennsylvania 2nd	1994	Dwight Evans	Resigned; challenger elected to finish term
Randy Forbes	Republican	Virginia 4th	2001	Scott Taylor	Redistricted to the 2nd district
Tim Huelskamp	Republican	Kansas 1st	2010	Roger Marshall	

== 2018 ==
Member	Party	District	First elected	Challenger	Notes	Ref
Madeleine Bordallo	Democratic	Guam at-large	2002	Michael San Nicolas		
Mike Capuano	Democratic	Massachusetts 7th	1998	Ayanna Pressley		
Joe Crowley	Democratic	New York 14th	1998	Alexandria Ocasio-Cortez	Lost general election under new party	
Robert Pittenger	Republican	North Carolina 9th	2012	Mark Harris	General election voided	
Mark Sanford	Republican	South Carolina 1st	2013	Katie Arrington	Challenger lost general election	

== 2020 ==
Member	Party	District	First elected	Challenger	Notes	Ref
Lacy Clay	Democratic	Missouri 1st	2000	Cori Bush		
Eliot Engel	Democratic	New York 16th	1988	Jamaal Bowman		
Steve King	Republican	Iowa 4th	2002	Randy Feenstra		
Dan Lipinski	Democratic	Illinois 3rd	2004	Marie Newman		
Denver Riggleman	Republican	Virginia 5th	2018	Bob Good	Lost in party convention	
Ross Spano	Republican	Florida 15th	2018	Scott Franklin		
Scott Tipton	Republican	Colorado 3rd	2010	Lauren Boebert		
Steve Watkins	Republican	Kansas 2nd	2018	Jake LaTurner		

== 2022 ==
Member	Party	District	First elected	Challenger	Notes	Ref
Carolyn Bourdeaux	Democratic	Georgia 7th	2020	Lucy McBath	Lost to fellow incumbent	
Madison Cawthorn	Republican	North Carolina 11th	2020	Chuck Edwards		
Liz Cheney	Republican	Wyoming at-large	2016	Harriet Hageman		
Rodney Davis	Republican	Illinois 13th	2012	Mary Miller	Redistricted to the 15th district; lost to fellow incumbent	
Jaime Herrera Beutler	Republican	Washington 3rd	2010	Joe Kent	Lost in blanket primary; challenger lost general election	
Mondaire Jones	Democratic	New York 17th	2020	Dan Goldman	Redistricted to the 10th district	
Andy Levin	Democratic	Michigan 9th	2018	Haley Stevens	Redistricted to the 11th district; lost to fellow incumbent	
Carolyn Maloney	Democratic	New York 12th	1992	Jerry Nadler	Lost to fellow incumbent	
David McKinley	Republican	West Virginia 1st	2010	Alex Mooney	Redistricted to the 2nd district; lost to fellow incumbent	
Peter Meijer	Republican	Michigan 3rd	2020	John Gibbs	Challenger lost general election	
Marie Newman	Democratic	Illinois 3rd	2020	Sean Casten	Redistricted to the 6th district; lost to fellow incumbent	
Steven Palazzo	Republican	Mississippi 4th	2010	Mike Ezell		
Tom Rice	Republican	South Carolina 7th	2012	Russell Fry		
Kurt Schrader	Democratic	Oregon 5th	2008	Jamie McLeod-Skinner	Challenger lost general election	

== 2024 ==
Member	Party	District	First elected	Challenger	Notes	Ref
Jamaal Bowman	Democratic	New York 16th	2020	George Latimer		
Cori Bush	Democratic	Missouri 1st	2020	Wesley Bell		
Jerry Carl	Republican	Alabama 1st	2020	Barry Moore	Lost to fellow incumbent	
Bob Good	Republican	Virginia 5th	2020	John McGuire		

== 2026 ==
Member	Party	District	First elected	Challenger	Notes	Ref
Dan Crenshaw	Republican	Texas 2nd	2018	Steve Toth		
Diana DeGette	Democratic	Colorado 1st	1996	Melat Kiros		
Adriano Espaillat	Democratic	New York 13th	2016	Darializa Avila Chevalier		
Dan Goldman	Democratic	New York 10th	2022	Brad Lander		
Al Green	Democratic	Texas 9th	2004	Christian Menefee	Redistricted to the 18th district; lost to fellow incumbent	
Julie Johnson	Democratic	Texas 32nd	2024	Colin Allred	Redistricted to the 33rd district	
John B. Larson	Democratic	Connecticut 1st	1998	Luke Bronin		
Thomas Massie	Republican	Kentucky 4th	2012	Ed Gallrein		
Cory Mills	Republican	Florida 7th	2022	Ryan Elijah		
Andy Ogles	Republican	Tennessee 5th	2022	Charlie Hatcher		
Shri Thanedar	Democratic	Michigan 13th	2022	Donavan McKinney		

== See also ==
- List of United States representatives who served a single term
