= Tennessee House of Representatives 97th district =

State legislative district in Tennessee

Tennessee's 97th State House of Representatives district
- Map of Tennessee House districts with the 97th District shaded in red
Representative
John Gillespie; R–Memphis
- Demographics: 64% White; 15% Black; 14% Hispanic; 4% Asian; 1% Other; 3% Multiracial
- Population (2024): 71,684

Tennessee House of Representatives 97th district is one of the 99 legislative districts in the Tennessee House of Representatives. The district lies in the middle of Shelby County, Tennessee, including parts of East Memphis and a small area of unincorporated Cordova. It has been represented by John Gillespie since 2021. The district is considered highly competitive in elections. In 2024, Kamala Harris won the district with a margin of 3.9%.

== Demographics ==
The Tennessee Comptroller estimates the population as of 2024 at 71,684.

- 64.1% of the district is White
- 14.5% of the district is Black
- 14.2% of the district is Hispanic
- 3.5% of the district is Asian
- 2.7% of the district is Multiracial
- 0.7% of the district is another race

Detailed demographic information is also available at Census Reporter.

== List of Representatives ==
Representative	Party	Years of Service	General Assemblys	Hometown
John Gillespie	Republican	January 12, 2021 – present	112th-114th	Memphis
Jim Coley	Republican	2007-2021	105th-111th	Memphis
Tre Hargett	Republican	1997–2007	100th-104th	Memphis
Tim Joyce	Republican	1991-1997	97th-99th	Memphis
Chris Turner	Democratic	1977–1990	90th-96th	Memphis
Edward J. Bousson Jr.	Republican	1973–1976	88th-89th	Memphis

== Elections ==
=== 2024 ===
2024 Tennessee House of Representatives District 97 general election
Party	Candidate	Votes	%
Republican	John Gillespie (incumbent)	16,368	51.64%
Democratic	Jesse Huseth	15,292	48.24%
Write-in		39	0.12%
Total votes		31,699	100.00%
Republican hold			

=== 2022 ===
2022 Tennessee House of Representatives District 97 general election
Party	Candidate	Votes	%
Republican	John Gillespie (incumbent)	12,083	56.72%
Democratic	Toniko Harris	9,219	43.28%
Total votes		21,302	100.00%
Republican hold			

=== 2020 ===
2020 Tennessee House of Representatives District 97 General Election
Party	Candidate	Votes	%
Republican	John Gillespie	14,712	50.80%
Democratic	Gabby Salinas	14,246	49.20%
Total votes		28,958	100.00%
Republican hold			

=== 2018 ===
2018 Tennessee House of Representatives District 97 General Election
Party	Candidate	Votes	%
Republican	Jim Coley	12,386	54.93%
Democratic	Allan Creasy	10,163	45.07%
Total votes		22,549	100.00%
Republican hold			
