= Andy Ogles =

American politician (born 1971)

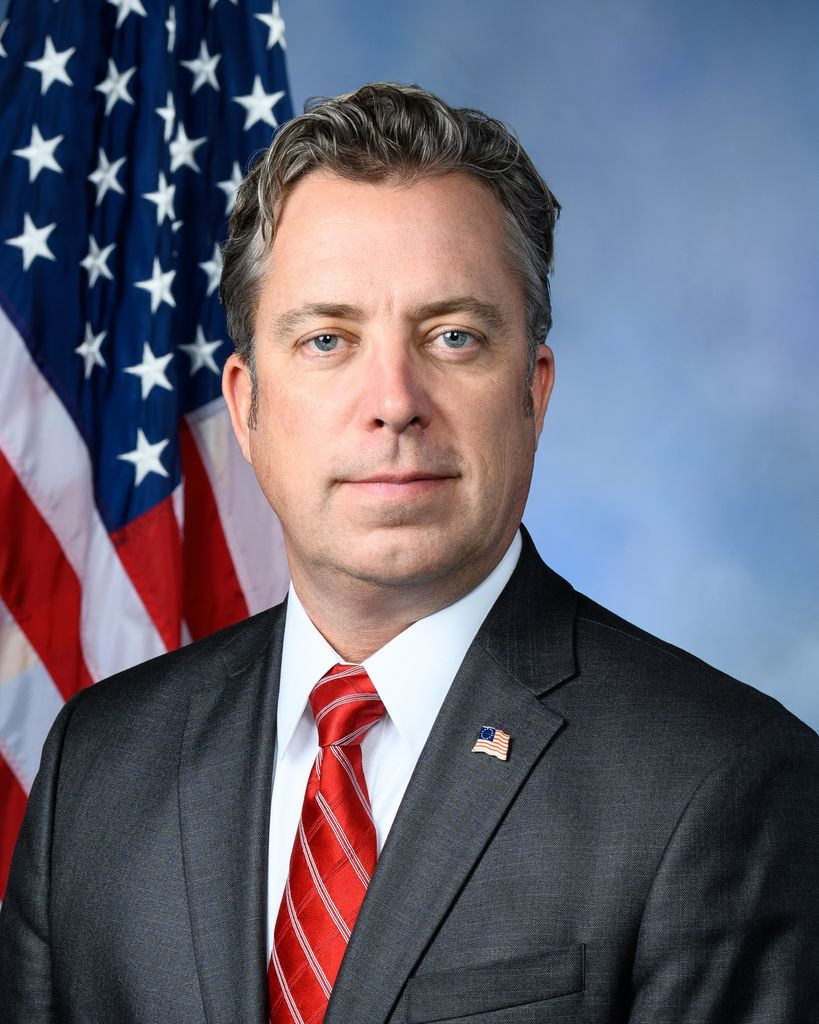
- Official portrait, 2022

Member of the U.S. House of Representatives from Tennessee's 5th district
- Incumbent
- Assumed office January 3, 2023
- Preceded by: Jim Cooper

Mayor of Maury County
- In office September 1, 2018 – August 30, 2022
- Preceded by: Charlie Norman
- Succeeded by: Sheila Butt

Personal details
- Born: William Andrew Ogles IV; June 18, 1971 (age 55) Nashville, Tennessee, U.S.
- Party: Republican
- Spouse: Monica Ogles (m. 1994)
- Children: 3
- Relatives: Brandon Ogles (cousin)
- Education: Middle Tennessee State University (BS)
- Website: House website; Campaign website

William Andrew Ogles IV (/ˈoʊɡəlz/ OH-gəlz; born June 18, 1971) is an American politician and business owner serving as the U.S. representative for Tennessee's 5th congressional district since 2023. A member of the Republican Party, he previously served as the mayor of Maury County, Tennessee, from 2018 to 2022.

Ogles has taken strongly conservative positions and been described by media as being on the far-right of the political spectrum. He has called for Christian nationalism in the United States, and he opposes abortion and same-sex marriage. He was one of the original 19 Republican members of Congress to vote against Kevin McCarthy for Speaker of the House. He is known for his staunch support for Donald Trump, and for sending Christmas cards featuring a photo of his family holding rifles.

During the attempts to overturn the 2020 United States presidential election, Ogles stated that it was stolen. He has proposed a constitutional amendment to enable Trump to serve a third presidential term and filed articles of impeachment against judges who rule against the Trump administration. Ogles has been criticized for lying about his education and career backgrounds, having falsely claimed to be both an economist and law-enforcement officer, and has been designated an anti-Muslim extremist by CAIR.

Ogles lost re-nomination to former Tennessee Agriculture Commissioner Charlie Hatcher in 2026.

== Early life and education ==
Ogles was born on June 18, 1971. A native of Middle Tennessee, he graduated from Franklin High School and later attended Western Kentucky University and Columbia State Community College from 1990 to 1993. Ogles later studied at Middle Tennessee State University (MTSU), where he failed every course taken in the fall of 1995 and the fall of 1998; he returned to the university in 2007 and graduated with a 2.4 grade point average, with a Bachelor of Science in liberal studies. Ogles said in late February 2023 that his failed university courses were due to "an interfamilial matter" that led him to abandon his studies "to financially support my family during a difficult time" and that he eventually completed his studies with online courses. Ogles graduated with a degree in liberal studies.

=== Disputed education details ===
After Ogles became a congressman in 2023, his congressional biography claimed that he received his degree from MTSU, "where he studied policy and economics." Ogles' claim was questioned by NewsChannel 5 in February 2023, which published an investigatory report detailing that in a 2009 resume and also in a background check of unspecified date, Ogles claimed to have an MTSU degree in international relations, with minors in psychology and English. NewsChannel 5 additionally reported that MTSU declined to confirm Ogles' degree, referencing a federal law allowing students like Ogles the ability to block the release of academic records. Ogles later spoke to WWTN radio, calling for everyone to "lock down your transcripts ... so you're not a victim of identity theft." In other comments to WWTN made on February 21, 2023, Ogles said that he does not remember "saying I had an economics degree ... because I've been quite clear that I studied political science and international relations", while maintaining that he studied political science from "the economic perspective".

On February 26, 2023, Ogles said that he was "mistaken" in claiming to have an MTSU degree in international relations, and claimed that he requested his college transcript the week before, and only learned then that his degree was actually in liberal studies. NewsChannel 5 called Ogles's statement "apparently preemptive" because Ogles "ignored our requests for comment" after the media outlet obtained his MTSU transcript from an old job application. On February 27, NewsChannel 5 published Ogles's transcript, which showed that Ogles took only one economics course at a community college, scoring a C pass, while at MTSU he passed nine political science courses (and failed several others). By February 28, Ogles's congressional biography was edited to simply state: "Andy obtained his degree from MTSU." NewsChannel 5 also investigated Ogles' claims of having done graduate work in marketing at Vanderbilt University Owen Graduate School of Management and Amos Tuck School of Business Administration at Dartmouth College, and learned that Ogles took online non-credit courses in certificate programs rather than graduate courses.

== Business and early political career ==
Ogles's involvement in politics began when he became the first director of the Tennessee chapter of Americans for Prosperity, a conservative political advocacy group founded by the Koch Brothers. He later became involved with the Laffer Center, a conservative think tank. He has also been a Club for Growth Foundation fellow. Ogles made two unsuccessful bids for elected office, a run for the state's 4th congressional district in 2002 and the Tennessee Senate in 2006, losing in the Republican primary both times.

In September 2017, Ogles announced he would challenge incumbent U.S. senator Bob Corker, who he believed was insufficiently conservative, in the following year's primary. Upon announcing his bid, Ogles was financially supported by Lee Beaman, a Tennessee businessman who owns a large auto dealership chain and who planned to raise $4 million for Ogles. Two months later, Corker announced that he would retire instead of seeking the 2018 nomination. That led incumbent U.S. representative Marsha Blackburn, the eventual winner, and former representative Stephen Fincher to announce they would seek the seat. As their respective campaigns were likely to be well funded, Ogles announced shortly afterward that he would withdraw.

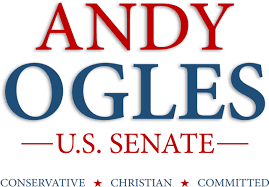
Ogles' 2017 senate campaign logo

=== Disputed career claims ===
Ogles has repeatedly made public claims of being an economist. Ogles had worked for roughly five years as an anti-tax lobbyist with Americans for Prosperity, and then for a year as the executive director of the Laffer Center, an organization run by economist Arthur Laffer. A NewsChannel 5 report questioned his claims, noting that any columns he wrote on economic policy were written when he was a lobbyist, before he worked for the Laffer Center.

At a political debate, Ogles called himself "a former member of law enforcement, worked in international sex crimes, specifically child trafficking", while at a separate forum, he said: "I went into law enforcement. I worked in human trafficking." NewsChannel 5 reported that Ogles was a volunteer reserve deputy with the Williamson County Sheriff's Office from 2009 to 2011, with his position revoked for failing to meet minimum standards, failing to progress in field training, and failing to attend required meetings. The Williamson County Sheriff's Office said that records do not show Ogles trained or worked against international sex trafficking as a reserve deputy.

In 2011, Ogles worked as a chief operating officer for Abolition International, a non-profit organisation which described its work as giving grants to "holistic ministries". Ogles indicated that since his stint at Abolition International overlapped his stint as a reserve deputy, "Maybe I created some of the confusion or maybe it was someone looking to write a story". While Ogles claimed he was "heavily involved in the fight against human trafficking", NewsChannel 5 reported that Abolition International's tax records showed that Ogles worked in a part-time position that paid him $4,000 in total. Ogles' congressional website originally claimed that Ogles was "overseeing operations and investments in 12 countries" for Abolition International; but NewsChannel 5 disputed that number as too large; the website later amended its claim to overseeing operations and investments in "several countries."

=== County mayoralty ===
Initially considered a potential contender in the 2018 Tennessee gubernatorial election, Ogles instead saw his major first electoral success when he was elected mayor of Maury County in the August 2, 2018, general election, defeating incumbent Charlie Norman. During his mayoralty, Ogles criticized Tennessee governor Bill Lee for not restricting local school boards' ability to implement mask mandates in response to the COVID-19 pandemic, calling for the state legislature to pass legislation to support his position in a special session. He supported a sales tax increase that passed in 2020.

Ogles initially filed to run for a second term as county mayor but withdrew to enter the race for the redrawn U.S. House of Representatives seat in Tennessee's 5th congressional district in 2022. After he had announced his candidacy for Congress, he vetoed the county and school budget increases over a 31-cent property tax increase. In a letter he sent to the county commission chairman, he claimed that the "County Library went full woke exposing children to age inappropriate material." The county commission complained it had not been aware of any concerns Ogles had had over the budget, noting that he rarely attended meetings and had taken no part in the budget process. Ogles said that since he could not vote at the meetings it was not necessary for him to attend them and that he kept up by watching them online. Two weeks later the county commission overrode the veto, citing Maury's status as the fastest-growing county in the state.

== U.S. House of Representatives ==
=== Election ===
==== 2022 ====
===== Primary =====
Ogles seemed to some observers to have gotten off to a strong start in the primary, specifically credited to his nearly half a million dollars raised in the campaign's first month. Though, campaign finance disclosure reports showed that he had raised only $264,400, with a $320,000 personal loan to the campaign. Among the many rival candidates, two stood out as serious challengers: former state House speaker Beth Harwell, and retired U.S. Army brigadier general Kurt Winstead. Ads by the Tennessee Conservatives Political Action Committee (TCPAC) called Ogles a "D.C. insider" and lobbyist who had failed to pay his property taxes nine times while supporting the sales tax hike and a marriage tax, as well as failing to vigorously oppose Maury County's recent property tax hike. Records showed that Ogles had indeed been from a few days to almost a year late paying taxes on his Franklin home between 2005 and 2015, leading to interest charges. He filed a defamation suit against TCPAC. Ogles, in turn, was supported by super PACs that ran ads attacking Harwell and Winstead as "too liberal for Tennessee." On August 4, Ogles won the primary.

===== General =====
Ogles faced Tennessee senator Heidi Campbell in the November general election. The district was previously a Democratic stronghold centered on Nashville, but had been redrawn as an area that voted for Republican Donald Trump by 12 percentage points in the 2020 presidential election. This was done by splitting heavily Democratic Nashville into three congressional districts. When the new district boundaries were announced, the Democratic incumbent decided to retire, calling the new district "unwinnable" for a Democrat. Ogles was endorsed by the House Freedom Caucus, the House Republican Conference's farthest-right bloc.

During the campaign, Ogles avoided the major local media in favor of conservative local talk radio and posted very little on social media. Early in the campaign, he made some appearances with a flamethrower, saying he would use it on President Joe Biden's work when he got to Washington. A late October appearance with Texas U.S. senator Ted Cruz in Franklin was announced in his first campaign-related Twitter post since he won the Republican primary. He declined several invitations to debate.

Ogles was slightly outraised and outspent by Campbell. He raised almost $1 million for his campaign, including what he falsely represented at the time as a $320,000 personal loan, and spent $573,000. In contrast, Campbell raised over $1 million, without the use of personal loans, and spent $679,000 largely on television ads. Ogles won the general election in November with 56% of the vote to Campbell's 42%, becoming the first Republican to represent the state's 5th district since the 19th century. As a result, Nashville was not represented by a single Democrat in Congress for the first time in modern history.

==== 2024 ====
Ogles ran for re-election and won the primary by a somewhat comfortable margin over Nashville metro councilor Courtney Johnston. Ogles comfortably won re-election, improving on his performance compared to the previous election. Notably, the Republican primary was more competitive than the general election.

=== Tenure ===
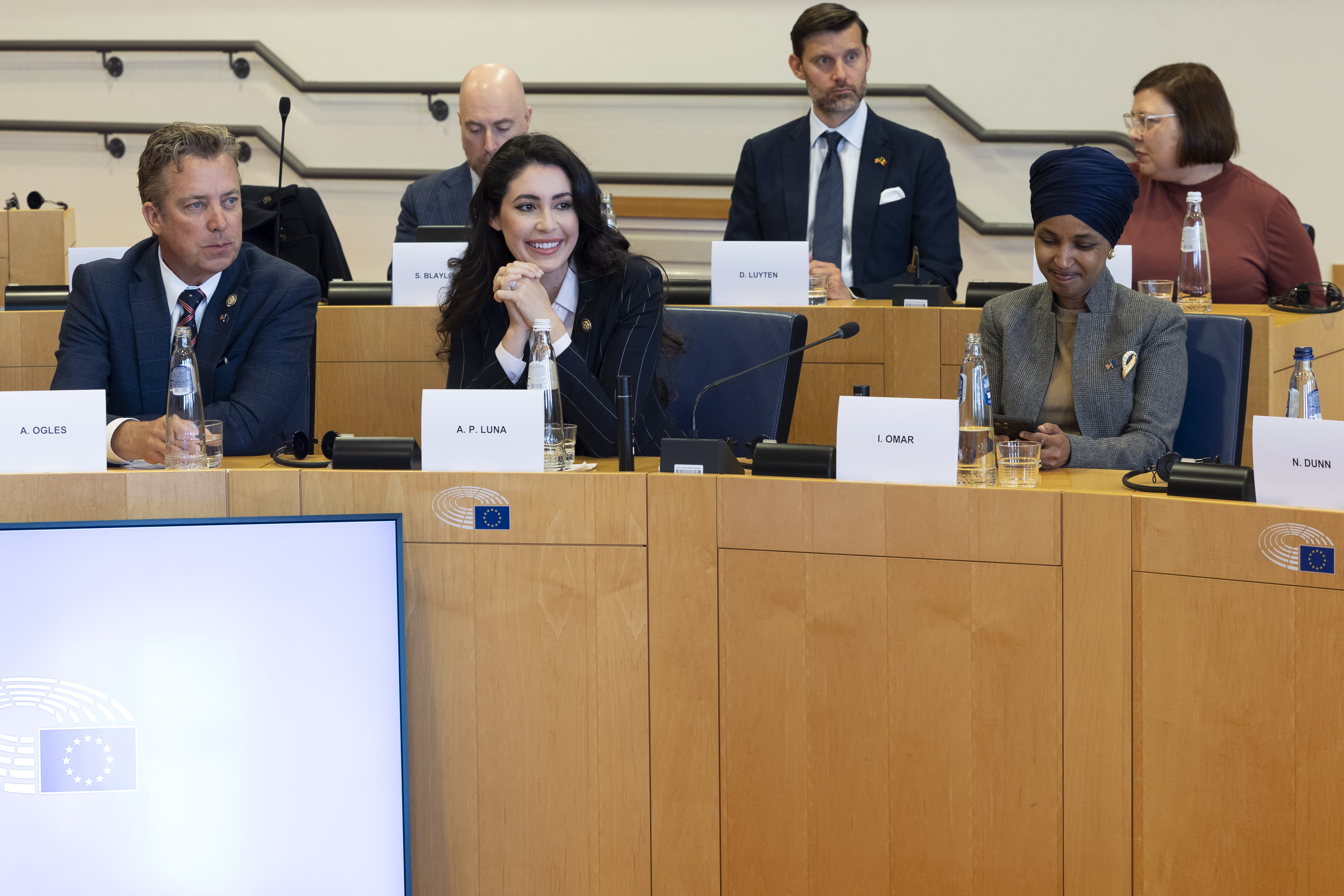
Ogles during a meeting in the European Parliament next to Anna Paulina Luna, April 2025

On January 1, 2023, Ogles signed a letter by fellow representatives Scott Perry and Chip Roy expressing opposition to fellow Republican Kevin McCarthy in the upcoming house speakership election after McCarthy did not accept all their proposed House rules changes. On January 3, his first day in office, Ogles joined far-right House Republicans in voting against McCarthy on the first three ballots. This was the first time since 1923 that a speaker was not elected on the first ballot. On January 6, after days of negotiations, Ogles voted for McCarthy on the 12th ballot, joining the rest of Tennessee's Republican delegation. He explained in a statement that this was because he believed negotiations between McCarthy and the other holdouts were going well.

Shortly after being sworn in, Ogles was appointed to the House Financial Services Committee. The first bill Ogles introduced, the Inflation Reduction Act of 2023, would repeal the previous year's Inflation Reduction Act. In president Joe Biden's State of the Union speech, he mentioned the bill without mentioning Ogles's name, which Ogles took credit for in a subsequent tweet. Ogles is part of the Freedom Caucus.

In February 2024, during an argument with a pro-Palestinian activist questioning him about Palestinian child casualties in the Gaza war, Ogles told the activist "So, I think we should kill 'em all if that makes you feel better— everybody in Hamas. Hamas and the Palestinians have been attacking Israel for 20 years. It's time to pay the piper... Death to Hamas!" The American Muslim Advisory Council criticized Ogles' comments, claiming that he was endorsing the "extermination of the Palestinian people." A spokeswoman for Ogles stated that Ogles "was not referring to Palestinians, he was clearly referring to the Hamas terrorist group." Ogles would further state that he supported the right of Israel "to punish Hamas on a scale of Biblical proportions, including their accomplices and the facilitators of the aforementioned atrocities. I stand by what I said: Death to Hamas." The American Muslim Advisory Council called these remarks "genocidal rhetoric".

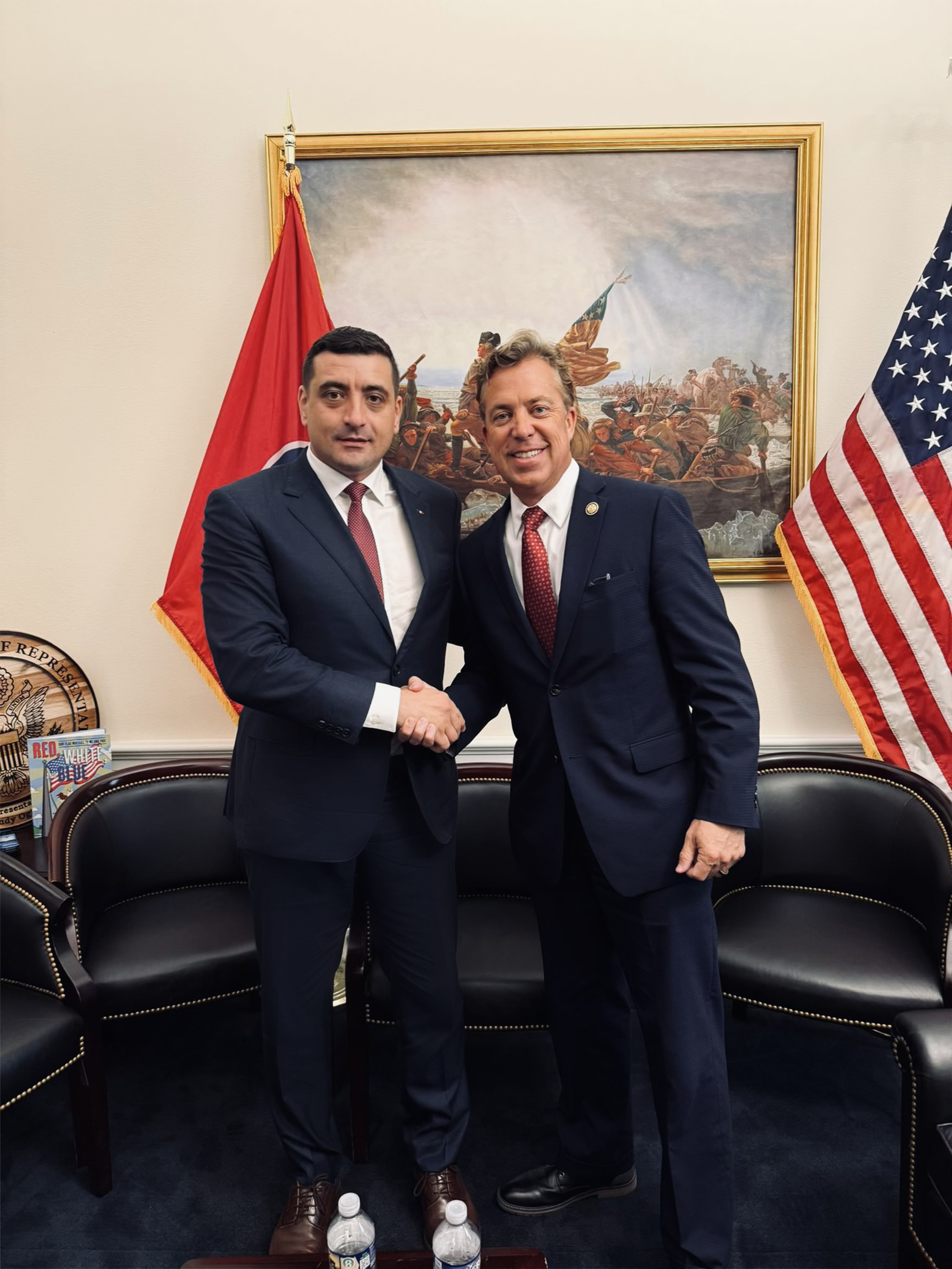
Ogles with Romanian politician George Simion, June 2025

In May 2024, Ogles introduced a pair of bills in the House in response to the 2024 pro-Palestinian protests on university campuses. The first bill, entitled the Antisemitism Community Service Act (HR 8321), would send anyone who has committed a crime on a college campus since October 7, 2023, the date of the 2023 Hamas-led attack on Israel, to the Gaza Strip to perform six months of community service, though the text of the bill appears to apply regardless of whether the crime in question was related to a pro-Palestinian protest. The second bill, entitled the Study Abroad Act (HR 8322), would cancel travel visas for those who have been arrested "for rioting or unlawful protest" or for "establishing, participating, or promoting an encampment" on college campuses since October 7, 2023.

On January 23, 2025, three days into Trump's second administration, he filed a resolution which would change the 22nd Amendment to allow Trump to serve a third term, by allowing presidents who serve two non-consecutive terms to run for a third term. On February 24, 2025, after Judge John D. Bates ruled against the Trump administration in a lawsuit involving the removal of "gender ideology" content from federal health websites, Ogles introduced an article of impeachment, alleging that Bates' lack of "intellectual honesty and basic integrity" constituted a high crime and misdemeanor. A month later, he filed an article of impeachment against Judge Theodore Chuang, claiming that Chuang had "marginalized the President's Article II authority" when he ruled against the administration in a case involving the dismantling of the U.S. Agency for International Development. Ogles also attempted to prevent dozens of Democratic representatives from continuing to serve on House committees.

=== Campaign finance issues ===
Ogles filed his first campaign finance report more than a week after the deadline, the only candidate in the race at that time to be late in doing so. He blamed the delay on "issues retrieving bank statements". When he did file it, the report showed that the campaign had raised $254,000 instead of the $453,000 it claimed shortly after Ogles launched it. Questions were raised about the $320,000 loan Ogles claimed to have made his campaign, a loan not reflected in any of his personal financial disclosures to the House and beyond his apparent means. In May 2024 the campaign filed 11 amendments to its reports over the past two years restating the amount loaned as $20,000. Ogles said the larger amount previously stated was a "pledge" as to how much of his own money he was prepared to put into the campaign if necessary and was mistakenly included on the reports. NewsChannel 5 reported that the FBI raided his Maury County home on August 1, 2024, as part of an investigation into his campaign finances.

=== Caucus memberships ===
- Freedom Caucus

== Political positions ==
Media outlets have characterized Ogles's political views as conservative, or far-right. On January 1, 2026, Ogles called for a fight to make the United States "a Christian nation", posting to Facebook, "We must stand and reaffirm that this is a Christian Nation ... This is a battle of good vs evil", accompanying his text with an AI-generated video of himself dressed as a knight with a cross on his chest raising a sword and calling an army to battle. Ogles opposes abortion and same-sex marriage. In a 2022 interview, he downplayed the need for exceptions in an abortion bill, calling them "red herrings". In June 2022, after the repeal of Roe v. Wade (1973), Ogles said, "The next thing we have to do is go after gay marriage." In June 2026, on the start of Pride Month, he tweeted: "Homosexuality has no place in America. Happy Nuclear Family Month." He later deleted the tweet.

Ogles called for the impeachment of President Joe Biden and Vice President Kamala Harris, and for treason charges to be brought against Secretary of Homeland Security Alejandro Mayorkas. He has called for the United States Department of Education to be defunded. Ogles denies the legitimacy of the 2020 United States presidential election. Ogles supports school choice, deregulating health care, and lower taxes. He opposes earmarks. In July 2022, Ogles signed a pledge for an amendment to term limit representatives. In November 2023, Ogles voiced climate change denial during a House debate, saying "I just went trick or treating with my kids and it was like, you know, the low that evening was 29 degrees, so temperatures change, alright? Temperatures have been changing for the millennia."

In January 2025, Ogles proposed to amend the Twenty-second Amendment to the United States Constitution to allow American presidents who have two non-consecutive presidency terms to seek a third term as president. This would allow Donald Trump to seek a third term, but not presidents with consecutive presidency terms such as Barack Obama, George W. Bush, and Bill Clinton. Ogles' rationale was that Trump "has proven himself to be the only figure in modern history capable of reversing our nation's decay", so it was "imperative that we provide President Trump with every resource necessary ... we, as legislators and as states, must do everything in our power to support him."

Ogles called for Chicago-born Illinois representative Delia Ramirez to be denaturalized and deported. In February 2026, he said the Super Bowl LX halftime show featuring Bad Bunny was "gay pornography", "pure smut", and alleged it contained "explicit displays of gay sexual acts" and lyrics that "openly glorified sodomy" and was "conclusive proof that Puerto Rico should never be a state". Ogles supports remigration, which has been characterized as ethnic cleansing achieved through mass deportations. At the annual gala of the New York Young Republican Club, Ogles called for the deportation of immigrants who didn't come from "compatible nations" and said immigrants must "worship our God" or "get the hell out." In March 2026, Ogles shared praise for his support for remigration on social media from the Providence Society, a group with white supremacist views.

=== Islam ===
In June 2025, two days after the New York mayoral primary, Ogles wrote a letter to Attorney General Pam Bondi calling for Zohran Mamdani to be denaturalized and deported from the United States. Ogles reiterated the statement in a Twitter post, referring to Mamdani as "little Muhammad", for which he was criticized by some Democrats. Ogles further called Mamdani a "communist who has publicly embraced a terroristic ideology." Ogles claimed that Mamdani, who immigrated to the United States as a child, "came to America for one reason: To turn America into an Islamic theocracy." The day before the November general election, Ogles posted graphic footage of the 9/11 attacks, writing in a tweet, "WAKE UP NEW YORK!"

In March 2026, Ogles said he would introduce legislation which would ban immigration from nearly a dozen predominately Muslim countries, including Yemen and Sudan, claiming travelers from these countries represented a national security risk. On March 9, 2026, the same day two men in New York City were charged with an attempted bombing allegedly inspired by the Islamic State, Ogles posted a number of statements on social media widely condemned as Islamophobic, writing that "Muslims don't belong in American society" and stating that "pluralism is a lie." Following New York City mayor Zohran Mamdani's statement in response to the attempted bombing, Ogles wrote: "The [Department of Justice] can deport him today. All they need to do is read his file." Next to his statements, Ogles posted mugshots of Muslim men he identified as from Somalia and Senegal, the latter of whom had committed a mass shooting in Austin, Texas. Ogles was condemned by Democratic members of Congress such as Hakeem Jeffries and Katherine Clark, as well as by organizations such as CAIR and the Jewish Council for Public Affairs. In response to the condemnations, Ogles blamed the Democratic Party for shutting down the Department of Homeland Security as having allowed for attacks to occur. In the month following March 9, Ogles shared anti-Muslim content on X more than 100 times. In one post, in which Ogles declared that "America is a product of English Christian culture. NOT Islamic culture," Ogles inaccurately claimed that the first settlers of Jamestown, Virginia, were Puritans.

== Personal life ==
Ogles lives on a farm in Culleoka, Tennessee with his wife Monica and their three children. When Ogles visits Washington, D.C., he has stayed at a townhouse operated by Steve Berger, an evangelical pastor. His cousin Brandon Ogles is a former member of the Tennessee House of Representatives. Ogles faced criticism when nearly $25,000 in donations received via GoFundMe to finance a child burial garden in his stillborn child's memory appeared to have gone unspent.

== Electoral history ==
2002 Tennessee's 4th Congressional District Republican Primary Results
Party	Candidate	Votes	%
Republican	Janice Bowling	20,709	37.10
Republican	Mike Greene	13,563	24.30
Republican	Andy Ogles	8,201	14.69
Republican	John Bumpus	7,245	12.98
Republican	Mike Coffield	4,991	8.94
Republican	Harvey Howard	1,063	1.91
Republican	Write-ins	41	0.07
Total votes		55,813	100.0

2006 Tennessee's 23rd Senate District Republican Primary Results
Party	Candidate	Votes	%
Republican	Jack Johnson	4,623	30.72
Republican	Ray "Chip" T. Throckmorton, III	4,351	28.91
Republican	Tom Neill	3,408	22.64
Republican	Jeff Ford	1,662	11.04
Republican	Bob Barnwell	698	4.64
Republican	Andy Ogles	309	2.05
Total votes		15,051	100.0

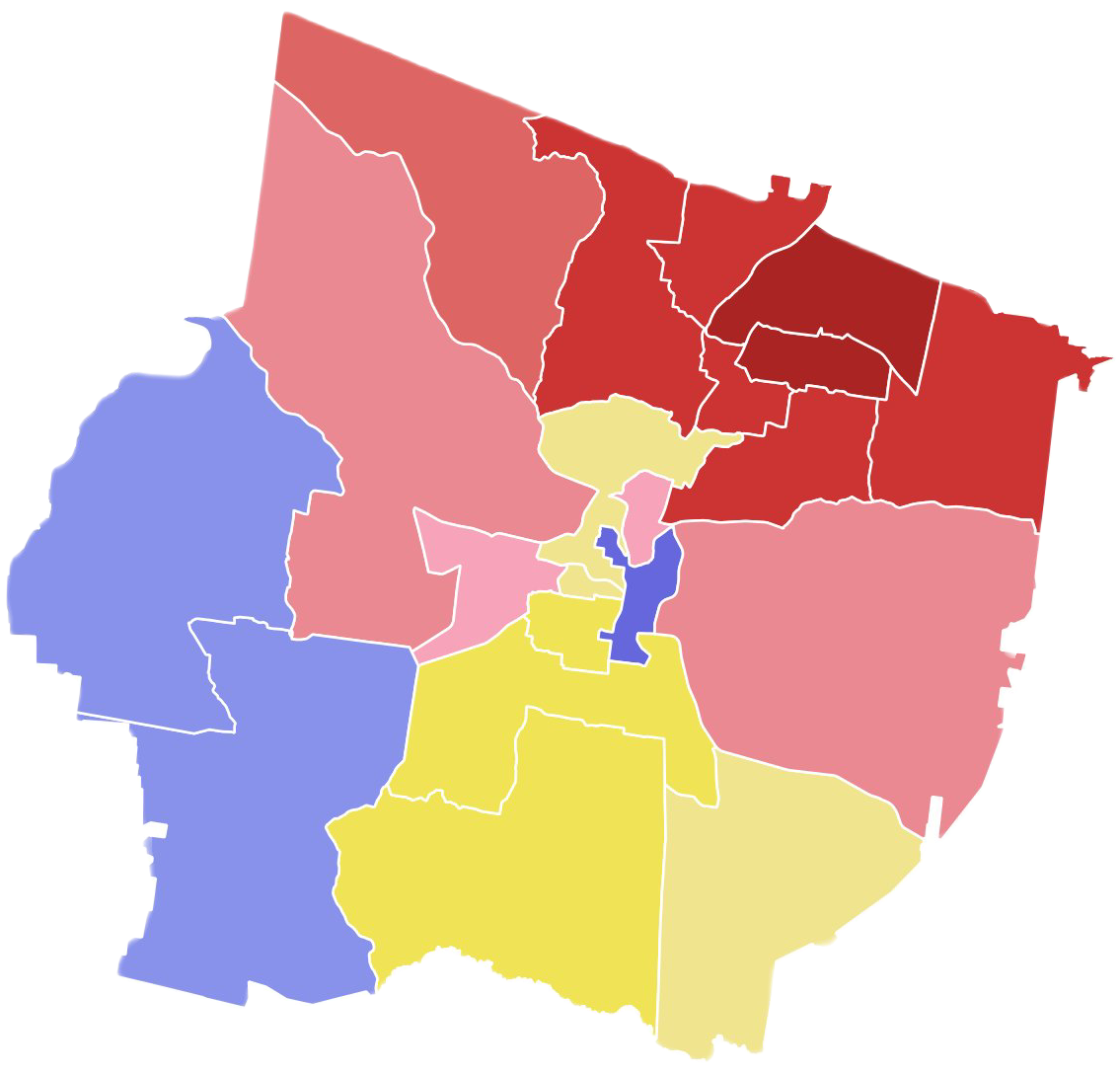
2018 Mayoral election by precinct: Ogles: >30%; >35%; >40%; >45%; >50%; Norman: >35%; >40%; Shackelford: >30%; >35%

2018 Maury County Mayoral election
Party	Candidate	Votes	%
Republican	Andy Ogles	6,843	36.53
Independent	Charlie Norman (incumbent)	5,387	28.75
Independent	Sonny Shackelford	5,031	26.85
Independent	Amanda P. Kelton	1,474	7.87
Total votes		18,735	100.0
Republican hold			

2022 Tennessee's 5th Congressional District Republican Primary Results
Party	Candidate	Votes	%
Republican	Andy Ogles	21,298	36.9
Republican	Beth Harwell	14,998	26.0
Republican	Kurt Winstead	12,709	22.0
Republican	Jeff Beierlien	4,086	7.1
Republican	Natisha Brooks	1,740	3.0
Republican	Geni Batchelor	1,016	1.8
Republican	Timothy Bruce Lee	843	1.5
Republican	Stewart T. Parks	585	1.0
Republican	Tres Wittum	397	0.7
Total votes		57,672	100.0

2022 Tennessee's 5th Congressional District election
Party	Candidate	Votes	%
Republican	Andy Ogles	123,358	55.87
Democratic	Heidi Campbell	93,375	42.29
Independent	Derrick Brantley	2,083	0.94
Independent	Daniel Cooper	1,125	0.51
Independent	Rich Shannon	846	0.38
Total votes		220,787	100.0

2024 Tennessee's 5th Congressional District Republican Primary Results
Party	Candidate	Votes	%
Republican	Andy Ogles (incumbent)	32,047	56.54%
Republican	Courtney Johnston	24,634	43.46%
Total votes		56,681	100.00%

2024 Tennessee's 5th congressional district election
Party	Candidate	Votes	%
Republican	Andy Ogles (incumbent)	205,075	56.85%
Democratic	Maryam Abolfazli	142,387	39.47%
Independent	Jim Larkin	7,607	2.11%
Independent	Bob Titley	3,065	0.85%
Independent	Yomi Faparusi	2,580	0.72%
Total votes		360,714	100.00%

== See also ==
- List of United States representatives who lost re-election in a primary

U.S. House of Representatives
Preceded by Jim Cooper	Member of the U.S. House of Representatives from Tennessee's 5th congressional district 2023–present	Incumbent
U.S. order of precedence (ceremonial)
Preceded by Zach Nunn	United States representatives by seniority 342nd	Succeeded by Brittany Pettersen
