= Jim Coley =

American politician (1951–2021)

Member of the Tennessee House of Representatives from the 97th district
- In office January 9, 2007 – January 12, 2021
- Preceded by: Tre Hargett
- Succeeded by: John Gillespie

Personal details
- Born: February 11, 1951 Houston, Texas, U.S.
- Died: October 10, 2021 (aged 70)
- Party: Republican
- Spouse: Paula
- Children: 2
- Education: Memphis State University (BA); University of Memphis (MAT)
- Occupation: Politician; teacher

Jim Coley (February 11, 1951 – October 10, 2021) was an American politician and a Republican member of the Tennessee House of Representatives for the 97th district, which encompasses part of Shelby County from 2007 to 2021.

== Education and career ==
Jim Coley was first elected to the 105th Tennessee General Assembly (2007–2008). He was a member of the House Education Committee, the House State and Local Committee, the House State Government Subcommittee, the House Higher Education Subcommittee, and the House Special Initiatives Subcommittee. Rep. Coley worked as a teacher at Bolton High School. He graduated from Memphis State University with a Bachelor of Arts degree with honors. He obtained his Master of Arts degree in Teaching from the University of Memphis.

Coley was instrumental in introducing several different bills in 2011 and 2012 regarding the practice of human trafficking. The bills introduced made sentencing against traffickers much more strict, as well as providing more outreach to those who survive the practice. His work, along with his co-sponsors and NGO Operation Broken Silence, moved Tennessee to number 2 in the nation in the Polaris Project's annual state-by-state rankings of legislative work being done to stop modern slavery.

Rep. Coley's immediate family consists of his ex-wife, Paula Coley, a CPA, and his son and daughter, Evan and Erin, respectively.

He was diagnosed with dementia in 2020. He died on October 10, 2021, at age 70.

Tennessee House of Representatives
Preceded by Tre Hargett	Member of the Tennessee House of Representatives from the 97th district 2007–2021	Succeeded by John Gillespie
