= John Gillespie (Tennessee politician) =

American politician (born 1987)

Member of the Tennessee House of Representatives from the 97th district
- In office January 12, 2021 – January 2027
- Preceded by: Jim Coley
- Succeeded by: Jesse Huseth (elect)

Personal details
- Born: January 17, 1987 (age 39) Memphis, Tennessee, U.S.
- Party: Republican
- Education: High Point University (BA)

John Marston Gillespie (born January 17, 1987) is an American politician who served as a Republican member of the Tennessee House of Representatives from the 97th district from 2021 to 2027. Representing parts of East Memphis and Cordova in Shelby County, Tennessee, he served three terms—including as vice chair of the House Finance, Ways, and Means Committee in the 114th Tennessee General Assembly—before losing re-election to Democratic challenger Jesse Huseth in November 2026.

== Early life and career ==
Gillespie was born in Memphis, Tennessee. He graduated from High Point University in North Carolina, earning a Bachelor of Arts degree in political science.

Gillespie began his career in banking as a financial service representative at First Tennessee Bank before moving to the mortgage division at Evolve Bank & Trust. He later transitioned into nonprofit development, serving as a grant coordinator for Trezevant Manor (Trezevant Episcopal Home), a senior living community in Memphis.

In civic and community leadership, Gillespie has served on the board of directors of the Memphis Shelby Crime Commission and as a member of the Phoenix Club of Memphis, a young professionals organization that raises funds for the Boys & Girls Clubs of Greater Memphis.

== Tennessee House of Representatives ==
=== Elections ===
==== 2020 ====
Following the retirement of longtime Republican incumbent Jim Coley, Gillespie ran for the open 97th district seat. In the August 6, 2020 Republican primary, he defeated Brandon Weise with 78.2% of the vote. In the November 3, 2020 general election, Gillespie defeated Democratic nominee Gabby Salinas by 466 votes (50.8% to 49.2%).

==== 2022 ====
Gillespie ran unopposed in the August 4, 2022 Republican primary and defeated Democratic challenger Toniko Harris in the November 8, 2022 general election, winning 56.7% of the vote to Harris's 43.3%.

==== 2024 ====
In the August 1, 2024 Republican primary, Gillespie defeated challenger Christina Oppenhuizen with 95.4% of the vote. He faced Democratic nominee Jesse Huseth in the November 5, 2024 general election, winning a third term with 51.6% of the vote (16,368 votes) to Huseth's 48.2% (15,292 votes).

==== 2026 ====
Gillespie ran unopposed in the August 6, 2026 Republican primary. In a November 3, 2026 general election rematch, he was defeated by Democrat Jesse Huseth, receiving 43.0% of the vote (10,502 votes) to Huseth's 57.0% (13,895 votes).

=== Tenure and legislative activity ===
Gillespie took office in January 2021 at the start of the 112th Tennessee General Assembly and served through the 113th and 114th General Assemblies. During his tenure, his legislative focus centered on criminal sentencing, bail reform, public safety, state fiscal policy, and protections for elderly and vulnerable adults. In the 114th General Assembly (2025–2026), he was appointed vice chair of the House Finance, Ways, and Means Committee.

Notable legislation sponsored by Gillespie during the 112th and 113th General Assemblies includes:

- Safe Seniors Act of 2021 (HB 718): Established stricter criminal penalties and protective measures for offenses involving the abuse, neglect, or financial exploitation of elderly and vulnerable adults, alongside companion measures (HB 628, HB 629, and HB 630) expanding victim services and mandatory reporting requirements.
- Truth in Sentencing (2022 / HB 5 in 2023): Co-sponsored Tennessee's Truth in Sentencing statute requiring individuals convicted of certain violent felonies to serve 100% of their sentences, as well as subsequent legislation requiring Range II sentencing minimums for aggravated kidnapping and aggravated rape.
- Street Racing Penalties (HB 22): Elevated the criminal penalty for illegal drag racing on public roadways from a Class B to a Class A misdemeanor.
- First Responder Line-of-Duty Benefits (HB 549): Extended state death benefits to the families of county deputy jailers killed in the line of duty.

Notable legislation sponsored and enacted by Gillespie during the 114th General Assembly (2025–2026) includes:

- Bail Reform for Violent and Firearm Felonies (HB 33 / 2025): Established a statutory presumption against releasing a defendant on their own personal recognizance when charged with a felony involving the use or display of a firearm or resulting in serious bodily injury or death.
- Charter County Constitutional Officers (HB 307 / Public Chapter 172, 2025): Clarified that the sheriff, register, county clerk, assessor of property, and trustee serve as constitutional officers in counties operating under a charter form of government and specified their statutory duties.
- Memphis Safe Task Force Accountability Act (HB 1484 / 2026): Required the Shelby County District Attorney General's office to submit periodic reports to state legislative leaders, the Tennessee Attorney General, and federal prosecutors when declining to prosecute, dismissing, or entering plea agreements on felony charges originating from federal task force operations in Memphis. The law later became the subject of a constitutional lawsuit filed by District Attorney General Steve Mulroy.
- Temporary Bail Revocation (HB 1980 / 2026): Authorized courts to temporarily revoke a defendant's bond and hold them without bail for up to 10 days pending a revocation hearing if they violate release conditions or are charged with a new offense while out on bond.

In April 2023, during the 113th General Assembly, Gillespie voted with the Republican majority in favor of resolutions to expel two Democratic lawmakers from the House for violating chamber decorum rules during a gun-control protest on the House floor.

=== Committee assignments ===
- 112th General Assembly (2021–2022):
  - Children and Family Affairs Subcommittee
  - Civil Justice Committee
  - Education Administration Committee
  - Finance, Ways, and Means Committee
  - Higher Education Subcommittee
- 113th General Assembly (2023–2024):
  - Criminal Justice Committee (Vice Chair)
  - Education Administration Committee
  - Health Committee
- 114th General Assembly (2025–2026):
  - Finance, Ways, and Means Committee (Vice Chair)
  - Finance, Ways, and Means Subcommittee
  - Health Committee
  - Population Health Subcommittee

== Electoral history ==
2020 Tennessee House of Representatives 97th district Republican primary
Party	Candidate	Votes	%	±%
Republican	John Gillespie	3,628	78.2	
Republican	Brandon Weise	1,009	21.8	
Total votes		4,637	100.0	

2020 Tennessee House of Representatives 97th district general election
Party	Candidate	Votes	%	±%
Republican	John Gillespie	14,712	50.8	
Democratic	Gabby Salinas	14,246	49.2	
Total votes		28,958	100.0	
Republican hold		Swing	{{{swing}}}	

2022 Tennessee House of Representatives 97th district general election
Party	Candidate	Votes	%	±%
Republican	John Gillespie (incumbent)	12,083	56.7	
Democratic	Toniko Harris	9,219	43.3	
Total votes		21,302	100.0	
Republican hold		Swing	{{{swing}}}	

2024 Tennessee House of Representatives 97th district Republican primary
Party	Candidate	Votes	%	±%
Republican	John Gillespie (incumbent)	4,914	95.4	
Republican	Christina Oppenhuizen	236	4.6	
Total votes		5,150	100.0	

Template:Election box write-in

2024 Tennessee House of Representatives 97th district general election
Party	Candidate	Votes	%	±%
Republican	John Gillespie (incumbent)	16,368	51.6	
Democratic	Jesse Huseth	15,292	48.2	
Total votes		31,698	100.0	
Republican hold		Swing	{{{swing}}}	

2026 Tennessee House of Representatives 97th district general election
Party	Candidate	Votes	%	±%
Democratic	Jesse Huseth	13,895	57.0	
Republican	John Gillespie (incumbent)	10,502	43.0	
Total votes		24,397	100.0	
Democratic gain from Republican		Swing	{{{swing}}}	

== Personal life ==
Gillespie is a longtime parishioner of Saint John's Episcopal Church in Memphis. He married Mackenzie Daniel in Memphis in October 2026.

== Electoral history ==
- Gillespie was re-elected in 2022
- Gillespie was re-elected in 2024

== Career ==
Gillespie's professional career began in the world of finance. After working for two local banks in Tennessee, he transitioned into a position where he writes and researches grants for Trezevant Manor,..

In 2023, Gillespie supported a resolution to expel two of three Democratic lawmakers from the legislature for violating decorum rules.

=== Tennessee House of Representatives ===
Running in a contested primary election on August 6, 2020, Gillespie received the Republican Nomination for Representative of the 97th House District when he defeated Brandon Weise 78.3% (3,626 votes) to 21.7% (1,007 votes). Gillespie then faced Gabby Salinas in the General Election on November 3, 2020 which Gillespie won 50.8% (14,712 votes) to 49.2% (14,246 votes).

Legislation sponsored by Gillespie includes:

- House Bill 22 – Increases the penalty for drag racing from a Class B to a Class A misdemeanor.
- House Bill 549 – Allows families of deputy jailers who are killed in the line of duty to receive compensation.
- House Bill 628 – Funds services for victims of abuse, neglect, financial or sexual exploitation of elderly or vulnerable persons as well as educational programs to prevent such abuse, neglect or exploitation.
- House Bill 629 – Requires persons reporting known or suspected cases of abuse, neglect or exploitation of an adult to also notify the district attorney general in all such cases.
- House Bill 630 – Modifies the reporting requirements for the vulnerable adult protective investigative team’s annual report to the chairs of the House and Senate Judiciary Committees
- House Bill 718 – Enacts the “Safe Seniors Act of 2021,” taking dangerous individuals who abuse elderly and vulnerable populations off the streets.

== Activity as member of the 112th General Assembly ==
As a member of the 112th General Assembly, Gillespie is serving on the following committees:

- Member, Children and Family Affairs Subcommittee
- Member, Civil Justice Committee
- Member, Education Administration Committee
- Member, Finance, Ways, and Means Committee
- Member, Higher Education Subcommittee

== Personal life ==
Gillespie, the son of Elizabeth and Trow Gillespie, is a native of Memphis, Tennessee. A graduate of High Point University in North Carolina, he earned a Bachelor of Arts degree in Political Science. He is a longtime parishioner of Saint John's Episcopal Church.
