= Charlie Hatcher =

American politician (born 1958)

Member-elect of the U.S. House of Representatives from Tennessee's 5th district
- Assuming office January 3, 2027
- Succeeding: Andy Ogles

Agriculture Commissioner of Tennessee
- In office January 12, 2019 – September 30, 2025
- Governor: Bill Lee
- Preceded by: Jai Templeton
- Succeeded by: Andy Holt

Personal details
- Born: Charles Woodbridge Hatcher; June 15, 1958 (age 68)
- Party: Republican
- Education: Middle Tennessee State University (BS); University of Tennessee (DVM)
- Website: Campaign website

Charles Woodbridge Hatcher (born June 15, 1958) is an American dairy farmer who is the Republican Party nominee for Tennessee's 5th congressional district in the 2026 general election. He defeated incumbent U.S. representative Andy Ogles in the Republican primary in an upset race. He previously served as the commissioner of the Tennessee Department of Agriculture from 2019 to 2025.

Hatcher graduated with a Bachelor of Science in animal science from Middle Tennessee State University in 1980, and as a Doctor of Veterinary Medicine from University of Tennessee, Knoxville in 1984.

U.S. House of Representatives
Preceded by Andy Ogles	Member of the U.S. House of Representatives from Tennessee's 5th congressional district Taking office 2027	Elect
