= Charles Sargent (politician) =

American politician (1945–2018)

Member of the Tennessee House of Representatives from the 61st district
- In office January 1997 – November 13, 2018

Personal details
- Born: Charles Michael Sargent Jr. February 3, 1945 New York City, New York, U.S.
- Died: November 13, 2018 (aged 73) Franklin, Tennessee, U.S.
- Party: Republican
- Education: Pace University
- Website: cmsargent.com

Military service
- Branch/service: United States Navy
- Years of service: 1965–1967

Charles Michael Sargent Jr. (February 3, 1945 – November 13, 2018) was an American politician and a Republican member of the Tennessee House of Representatives representing District 61 from January 1997 until his death.

== Background ==
Sargent was born in New York City, New York. Sargent attended Pace University in 1964 and 1965. He served in the United States Navy from 1965 to 1967. Sargent was involved with the insurance business and lived in Franklin, Tennessee. He died of cancer while still in office in 2018. He previously chose not to run for re-election, owing to his health.

== Elections ==
- 1996 Sargent was initially elected in the 1996 Republican Primary and the November 5, 1996 General election.
- 1998 Sargent was unopposed for both the August 6, 1998 Republican Primary, winning with 6,205 votes, and won the November 3, 1998 General election, winning with 15,576 votes.
- 2000 Sargent was unopposed for both the August 3, 2000 Republican Primary, winning with 3,686 votes, and the November 7, 2000 General election, winning with 34,218 votes.
- 2002 Sargent was unopposed for both the August 1, 2002 Republican Primary, winning with 8,281 votes, and the November 5, 2002 General election, winning with 20,961 votes.
- 2004 Sargent was unopposed for both the August 5, 2004 Republican Primary, winning with 1,111 votes, and the November 2, 2004 General election, winning with 29,063 votes.
- 2006 Sargent was unopposed for both the August 3, 2006 Republican Primary, winning with 5,015 votes, and the November 7, 2006 General election, winning with 21,341 votes.
- 2008 Sargent was challenged in the August 7, 2008 Republican Primary, winning with 5,073 votes (80.9%), and was unopposed for the November 4, 2008 General election, winning with 33,482 votes.
- 2010 Sargent was unopposed for both the August 5, 2010 Republican Primary, winning with 8,123 votes, and the November 2, 2010 General election, winning with 22,498 votes.
- 2012 Sargent was challenged in the August 2, 2012 Republican Primary, winning with 3,050 votes (61.8%), and was unopposed for the November 6, 2012 General election, winning with 23,727 votes.
