= 1975 United States House of Representatives elections =

There were 4 special elections in 1975 to the United States House of Representatives:

== List of elections ==
Elections are listed by date and district.

District	Incumbent			This race	
District	Member	Party	First elected	Results	Candidates
Louisiana 6	John Rarick	Democratic	1966	Court ordered re-run of the General Election. New member elected January 7, 1975. Republican gain.	▌ ✓ Henson Moore (Republican) 54.14%; ▌Jeff LaCaze (Democratic) 45.86%
California 37	Jerry Pettis	Republican	1966	Incumbent died February 14, 1975. New member elected April 29, 1975. Republican hold.	▌ ✓ Shirley N. Pettis (Republican) 60.50%; ▌Ron Pettis (Democratic) 14.72%; ▌James L. Mayfield (Democratic) 12.68%; ▌Frank Bogert (Republican) 5.43%; Others: ▌Bernard Wahl (American Independent) 1.57%; ▌Joe E. Hubbs (Democratic) 1.26%; ▌Louis Martinez (Republican) 0.99%; ▌Jack H. Harrison (Republican) 0.78%; ▌Bud Mathewson (Republican) 0.63%; ▌Clodeon Adkins (Democratic) 0.56%; ▌C. L. James (Democratic) 0.35%; ▌Richard Welby (Democratic) 0.33%; ▌Robert J. Allenthorp (Republican) 0.21%
Illinois 5	John C. Kluczynski	Democratic	1950	Incumbent died January 26, 1975. New member elected July 8, 1975. Democratic hold.	▌ ✓ John G. Fary (Democratic) 71.92%; ▌Francis X. Lawlor (Republican) 28.08%
Tennessee 5	Richard Fulton	Democratic	1962	Incumbent resigned August 14, 1975, after being elected Mayor of Nashville; New member elected November 25, 1975. Democratic hold.	▌ ✓ Clifford Allen (Democratic) 65.71%; ▌Bob Olsen (Republican) 34.83%
