= Jane Eskind =

American activist and politician

Member of the Tennessee Public Service Commission
- In office January 1981 – January 1987
- Preceded by: Z. D. Atkins
- Succeeded by: Stephen Hewlett

Personal details
- Born: Jane Greenebaum; May 18, 1933 Louisville, Kentucky, U.S.
- Died: August 4, 2016 (aged 83)
- Party: Democratic
- Education: Brandeis University (attended); University of Louisville (BA)

Jane Greenebaum Eskind (May 18, 1933 – August 4, 2016) was an American activist and politician from the state of Tennessee. She served on the Tennessee Public Service Commission, becoming the first woman to win an election to a statewide office in Tennessee.

== Early life and career ==
Eskind was born on May 18, 1933, in Louisville, Kentucky, to Samuel "Bud" and Doni Greenebaum. She graduated from Atherton High School, and then attended Brandeis University before graduating from the University of Louisville. She moved to Nashville, Tennessee, in 1956.

From 1964 to 1969, Eskind worked as a lobbyist for the Tennessee chapter of the League of Women Voters. She left the league to join the Democratic Party over what she saw as a limitation of the league's nonpartisan strategy. Eskind joined the Democratic Women's Club. She was elected and served as the president of the Davidson County Democratic Women in 1973. She served as a representative of Tennessee on the Democratic National Platform Committee in 1972 and 1976, and was elected to the Democratic State Executive Committee in 1974.

== Electoral politics ==
In the 1978 United States Senate elections, Eskind ran for the United States Senate seat representing Tennessee. She won the Democratic Party's primary election to become the Democratic nominee, becoming the first woman to win a statewide primary in Tennessee. She lost the general election to incumbent Howard Baker. In 1980, Eskind won election to the Tennessee Public Service Commission, becoming the first woman to win an election to a statewide office in Tennessee.

Eskind ran for governor of Tennessee in the 1986 election, but lost to Ned McWherter in the Democratic Party's primary election, though finishing ahead of Richard Fulton. In 1987, Eskind ran to represent Tennessee's 5th congressional district in a special election to the United States House of Representatives, but the election was won by Bob Clement. Eskind was elected the chair of the Tennessee Democratic Party in 1994, becoming the first woman to serve in the role.

== Recognition ==
Eskind was the Tennessee Women's Hall of Fame's first inductee and received a lifetime achievement award from the American Civil Liberties Union.

== Personal life ==
Eskind's husband, Richard Eskind, was a stockbroker. They met while she attended Brandeis and he attended Harvard University. The Eskinds married in 1954 and had two children and six grandchildren. Her cousin, Linda Eskind Rebrovick, ran for mayor of Nashville in the 2015 election.

Eskind died on August 4, 2016.

Party political offices
Preceded by Ray Blanton	Democratic nominee for U.S. Senator from Tennessee (Class 2); 1978	Succeeded by Al Gore
