= 1978 Tennessee Proposal 1 =

Referendum to repeal interracial marriage ban

- March 7, 1978
- Elimination of Prohibition of Interracial Marriages.

Results
Choice	Votes	%
Yes	199,742	51.02%
No	191,745	48.98%

Yes
60–70%
50–60%
No
70–80%
60–70%
50–60%

1978 Tennessee Proposal 1 was a proposed amendment to the Constitution of Tennessee to repeal the state's unenforceable ban against interracial marriage. The amendment was symbolic, as the Supreme Court of the United States had ruled such bans to be in violation of the Fourteenth Amendment in Loving v. Virginia in 1967, making the ban unenforceable. Placed on the ballot by the 1977 Tennessee Constitutional Convention, the amendment received the endorsement of Governor Ray Blanton, as well as numerous newspapers throughout the state. With a voter turnout of ~15%, the amendment narrowly passed, with 51.02% of voters casting a ballot in favor.

== Background ==
Tennessee's constitutional ban on interracial marriage dated back to 1870. By 1945, thirty U.S. states had adopted anti-miscegenation laws in statute form or in their state constitutions, including all states in the South. In 1967, the Supreme Court of the United States ruled interracial marriage bans to be in violation of the Equal Protection and Due Process clauses of the Fourteenth Amendment to the United States Constitution, thereby striking down all state laws that had banned such marriages. On August 9, 1977, delegates to the 1977 Tennessee Constitutional Convention voted 85–3 to place an amendment on the ballot to repeal the ban, making it the first amendment approved by the convention.

== Endorsements ==
Yes

State officials

- Ray Blanton, governor of Tennessee (1975–1979) (Democratic)

State legislators

- Victor Ashe, state senator from the 7th district (1975–1984) (Republican)

Newspapers

- The Jackson Sun
- Kingsport Times-News
- Knoxville News Sentinel
- Lebanon Democrat

== Contents and amendment ==
=== Contents ===
The amendment, which was decided by Tennessee voters on March 7, 1978, alongside 12 other amendments referred by the 1977 Tennessee Constitutional Convention, had the following information shown to voters for it:

Proposal 1: Elimination of Prohibition of Interracial Marriages.

Be It Resolved, That Article XI, of the Constitution is hereby amended by deleting therefrom in its entirety Section 14 prohibiting interracial marriages.

For Constitutional Amendment []

Against Constitutional Amendment []

=== Amendment ===
The amendment repealed Article XI, Section 14 of the Tennessee Constitution, which had stated:

Sec. 14 Intermarriage between whites and negros

The intermarriage of white persons with negroes, mulattos, or persons of mixed blood, descended from a negro to the third generation inclusive or their living together as man and wife in this State is prohibited. The legislature shall enforce this section by appropriate legislation.

== Results ==
199,742 people voted in favor (51.02%) and 191,745 (48.98%) voted against.

=== County ===
By county, the highest percentage of votes cast in favor came from Anderson County, with 64.30% in favor, and the lowest came from Pickett County, with 21.38% in favor.

The following table details the results of the referendum by county:

Results by county
County	Yes		No	
County	#	%	#	%
Anderson	4,337	64.30%	2,408	35.70%
Bedford	1,522	45.43%	1,828	54.57%
Benton	517	33.97%	1,005	66.03%
Bledsoe	236	28.57%	590	71.43%
Blount	4,345	51.56%	4,082	48.44%
Bradley	2,362	53.14%	2,083	46.86%
Campbell	658	39.21%	1,020	60.79%
Cannon	324	36.45%	565	63.55%
Carroll	852	41.06%	1,223	58.94%
Carter	1,558	38.76%	2,462	61.24%
Cheatham	617	39.81%	933	60.19%
Chester	378	37.69%	625	62.31%
Claiborne	334	27.18%	895	72.82%
Clay	191	23.64%	617	76.36%
Cocke	944	48.04%	1,021	51.96%
Coffee	2,029	49.45%	2,074	50.55%
Crockett	300	32.68%	618	67.32%
Cumberland	1,947	47.91%	2,117	52.09%
Davidson	30,062	57.52%	22,203	42.48%
Decatur	340	39.04%	531	60.96%
DeKalb	462	40.78%	671	59.22%
Dickson	1,058	39.88%	1,595	60.12%
Dyer	1,021	44.43%	1,277	55.57%
Fayette	632	40.80%	917	59.20%
Fentress	334	33.40%	666	66.60%
Franklin	1,246	45.52%	1,491	54.48%
Gibson	1,677	44.67%	2,077	55.33%
Giles	733	47.35%	815	52.65%
Grainger	280	30.63%	634	69.37%
Greene	2,512	54.80%	2,072	45.20%
Grundy	293	36.08%	519	63.92%
Hamblen	1,777	49.87%	1,786	50.13%
Hamilton	15,119	59.56%	10,267	40.44%
Hancock	110	33.85%	215	66.15%
Hardeman	1,284	49.21%	1,325	50.79%
Hardin	719	49.01%	748	50.99%
Hawkins	1,168	42.17%	1,602	57.83%
Haywood	789	48.35%	843	51.65%
Henderson	600	45.73%	712	54.27%
Henry	1,538	60.60%	1,000	39.40%
Hickman	532	32.11%	1,125	67.89%
Houston	226	38.31%	364	61.69%
Humphreys	561	39.82%	848	60.18%
Jackson	221	29.95%	517	70.05%
Jefferson	1,015	47.85%	1,106	52.15%
Johnson	499	48.92%	521	51.08%
Knox	15,852	51.00%	15,231	49.00%
Lake	145	32.88%	296	67.12%
Lauderdale	661	34.18%	1,273	65.82%
Lawrence	1,054	38.13%	1,710	61.87%
Lewis	430	47.88%	468	52.12%
Lincoln	715	40.40%	1,055	59.60%
Loudon	949	44.28%	1,194	55.72%
McMinn	1,985	55.37%	1,600	44.63%
McNairy	718	44.62%	891	55.38%
Macon	420	42.77%	562	57.23%
Madison	3,033	51.20%	2,891	48.80%
Marion	841	45.91%	991	54.09%
Marshall	1,101	38.81%	1,736	61.19%
Maury	1,975	46.29%	2,292	53.71%
Meigs	331	54.98%	271	45.02%
Monroe	904	40.21%	1,344	59.79%
Montgomery	3,711	56.78%	2,825	43.22%
Moore	138	36.70%	238	63.30%
Morgan	506	42.85%	675	57.15%
Obion	790	39.70%	1,200	60.30%
Overton	398	31.17%	879	68.83%
Perry	200	29.85%	470	70.15%
Pickett	90	21.38%	331	78.62%
Polk	1,812	60.16%	1,200	39.84%
Putnam	1,632	45.57%	1,949	54.43%
Rhea	925	52.65%	832	47.35%
Roane	2,299	50.48%	2,255	49.52%
Robertson	1,013	36.13%	1,791	63.87%
Rutherford	3,534	52.75%	3,166	47.25%
Scott	391	43.98%	498	56.02%
Sequatchie	314	38.72%	497	61.28%
Sevier	1,416	43.91%	1,809	56.09%
Shelby	35,917	55.39%	28,930	44.61%
Smith	410	33.52%	813	66.48%
Stewart	275	41.42%	389	58.58%
Sullivan	5,635	58.42%	4,010	41.58%
Sumner	3,155	48.61%	3,336	51.39%
Tipton	1,224	43.45%	1,593	56.55%
Trousdale	240	40.54%	352	59.46%
Unicoi	590	53.06%	522	46.94%
Union	273	32.16%	576	67.84%
Van Buren	114	29.23%	276	70.77%
Warren	848	38.35%	1,363	61.65%
Washington	4,025	57.81%	2,937	42.19%
Wayne	303	40.84%	439	59.16%
Weakley	774	39.71%	1,175	60.29%
White	582	41.57%	818	58.43%
Williamson	2,933	55.95%	2,309	44.05%
Wilson	1,902	39.82%	2,874	60.18%
Total	199,742	51.02	191,745	48.98

=== Congressional district ===
By congressional district, the highest percentage of votes cast in favor came from the eighth district, with 58.53% in favor, and the lowest came from the fourth district, with 43.63% in favor.

The following table details the results by congressional district:

Results by congressional district
CD	Yes		No	
CD	#	%	#	%
One	21,529	50.99%	20,697	49.01%
Two	25,691	49.28%	26,440	50.72%
Three	29,082	56.86%	22,069	43.14%
Four	23,848	43.63%	30,813	56.37%
Five	31,692	55.97%	24,927	44.03%
Six	27,112	49.01%	28,211	50.99%
Seven	19,645	45.45%	23,576	54.55%
Eight	21,171	58.53%	15,003	41.47%

== Analysis ==
=== Voting patterns ===
The closeness of the vote was viewed as surprising by some newspapers, and ironic by others. With about 15% voter turnout, it had the lowest turnout since a similar 1953 special election where Tennessee voters decided eight constitutional amendments.

== See also ==
- Elections in Tennessee
- 1978 United States Senate election in Tennessee
- 1978 Tennessee gubernatorial election
