= 1986 United States House of Representatives elections in Tennessee =

- November 4, 1986

All 9 Tennessee seats to the United States House of Representatives
| | Majority party | Minority party |
|---|---|---|
| Party | Democratic | Republican |
| Last election | 6 | 3 |
| Seats won | 6 | 3 |
| Seat change | Steady | Steady |
| Popular vote | 636,374 | 448,987 |
| Percentage | 57.58% | 40.62% |
| Swing | ▲2.37% | ▼4.15% |

Democratic hold
Republican hold
Democratic
50–60%
70–80%
80–90%
90–100%
Republican
60–70%
70–80%

The 1986 congressional elections in Tennessee was held on November 4, 1986, to determine who will represent the state of Tennessee in the United States House of Representatives.

Following the 1986 elections, no seats changed hands, leaving the Tennessee delegation at a 6-3 Democratic majority.

== Overview ==
United States House of Representatives elections in Tennessee, 1986
| Party | Votes | Percentage | Seats | +/– |
|---|---|---|---|---|
| Democratic | 636,374 | 57.58% | 6 | — |
| Republican | 448,987 | 40.62% | 3 | — |
| Independents | 19,521 | 1.77% | 0 | — |
| Write-ins | 347 | 0.03% | 0 | — |
| Totals | 1,105,229 | 100.00% | 9 | — |

Popular vote
| Democratic | 57.58% |
| Republican | 40.62% |
| Other | 1.80% |

House seats
| Democratic | 66.67% |
| Republican | 33.33% |

== By district ==
| District | Incumbent | Party | First elected | Result | Candidates |
|---|---|---|---|---|---|
| Tennessee 1 | Jimmy Quillen | Republican | 1962 | Incumbent re-elected. | ▌ ✓ Jimmy Quillen (Republican) 68.9%; ▌John B. Russell (Democratic) 31.1% |
| Tennessee 2 | John Duncan Sr. | Republican | 1964 | Incumbent re-elected. | ▌ ✓ John Duncan Sr. (Republican) 76.2%; ▌John F. Bowen (Democratic) 23.8% |
| Tennessee 3 | Marilyn Lloyd | Democratic | 1974 | Incumbent re-elected. | ▌ ✓ Marilyn Lloyd (Democratic) 53.9%; ▌Jim Golden (Republican) 46.1% |
| Tennessee 4 | Jim Cooper | Democratic | 1982 | Incumbent re-elected. | ▌ ✓ Jim Cooper (Democratic) 100% |
| Tennessee 5 | Bill Boner | Democratic | 1978 | Incumbent re-elected. | ▌ ✓ Bill Boner (Democratic) 57.9%; ▌Terry Holcomb (Republican) 39.9%; ▌Charlie Daniels (Independent) 1.4%; Others: ▌Russell Hancock (Independent) 0.4%; ▌Kenneth W. Bloodworth (Independent) 0.4% |
| Tennessee 6 | Bart Gordon | Democratic | 1984 | Incumbent re-elected. | ▌ ✓ Bart Gordon (Democratic) 76.8%; ▌Fred Vail (Republican) 23.2% |
| Tennessee 7 | Don Sundquist | Republican | 1982 | Incumbent re-elected. | ▌ ✓ Don Sundquist (Republican) 72.3%; ▌M. Lloyd Hiler (Democratic) 27.7% |
| Tennessee 8 | Ed Jones | Democratic | 1969 (special) | Incumbent re-elected. | ▌ ✓ Ed Jones (Democratic) 80.4%; ▌Dan H. Campbell (Republican) 19.6% |
| Tennessee 9 | Harold Ford Sr. | Democratic | 1974 | Incumbent re-elected. | ▌ ✓ Harold Ford Sr. (Democratic) 83.7%; ▌Isaac Richmond (Independent) 16.3% |

== See also ==
- 1986 Tennessee gubernatorial election
- 1986 United States elections
