= 1986 Tennessee gubernatorial election =

- November 4, 1986
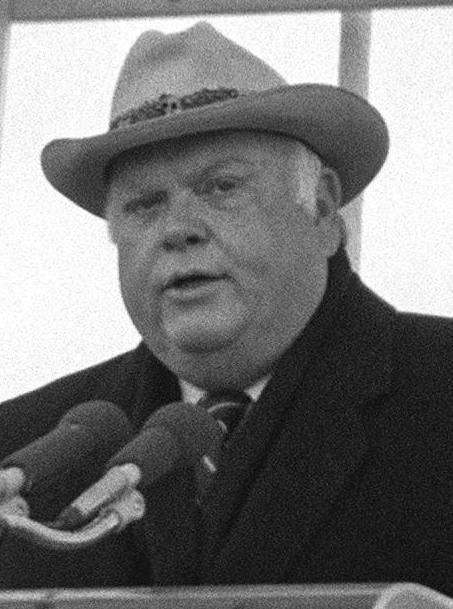

Nominee	Ned McWherter	Winfield Dunn
Party	Democratic	Republican
Popular vote	656,602	553,449
Percentage	54.26%	45.74%
- County results McWherter: 50–60% 60–70% 70–80% 80–90% Dunn: 50–60% 60–70%
Governor before election
Lamar Alexander
Republican
Elected Governor
Ned McWherter
Democratic

The 1986 Tennessee gubernatorial election was held on November 4, 1986, to elect the next governor of Tennessee. Incumbent Republican governor Lamar Alexander was term-limited, leaving the governorship an open seat. Democratic nominee Ned McWherter defeated former Republican governor Winfield Dunn with 54.3% of the vote.

With this win, McWherter flipped the state back into Democratic control, with the state legislature also being controlled by Democrats.

== Background ==
Republican governor Winfield Dunn's term ended in 1975; at the time, the Constitution of Tennessee barred governors from serving consecutive terms. He returned to the private sector, working for several years as the vice president of public relations for the Nashville-based Hospital Corporation of America.

In 1986, Dunn once again ran for governor. He easily defeated Hubert Patty and Charles Vick in the Republican primary, but questions over party unity dogged his campaign. During his first term, Dunn had vetoed a bill calling for the establishment of a medical school at East Tennessee State University, reasoning that the state's three existing medical schools were adequate. Though the legislature overrode his veto, he nevertheless drew the enmity of powerful 1st district congressman Jimmy Quillen, in whose district the school was to be located. Quillen was still smarting over the veto more than a decade later, and withheld his endorsement in 1986. Without Quillen's endorsement, Dunn struggled in East Tennessee (normally a Republican stronghold), and was defeated in the general election by the Democratic nominee, Ned McWherter.

== Primary elections ==
Primary elections were held on August 7, 1986.

=== Democratic primary ===
==== Candidates ====
- Ned McWherter, Speaker of the Tennessee House of Representatives
- Jane Eskind, Public Service Commissioner
- Richard Fulton, Mayor of Nashville
- Joseph L. Crichton
- Bill Jacox

==== Results ====
Democratic primary results
Party	Candidate	Votes	%
Democratic	Ned McWherter	314,449	42.47
Democratic	Jane Eskind	225,551	30.46
Democratic	Richard Fulton	190,016	25.66
Democratic	Joseph L. Crichton	6,582	0.89
Democratic	Bill Jacox	3,817	0.52
Total votes		740,415	100.00

=== Republican primary ===
==== Candidates ====
- Winfield Dunn, former governor
- Hubert David Patty, perennial candidate
- Charles Gordon Vick, perennial candidate

==== Results ====
Republican primary results
Party	Candidate	Votes	%
Republican	Winfield Dunn	222,458	94.23
Republican	Hubert David Patty	7,660	3.25
Republican	Charles Gordon Vick	5,954	2.52
Total votes		236,072	100.00

== General election ==
=== Candidates ===
- Ned McWherter, Democratic
- Winfield Dunn, Republican

=== Results ===
1986 Tennessee gubernatorial election
Party	Candidate	Votes	%	±%
Democratic	Ned McWherter	656,602	54.26%	+13.82%
Republican	Winfield Dunn	553,449	45.74%	−13.82%
Majority		103,153		
Turnout		1,210,339		
Democratic gain from Republican		Swing		

== See also ==
- 1986 United States House of Representatives elections in Tennessee
