= 1950 Tennessee gubernatorial election =

- November 7, 1950
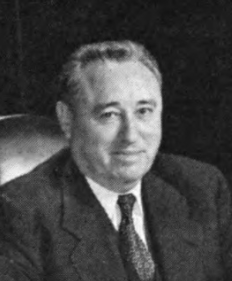

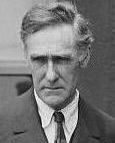
Nominee	Gordon Browning	John Randolph Neal Jr.
Party	Democratic	Independent
Popular vote	184,437	51,757
Percentage	78.09%	21.91%
- County results Browning: 50–60% 60–70% 70–80% 80–90% >90%
Governor before election
Gordon Browning
Democratic
Elected Governor
Gordon Browning
Democratic

The 1950 Tennessee gubernatorial election was held on November 7, 1950, to elect the next governor of Tennessee. Incumbent Democratic governor Gordon Browning defeated Independent John Randolph Neal Jr. with 78.1% of the vote, carrying every county in the state. For the first time since the Civil war, no Republican ran in the general election.

Browning beat back a primary challenge by Nashville attorney and state senator Clifford Allen, winning the nomination 267,855 votes to 208,634.

== Primary elections ==
Primary elections were held on August 3, 1950.

=== Democratic primary ===
==== Candidates ====
- Gordon Browning, incumbent governor
- Clifford Allen, State Senator
- John Randolph Neal Jr., attorney
- Porter Freeman

==== Results ====
Democratic primary results
Party	Candidate	Votes	%
Democratic	Gordon Browning (incumbent)	267,855	55.66%
Democratic	Clifford Allen	208,634	43.35%
Democratic	John Randolph Neal Jr.	2,875	0.60%
Democratic	Porter Freeman	1,907	0.40%
Total votes		481,271	100.00%

== General election ==
=== Candidates ===
- Gordon Browning, Democratic
- John Randolph Neal Jr., Independent

=== Results ===
1950 Tennessee gubernatorial election
Party	Candidate	Votes	%	±%
Democratic	Gordon Browning (incumbent)	184,437	78.09%	
Independent	John Randolph Neal Jr.	51,757	21.91%	
Majority		132,680		
Turnout		236,194		
Democratic hold		Swing		
