= Atherton High School (Kentucky) =

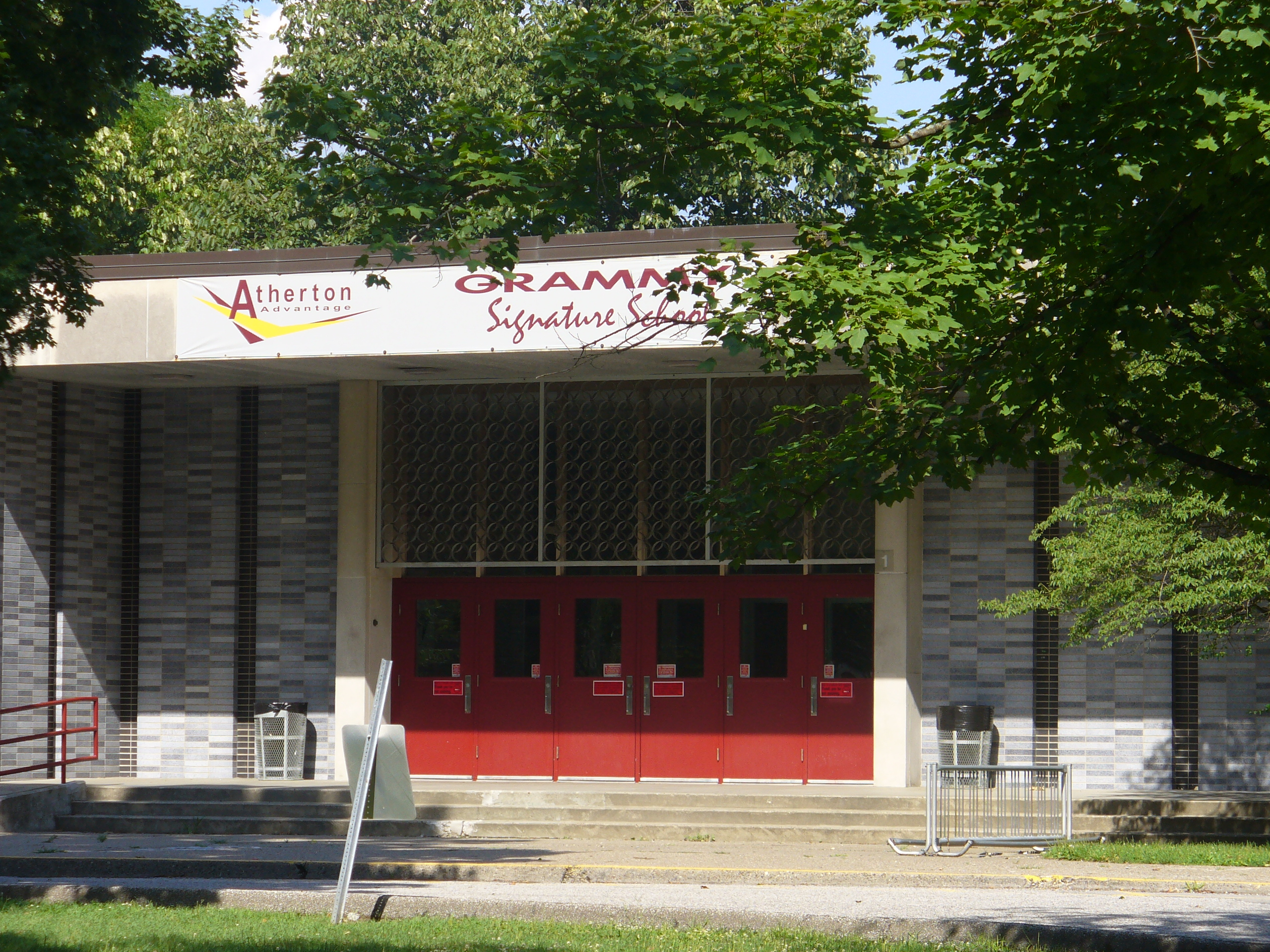

Location
- 3000 Dundee Road; Louisville, Kentucky 40205; United States
- 38°12′46″N 85°41′17″W

Information
- Type: Public
- Motto: "What you do makes a difference."
- Established: 1924
- School district: Jefferson County Public Schools
- Principal: Stephanie Fluhr
- Teaching staff: 80.03 (FTE)
- Grades: 9–12
- Enrollment: 1,496 (2023–2024)
- Student to teacher ratio: 18.69
- Colors: Maroon and gold
- Nickname: Ravens
- Website: www.jefferson.kyschools.us/o/atherton

Atherton High School is a public school in the Highlands district of Louisville, Kentucky, United States, and is part of the Jefferson County Public School district. It opened in 1924 as J.M. Atherton High School for Girls at 1418 Morton Avenue. It is named after John McDougal Atherton, a local businessman and politician who was instrumental in changing Louisville's school system administration from trustees to a board of education. The school became coeducational in 1950.

Atherton moved to its current site in 1962 on the old Ray and Charles Clagett estate and its old premises is now the Jefferson County Traditional Middle School. A new wing was added to the Dundee location in 1992. In 2026, the school added another wing, expanding its freshman hall.

Atherton offers an International Studies Program and an International Baccalaureate (IB) Program. The IB Program is the only one in the city at a public school, and also the only one open to boys (the city's other IB program is at the all-girls' Sacred Heart Academy, a Catholic school). Students also have the option of enrolling in Advanced Placement or Honors classes as well as in the Advanced Placement Program, Exceptional Child Education Program, and English as a Second Language Program.

== Notable alumni ==
- Bill Bishop, author and journalist
- Michelle Clark-Heard, former University of Cincinnati women's basketball head coach
- Jane Eskind, politician
- Andrew Farrell, MLS player
- Billie Starkz, wrestler, Ring Of Honor Television Champion
- Don Francisco, musician, contemporary Christian music
- Sue Grafton, mystery writer
- John R. Hall (sociologist)
- Jack Harlow, rapper
- Oksana Masters, Paralympic rower and cross-country skier; bronze medalist at the 2012 Summer Paralympics and silver medalist at the 2014 Winter Paralympics
- Martha Rofheart (née Jones), actress & writer who grew up at 2120 Portland in the 1920s & 30s, graduated in 1932/33.
- Hunter S. Thompson, journalist and author (graduated from Louisville Male High School)
- Charlie Tyra, first All-American basketball player at the University of Louisville
- Jess Weixler, actress
- Rick Wilson, basketball player, retired
- Jonathan Wolff, music composer
- John Yarmuth, U.S. Representative from Kentucky

== See also ==
- Public schools in Louisville, Kentucky
