= Willis S. Matthews =

US Army major general 1904–1981)

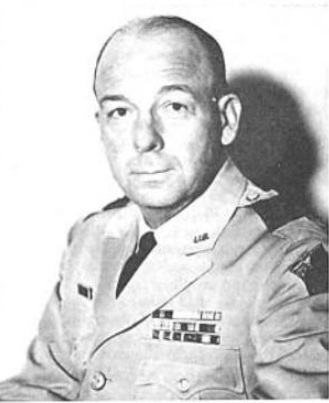
- Matthews as commander of the 1st Infantry Division in 1956
- Born: 18 December 1904; Jackson, Tennessee, US
- Died: 29 March 1981 (aged 76); Washington, DC, US
- Burial place: Arlington National Cemetery
- Alma mater: United States Military Academy; United States Army Command and General Staff College
- Spouse: Eugenia Phillips (m. 1927–1981)
- Children: 1
- Military career
- Service: United States Army
- Service years: 1927–1962
- Rank: Major General
- Service number: 016932
- Unit: US Army Infantry Branch
- Commands: 1st Infantry Division; Military Advisory Assistance Group – Korea
- Wars: World War II; Cold War
- Awards: Army Distinguished Service Medal; Bronze Star Medal
- Other work: Chief of security, 1964 New York World's Fair; Consultant, Research Analysis Corporation

Willis S. Matthews (18 December 1904 – 29 March 1981) was a career officer in the United States Army. A veteran of World War II and the Korean War, he served from 1927 to 1963 and attained the rank of major general. Matthews's commands included the 1st Infantry Division, and his awards included the Army Distinguished Service Medal and Bronze Star Medal.

A native of Jackson, Tennessee, Matthews was raised and educated in Jackson and was a 1923 graduate of Branham and Hughes Military Academy, a military preparatory school in Spring Hill, Tennessee. He graduated from the United States Military Academy at West Point in 1927 and was commissioned in the Infantry Branch. Early assignments included postings to the Philippines, Civilian Conservation Corps duty in California, and member of the West Point faculty.

While serving at the Fort Benning Infantry School, he began a long association with commandant Omar Bradley when he was assigned as Bradley's aide-de-camp. At the beginning of World War II, he served as operations officer (G-3) of the 82nd Airborne Division and 28th Infantry Division during Bradley's command tours of those organizations. During the war, Matthews was a senior staff officer for Sixth U.S. Army, South West Pacific Area's (SWPA) General Headquarters, and XIV Corps, I Corps, and Eighth U.S. Army.

After the war, Matthews served as professor of military science at University of Wisconsin–Madison, then served again as Bradley's aide while Bradley was assigned as Chief of Staff of the United States Army. When Bradley was appointed Chairman of the Joint Chiefs of Staff, Matthews served as his executive officer. After becoming a general officer, he served as assistant division commander of the 4th Infantry Division and deputy chief of staff for operations and training (G-3) at Supreme Headquarters Allied Powers Europe (SHAPE). From January 1956 to April 1957, he commanded the 1st Infantry Division. Matthews commanded Military Advisory Assistance Group – Korea from 1957 to 1959. From 1959 until retiring in 1962, he was deputy commander of First U.S. Army.

After retiring, Matthews was head of security for the 1964 New York World's Fair, followed by work as a consultant for the Research Analysis Corporation. He was a resident of Chevy Chase, Maryland, and died in Washington, DC on 29 March 1981. He was buried at Arlington National Cemetery.

== Early life ==
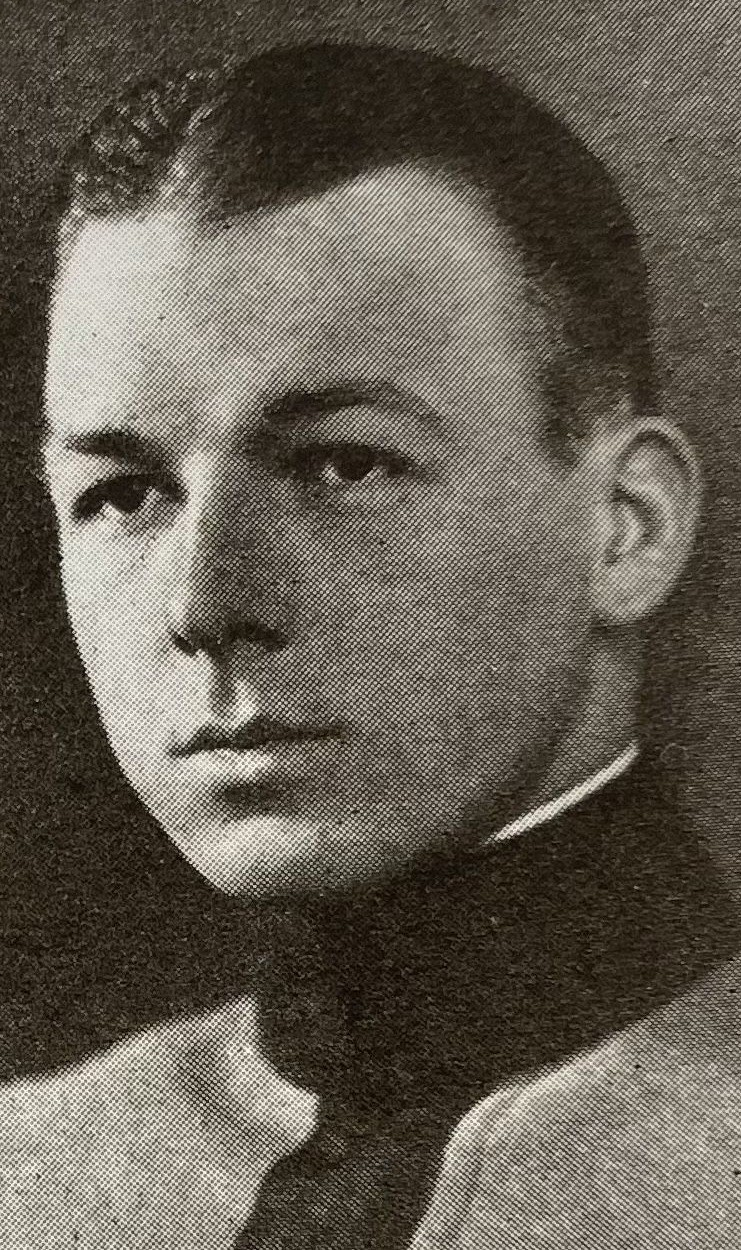
Matthews as a student at Branham and Hughes Military Academy in 1923

Willis Small Matthews was born in Jackson, Tennessee on 18 December 1904, a son of James Smith Matthews and Rebecca Adeline (Small) Matthews. He was raised and educated in Jackson, and was a 1923 graduate of Branham and Hughes Military Academy of Spring Hill, Tennessee. In 1923, he received an appointment to the United States Military Academy from US Representative Lon A. Scott. Matthews graduated in 1927 ranked 199th of 203. Among his classmates who also attained general officer rank were Philip De Witt Ginder and Guy S. Meloy Jr.

== Start of career ==
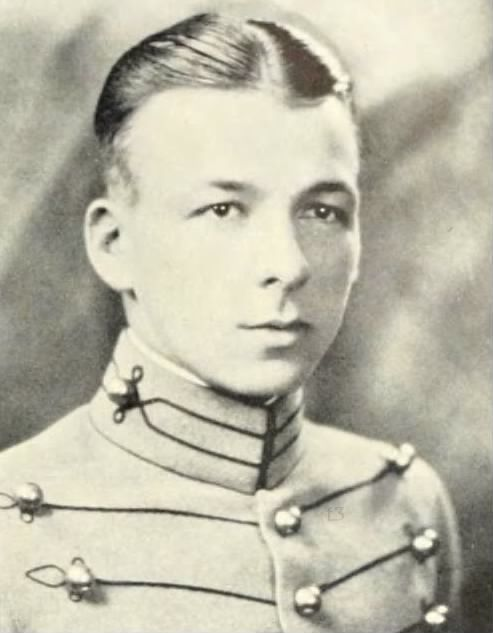
Matthews as a West Point cadet in 1927

Matthews was commissioned as a second lieutenant of Infantry in June 1927 and assigned to the 6th Infantry Regiment at Jefferson Barracks Military Post, Missouri. In June 1929, he was assigned to Fort Sheridan, Illinois as adjutant and supply officer of the 6th Infantry's 3rd Battalion. From August to October 1929, he performed temporary duty at Camp Perry, Ohio, where he helped organize that year's annual marksmanship competition. From October 1929 to February 1930, he was again posted to Jefferson Barracks. In March 1930, he was transferred to the 57th Infantry Regiment and assigned to duty as commander of a company at Fort William McKinley, Philippines.

In April 1932, Matthews returned to the United States, where he performed temporary duty with the Quartermaster Corps at Fort Benning, Georgia. From September 1932 to May 1933, he was a student in the Infantry Officers' Course at Fort Benning. From May to September 1933, Matthews performed duty with the Civilian Conservation Corps in Pinecrest, California. He was then assigned to take the Infantry School's Tank course, which he completed in February 1934. He then joined the 29th Infantry Regiment at Fort Sill, Oklahoma, where he served as the regimental transportation officer. In June 1937, he was assigned to the West Point faculty as an instructor in the Department of Tactics.

== Continued career ==
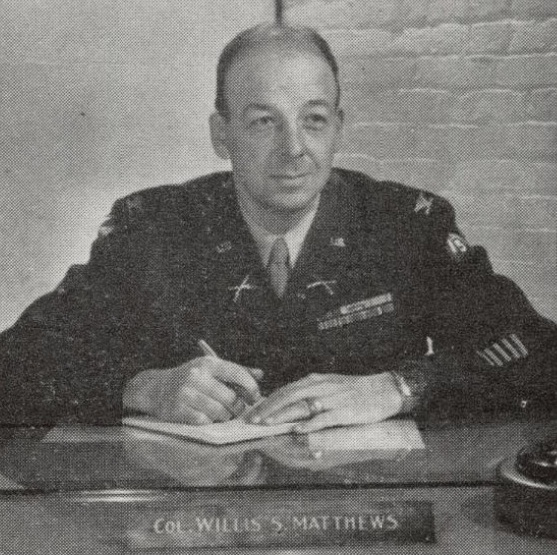
Matthews as a colonel in 1948

With the army expanding in anticipation of American entry into World War II, in June 1940, Matthews was assigned to Camp Custer, Michigan, where he was appointed adjutant of the 2nd Infantry Regiment. In January 1941, he was assigned to take the United States Army Command and General Staff College course at Fort Leavenworth, Kansas. He resumed his post with the 2nd Infantry in February, and remained as adjutant until April. In May, he was assigned to the Infantry School and appointed aide-de-camp to Omar Bradley, the school's commandant. In February 1942, Matthews was posted to Camp Claiborne and assigned as assistant chief of staff for operations (G-3) of the 82nd Airborne Division, which was commanded by Bradley. From June 1942 to February 1943, he was transferred to Camp Livingston, Louisiana and assigned as G-3 of the 28th Infantry Division, which was under Bradley's command.

From February to June 1943, Matthews served in Australia as G-3 for Sixth U.S. Army, a unit of the South West Pacific Area (SWPA). From June 1943 to July 1944, he was assigned to the operations staff for SWPA's General Headquarters. From July 1944 to February 1945, Matthews served as G-3 for XIV Corps, and he took part in the battles of the Bougainville and Luzon campaigns. He served as assistant chief of staff for I Corps in the Philippines from February to April 1945, then was assigned as assistant G-3 for Eighth U.S. Army. He returned to the United States in August 1945, where he completed a course at Fort Knox, Kentucky's Army Recruiting and Support Battalion, which was followed by assignment as professor of military science and tactics at University of Wisconsin–Madison. In June 1948, Matthews was assigned as aide-de-camp to Omar Bradley, now serving as Chief of Staff of the United States Army. In August 1949, Bradley was assigned as Chairman of the Joint Chiefs of Staff, and Matthews was assigned as his executive officer. While in this position, Matthews's wartime experience resulted in the award of equivalent credit for attendance at the Armed Forces Staff College.

== Later career ==
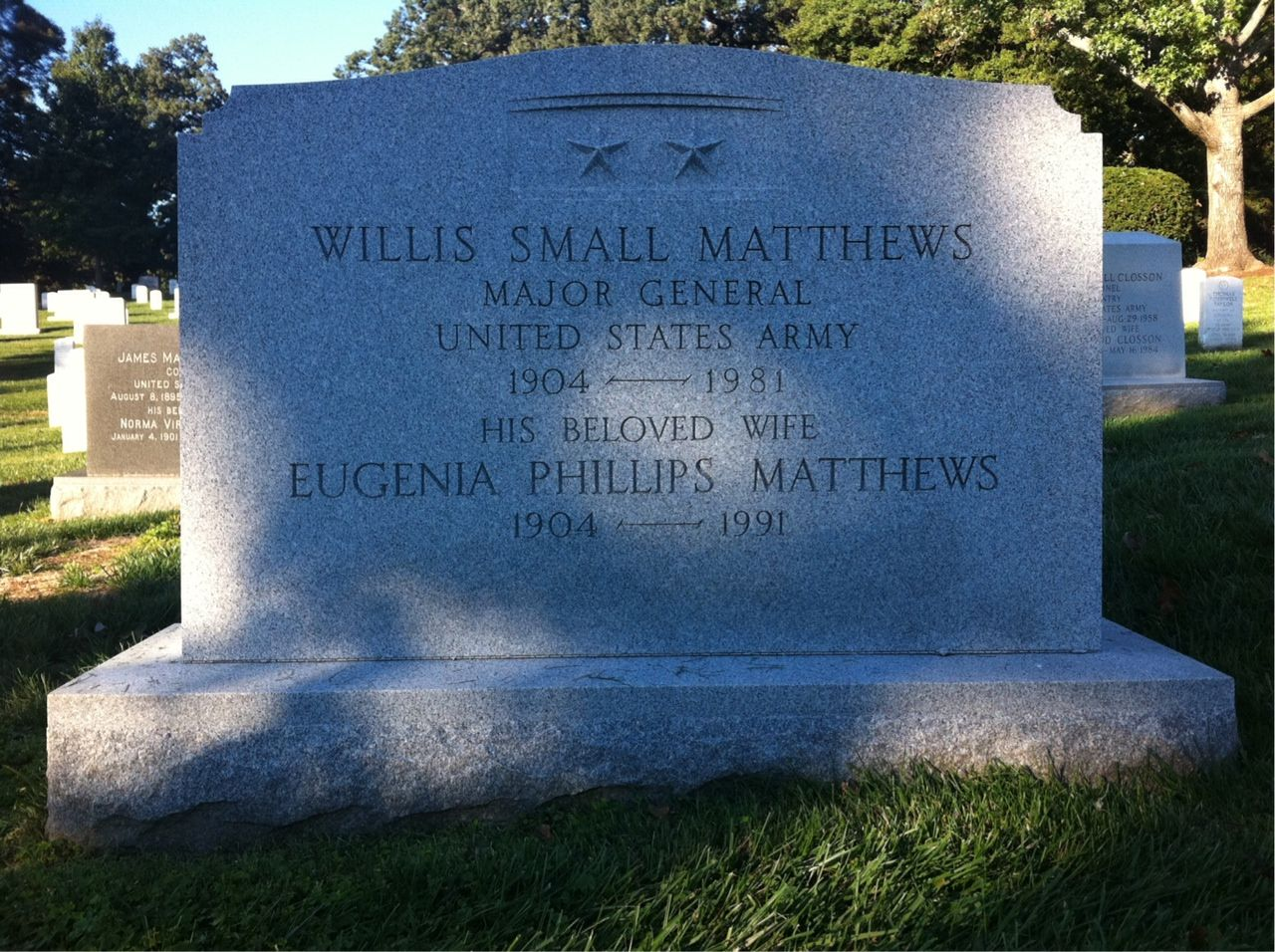
Matthews's grave marker at Arlington National Cemetery

In September 1953, Matthews was appointed assistant division commander of the 4th Infantry Division in West Germany. In 1954, he was assigned as deputy chief of staff for operations and training (G-3) at Supreme Headquarters Allied Powers Europe (SHAPE) at Rocquencourt, France. In January 1956, he was assigned to command the 1st Infantry Division at Fort Riley, Kansas. As commander, he directed the division's reorganization under the Pentomic concept, which was intended to ensure the Cold War deployability of army units in the event of a nuclear strike by the Soviet Union. In April 1957, Matthews was assigned to Cold War duty as commander of Military Advisory Assistance Group – Korea, where he oversaw U.S. assistant to the Republic of Korea Army's post-Korean War organization, training, and equipping. In 1959, he returned to the United States and was appointed as First U.S. Army's deputy commander for reserve affairs. Matthews continued in this role until retiring in December 1962.

After leaving the army, Matthews was appointed head of security for the 1964 New York World's Fair. From 1965 to 1975, he was a consultant for the Research Analysis Corporation of McLean, Virginia, an army-funded enterprise that conducted operations research and data analysis in order to identify issues that hindered mission accomplishment and develop solutions. In retirement, he resided in Chevy Chase, Maryland. Matthews attained the 32nd degree of Scottish Rite Masonry and was a member of the Army and Navy Club of Washington, the West Point Society of Washington, and the University Club of New York. He died on 29 March 1981 after experiencing a heart attack while walking in Washington, D.C. Matthews was buried at Arlington National Cemetery.

== Dates of rank ==
- Second Lieutenant, 14 June 1927
- First Lieutenant, 11 September 1933
- Captain, 14 June 1937
- Major (Army of the United States), 31 January 1941
- Lieutenant Colonel (Army of the United States), 1 February 1942
- Colonel (Army of the United States), 18 October 1943
- Major, 14 June 1944
- Lieutenant Colonel, 15 July 1948
- Colonel, 23 March 1951
- Brigadier General, 28 April 1952
- Major General, 12 April 1955
- Major General (Retired), 31 December 1962
