= 1978 United States Senate election in Tennessee =

- November 7, 1978
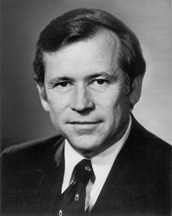

Nominee	Howard Baker	Jane Eskind
Party	Republican	Democratic
Popular vote	642,644	466,228
Percentage	55.54%	40.30%
- County results Baker: 50–60% 60–70% 70–80% Eskind: 50–60% 60–70%
U.S. senator before election
Howard Baker
Republican
Elected U.S. Senator
Howard Baker
Republican

The 1978 United States Senate election in Tennessee took place on November 7, 1978, to elect the U.S. Senator from the state of Tennessee. Two-term popular incumbent Republican U.S. Senator, Howard Baker, who had served as United States Senate Minority Leader since 1977, won re-election over first-time candidate and Democratic Party activist Jane Eskind.

== Republican primary ==
Candidates:

- Incumbent United States Senator and Senate Minority Leader Howard Baker
- J. Durelle Boles
- Harvey Howard
- Hubert David Patty
- Dayton Seiler
- Francis Trapp

Baker easily won the August 3 primary:

Republican primary results
Party	Candidate	Votes	%
Republican	Howard Baker (incumbent)	205,680	83.44%
Republican	Harvey Howard	21,154	8.58%
Republican	James Boles	8,899	3.61%
Republican	Hubert Patty	3,941	1.60%
Republican	Dayton Seiler	3,831	1.55%
Republican	Francis Trapp	2,994	1.22%
Total votes		246,499	100.00%

== Democratic primary ==
Candidates:

- Jame Boyd
- Walter Bradley
- Former State Senate Majority Leader Bill Bruce
- Jane Eskind
- James Foster
- Douglas L. Heinsohn
- J. D. Lee
- Virginia Nyabongo
- Charles Gordon Vick

In an open primary on August 3, Eskind defeated eight other candidates:

Democratic primary results
Party	Candidate	Votes	%
Democratic	Jane Eskind	196,156	34.52%
Democratic	Bill Bruce	170,795	30.06%
Democratic	J.D. Lee	89,939	15.83%
Democratic	James Boyd	48,458	8.53%
Democratic	Walter Bradley	22,130	3.90%
Democratic	Douglas Heinsohn	17,787	3.13%
Democratic	James Foster	10,671	1.88%
Democratic	Virginia Nyabongo	7,682	1.35%
Democratic	Charles Vick	4,414	0.78%
Write-ins	Write-in	147	0.03%
Total votes		568,179	100.00%

== General election ==
Baker won with a 15-point margin in the general election, held on November 7:

General election results
Party	Candidate	Votes	%
Republican	Howard Baker (incumbent)	642,644	55.54%
Democratic	Jane Eskind	466,228	40.30%
Independent	Thomas J. Anderson	45,908	3.97%
Independent	Fern L. Keasler	2,243	0.19%
Republican hold			

=== By county ===
County	Howard Baker, Jr. Republican		Jane Eskind Democratic		Others Independent		Total votes
County	%	#	%	#	%	#	Total votes
Anderson	62.9%	13,098	32.5%	6,777	4.6%	949	20,824
Bedford	51.0%	3,730	46.2%	3,384	2.8%	203	7,317
Benton	47.0%	2,319	50.0%	2,465	2.9%	145	4,929
Bledsoe	53.5%	1,537	42.1%	1,211	4.4%	127	2,875
Blount	62.7%	13,751	31.4%	6,891	6.0%	1,306	21,948
Bradley	59.3%	7,507	32.3%	4,091	8.4%	1,061	12,659
Campbell	55.8%	4,019	38.8%	2,792	5.4%	388	7,199
Cannon	51.2%	1,476	46.1%	1,330	2.7%	77	2,883
Carroll	56.5%	5,057	40.7%	3,645	2.8%	254	8,956
Carter	66.3%	8,320	28.3%	3,554	5.4%	679	12,553
Cheatham	49.1%	2,359	46.8%	2,248	4.2%	200	4,807
Chester	55.3%	2,054	42.5%	1,580	2.2%	81	3,715
Claiborne	55.5%	2,796	38.3%	1,931	6.2%	313	5,040
Clay	52.6%	1,223	45.0%	1,046	2.4%	56	2,325
Cocke	60.2%	3,895	32.4%	2,096	7.5%	483	6,474
Coffee	52.6%	5,455	43.5%	4,517	3.9%	400	10,372
Crockett	52.7%	2,054	41.6%	1,622	5.7%	223	3,899
Cumberland	54.7%	4,375	36.9%	2,952	8.4%	671	7,998
Davidson	52.9%	69,163	44.2%	57,791	2.9%	3,805	130,759
Decatur	54.5%	2,001	42.9%	1,577	2.6%	96	3,674
DeKalb	48.3%	1,741	48.7%	1,754	3.0%	107	3,602
Dickson	47.1%	3,938	49.9%	4,171	3.1%	257	8,366
Dyer	47.5%	3,621	38.9%	2,968	13.7%	1,042	7,631
Fayette	44.9%	2,366	51.7%	2,726	3.4%	181	5,273
Fentress	53.2%	1,627	42.1%	1,289	4.7%	143	3,059
Franklin	46.9%	3,520	49.2%	3,692	3.9%	294	7,506
Gibson	52.4%	6,782	45.0%	5,830	2.6%	342	12,954
Giles	42.3%	2,188	51.8%	2,682	5.9%	308	5,178
Grainger	61.8%	2,472	32.4%	1,295	5.8%	233	4,000
Greene	63.0%	8,025	31.8%	4,042	5.2%	663	12,730
Grundy	40.3%	994	56.2%	1,384	3.5%	86	2,464
Hamblen	60.0%	7,714	35.6%	4,574	4.4%	570	12,858
Hamilton	55.7%	35,649	37.5%	23,987	6.9%	4,405	64,041
Hancock	66.7%	1,019	31.3%	478	2.0%	30	1,527
Hardeman	47.3%	2,465	48.8%	2,542	3.9%	201	5,208
Hardin	59.2%	3,290	38.4%	2,135	2.3%	129	5,554
Hawkins	61.9%	6,261	34.8%	3,524	3.3%	336	10,121
Haywood	47.6%	2,317	46.8%	2,281	5.6%	274	4,872
Henderson	64.6%	3,958	33.2%	2,034	2.3%	138	6,130
Henry	49.4%	3,661	45.6%	3,380	5.1%	375	7,416
Hickman	43.8%	1,860	51.1%	2,170	5.2%	219	4,249
Houston	38.1%	720	59.0%	1,116	3.0%	56	1,892
Humphreys	43.3%	2,125	53.0%	2,602	3.7%	183	4,910
Jackson	39.5%	1,068	57.6%	1,557	2.9%	79	2,704
Jefferson	61.4%	4,975	30.8%	2,497	7.8%	629	8,101
Johnson	77.5%	2,690	20.3%	705	2.2%	77	3,472
Knox	62.6%	57,348	31.2%	28,612	6.1%	5,625	91,585
Lake	39.4%	582	57.9%	855	2.7%	40	1,477
Lauderdale	43.5%	2,417	51.8%	2,878	4.7%	262	5,557
Lawrence	58.4%	5,846	39.2%	3,923	2.4%	236	10,005
Lewis	44.5%	1,099	51.4%	1,270	4.1%	102	2,471
Lincoln	44.5%	2,266	53.0%	2,702	2.5%	129	5,097
Loudon	60.4%	4,878	33.0%	2,664	6.6%	531	8,073
Macon	66.8%	2,179	31.2%	1,018	1.9%	63	3,260
Madison	57.1%	11,174	39.4%	7,704	3.5%	677	19,555
Marion	49.9%	2,932	46.2%	2,712	3.9%	227	5,871
Marshall	49.9%	2,674	46.0%	2,463	4.2%	223	5,360
Maury	62.7%	7,459	33.7%	4,006	3.6%	431	11,896
McMinn	62.1%	6,159	35.0%	3,467	3.0%	293	9,919
McNairy	56.6%	3,734	41.6%	2,744	1.9%	124	6,602
Meigs	54.6%	1,076	41.9%	825	3.5%	68	1,969
Monroe	57.4%	5,178	40.5%	3,651	2.2%	195	9,024
Montgomery	53.2%	8,089	43.7%	6,645	3.2%	481	15,215
Moore	51.4%	579	45.3%	510	3.3%	37	1,126
Morgan	49.6%	2,037	44.5%	1,827	5.8%	240	4,104
Obion	44.9%	3,082	49.4%	3,385	5.7%	390	6,857
Overton	46.5%	1,928	50.4%	2,087	3.1%	127	4,142
Perry	47.0%	909	50.7%	981	2.3%	45	1,935
Pickett	60.8%	940	37.7%	583	1.5%	23	1,546
Polk	47.0%	1,744	49.8%	1,847	3.2%	119	3,710
Putnam	55.4%	6,801	42.0%	5,159	2.6%	324	12,284
Rhea	55.7%	2,820	39.5%	2,002	4.8%	245	5,067
Roane	60.2%	8,474	34.6%	4,873	5.2%	727	14,074
Robertson	46.4%	3,870	50.6%	4,224	3.0%	250	8,344
Rutherford	56.2%	10,841	39.9%	7,697	4.0%	765	19,303
Scott	66.3%	2,215	29.6%	988	4.2%	140	3,343
Sequatchie	47.9%	993	46.3%	958	5.8%	120	2,071
Sevier	60.7%	6,078	26.5%	2,659	12.8%	1,279	10,016
Shelby	52.2%	103,985	45.6%	90,744	2.2%	4,363	199,092
Smith	45.9%	1,703	51.4%	1,907	2.7%	101	3,711
Stewart	42.8%	1,015	55.0%	1,306	2.2%	52	2,373
Sullivan	62.2%	21,909	33.5%	11,800	4.4%	1,542	35,251
Sumner	56.5%	10,528	40.2%	7,502	3.3%	620	18,650
Tipton	52.3%	3,726	42.9%	3,057	4.7%	335	7,118
Trousdale	44.0%	663	54.2%	817	1.9%	28	1,508
Unicoi	66.3%	2,823	28.7%	1,222	4.9%	210	4,255
Union	50.9%	1,770	44.1%	1,534	5.0%	174	3,478
Van Buren	47.0%	579	49.6%	611	3.4%	42	1,232
Warren	47.7%	3,449	48.1%	3,476	4.2%	307	7,232
Washington	64.4%	13,611	30.4%	6,428	5.1%	1,083	21,122
Wayne	69.3%	2,793	29.7%	1,198	0.9%	38	4,029
Weakley	41.0%	3,032	48.0%	3,547	11.0%	809	7,388
White	54.7%	2,294	41.0%	1,720	4.3%	179	4,193
Williamson	65.6%	10,182	30.9%	4,800	3.4%	529	15,511
Wilson	53.1%	6,946	43.8%	5,725	3.0%	398	13,069
Total	55.5%	642,644	40.3%	466,228	4.2%	48,222	1,157,094

== See also ==
- 1978 United States Senate elections
- 1978 Tennessee gubernatorial election
- 1978 Tennessee Proposal 1
