= J. Carlton Loser =

American politician (1892–1984)

Joseph Carlton Loser
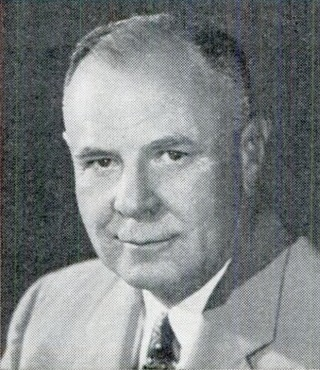
- From 1957's Pocket Congressional Directory of the Eighty-Fifth Congress

Member of the U.S. House of Representatives from Tennessee's 5th district
- In office January 3, 1957 – January 3, 1963
- Preceded by: Percy Priest
- Succeeded by: Richard Fulton

Personal details
- Born: October 1, 1892 Davidson County, Tennessee, U.S.
- Died: July 31, 1984 (aged 91) Nashville, Tennessee, U.S.
- Party: Democratic
- Education: Cumberland University
- Profession: Attorney

Military service
- Allegiance: United States of America
- Branch/service: United States Coast Guard Reserve
- Years of service: 1944

Joseph Carlton Loser (October 1, 1892 – July 31, 1984) was an American politician and a United States representative from Tennessee.

== Biography ==
Loser (pronounced "low-ser") was born in Davidson County, Tennessee, son of Henry James and Willie May McConnico Loser. He attended public schools and the former YMCA Law School (now Nashville School of Law). He was secretary to the mayor of Nashville from 1917 to 1920 and was admitted to the bar in 1922. In 1923 he completed the requirements for the LL. B. degree at Cumberland University in Lebanon, Tennessee.

== Career ==
In 1923 Loser became assistant city attorney for Nashville, and in 1929 he became an assistant district attorney. He became district attorney for the former 10th Circuit, a position he held from 1934 until 1956. He was a delegate to the Democratic National Convention in 1944, 1956, and 1960. He was a member of the United States Coast Guard Reserve in 1944; a presidential elector in 1956; and secretary of the Democratic Executive Committee of Tennessee from 1954 to 1958.

In 1956, 5th District Congressman Percy Priest died a month before the election. A special primary was held to replace Priest on the ballot, and Loser won the nomination. This was tantamount to victory a month later, as no Republican had been elected to Congress from Nashville since Reconstruction. He was re-elected in 1958 and 1960, and served from January 3, 1957, to January 3, 1963.

In August 1962 Loser had seemingly been renominated for a fourth term. However, an investigation into the primary election revealed serious irregularities. Loser's major opponent in this contest was Richard Fulton. However, it was largely the instigation of a minor candidate, iron worker and labor union activist Raymond Love, that caused a re-examination of the primary by the Nashville Tennessean. The Tennessean ran stories on its front page indicating a pattern of serious voter fraud, and a lawsuit was filed. The number of votes in question would not have in any event been adequate to have caused the election of Love, but could possibly have been enough to have thrown the election to Fulton. Love, stating that his only desire was one for a clean, honest election in any case, withdrew from the primary, which was rerun by court order. In the second primary, conducted under close scrutiny, Fulton defeated Loser decisively and went on to be elected that fall and to seven subsequent terms.

Loser withdrew from public life after his defeat.

== Personal life and death ==
Loser's father-in-law, William Gupton, served as the mayor of Nashville from 1917 to 1921.

Loser died on July 31, 1984 (age 91 years, 304 days) in Nashville. He is interred at Woodlawn Memorial Park, Nashville, Tennessee.

U.S. House of Representatives
Preceded by Percy Priest	Member of the U.S. House of Representatives from Tennessee's 5th congressional district 1957–1963	Succeeded by Richard Fulton
