= Thetus W. Sims =

American politician (1852–1939)

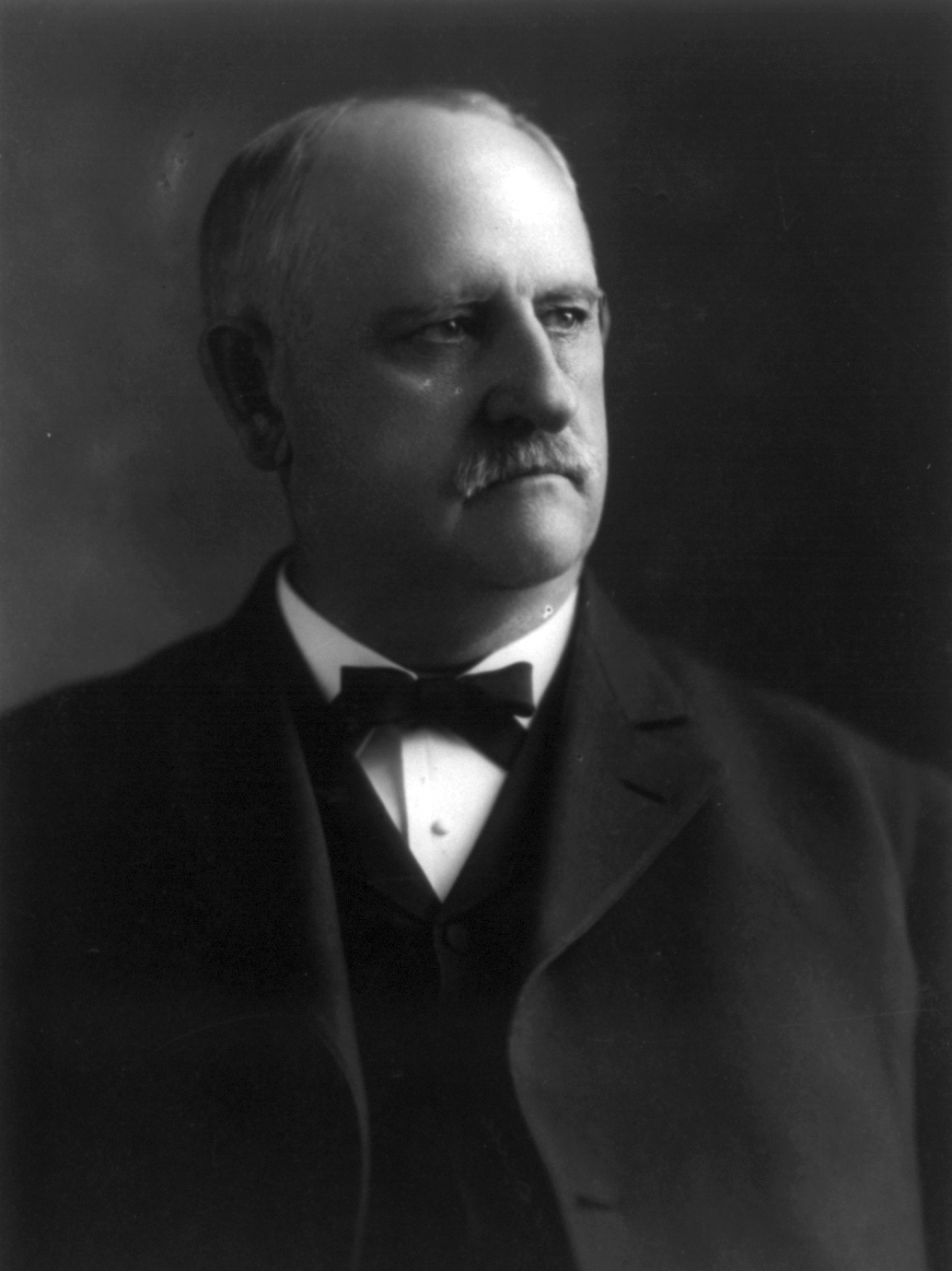

Member of the U.S. House of Representatives from Tennessee's 8th district
- In office March 4, 1897 – March 3, 1921
- Preceded by: John E. McCall
- Succeeded by: Lon A. Scott

Personal details
- Born: April 25, 1852 Wayne County, Tennessee, U.S.
- Died: December 17, 1939 (aged 87) Washington, D.C., U.S.
- Resting place: Rock Creek Cemetery; Washington, D.C., U.S.
- Party: Democratic Party (United States)
- Spouse: Nannie Kitrell Sims
- Children: Edna Sims; Erskine Kent Sims; Tom Sims; Elizabeth Sims; Marie Sims; Paul Sims; Enid Sims
- Education: Cumberland University
- Profession: Lawyer

Thetus Willrette Sims (April 25, 1852 – December 17, 1939) was an American lawyer and politician who served several terms in the United States House of Representatives for the 8th congressional district of Tennessee. He was a Democrat.

== Biography ==
Sims was born on April 25, 1852, near Waynesboro, Tennessee, in Wayne County son of George Washington and Sarah Jane Whitson Sims. He attended a private school at Martin Mills and moved with his parents to Savannah, Tennessee, in Hardin County in 1862 during the Civil War.

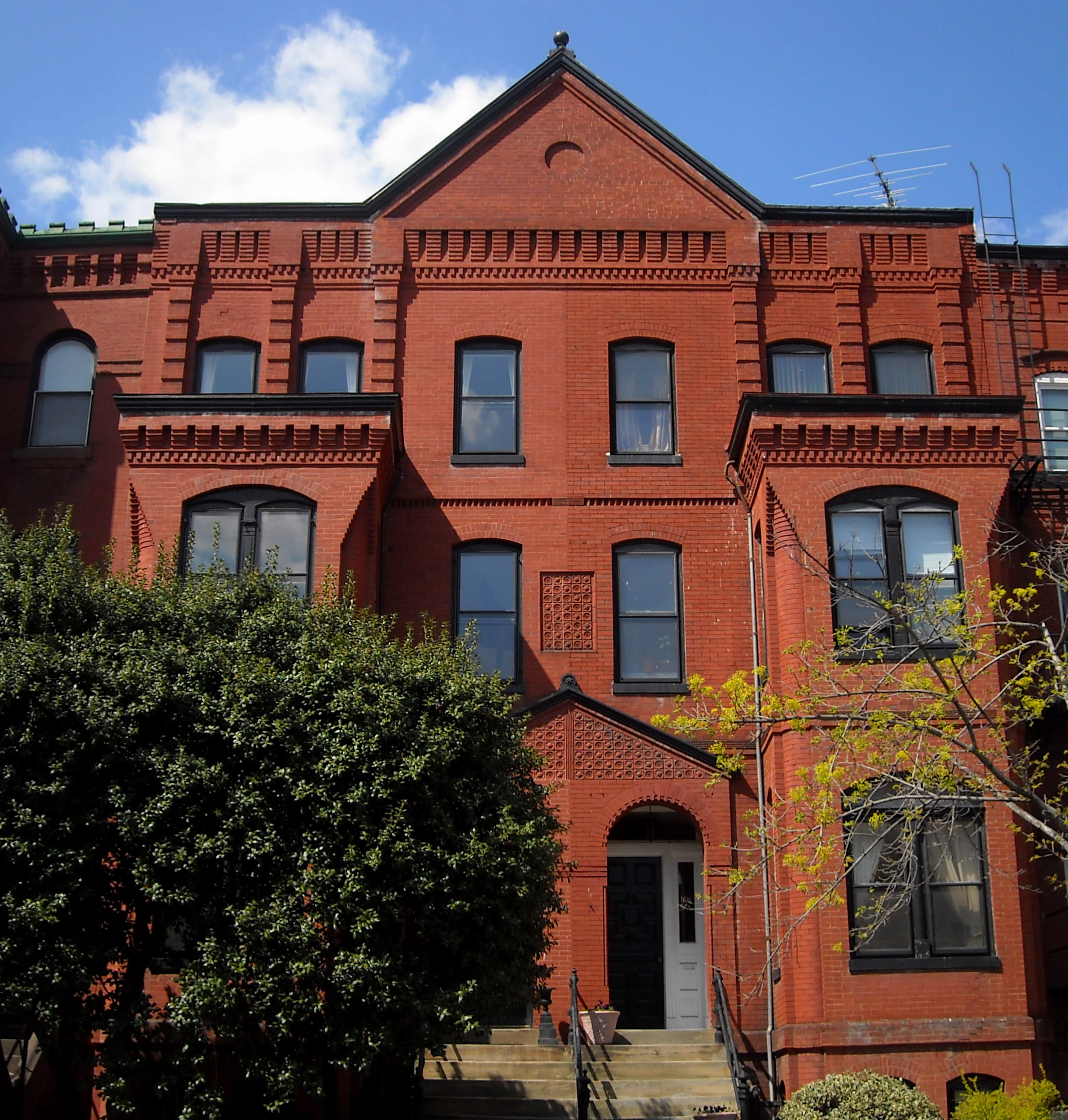
Thetus W. Sims' former residence in Washington, D.C.

Sims attended Savannah College in Tennessee and graduated from Cumberland School of Law at Cumberland University in Lebanon, Tennessee, in June 1876. He was admitted to the bar the same year. He married Nannie Kitrell on December 26, 1877, and they had seven children, Edna, Erskine, Tom, Elizabeth, Marie, Paul, and Enid.

== Career ==
Sims commenced practice in Linden, Tennessee, in Perry County. He was the superintendent of public instruction for Perry County, Tennessee from 1882 to 1884.

Sims was elected to the House in the fall of 1896 as a Democrat. He was reelected to the eleven succeeding Congresses.

- 1897–1899 - 55th Congress Freshman term in the House.
- 1911–1913 - 62nd Congress He was the chairman of the United States House Committee on War Claims.
- 1917–1919 - 65th Congress He was the chairman of the United States House Committee on Interstate and Foreign Commerce.
- 1920 - He failed to win the election in 1920 for the 67th Congress (1921–1923).

His tenure in the House lasted for 12 terms in office from March 4, 1897, to March 3, 1921.

He was an important advocate for the nineteenth amendment which gave women the right to vote. Tennessee was also the last state to ratify the nineteenth amendment.

He pushed for the Sims Act, which forbade interstate transportation of fight films, primarily boxing after the Johnson v Flynn fight in 1912. The act was known as the first time Congress took censorship action in regards to films and remained on the book until 1940.

Returning to Lexington, Tennessee, in Henderson County, Sims resumed the practice of law for a few years. He retired from active business pursuits in 1930 shortly after the beginning of the Great Depression and returned to Washington, D.C.

== Death ==
Sims died on December 17, 1939 (aged 87) In Washington, D.C. He is interred at Rock Creek Cemetery in Washington, D.C. He was the father-in-law of politician Louis Brownlow.

U.S. House of Representatives
Preceded by John E. McCall	Member of the U.S. House of Representatives from Tennessee's 8th congressional district 1897-1921	Succeeded by Lon A. Scott
