= Beverly Briley =

American mayor

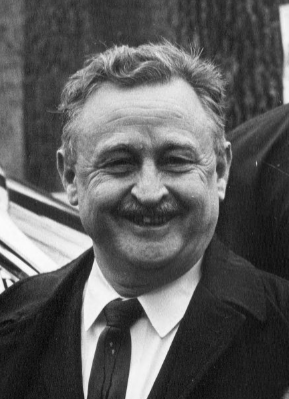

1st Mayor of Metropolitan Nashville
- In office 1963–1975
- Preceded by: Ben West (as mayor of Nashville)
- Succeeded by: Richard Fulton

42nd President of the National League of Cities
- In office 1969
- Preceded by: James Tate
- Succeeded by: Frank Curran

Personal details
- Born: January 11, 1914 Nashville, Tennessee, U.S.
- Died: September 14, 1980 (aged 66) Nashville, Tennessee, U.S.
- Party: Democratic
- Education: Vanderbilt University; Cumberland Law School

Clifton Beverly Briley (January 11, 1914 – September 14, 1980) was an American attorney and politician, the first mayor of the newly consolidated metropolitan government of Nashville and Davidson County in Tennessee. Elected to the mayor's position in 1962 as a Democrat, Briley served three terms from 1963 to 1975; he was prevented by term limits from running again. He had previously served as county judge (chief executive) of Davidson County for several terms, from 1950 to 1963.

== Early life ==
Briley was born in West Nashville, Tennessee in 1914. Attending local schools, he became involved in Scouting as a boy and attained the rank of Eagle Scout. He attended Vanderbilt University before transferring to Cumberland University's law school (now the Cumberland Law School at Samford University), graduating in 1932. He was admitted to the bar in 1932.

== Career ==
Briley began practicing in 1932. Briley served in the U.S. Navy during World War II as a quartermaster aboard the USS David Taylor. After the war, he ran a successful campaign for county judge (chief executive) of Davidson County in 1950, serving until 1963.

Briley was a champion of metropolitan government and supported the merger of Nashville and Davidson County government. In 1963 he won election against Davidson County tax assessor Clifford Allen, another longtime Nashville politician, and became the first mayor of what is known as Metro Nashville. In 1966, his main opponent was Ben West, the last pre-consolidation mayor of Nashville. Briley defeated West in a runoff. Briley was reelected in 1971, also in a runoff. He was prevented by term limits from running again in 1975. He remained active in Nashville politics until his death five years later. Altogether, he served as chief executive of Davidson County and of Nashville for 25 years.

Briley took a fairly progressive position on the Civil Rights Movement, an important question for mayors of Southern cities at the time. He readily cooperated with black leaders and is generally credited with helping smooth the transition away from racial segregation in Nashville. Public schools and lunch counters had already been desegregated by the time he took office. In 1965, Briley described the Ku Klux Klan as "merchants of hate" and said they were "not welcome" in Nashville.

In 1969, Briley served as the president of the National League of Cities.

On other issues, he was a conservative Democrat; in 1972 he was the area leader of "Democrats for Nixon," in an effort to strengthen southern support for Republican national candidates. That year, Nixon became the first Republican presidential candidate to carry Davidson County since the Reconstruction era. Most Republicans had been disenfranchised in Tennessee and other Southern states as Southern Democrats passed new constitutions after the Civil War to suppress black voting by raising barriers to voter registration.

== Personal life and death ==
Briley married Dorothy Gordon in 1934. They had two children together, Cliff and Diane. He was an alcoholic. His grandson David Briley was the Mayor of Nashville after the resignation of Megan Barry.

Briley died of bladder cancer on September 14, 1980, at the Vanderbilt University Hospital in Nashville at the age of 66, just months after the death of his wife. His funeral was held at the Inglewood Baptist Church, and he was buried at Spring Hill Cemetery in Nashville.

== Legacy and honors ==
Briley Parkway, a major beltway thoroughfare which runs by the Grand Ole Opry House and around much of the city, was named in his honor.

The city-owned Beverly Briley Building, a major component of Nashville's redesigned Public Square, was named for him.

His grandson, Rob Briley, was a politician who formerly represented the 52nd House District, a Nashville district, in the state legislature. He also served as the Democratic Majority Floor Leader. Another grandson, David Briley, served as mayor of Nashville.

Political offices
Preceded by Ben West	Mayor of Nashville, Tennessee; 1963—1975	Succeeded by Richard Fulton
