= Lon A. Scott =

American politician

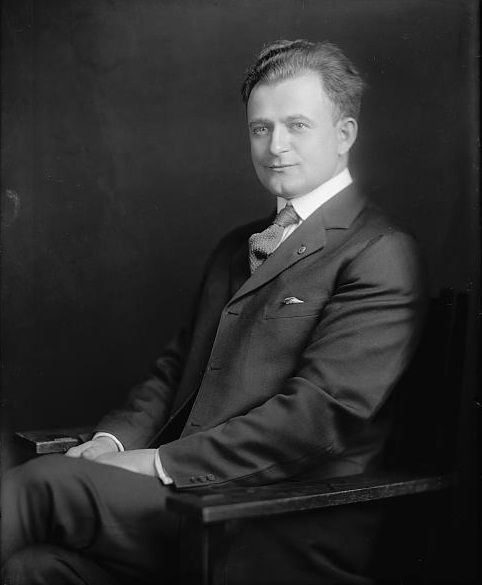

Member of the U.S. House of Representatives from Tennessee's 8th district
- In office March 4, 1921 – March 3, 1923
- Preceded by: Thetus W. Sims
- Succeeded by: Gordon Browning

Personal details
- Born: Lon Allen Scott; September 25, 1888 Wayne County, Tennessee, U.S.
- Died: February 11, 1931 (aged 42) Savannah, Tennessee, U.S.
- Party: Republican
- Parents: Daniel Egan Scott (father); Mattie G. Cash (mother)
- Education: Cumberland University

Military service
- Allegiance: United States
- Branch/service: United States Army
- Rank: Lieutenant
- Battles/wars: World War I

Lon Allen Scott (September 25, 1888 – February 11, 1931) was an American politician who served as a United States representative from Tennessee as a Republican.

== Biography ==
Lon Allen Scott was born on a farm near Cypress Inn in Wayne County, Tennessee to Mattie G. Cash and Daniel Egan Scott on September 25, 1888. His family moved to Savannah, Tennessee in Hardin County and he attended the public schools and Savannah Tennessee Institute. In 1915 he graduated from the law department of Cumberland University in Lebanon, Tennessee.

Engaging in mercantile pursuits, the real estate, and the lumber business, Scott also became a member of the Tennessee House of Representatives, and served in that capacity from 1913 to 1917. He served as the Republican minority floor leader from 1915 to 1917. He represented Tennessee in the prosecution of Attorney General Estes in an impeachment proceeding before the Tennessee Senate.

Scott resigned as a state representative to serve as a private during the First World War. He was later promoted to a lieutenancy.

Elected as a Republican to the Sixty-seventh Congress, Scott served from March 4, 1921 to March 3, 1923. He was an unsuccessful candidate for re-election in 1922 to the Sixty-eighth Congress. During his congressional term, Scott nominated Willis S. Matthews to the United States Military Academy; Matthews served in the army from 1927 to 1962 and retired as a major general.

He resumed his former business pursuits and resided in Savannah, Tennessee until his death. On February 11, 1931 he died in Savannah, Tennessee after being sick for three months and was interred at Savannah Cemetery.

U.S. House of Representatives
Preceded by Thetus W. Sims	Member of the U.S. House of Representatives from Tennessee's 8th congressional district 1921–1923	Succeeded by Gordon Browning
