= Gordon Browning =

American politician (1889–1976)

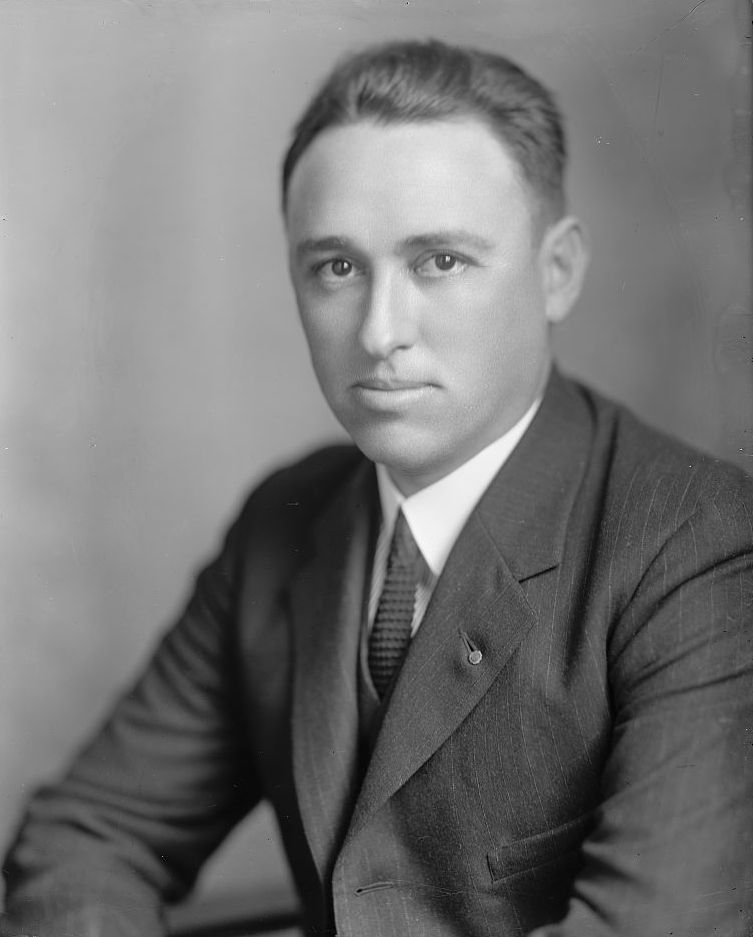
- Browning, c. 1905–1945

38th Governor of Tennessee
- In office January 15, 1937 – January 16, 1939
- Preceded by: Hill McAlister
- Succeeded by: Prentice Cooper
- In office January 16, 1949 – January 15, 1953
- Preceded by: Jim Nance McCord
- Succeeded by: Frank G. Clement

Member of the U.S. House of Representatives from Tennessee
- In office March 4, 1923 – January 3, 1935
- Preceded by: Lon Scott (8th); Willa Eslick (7th)
- Succeeded by: Jere Cooper (8th); Herron C. Pearson (7th)
- Constituency: 8th district (1923-33); 7th district (1933-35)

Personal details
- Born: November 22, 1889 Carroll County, Tennessee, U.S.
- Died: May 23, 1976 (aged 86) Huntingdon, Tennessee, U.S.
- Resting place: Oak Hill Cemetery, Huntingdon, Tennessee
- Party: Democratic
- Spouse: Ida Leach (m. 1920)
- Profession: Attorney
- Awards: Legion of Merit

Military service
- Allegiance: United States
- Branch/service: United States Army
- Years of service: 1917–1919; 1943–1947
- Rank: Lieutenant colonel
- Battles/wars: World War I World War II

Gordon Weaver Browning (November 22, 1889 – May 23, 1976) was an American progressive politician who served as the 38th governor of Tennessee from 1937 to 1939, and again from 1949 to 1953. He also served six terms in the U.S. House of Representatives, from 1923 to 1935, and was Chancellor of Tennessee's Eighth Chancery District in the 1940s. As governor, he stabilized state finances, doubled the state's mileage of paved roads, and enacted legislation to curb voter fraud. His victory in the hard-fought 1948 gubernatorial campaign helped break the power of Memphis political boss E. H. Crump.

In the years following World War II, Browning served in the Allied occupational government in Germany, and was a civil affairs advisor on the staff of General Dwight D. Eisenhower.

== Early life ==
Browning was born near Atwood in Carroll County, Tennessee, the son of James and Melissa (Brooks) Browning. When he was still young, his parents moved to Milan, Tennessee, where his father served as a justice of the peace. He grew up in the historic Browning House. After graduating from Milan High School in 1908, Browning enrolled in Valparaiso University in Indiana, where he earned tuition money waiting tables. He graduated with a Bachelor of Science and a Bachelor of Pedagogy in 1913.

Browning taught school briefly before enrolling in the Cumberland School of Law in Lebanon, Tennessee. He graduated in 1915, and was admitted to the bar shortly afterward. In March 1915, he began practicing in the law office of George McCall in Huntingdon, Tennessee, in his native Carroll County.

In June 1917, after the U.S. entry into World War I, Browning enlisted in the Tennessee National Guard as a 2nd lieutenant in Company D of the First Tennessee Field Artillery. This unit was activated as the 114th Field Artillery of the 30th Infantry Division, under the command of General Lawrence Tyson. Browning was promoted to captain, and transferred to Company A. He fought with the unit in northern France, and was cited for gallantry.

After being discharged in 1919, Browning resumed practice of law in Huntingdon. In 1920, he ran for the 8th district seat in the U.S. House of Representatives, but lost to his former law school classmate, Lon Scott, by a 50% to 49% margin. He ran again in 1922, and was victorious. He represented this district for five consecutive terms (frequently running unopposed), and represented the 7th district for one term (1933–1935) following redistricting. During his final term in the House, Browning was one of the "managers" (prosecutors) in the impeachment hearings of California judge Harold Louderback.

In 1934, Browning sought the Democratic Party nomination for the U.S. Senate seat that had been vacated when Cordell Hull resigned to become Secretary of State. His chief opponent was Nathan L. Bachman, who had been temporarily appointed to the seat. Bachman had the support of Memphis political boss E. H. Crump, who was at the height of his power after the downfall of his rival, Luke Lea, and Browning struggled with voters in East Tennessee. He was defeated by Bachman, 166,293 votes to 121,169.

== First gubernatorial term and World War II ==
In 1936, incumbent Governor Hill McAlister angered Crump by proposing a state sales tax, and did not seek reelection. Browning sought the party's nomination, his chief opponent being Campbell County school superintendent Burgin Dossett. Crump initially proclaimed neutrality, but when it became clear Browning could win with or without the Shelby County vote, he endorsed Browning. Browning coasted to victory in the primary, and defeated the Republican candidate, Pat Thach, 332,523 votes to 77,392 in the general election.

Browning had campaigned on cleaning up state government, getting the debt (which had skyrocketed to over $100 million by the time he took office) under control, and maintaining statewide prohibition (national prohibition had ended with the repeal of the 18th Amendment). In 1937, he signed the Debt Reorganization Act, which consolidated the state's debt, and enacted several taxes. Over the next 10 years, these efforts reduced the state's debt by 40%. He also created the Department of Conservation (now the Tennessee Department of Environment and Conservation), implemented the state portions of several federal programs aimed at providing Depression-era relief, and created a civil service merit system. Browning was, according to one study, “a progressive Roosevelt supporter during his 1937-39 administration.”

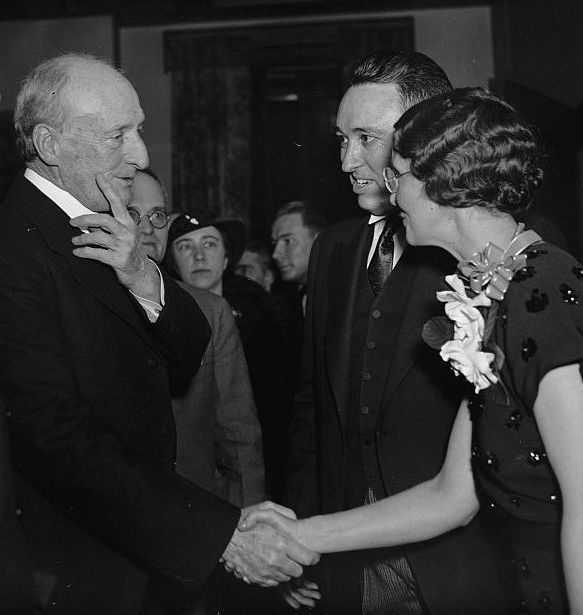
Governor Browning and his wife, Ida, greet U.S. Supreme Court justice James C. McReynolds (left) at a reception in Washington in 1937

In April 1937, Senator Bachman (who had defeated Browning for the Senate seat in 1934) died in office. Browning engineered a plan that would have allowed him to take Bachman's seat, while helping Crump to defeat Kenneth McKellar for the other seat, and allowing Lewis S. Pope to become governor. The plan never materialized, however, as Crump refused to run against his longtime friend, McKellar. Furthermore, Browning had angered Crump by appointing several of Luke Lea's former associates to government positions, while ignoring Crump's requests for appointments. Browning appointed George L. Berry to finish Bachman's term.

In 1938, Prentice Cooper, with Crump's endorsement, challenged Browning for the party's nomination for governor. After learning that Crump had registered over 100,000 voters in Shelby County, Browning sought to replace the primary system with a "county unit" system, which would equalize votes by county, thereby reducing the influence of Shelby. The bill passed, but was declared unconstitutional by the Tennessee Supreme Court prior to the election. Browning also formed a commission to investigate voter fraud in Shelby County, and managed to have over 13,000 voters purged. His efforts fell short, however, and he was defeated by Cooper, 237,853 votes to 158,854.

Following his defeat in the primary, Browning returned to Huntingdon to practice law. In 1942, he was elected Chancellor of the Eighth Chancery District without opposition.

In the months following the U.S. entry into World War II, Browning consistently sought a commission in the U.S. Army, but was thwarted by political foes. He finally appealed directly to the Army's adjutant general in Washington, and was commissioned in 1943 with the rank of captain. He attended the School of Military Government in Charlottesville, Virginia, which trained military officers in matters related to governing occupied territories, and was eventually promoted to the rank of lieutenant colonel. He initially served as deputy head of the Belgium-Luxembourg mission, which aimed to restore civilian government to these areas, and aided in the Allied victory at the Battle of the Bulge in early 1945. In September 1946, Browning was appointed commander of the military government in the Bremen enclave as part of the Allied Occupation of Germany.

== Second gubernatorial term ==
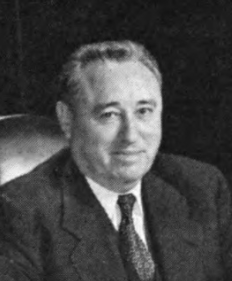
Portrait of Browning as governor

Browning challenged incumbent Governor Jim Nance McCord for the nomination in 1946, though he was still in Europe and did not actively campaign. Though he lost, his 120,535 votes (to McCord's 187,119) showed he still had substantial support in Tennessee.

In 1948, Browning again sought the nomination against McCord. Realizing it would take a considerable effort to defeat the Crump machine, he teamed up with Congressman Estes Kefauver, who was challenging Crump's candidate, Tom Stewart, for one of the state's U.S. Senate seats. Crump ran attack ads against Browning and Kefauver, criticizing the former for issuing too many pardons as governor, and accusing the latter of being a communist sympathizer. Browning compared Crump to Adolf Hitler, and told stories about Crump sneaking through Memphis cemeteries at night to find names of dead people to add to voter lists. He also attacked McCord for implementing a 2% state sales tax (which Crump had reluctantly supported).

As the campaign heated up, Crump's hold on state politics appeared to be weakening. Congressman Al Gore, Sr., returned from Washington to canvass for Browning. Various voting blocks began turning against Crump, among them black voters in Memphis, who had grown tired of his control of the city. Returning veterans sympathized with Browning's military experience, while labor groups were angry with McCord for enacting a right-to-work law. On election day, Browning defeated McCord for the nomination, 231,852 votes to 158,854, and Kefauver defeated Stewart. It was the first defeat for a Crump-backed candidate in a major election in over two decades.

In the general election, Browning faced country music singer Roy Acuff. Republicans had added Acuff's name to their primary ballot as a publicity stunt to draw attention to the party, and he unexpectedly won the nomination. Though Acuff ran a serious campaign, Browning nevertheless won easily, 363,903 votes to 179,957.

During his second tenure as governor, Browning enacted several measures aimed at further weakening Crump and other political bosses, including laws requiring permanent voter registration, open election commission meetings, and metal ballot boxes in places where voting machines were not used. Browning signed legislation that partially eliminated the state's poll tax, which political bosses had used for decades to control votes. Along with election reforms, Browning also increased funding for rural schools and higher education, established a retirement system and minimum salaries for teachers, and expanded the state's system of paved roads from roughly 10,000 miles (16,000 km) to over 20,000 miles (32,000 km).

In the 1950 governor's race, Browning beat back a primary challenge by Nashville attorney and state senator Clifford Allen, winning the nomination 267,855 votes to 208,634. For the first time since the Civil War, no Republican ran in the general election. Browning's only opponent was eccentric attorney John R. Neal, who was running as a third-party candidate. Browning defeated Neal, 184,437 votes to 51,757.

In 1952, rising politician Frank G. Clement challenged Browning for the party's nomination for governor. Clement derided Browning as "dishonest, indecent, and immoral," and criticized the state's purchase of an expensive office building in Nashville. Browning, nearly twice Clement's age, struggled to adapt to the new medium of television. He lost to Clement in the primary, 302,487 votes to 245,156.

== Later life ==
Following his defeat in 1952, Browning returned to Huntingdon to practice law. He again challenged Clement for the party's nomination for governor in 1954, but was defeated by a large margin. He remained active in the Democratic Party, however, travelling frequently to attend party functions. He also operated a dairy farm and an insurance firm. He died on May 23, 1976, and was buried in Huntingdon's Oak Hill Cemetery.

== Family and legacy ==
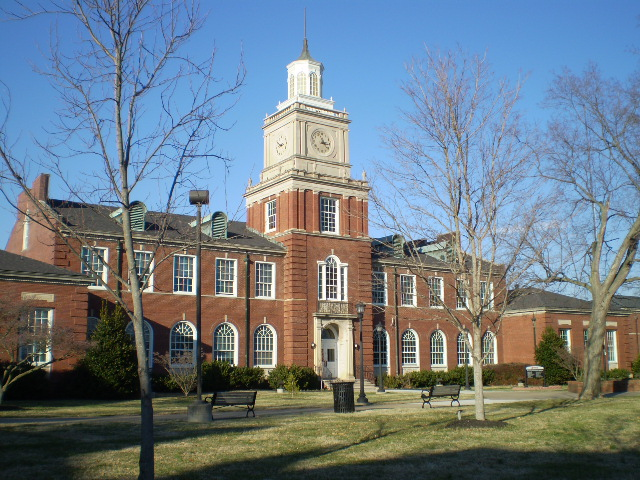
The Browning Building at Austin Peay State University

Browning married Ida Leach in 1920. They had no children.

The Gordon Browning Museum in McKenzie, Tennessee (in Carroll County) preserves documents and artifacts related Browning's life and career. The museum is located in the old McKenzie post office building. Dormitories on the campuses of Tennessee Tech and the University of Tennessee at Martin have been named in honor of Browning. The administration building on the campus of Austin Peay State University is named in Browning's honor. A former dorm at the University of Memphis, which opened as East Hall, was subsequently renamed in his honor and now houses academic offices and support space.

== See also ==
- List of governors of Tennessee

Party political offices
Preceded by Hill McAlister	Democratic nominee for Governor of Tennessee; 1936	Succeeded by Prentice Cooper
Preceded by Jim Nance McCord	Democratic nominee for Governor of Tennessee; 1948, 1950	Succeeded by Frank G. Clement
U.S. House of Representatives
Preceded by Lon A. Scott	U.S. Representative for Tennessee's 8th congressional district 1923-1933	Succeeded by Jere Cooper
Preceded by Willa McCord Blake Eslick	U.S. Representative for Tennessee's 7th congressional district 1933-1935	Succeeded by Herron C. Pearson
Political offices
Preceded by Hill McAlister	Governor of Tennessee; January 15, 1937-January 16, 1939	Succeeded by Prentice Cooper
Preceded by Jim Nance McCord	Governor of Tennessee; January 16, 1949-January 15, 1953	Succeeded by Frank G. Clement
