= Francis X. Lawlor =

American priest and politician (1917–2013)

Francis X. Lawlor (1917 – November 5, 2013) was an American Roman Catholic priest and politician notable for his advocacy against racial integration in Chicago.

== Biography ==
Lawlor was born 1917 in The Bronx. He professed his vows in the Augustinian Order in 1938 and was ordained as a priest in 1945. He taught at St. Rita of Cascia High School in Chicago from 1946 until 1968. At the time, the school was located in Marquette Park, a then-racially segregated, all-white neighborhood.

Lawlor came to prominence as the head of a coalition of white block clubs that fought against Black Chicagoans moving west of Ashland Avenue. Lawlor would later claim his efforts were to prevent white flight. His advocacy brought him into conflict with Archbishop of Chicago John Cody.

In the 1969 Illinois election he was elected as one of two delegates to the Illinois Constitutional Convention from the 25th legislative district. In the 1971 Chicago City Council election, Lawlor defeated Paul Sheridan, the incumbent 16th ward Alderman who had moved from the majority-black 16th ward to the majority-white 15th ward. Lawlor succeeded the late Joseph Kriska.

The 15th ward at the time included all or parts of Marquette Park, West Englewood, and Ashburn. Lawlor joined the anti-Daley voting bloc once on the City Council. He left after a single term to challenge Democratic candidate John G. Fary for Illinois's 5th congressional district in the 1975 special election. Lawlor, as the Republican candidate, lost to Fary.

After his term on the Chicago City Council, he served as the Pro-life Director for the Diocese of Rockford from 1976 to 1984 and Director of Moral Decency in Media from 1984 to 1992. He resided in semi-retirement in St. Louis from 1994 to 2005. In 2010, he moved to Franciscan Village in Lemont, Illinois. He died of congestive heart failure on November 5, 2013.
