= Lebanon Democrat =

Daily American newspaper

- Type: Daily newspaper
- Owner: Paxton Media Group
- Publisher: Mike Alexieff
- Editor: Mike Alexieff
- Founded: 1888
- Political alignment: Independent
- Headquarters: Tennessee, United States
- Website: lebanondemocrat.com

The Lebanon Democrat is a daily newspaper based in Lebanon, a town of more than 32,000 in the central part of the U.S. state of Tennessee. It is published by Lebanon Publishing Co., which is owned by Paxton Media Group.

== History ==
In February 1888, Edgar Waters leased the building, presses, and stock of the former Lebanon Herald. It was purchased a few months later by reporter E. E. Adams, and launched the following year as the Lebanon Democrat, a more partisan publication, featuring President Cleveland and his wife on the masthead. On the editorial page of the paper, as it reads today, was the following statement from Adams. "The Democrat will be devoted to the interest of Wilson County, development of her resources, the upbuilding of her schools and the advancement of her moral and religious interests. It shall be our aim to make a good, local county paper; therefore no local event of any importance will be too small to appear in these columns."

The Democrat started in a building owned by Dr. R.L.C. White in 1889 in the northwest quarter of the Lebanon Public Square, which is currently 123 Public Square. In about 1893, the newspaper moved to the southwest quarter of the Public Square, which is currently 128 Public Square. The third location became the papers home in 1902, upstairs in a building at the corner of South Cumberland Street and East Gay Street, currently 113 1/2 South Cumberland Street. The Democrat occupied its fourth location from 1915 until 1956 at 105 E. Gay St., a single-story building. The Democrat has been in its current location, a former grocery store, at 402 N. Cumberland St. since 1956.

In 1963, long-time editor J. Bill Frame was named president of the Tennessee Press Association.

In 1964 it was sold to a new corporation founded by Carl A. Jones, publisher of the Johnson City Press-Chronicle.

In 2002, it was sold to the Sandusky Acquisition Corporation by the heirs of Jones, marking the end of almost forty years of Jones family ownership.

In 2019, it was sold to the Paxton Media Group.

== Subscription ==
A total of about 500 people regularly subscribe to The Democrat. The Democrat was the primary newspaper of record in Wilson County, Tennessee with local, national and international news coverage. It was published five days a week — Tuesday through Saturday until June 1, 2018, when it became a three-day-a-week publication.

== Sources ==
- Burns, Frank, "The Lebanon Democrat: A Newspaper for its Community 1889-1998," Lebanon, Tenn., 1998.
