= Bill Bishop (author) =

American author, journalist and social commentator

William Allen Bishop
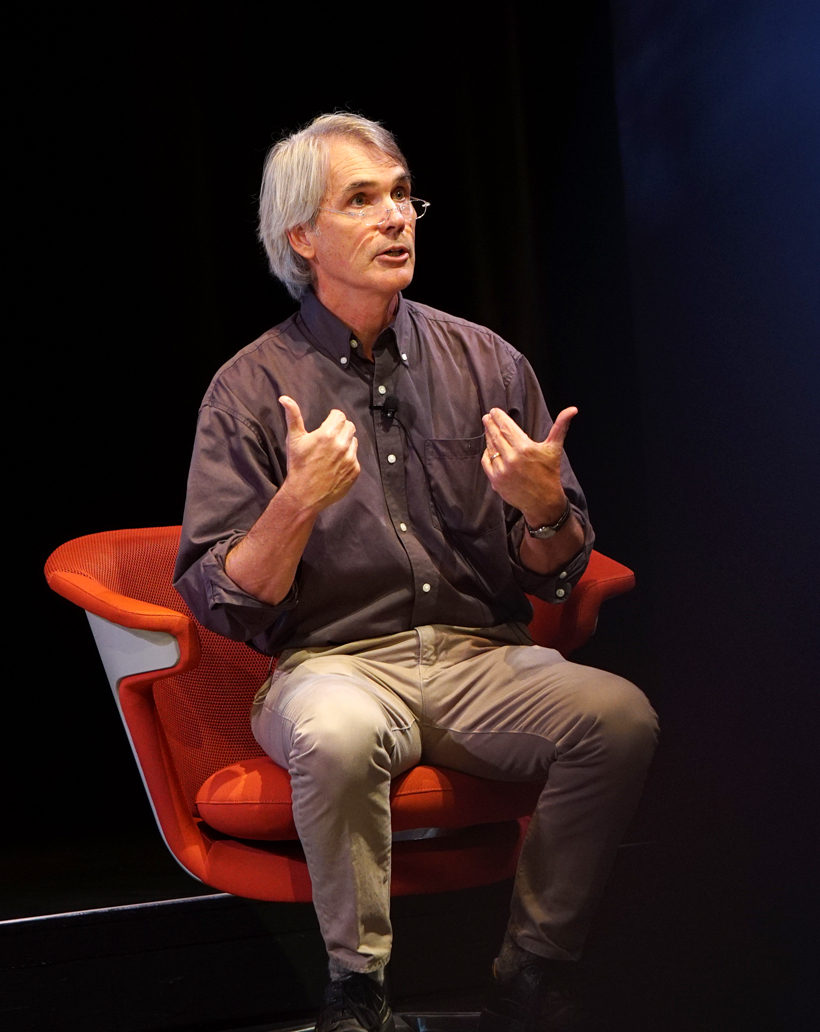
- Bishop speaking at Ideafestival 2015
- Born: 1953; Louisville, Kentucky, U.S.
- Occupations: Author; Journalist; Social commentator
- Known for: Co-author of The Big Sort: Why the Clustering of Like-Minded America is Tearing Us Apart
- Notable work: The Big Sort: Why the Clustering of Like-Minded America Is Tearing Us Apart (co-authored with Robert Cushing)

William Allen Bishop (born 1953) is an American author, journalist and social commentator. He co-wrote a book with retired college professor Robert Cushing entitled The Big Sort: Why the Clustering of Like-Minded America Is Tearing Us Apart. His ideas have influenced the speeches of former U.S. President Bill Clinton.

Bishop was born in Louisville, Kentucky.

He is the co-founder and contributing editor of the Daily Yonder, a blog about rural issues in the United States. Bishop has worked for several newspapers: the Austin American-Statesman, Lexington Herald-Leader, and The Mountain Eagle. He has a degree from Duke University. His wife, Julie Ardery, is also a co-founder and contributing editor of the Daily Yonder. The couple previously owned a newspaper: the Bastrop County Times. They currently live in La Grange, Texas.

== Awards ==
- 1996 Gerald Loeb Award for Commentary
