= Bill Boner =

American politician (born 1945)

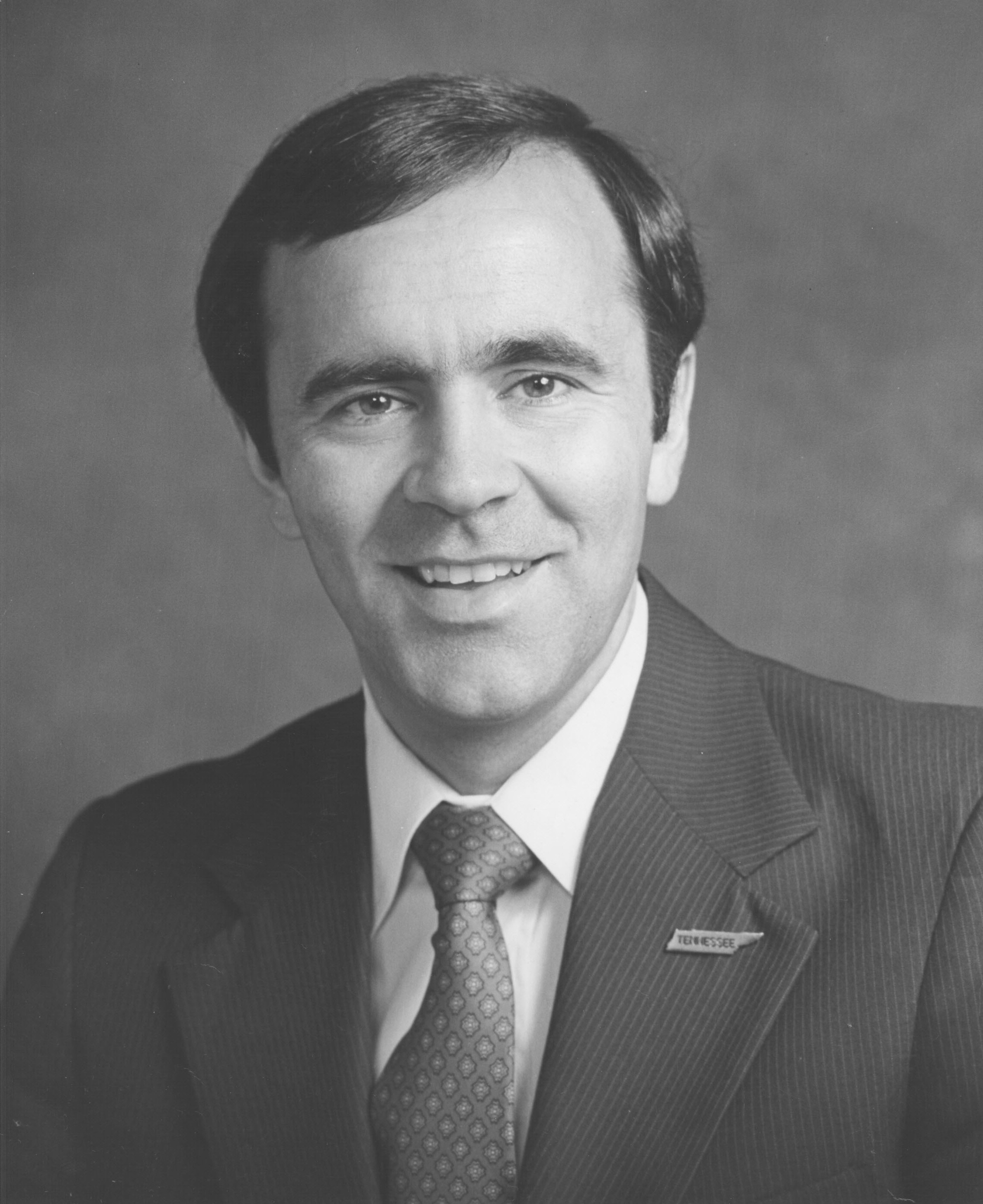

Member of the Tennessee House of Representatives
- In office 1997–1998
- Preceded by: Bill Purcell
- Succeeded by: Rob Briley

3rd Mayor of Metropolitan Nashville
- In office 1987 – September 27, 1991
- Preceded by: Richard Fulton
- Succeeded by: Phil Bredesen

Member of the U.S. House of Representatives from Tennessee's 5th district
- In office January 3, 1979 – October 5, 1987
- Preceded by: Clifford Allen
- Succeeded by: Bob Clement

Member of the Tennessee Senate
- In office January 4, 1977 – January 3, 1979

Member of the Tennessee House of Representatives
- In office January 7, 1975 – January 4, 1977
- Preceded by: Ernest Fleming
- Succeeded by: Ernest Fleming
- Constituency: 52nd district
- In office January 5, 1971 – January 2, 1973
- Preceded by: Walter Morgan
- Succeeded by: Constituency abolished
- Constituency: Davidson's 3rd district

Personal details
- Born: William Hill Boner; February 14, 1945 (age 81) Nashville, Tennessee, U.S.
- Party: Democratic
- Education: Middle Tennessee State University (BS); Peabody College (MA); Nashville School of Law (JD)

William Hill Boner (born February 14, 1945) is an American educator and former Democratic politician from Tennessee. He was the third mayor of the Metropolitan government of Nashville and Davidson County, serving from 1987 to 1991. He served in the U.S. House of Representatives, as the Representative from the 5th District of Tennessee, from 1979 to 1987.

== Biography ==
=== Early life ===
In high school, Bill Boner was a basketball player and tennis player for the East Nashville Eagles. On March 13, 1962, his team won the state championship. Boner scored 18 points within six minutes and 48 seconds in the second quarter. He was elected student body president for the 1962-1963 school year, his senior year. He was also elected governor of Boy's State despite not planning to run until the last minute. He and his teammate missed part of the basketball season that year due to injuries from a car accident. A cheerleader from the nearby Glencliff High School cheerleader was critical condition. Nonetheless, he was selected for the first team All-Nashville in 1963. Boner attended Middle Tennessee State University, where he was elected president of the freshman class and played basketball. He participated in campus life, including a panel on religion, and gave a presentation called "Decision-Making in Personal Life" at a church's study series called "Moral Man and Moral Society". After university, he became the manager of a Shell station in Smyrna. On February 1, 1969, he became the basketball coach for Trevecca Nazarene College and took on a teaching role in the physical education department. During his first year coaching, The Tennessean called the team "loveable losers" for its remarkably poor performance.

=== Congress ===
In 1986, Boner came under investigation by the House Ethics Committee for misusing campaign funds, not disclosing conflicts of interest, receiving an undisclosed gift and receiving a bribe from a government contractor.

=== Mayor ===
In 1987, Nashville Mayor Richard Fulton was prevented from running for a fourth term. Boner entered the race. He was opposed by managed health care executive Phil Bredesen. Boner won the first round, but was short of a majority. Under the Metro Charter, Boner defeated Bredesen in a runoff and became mayor of Nashville.

=== Appearance on The Phil Donahue Show ===
During his term as mayor, Boner made a controversial appearance on the October 15, 1990 episode of The Phil Donahue Show.

Boner appeared on the show with Traci Peel, a country singer in Nashville. The couple were engaged while Boner was still married to his third wife. In the Donahue appearance, Boner played harmonica, while Peel sang "Rocky Top".

Boner and Peel married and divorced.

== After term as mayor ==
Boner did not seek reelection for a second term. Following retirement from political office, Boner owned a pallet factory in Tompkinsville, Kentucky, and purchased a restaurant franchise in Atlanta.

Boner returned to the Nashville area, becoming a social studies teacher at Franklin High School in Franklin, Tennessee. He was a driver's education instructor for the Williamson School System.

In 1995 and 1996, Boner hosted a nightly hour-long television interview show on Nashville's WNAB called Prime Talk.

== Sources ==
- United States Congress. "Bill Boner (id: B000615)". Biographical Directory of the United States Congress.
- Appearances on C-SPAN

U.S. House of Representatives
| Preceded by Clifford Allen | Member of the U.S. House of Representatives from Tennessee's 5th congressional district 1979–1987 | Succeeded by Bob Clement |
Political offices
| Preceded by Richard Fulton | Mayor of Nashville; 1987–1991 | Succeeded by Phil Bredesen |
U.S. order of precedence (ceremonial)
| Preceded by Ben Chandler as Former U.S. Representative | Order of precedence of the United States as Former U.S. Representative | Succeeded by Ed Bryant as Former U.S. Representative |
