= Tennessee's 5th congressional district =

U.S. House district for Tennessee

Coordinates: 36°11′14″N 87°04′27″W

- Interactive map of district boundaries
- Representative: Andy Ogles; R–Culleoka
- Distribution: 88.68% urban; 11.32% rural
- Population (2025): 830,662
- Median household income: $101,652
- Ethnicity: 69.2% White; 11.8% Black; 10.3% Hispanic; 4.2% Asian; 3.9% Two or more races; 0.6% other
- Cook PVI: R+10

The 5th congressional district of Tennessee is a congressional district in Middle and West Tennessee. It has been represented by Republican Andy Ogles since January 2023.

In the past, the fifth district has been nearly synonymous with Tennessee's capital city, Nashville, as the district has almost always been centered on Nashville throughout the 20th and early 21st centuries. The city is a center for the music, healthcare, publishing, banking and transportation industries, and is home to numerous colleges and universities (its old nickname was "the Athens of the South"). It is also home to the Grand Ole Opry and Country Music Hall of Fame and Museum, earning it the nickname "Music City".

Since the 2022 election cycle, there is no longer a congressional district centered on the city of Nashville itself. Tennessee's 5th is a gerrymandered district designed to favor Republican candidates. Prior to the 2020 House Redistricting Cycle, the district contained the entirety of Davidson County (which is coterminous with Nashville), making it a safe seat for the Democratic Party. Following redistricting, Nashville was cracked into 3 separate districts, effectively diluting the city's heavily Democratic voter base into the surrounding suburban and rural counties, which lean strongly Republican. After further redistricting in 2026, the district is composed of major communities such as Lebanon, Mount Juliet (two of the fastest growing areas in Tennessee), Brentwood, Columbia, Spring Hill, Mount Pleasant, Hohenwald, and Lewisburg.

It is the wealthiest congressional district in the state of Tennessee.

== Composition ==
For the 118th and successive Congresses (based on redistricting following the 2020 census), the district contains all or portions of the following counties and communities:

Davidson County (4)

Belle Meade, Forest Hills, Nashville (part; also 6th and 7th), Oak Hill

Lewis County (1)

Hohenwald

Marshall County (4)

All 4 communities

Maury County (4)

All 4 communities

Wilson County (7)

Gladeville, Green Hill, Greenvale (part; also 6th), Lebanon (part; also 6th), Mount Juliet (part; also 6th), Norene, Rural Hill

Williamson County (5)

Brentwood (part; also 7th), Franklin (part; also 7th), Nolensville, Spring Hill (shared with Maury County), Thompson's Station (part; also 7th)

== Recent election results ==
Results under old lines (2013-2023)

United States House of Representatives elections in Tennessee, 2012: District 5
Party	Candidate	Votes	%	±%
Democratic	Jim Cooper (incumbent)	171,358	65.22	+9.0
Republican	Brad Staats	86,153	32.79	−9.3
Green	John Miglietta	5,208	1.98	+1.8
Write-in candidate	Sean Puckett	12	0.0	
Total votes		262,731	100.00	
Democratic hold				

United States House of Representatives elections in Tennessee, 2014: District 5
Party	Candidate	Votes	%	±%
Democratic	Jim Cooper (incumbent)	96,148	62.32	−2.9
Republican	Bob Ries	55,078	35.70	+2.91
Independent	Paul Deakin	9,634	6.24	+6.2
Total votes		160,860	100.00	
Democratic hold				

United States House of Representatives elections in Tennessee, 2016: District 5
Party	Candidate	Votes	%	±%
Democratic	Jim Cooper (incumbent)	171,111	62.55	+0.23
Republican	Stacy Ries Snyder	102,433	37.44	+1.74
Total votes		273,544	100.00	
Democratic hold				

United States House of Representatives elections in Tennessee, 2018: District 5
Party	Candidate	Votes	%	±%
Democratic	Jim Cooper (incumbent)	177,923	67.84	+5.29
Republican	Jody M. Ball	84,317	32.15	−5.29
Write-in candidate	Marshal Weaver	8	0.0	
Total votes		202,248	100.00	
Democratic hold				

United States House of Representatives elections in Tennessee, 2020: District 5
Party	Candidate	Votes	%	±%
Democratic	Jim Cooper (incumbent)	252,155	100.00	+32.16
Write-in		14	0.0	
Total votes		252,169	100.00	
Democratic hold				

Results under new lines (2023–present)

United States House of Representatives Elections in Tennessee, 2022: District 5
Party	Candidate	Votes	%	±%
Republican	Andy Ogles	123,558	55.84	+55.84
Democratic	Heidi Campbell	93,648	42.32	−57.75
Independent	Derrick Brantley	2,090	0.95	
Independent	Daniel Cooper	1,132	0.51	
Independent	Rich Shannon	847	0.38	
Total votes		221,275	100.00	
Republican gain from Democratic				

2024 Tennessee's 5th congressional district election results
Party	Candidate	Votes	%	±%
Republican	Andy Ogles (incumbent)	205,075	56.85%	
Democratic	Maryam Abolfazli	142,387	39.47%	
Independent	Jim Larkin	7,607	2.11%	
Independent	Bob Titley	3,065	0.85%	
Independent	Yomi Faparusi	2,580	0.72%	
Total votes		360,714	100.00%	
Republican hold				

== Recent election results from statewide races ==
=== Results under 2022 lines ===
Year	Office	Results
2008	President	McCain 57% - 41%
2012	President	Romney 61% - 39%
2016	President	Trump 56% - 39%
2018	Senate	Blackburn 49.54% - 49.50%
2018	Governor	Lee 54% - 43%
2020	President	Trump 55% - 43%
2020	Senate	Hagerty 58% - 40%
2022	Governor	Lee 59% - 40%
2024	President	Trump 58% - 40%
2024	Senate	Blackburn 58% - 40%

== History ==
Following the 1950 census, Tennessee expanded briefly to ten districts. Even though it has since contracted back to nine districts, that marked the beginning of the continuous period where the 5th district was centered on Davidson County/Nashville.

From 1941 to 1957, Nashville was represented by J. Percy Priest, who was the House majority whip in the 81st and 82nd Congresses. A dam in eastern Davidson County and the lake formed by the dam are both named in his memory.

Priest died just before the Election of 1956, and the Democrats turned to Carlton Loser. Loser won that election, and then to two more Congresses after that. Loser appeared to win another Democratic nomination in 1962, but his primary came under investigation for voter fraud, and a court ordered a new election. In this new election, Loser was defeated by former state senator Richard Fulton.

Richard "Dick" Fulton represented the 5th from 1963 until August 1975, when he retired from Congress to become the second mayor of metropolitan Nashville. Following the 1970 census, while Fulton was representing the district, Tennessee briefly contracted to eight congressional districts. During the 1970s, the district encompassed Davidson, Cheatham, and Robertson counties. This contraction of congressional districts forced the first time in thirty years that Davidson County was not the sole county in the district. (The fifth was only Davidson County from 1943 to 1972.)

Once Fulton was Nashville's mayor, he was succeeded in Congress by former state senator Clifford Allen. Allen served for only a term and a half (November 1975 - June 1978) before he died in office due to complications from a heart attack suffered a month earlier.

In the election of 1978, the fifth district selected state senator Bill Boner. He served in Congress for ten years, and then succeeded Fulton as mayor of Nashville. Boner was succeeded in 1988 by Bob Clement, former president of Cumberland University and son of the former governor Frank G. Clement. Clement served seven terms in Congress, where he represented Davidson and Robertson counties. He was one of the 81 Democratic congressmen who voted for the Iraq Resolution of 2002.

Clement did not run for re-election in 2002, as he was running for the open U.S. Senate seat left by retiring Fred Thompson. He won the Democratic nomination easily, but was defeated in the general election by former governor Lamar Alexander. Clement was succeeded in Congress by Jim Cooper, who, like Clement, was also the son of a former governor. Cooper is considered a blue dog Democrat. According to On The Issues, he is deemed "moderate", but is slightly to the left of the political center. After the 2020 United States redistricting cycle moved the 5th district to the Republican-leaning suburbs to the south of Nashville, Cooper announced that he would not run again in 2022. He was succeeded in Congress by Andy Ogles, the former mayor of Maury County.

== List of members representing the district ==
Member (Residence)	Party	Years	Cong ress	Electoral history	District location
District formatting March 4, 1813
Felix Grundy (Nashville)	Democratic-Republican	March 4, 1813 – July 1814	13th	Redistricted from the 3rd district and re-elected in 1813. Resigned.	1813–1823; Bedford, Davidson, Lincoln, Rutherford, and Williamson counties
Vacant		July 1814 – September 16, 1814	13th		1813–1823; Bedford, Davidson, Lincoln, Rutherford, and Williamson counties
Newton Cannon (Williamson County)	Democratic-Republican	September 16, 1814 – March 3, 1817	13th 14th	Elected to finish Grundy's term. Re-elected in 1815. Lost re-election.	1813–1823; Bedford, Davidson, Lincoln, Rutherford, and Williamson counties
Thomas Claiborne (Nashville)	Democratic-Republican	March 4, 1817 – March 3, 1819	15th	Elected in 1817. Retired.	1813–1823; Bedford, Davidson, Lincoln, Rutherford, and Williamson counties
Newton Cannon (Williamson County)	Democratic-Republican	March 4, 1819 – March 3, 1823	16th 17th	Elected in 1819. Re-elected in 1821. Retired.	1813–1823; Bedford, Davidson, Lincoln, Rutherford, and Williamson counties
Robert Allen (Carthage)	Democratic-Republican (Note: Supported the Jackson faction in the 1824 United States presidential election)	March 4, 1823 – March 3, 1825	18th 19th	Redistricted from the 4th district and re-elected in 1823. Re-elected in 1825. Retired.	1823–1833; Smith, Sumner, and Wilson counties
Robert Allen (Carthage)	Jacksonian	March 4, 1825 – March 3, 1827	18th 19th	Redistricted from the 4th district and re-elected in 1823. Re-elected in 1825. Retired.	1823–1833; Smith, Sumner, and Wilson counties
Robert Desha (Gallatin)	Jacksonian	March 4, 1827 – March 3, 1831	20th 21st	Elected in 1827. Re-elected in 1829. Retired.	1823–1833; Smith, Sumner, and Wilson counties
William Hall (Sumner County)	Jacksonian	March 4, 1831 – March 3, 1833	22nd	Elected in 1831. Retired.	1823–1833; Smith, Sumner, and Wilson counties
John B. Forester (McMinnville)	Jacksonian	March 4, 1833 – March 3, 1835	23rd 24th	Elected in 1833. Re-elected in 1835. Retired.	1833–1843 [data missing]
John B. Forester (McMinnville)	Anti-Jacksonian	March 4, 1835 – March 3, 1837	23rd 24th	Elected in 1833. Re-elected in 1835. Retired.	1833–1843 [data missing]
Hopkins L. Turney (Winchester)	Democratic	March 4, 1837 – March 3, 1843	25th 26th 27th	Elected in 1837. Re-elected in 1839. Re-elected in 1841. Retired.	1833–1843 [data missing]
George Washington Jones (Fayetteville)	Democratic	March 4, 1843 – March 3, 1853	28th 29th 30th 31st 32nd	Elected in 1843. Re-elected in 1845. Re-elected in 1847. Re-elected in 1849. Re-elected in 1851. Redistricted to the 6th district.	1843–1853 [data missing]
Charles Ready (Murfreesboro)	Whig	March 4, 1853 – March 3, 1855	33rd 34th 35th	Elected in 1853. Re-elected in 1855. Re-elected in 1857. Lost re-election.	1853–1861 [data missing]
Charles Ready (Murfreesboro)	Know Nothing	March 4, 1855 – March 3, 1859	33rd 34th 35th	Elected in 1853. Re-elected in 1855. Re-elected in 1857. Lost re-election.	1853–1861 [data missing]
Robert H. Hatton (Lebanon)	Opposition	March 4, 1859 – March 3, 1861	36th	Elected in 1859. Retired to join the Confederate Army.	1853–1861 [data missing]
District inactive		March 3, 1861 – July 24, 1866	37th 38th 39th	Civil War and Reconstruction	
William B. Campbell (Lebanon)	National Union	July 24, 1866 – March 3, 1867	39th	Elected in 1865. Retired.	1866–1873 [data missing]
John Trimble (Nashville)	Republican	March 4, 1867 – March 3, 1869	40th	Elected in 1867. Retired.	1866–1873 [data missing]
William F. Prosser (Nashville)	Republican	March 4, 1869 – March 3, 1871	41st	Elected in 1868. Lost re-election.	1866–1873 [data missing]
Edward I. Golladay (Lebanon)	Democratic	March 4, 1871 – March 3, 1873	42nd	Elected in 1870. Lost re-election.	1866–1873 [data missing]
Horace Harrison (Nashville)	Republican	March 4, 1873 – March 3, 1875	43rd	Elected in 1872. Redistricted to the 6th district and lost re-election.	1873–1883 [data missing]
John M. Bright (Fayetteville)	Democratic	March 4, 1875 – March 3, 1881	44th 45th 46th	Redistricted from the 4th district and re-elected in 1874. Re-elected in 1876. Re-elected in 1878. Lost re-election as an Independent Democrat.	1873–1883 [data missing]
Richard Warner (Lewisburg)	Democratic	March 4, 1881 – March 3, 1885	47th 48th	Elected in 1880. Re-elected in 1882. Lost renomination.	1873–1883 [data missing]
Richard Warner (Lewisburg)	Democratic	March 4, 1881 – March 3, 1885	47th 48th	Elected in 1880. Re-elected in 1882. Lost renomination.	1883–1893 [data missing]
James D. Richardson (Murfreesboro)	Democratic	March 4, 1885 – March 3, 1905	49th 50th 51st 52nd 53rd 54th 55th 56th 57th 58th	Elected in 1884. Re-elected in 1886. Re-elected in 1888. Re-elected in 1890. Re-elected in 1892. Re-elected in 1894. Re-elected in 1896. Re-elected in 1898. Re-elected in 1900. Re-elected in 1902. Retired.	1883–1893 [data missing]
James D. Richardson (Murfreesboro)	Democratic	March 4, 1885 – March 3, 1905	49th 50th 51st 52nd 53rd 54th 55th 56th 57th 58th	Elected in 1884. Re-elected in 1886. Re-elected in 1888. Re-elected in 1890. Re-elected in 1892. Re-elected in 1894. Re-elected in 1896. Re-elected in 1898. Re-elected in 1900. Re-elected in 1902. Retired.	1893–1903 [data missing]
James D. Richardson (Murfreesboro)	Democratic	March 4, 1885 – March 3, 1905	49th 50th 51st 52nd 53rd 54th 55th 56th 57th 58th	Elected in 1884. Re-elected in 1886. Re-elected in 1888. Re-elected in 1890. Re-elected in 1892. Re-elected in 1894. Re-elected in 1896. Re-elected in 1898. Re-elected in 1900. Re-elected in 1902. Retired.	1903–1913 [data missing]
William C. Houston (Woodbury)	Democratic	March 4, 1905 – March 3, 1919	59th 60th 61st 62nd 63rd 64th 65th	Elected in 1904. Re-elected in 1906. Re-elected in 1908. Re-elected in 1910. Re-elected in 1912. Re-elected in 1914. Re-elected in 1916. Retired.	1903–1913 [data missing]
William C. Houston (Woodbury)	Democratic	March 4, 1905 – March 3, 1919	59th 60th 61st 62nd 63rd 64th 65th	Elected in 1904. Re-elected in 1906. Re-elected in 1908. Re-elected in 1910. Re-elected in 1912. Re-elected in 1914. Re-elected in 1916. Retired.	1913–1923 [data missing]
Ewin L. Davis (Tullahoma)	Democratic	March 4, 1919 – March 3, 1933	66th 67th 68th 69th 70th 71st 72nd	Elected in 1918. Re-elected in 1920. Re-elected in 1922. Re-elected in 1924. Re-elected in 1926. Re-elected in 1928. Re-elected in 1930. Lost renomination.	1913–1923 [data missing]
Ewin L. Davis (Tullahoma)	Democratic	March 4, 1919 – March 3, 1933	66th 67th 68th 69th 70th 71st 72nd	Elected in 1918. Re-elected in 1920. Re-elected in 1922. Re-elected in 1924. Re-elected in 1926. Re-elected in 1928. Re-elected in 1930. Lost renomination.	1923–1933 [data missing]
Jo Byrns (Nashville)	Democratic	March 4, 1933 – June 4, 1936	73rd 74th	Redistricted from the 6th district and re-elected in 1932. Re-elected in 1934. Died.	1933–1943 [data missing]
Vacant		June 4, 1936 – January 3, 1937	74th		1933–1943 [data missing]
Richard M. Atkinson (Nashville)	Democratic	January 3, 1937 – January 3, 1939	75th	Elected in 1936. Lost renomination.	1933–1943 [data missing]
Jo Byrns Jr. (Nashville)	Democratic	January 3, 1939 – January 3, 1941	76th	Elected in 1938. Lost re-election.	1933–1943 [data missing]
Percy Priest (Nashville)	Independent Democratic	January 3, 1941 – January 3, 1943	77th	Elected in 1940. Redistricted to the 6th district.	1933–1943 [data missing]
Jim Nance McCord (Lewisburg)	Democratic	January 3, 1943 – January 3, 1945	78th	Elected in 1942. Retired to run for Governor of Tennessee.	1943–1953 [data missing]
Harold Earthman (Murfreesboro)	Democratic	January 3, 1945 – January 3, 1947	79th	Elected in 1944. Lost renomination.	1943–1953 [data missing]
Joe L. Evins (Smithville)	Democratic	January 3, 1947 – January 3, 1953	80th 81st 82nd	Elected in 1946. Re-elected in 1948. Re-elected in 1950. Redistricted to the 4th district.	1943–1953 [data missing]
Percy Priest (Nashville)	Democratic	January 3, 1953 – October 12, 1956	83rd 84th	Redistricted from the 6th district and re-elected in 1952. Re-elected in 1954. Died.	1953–1963 [data missing]
Vacant		October 12, 1956 – January 3, 1957	84th		1953–1963 [data missing]
J. Carlton Loser (Nashville)	Democratic	January 3, 1957 – January 3, 1963	85th 86th 87th	Elected in 1956. Re-elected in 1958. Re-elected in 1960. Lost renomination.	1953–1963 [data missing]
Richard Fulton (Goodlettsville)	Democratic	January 3, 1963 – August 14, 1975	88th 89th 90th 91st 92nd 93rd 94th	Elected in 1962. Re-elected in 1964. Re-elected in 1966. Re-elected in 1968. Re-elected in 1970. Re-elected in 1972. Re-elected in 1974. Resigned to become Mayor of Nashville.	1963–1973 [data missing]
Richard Fulton (Goodlettsville)	Democratic	January 3, 1963 – August 14, 1975	88th 89th 90th 91st 92nd 93rd 94th	Elected in 1962. Re-elected in 1964. Re-elected in 1966. Re-elected in 1968. Re-elected in 1970. Re-elected in 1972. Re-elected in 1974. Resigned to become Mayor of Nashville.	1973–1983; Cheatham, Davidson, and Robertson counties.
Vacant		August 14, 1975 – November 25, 1975	94th		1973–1983; Cheatham, Davidson, and Robertson counties.
Clifford Allen (Nashville)	Democratic	November 25, 1975 – June 18, 1978	94th 95th	Elected to finish Fulton's term. Re-elected in 1976. Died.	1973–1983; Cheatham, Davidson, and Robertson counties.
Vacant		June 18, 1978 – January 3, 1979	95th		1973–1983; Cheatham, Davidson, and Robertson counties.
Bill Boner (Nashville)	Democratic	January 3, 1979 – October 5, 1987	96th 97th 98th 99th 100th	Elected in 1978. Re-elected in 1980. Re-elected in 1982. Re-elected in 1984. Re-elected in 1986. Resigned to become Mayor of Nashville.	1973–1983; Cheatham, Davidson, and Robertson counties.
Bill Boner (Nashville)	Democratic	January 3, 1979 – October 5, 1987	96th 97th 98th 99th 100th	Elected in 1978. Re-elected in 1980. Re-elected in 1982. Re-elected in 1984. Re-elected in 1986. Resigned to become Mayor of Nashville.	1983–1993; Davidson and Robertson counties.
Vacant		October 5, 1987 – January 19, 1988	100th		1983–1993; Davidson and Robertson counties.
Bob Clement (Nashville)	Democratic	January 19, 1988 – January 3, 2003	100th 101st 102nd 103rd 104th 105th 106th 107th	Elected to finish Boner's term. Re-elected in 1988. Re-elected in 1990. Re-elected in 1992. Re-elected in 1994. Re-elected in 1996. Re-elected in 1998. Re-elected in 2000. Retired to run for U.S. senator.	1983–1993; Davidson and Robertson counties.
Bob Clement (Nashville)	Democratic	January 19, 1988 – January 3, 2003	100th 101st 102nd 103rd 104th 105th 106th 107th	Elected to finish Boner's term. Re-elected in 1988. Re-elected in 1990. Re-elected in 1992. Re-elected in 1994. Re-elected in 1996. Re-elected in 1998. Re-elected in 2000. Retired to run for U.S. senator.	1993–2003; Davidson and Robertson counties.
Jim Cooper (Nashville)	Democratic	January 3, 2003 – January 3, 2023	108th 109th 110th 111th 112th 113th 114th 115th 116th 117th	Elected in 2002. Re-elected in 2004. Re-elected in 2006. Re-elected in 2008. Re-elected in 2010. Re-elected in 2012. Re-elected in 2014. Re-elected in 2016. Re-elected in 2018. Re-elected in 2020. Retired due to redistricting.	2003–2013 Cheatham, Davidson, and Wilson counties.
Jim Cooper (Nashville)	Democratic	January 3, 2003 – January 3, 2023	108th 109th 110th 111th 112th 113th 114th 115th 116th 117th	Elected in 2002. Re-elected in 2004. Re-elected in 2006. Re-elected in 2008. Re-elected in 2010. Re-elected in 2012. Re-elected in 2014. Re-elected in 2016. Re-elected in 2018. Re-elected in 2020. Retired due to redistricting.	2013–2023 Cheatham, Davidson, and Dickson counties.
Andy Ogles (Culleoka)	Republican	January 3, 2023 – present	118th 119th	Elected in 2022. Re-elected in 2024. Lost renomination.	2023–present Davidson, Lewis, Marshall, Maury, Williamson, and Wilson counties.
Charlie Hatcher	Republican	Assuming office on January 3, 2027		Elected in 2026.	2023–present Davidson, Lewis, Marshall, Maury, Williamson, and Wilson counties.

== See also ==
- Tennessee's congressional districts
- List of United States congressional districts

== Notes ==
U.S. House of Representatives
Preceded by Illinois's 20th congressional district	Home district of the speaker of the House; January 3, 1935 – June 4, 1936	Succeeded by Alabama's 7th congressional district
