= Clifford Allen =

American politician (1912–1978)

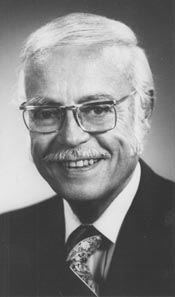

Member of the U.S. House of Representatives from Tennessee's 5th district
- In office November 25, 1975 – June 18, 1978
- Preceded by: Richard Fulton
- Succeeded by: Bill Boner

Member of the Tennessee Senate
- In office 1949-1951; 1955-1959

Personal details
- Born: January 6, 1912 Jacksonville, Florida, U.S.
- Died: June 18, 1978 (aged 66) Nashville, Tennessee, U.S.
- Party: Democratic Party
- Education: Cumberland School of Law

Clifford Robertson Allen (January 6, 1912 – June 18, 1978) was an American attorney and Democratic politician who was a member of the Tennessee Senate from 1949 to 1951, and again from 1955 to 1959. He was elected to the United States House of Representatives in 1975, where he served until his death.

== Early life and career ==
Allen was born in Jacksonville, Florida, and graduated from Friends High School (now Sidwell Friends) in Washington, D.C. He graduated from the Cumberland School of Law in Lebanon, Tennessee in 1931 and was admitted to the Tennessee bar the same year. He was elected to a first term in the Tennessee State Senate in 1948. In 1950 he first ran for governor of Tennessee in the Democratic primary against incumbent governor Gordon Browning and was defeated in a very close election where Allen's main issue was that the state should start providing free school textbooks to all school children. Running again in 1952 he was again defeated, running third (Frank G. Clement was the winner, with Browning finishing second). Allen was seen by some as the representative of the urban and progressive forces as opposed to those whose support was largely rural, such as Clement. He was also a staunch opponent of Boss Crump of Memphis, and was invariably opposed by the Crump political machine. The rivalry between Allen and Clement was such that on one occasion, health inspectors shut down a downtown Nashville restaurant owned by Allen, who got a court order allowing it to reopen. This was judged by Nashvillians to have been politically motivated, and the restaurant reopened to long lines.

Allen was elected to the State Senate again in 1954 where he was a strong advocate for teachers and the public schools. Allen urged enforcement of Brown v. Board of Education. In 1958 he again entered the Democratic primary for governor, losing to Buford Ellington, a Clement colleague who had served Clement both as campaign manager and Cabinet member. During this period of what was essentially one-party rule in Tennessee (by the Democrats in the western two-thirds of the state and by the Republicans in East Tennessee), organized factions within the parties often served the role traditionally served by parties, nominating tickets of candidates who ran together, pooled their resources in advertising, and generally ran for office as a unit.

In January, 1957 the Tennessee State Senate refused to seat Richard Fulton, who had been elected to the seat formerly held by Allen. Fulton had run for the office in the place of his popular older brother Lyle, who had died of cancer shortly after entering the race to succeed Allen, but was several weeks short of having reached the constitutionally required age of 30 prior to the beginning of the legislative session, and Allen was appointed back to this seat again.

== Assessor of Property ==
In 1960 Allen was elected Assessor of Property for Davidson County, Tennessee. This position was (and generally still is) widely regarded as an unglamorous administrative courthouse position, little-noticed by the public except when complaints are made about increasing property assessments. However, Allen was to make it his political base for the next 15 years. In 1962, Nashville voters agreed to merge many of the functions of the former City of Nashville municipal government and those of Davidson County into a metropolitan government. While the position of assessor of property (popularly referred to as "tax assessor") was retained in the combined government, Allen decided to run for mayor of the consolidated city-county. Allen finished second behind long-time rival Beverly Briley, the last county judge (chief executive) of Davidson County. The new Metropolitan Charter required a runoff since no one received a majority, and Briley defeated Allen in the runoff.

Allen long had positioned himself as a populist, a defender of the rights of the elderly, impoverished, and "average people". He worked to make a certain amount of property held by elderly homeowners with low incomes exempt from property tax. The issue with which he will be perennially identified in Tennessee political history is undoubtedly that of "Question 3". The Tennessee State Constitution had stood unamended from 1870 to 1952, the longest any such document had ever stood such in the world. In part, this was due to the extremely difficult procedure set by the document for amendment. One of the methods permitted allowed the legislature to put on the ballot a call for a limited constitutional convention, one which would be limited to discussion and proposals on only those parts of the constitution named in the call. This procedure was limited to once in a six-year period; beginning in the 1950s conventions began to be held almost as often as allowable, and had made considerable changes in the state's basic document, such as allowing city-county consolidation as alluded to above and also for other updatings such as the extension of gubernatorial and state senate terms from two to four years, allowing legislators to be paid over and above expense money, and other similar modernizations. Allen began to shape the 1971 convention to suit his principal issue. In Tennessee, the rate of assessment to appraisal on property taxes had long varied from county to county, with some counties applying the entire rate (expressed as dollars and cents per hundred of value such as "$1.27") on the entire appraised value of a property; most others applied a percentage of it, which varied wildly (from as low as 25% to as high as 70%). This system was needlessly confusing and arcane, and made comparison of tax rates from one jurisdiction to another very difficult (which some stated was one of the prime reasons for its existence). Allen managed to explain this difficult and confusing issue in such a way as to win a large majority for the holding of a constitutional convention in which it would be discussed. It was known as "Question 3" because the legislature at the same time proposed four other constitutional sections for discussion at the same convention; however these other propositions were all voted down, limiting the scope of the convention solely to the property tax issue. Allen was aided by the existence of the six-year limit between such events; opponents of a state income tax were aware that if a convention were to be held and limited to the property tax issue, another one at which an income tax might be proposed could not be held for at least another six years.

Having helped pass the call for the convention, Allen then set out to shape it to his ideas, firstly by winning election to it as a delegate while continuing to serve as assessor of property. Allen soon became the leading figure of the convention, and its proposal, which called for an assessment of 25% of appraised value on residential and agricultural property and 40% on commercial property and even higher on utilities, was essentially Allen's plan, and was subsequently approved by Tennessee voters and remains the law as of 2012 except that the U.S. Senate overrode the higher tax rate on utilities at the urging of Senator Howard Baker. This victory helped to assuage the defeat which Allen had suffered earlier in the year, when he lost another race for mayor. In this race Allen was shocked to have finished fourth, well short of participation in the runoff (which again was won by Briley over runner-up Casey Jenkins, a former motion picture projectionist who had gained notoriety largely as an opponent of forced busing for school desegregation). Progressives such as Allen in this election were hurt by the busing decision that was announced in the month before the election and fueled massive white turnout for the anti-integration candidates such as Jenkins.

== Congressman ==
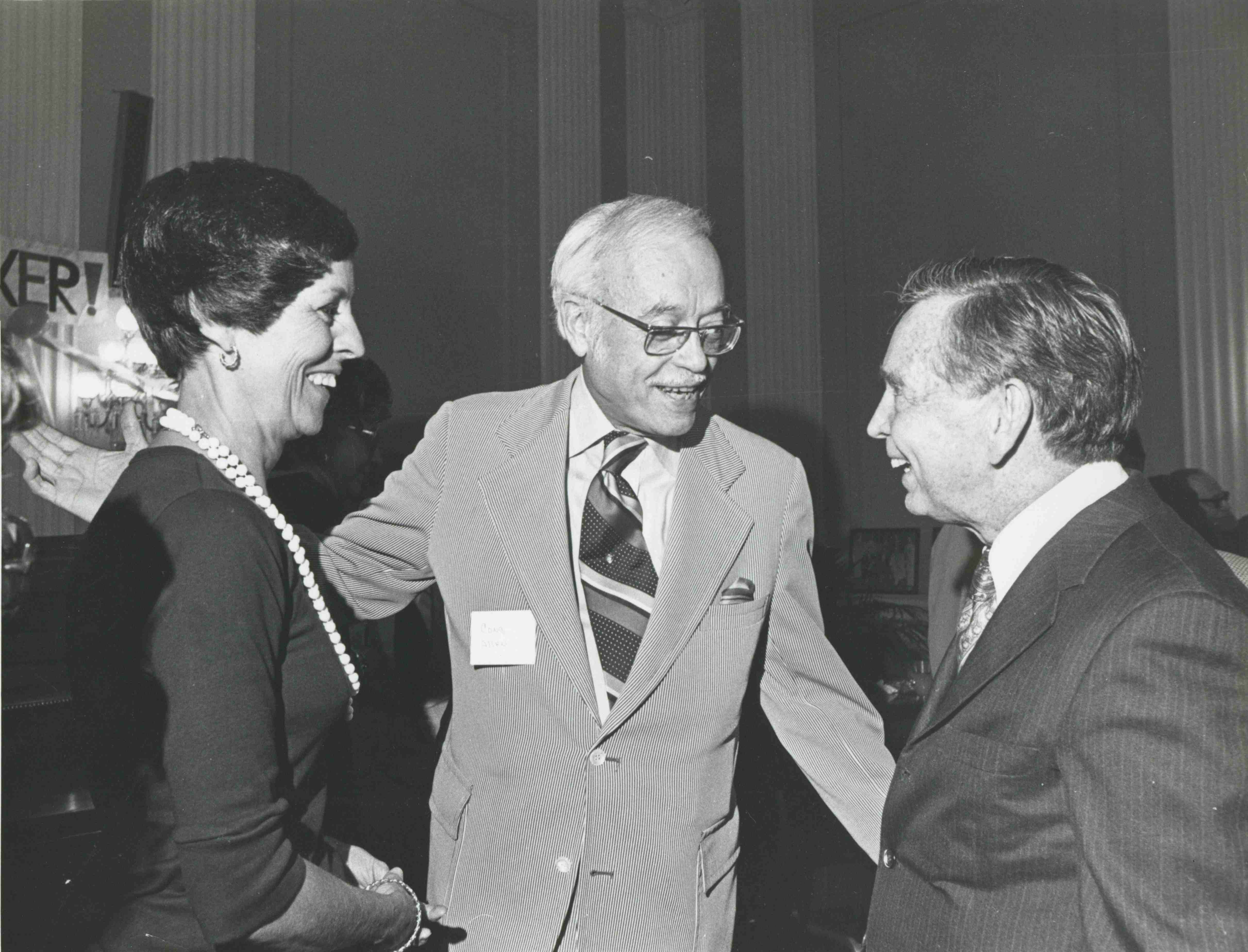
Allen (middle) with Speaker Carl Albert (right).

In 1975 when Richard Fulton was elected mayor to succeed Briley and resigned as Congressman, Allen entered the crowded Democratic primary field in the ensuing special election, and won, beating the incumbent district attorney Thomas Shriver, legislator Mike Murphy, and attorney (later federal Sixth Circuit judge) Gilbert Merritt, largely because of having far more name recognition than any other candidate and because of his populist attack on high rates being charged by local electric and gas utilities. As the Republicans had by this time given up on making serious bids for a district they hadn't won since Reconstruction, his victory in the special general election was a foregone conclusion, and he took office on November 25, 1975.

Once in Congress, Allen tried immediately to establish a high profile for a freshman legislator, to the consternation of some and the disdain of others. His primary issue was the higher electricity rates being charged by the Tennessee Valley Authority, primarily in order to finance its ambitious nuclear energy program. Allen called for the adoption by the TVA of "lifeline rates", a low, subsidized rate for low-income, low-volume electric users who would essentially be subsidized by the utility's major customers. TVA management objected vehemently to Allen's proposal, stating that it violated provisions of the TVA Self-Financing Act of 1959 which required all of the agency's power operations to be self-financing and unsubsidized, and would further dissuade new large customers from moving into its service area as opposed to adjoining areas where they would not be subject to such a scheme. The idea apparently was well received by a majority of Nashville-area voters, however; Allen was elected to a full term in November 1976.

However, Allen was regarded by many as increasingly a relic of an earlier era; he tended to address all issues at discursive length in the tradition of Southern country lawyers. In some circles in Washington, he was given the derisive nickname "The Tennessee Talking Horse", as an indication of his perceived verbosity (a title previously held by former Memphis Congressman Dan Kuykendall). Other politicians felt that Allen might be vulnerable in 1978; several filed to run against him in the 1978 Democratic primary. However, only days before the deadline for withdrawing from the primary race, Allen suffered a massive heart attack. All but one of his opponents then withdrew from the race as they were concerned about the possible repercussions of "kicking a man when he is down". On June 11, the day after the withdrawal deadline passed, Allen died. The only candidate who didn't withdraw from the race a few days earlier, State Senator Bill Boner, thus appeared alone on the Democratic primary ballot. While one of the erstwhile opponents, Elliot Ozment, then tried to conduct a write-in campaign, this proved totally futile, and Boner won the nomination, and in effect, election in November.

Allen died at St. Thomas Hospital in Nashville from complications of a heart attack on June 18, 1978, aged 66.

U.S. House of Representatives
Preceded by Richard Fulton	Member of the U.S. House of Representatives from Tennessee's 5th congressional district 1975–1978	Succeeded by Bill Boner
