= Richard Fulton =

American politician (1927–2018)

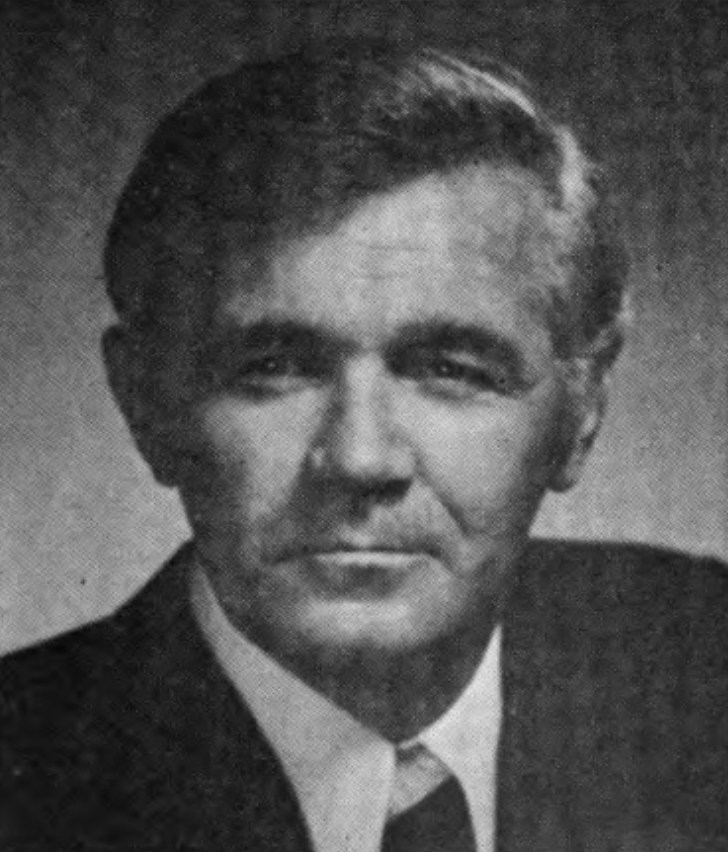

2nd Mayor of Metropolitan Nashville
- In office 1975–1987
- Preceded by: Beverly Briley
- Succeeded by: Bill Boner

41st President of the United States Conference of Mayors
- In office 1983–1984
- Preceded by: Coleman Young
- Succeeded by: Hernán Padilla

Member of the U.S. House of Representatives from Tennessee's 5th district
- In office January 3, 1963 – August 14, 1975
- Preceded by: J. Carlton Loser
- Succeeded by: Clifford Allen

Member of the Tennessee State Senate
- In office 1955–1963

Personal details
- Born: Richard Harmon Fulton; January 27, 1927 Nashville, Tennessee, U.S.
- Died: November 28, 2018 (aged 91) Nashville, Tennessee, U.S.
- Party: Democratic
- Education: University of Tennessee

Richard Harmon Fulton (January 27, 1927 – November 28, 2018) was an American Democratic politician who served as a member of the Tennessee State Senate and of the United States House of Representatives, and the second mayor of the Metropolitan Government of Nashville and Davidson County.

== Personal life ==
Fulton was born in Nashville, Tennessee. He graduated from East Nashville High School and served in the United States Navy in World War II. After returning from his military service, he entered the University of Tennessee where he played for the Volunteers on the football team. He died on November 28, 2018, at a hospice in Nashville at the age of 91.

== Political career ==
=== State Senate ===
In 1954, Fulton was elected to the Tennessee State Senate in place of his brother Lyle, who suddenly died from cancer shortly after receiving the Democratic nomination for that post. Fulton was sworn in on January 3, 1955, but because he was only 27, below the minimum age for Senators under the Tennessee State Constitution, the Senate voted unanimously (28–0) to unseat him. Fulton could not serve in the Senate until he was elected in 1956 at the age of 31. He was reelected to the Senate in 1958, then left politics to begin a career in real estate.

=== Congress ===
In 1962, he entered the Democratic primary for the Nashville-based 5th Congressional District against incumbent Congressman Joseph Carlton Loser. The election commission initially declared Loser the winner; however, a friend of Fulton successfully filed suit to throw out the primary results after The Tennessean reported corruption at the commission. In the rerun of the primary, Fulton defeated Loser and was victorious in November. Fulton voted in favor of the Civil Rights Acts of 1964 and 1968, and the Voting Rights Act of 1965. For the most part, Fulton's voting record in Congress was a liberal one. He resigned from the House after his election as mayor.

=== Mayor of Nashville ===
Fulton served three terms as mayor of Nashville, Tennessee from 1975 until 1987. He was an unsuccessful candidate for the Democratic nomination for governor in 1978 and 1986. In 1999, he embarked on a comeback mayoral bid where he made it to the runoff election, but then withdrew and endorsed his opponent Bill Purcell.

During his tenure as mayor, Fulton was an influential voice in the development of key downtown streets, Riverfront Park, the Nashville Convention Center, the construction of Interstate 440, the expanded use of the Metro Development and Housing Agency and established 485 acres (196 ha) of parks in the city.

From 1983 until 1984, Fulton served as president of the United States Conference of Mayors.

U.S. House of Representatives
| Preceded by J. Carlton Loser | Member of the U.S. House of Representatives from Tennessee's 5th congressional district 1963–1975 | Succeeded by Clifford Allen |
Political offices
| Preceded by Beverly Briley | Mayor of Nashville, Tennessee; 1975–1987 | Succeeded by Bill Boner |
