= Tennessee Democratic Party =

Tennessee affiliate of the U.S. Democratic Party

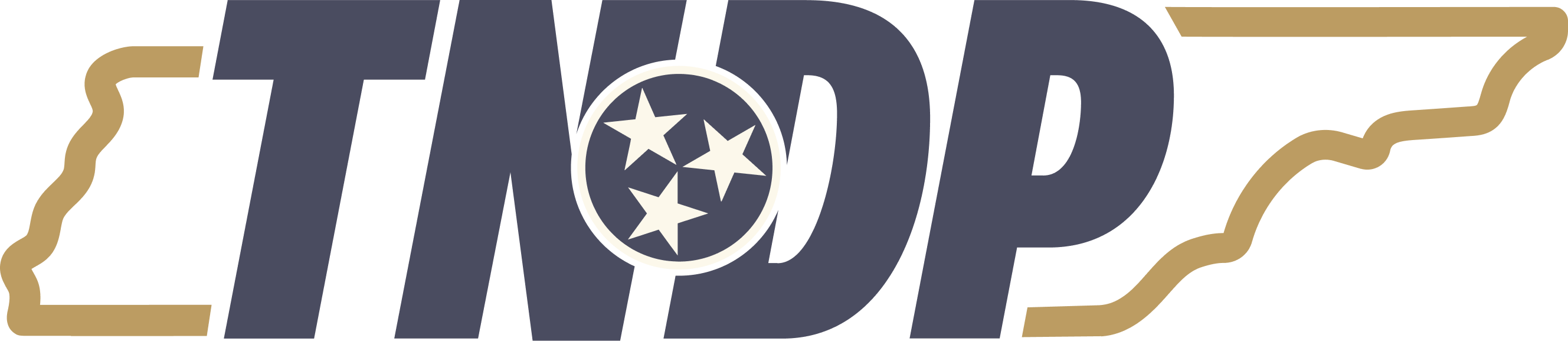
- Abbreviation: TNDP
- Chairperson: Rachel Campbell
- Secretary: Ryan Scofield
- Senate Minority Leader: Raumesh Akbari
- House Minority Leader: Karen Camper
- Founders: Andrew Jackson, John Overton, John H. Eaton, William B. Lewis, Andrew Jackson Donelson, and John Catron
- Founded: 1826; 200 years ago
- Headquarters: 4900 Centennial Blvd. Ste 300, Nashville, Tennessee
- Student wing: Tennessee High School Democrats; Tennessee College Democrats
- Youth wing: Tennessee Young Democrats
- Women's wing: Tennessee Federation of Democratic Women
- National affiliation: Democratic Party
- Colors: Blue
- Seats in the U.S. Senate: 0 / 2
- Seats in the U.S. House: 1 / 9
- Seats in the State Senate: 6 / 33
- Seats in the State House: 24 / 99

Election symbol

Website
- tndp.org

The Tennessee Democratic Party (TNDP) is the affiliate of the Democratic Party in Tennessee. The party was founded in 1826 initially as the Jacksonian Party. The Tennessee Democratic Party was born out of President Andrew Jackson's populist philosophy of Jacksonian democracy in the mid to late-1820s. After Jackson left office, the Democratic Party struggled in the state as the Whig Party would go on to be the dominant party in Tennessee until its collapse after the 1852 Election. Prior to the American Civil War, as a result of the collapse of the former Whig Party, the Democratic Party became the dominant party in the state. After the war ended, the Republican Party would be the dominant political party during Reconstruction, but once Reconstruction ended, the Democratic Party would dominate Tennessee politics up until 2011 when the Republican Party would gain firm control of Tennessee state government.

== History ==
=== Pre–1824 ===
Prior to the rise of Jacksonian Democracy, political parties in Tennessee were really non-existent. Since Tennessee was admitted to the Union in 1796, Tennessee had only voted for the Democratic-Republican Party in each Presidential Election from 1796 to 1820. For the 1824 Presidential Election, Andrew Jackson, a former Military General and then U.S. Senator for Tennessee, decided to run for president against President James Monroe's then Secretary of State John Quincy Adams, the son of former President and founding father John Adams.

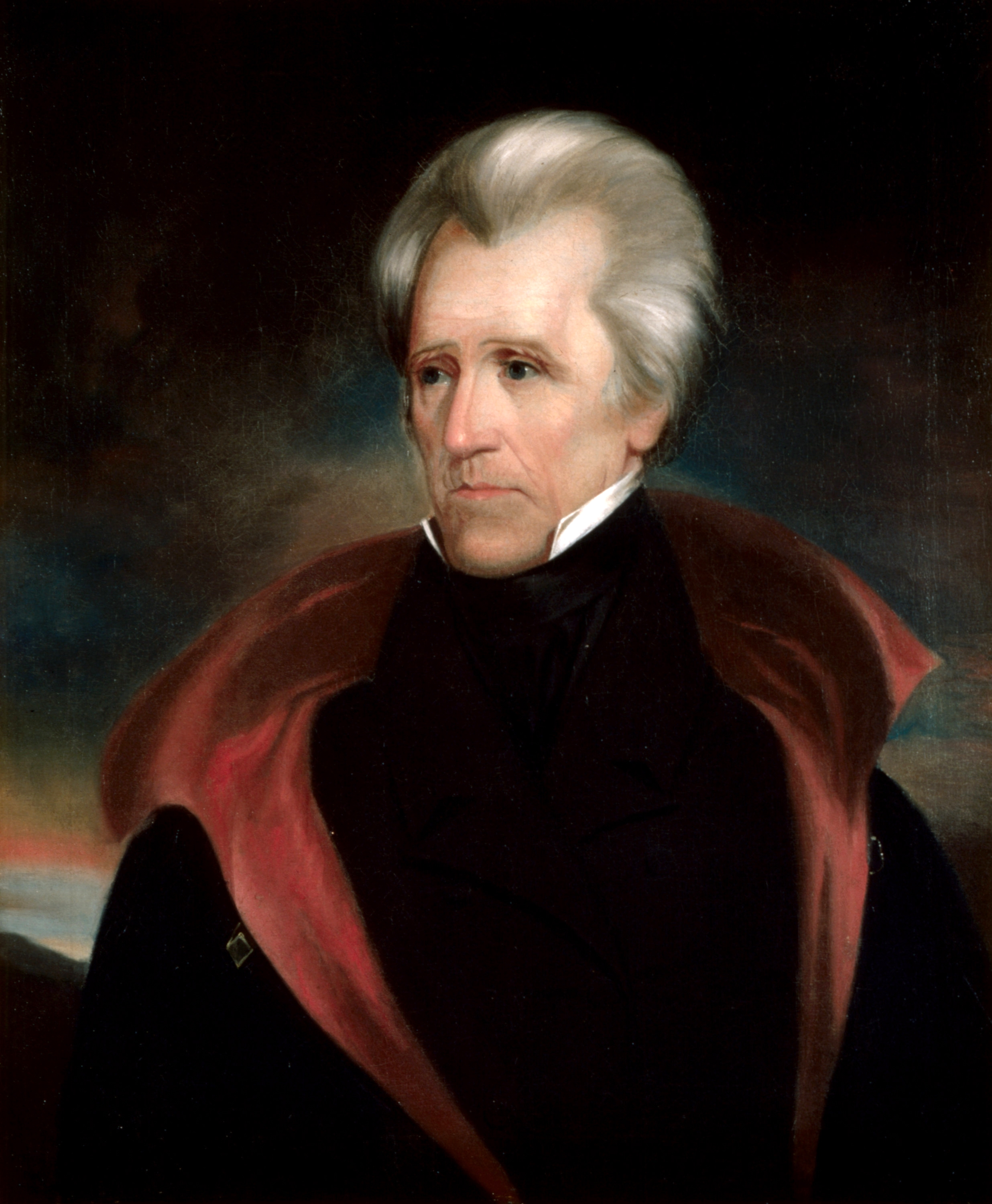
Andrew Jackson, 7th President of the United States

Both Adams and Jackson belonged to the same Party, and that Party had divided out into several different factions with Adams being the Northern faction's nominee and Jackson being the Southern faction's nominee. Jackson would win the popular vote and would have the most electoral votes, but he did not have enough Electoral College votes to win outright. The election went to the House of Representatives where one of the three top vote getters would be elected president. The three were, John Quincy Adams, Andrew Jackson, and Henry Clay of Kentucky. Clay, who was then the Speaker of the House of Representatives, liked Adam's programs for internal improvements so much that he chose to swing his support to Adams, and thus Adams won the vote in the House of Representatives. After Adams was inaugurated, Adams decided to appoint Clay to be his Secretary of State, which outraged Jackson and his supporters.

=== 1824–1860 ===
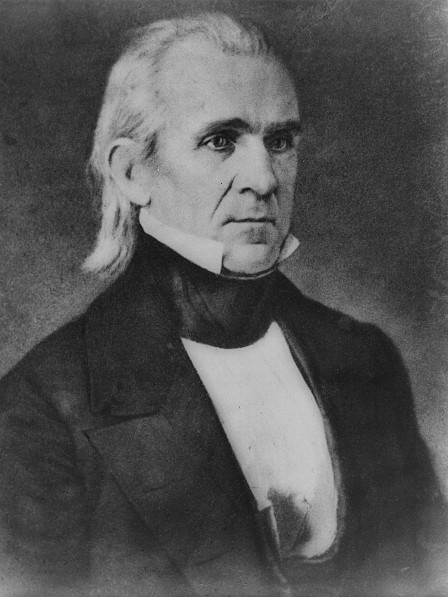
President James K. Polk would win the 1844 election, but voters in Tennessee backed the Whig Candidate, Henry Clay in 1844 over Polk.

Between 1825 and 1826, Jackson's supporters were gearing up to have Jackson run in 1828. While Jackson wouldn't publicly commit to running, he was essentially planning on running to win in 1828. Surrounded by loyal advisors, the Jacksonian Party was formed in 1826 when Jackson supporters began running under the Jacksonian Party. The Jacksonian Party, aided by New York Politician Martin Van Buren, would go on to become the dominant political party in the United States from 1829 to 1839. During this period, the party in Tennessee was still floundering as it did not have any formal party structure for the first few years, however that not matter as long as Jackson was in the White House.

When Jackson retired from the White House, Vice President Martin Van Buren would be Jackson's handpicked successor in the 1836. Now with a formidable opposition party with the Whigs, Jackson's Democratic Party had issues getting Van Buren elected, especially in Jackson's home state of Tennessee. Jackson campaigned heavily for Van Buren, but Tennessee native Senator Hugh Lawson White would actually carry the state's electoral votes over Van Buren. This would start a trend of Tennessee voters only electing Whig Party Candidates in each Presidential Election from the Election of 1836 to the Election of 1852.

For other offices during this time, it was a mix bag of Whigs and Democrats until the Whig Party's collapse in 1854. In 1856, Tennessee would vote for a Democrat for the first time since 1836, when Tennessee voted for James Buchanan for President. By the time the Election of 1860 rolled around, the political climate had dramatically shifted due the sectional strife around the issue of Slavery, and its expansion into the territories. In that election, Tennessee would narrowly vote for the Constitutional Union Party nominee, John Bell due to a majority of Tennesseans supported preserving the Union. By June 1861, Tennessee voters would pass an Ordinance of Secession leading to Tennessee becoming the last Southern state to join the Confederacy.

=== 1860–1945 ===
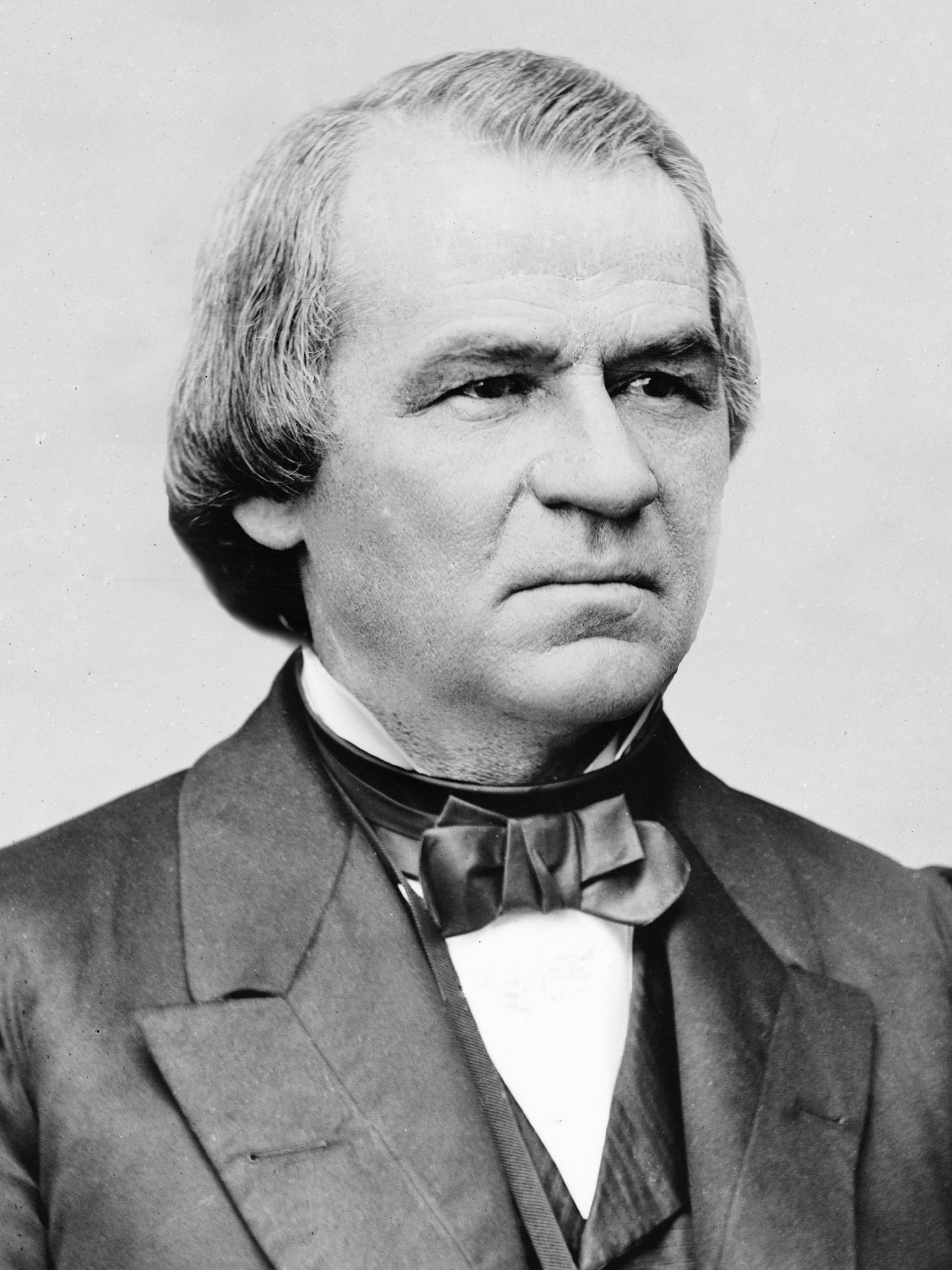
In 1864, President Abraham Lincoln selected Tennessee Democrat Andrew Johnson to be his running mate for the 1864 Presidential Election under the National Union Party ticket. Lincoln would go on to win re-election for a second term, but his second term was cut short when John Wilkes Booth shot and killed President Lincoln at Ford's Theater. Johnson would serve the remainder of Lincoln's term. During his one term in office, he became the first President in US History to be Impeached by the House of Representatives, but he was later acquitted by one vote in a Senate trial. Johnson is currently the last Democrat from Tennessee to be President.

When the Civil War ended, the political landscape had changed in Tennessee. Tennessee had been under military control since February 1862 when Union forces captured the State Capitol of Nashville. When civilian control had returned, aided by a wartime edict by then Military Governor Andrew Johnson that barred Confederate sympathizers from holding political office, the Republican Party took control of Tennessee State Government in March 1865. Along with control of the General Assembly, Republicans controlled the Governor's office for the first time with the election William G. Brownlow.

During the years Republicans had control of the General Assembly, they expanded the right to vote to newly freed slaves, disenfranchised former Confederates, and passed a law that would allow the Governor to declare Martial Law in individual counties in order to combat the influence of the Ku Klux Klan. However, by 1869 Republican dominance in state politics began to subside as Democrats in the state took control of state government. The Democratic Party would then work to undo the reforms enacted by the Brownlow administration over the next few years.

By the time Reconstruction ended in 1877, Democrats were firmly in control of Tennessee Government, but that control came at an ultimate cost to many of the state's African American voters. From the end of the Civil War until the Civil Rights Movement of the 1950s and 1960s, African American's voted exclusively for Republicans, but when Southern Conservative Democrats regained control of Southern Legislatures they would enact a series of racist laws known as Jim Crow Laws, that specifically codified racist views into law. Because of these laws passed after the end of Reconstruction, generations of African American citizens would face extreme racial discrimination in everyday life, the rise of lynching, and the rise of segregation.

Throughout the rest of the 19th century, Tennessee voters would only elect and vote mainly for Democrats to the General Assembly, the Governor's office, and federal offices. Between 1869 and 1900, only two Republicans would be elected Governor of Tennessee those were Dewitt Clinton Senter and Alvin Hawkins. As the 19th century faded into the new 20th century, Tennessee voters still preferred the Democratic Party. However, the new century would test that allegiance to voting straight Democratic.

Around 1900 the Temperance movement had really started to gain momentum in the state, and by 1908 the prohibitionists were had a powerful ally in newspaper publisher Edward Carmack. Carmack was challenging Democratic Governor Malcom Patterson who was against Prohibition, and the election was bitter until the very end when Patterson narrowly beat out Carmack. After the election, Carmack was gunned down in Nashville, and Democratic Governor Malcom Patterson would eventually pardon the man who shot Carmack. As a result of this, Republicans would recapture the Governor's office in 1911 when Republican Ben Hooper was elected.

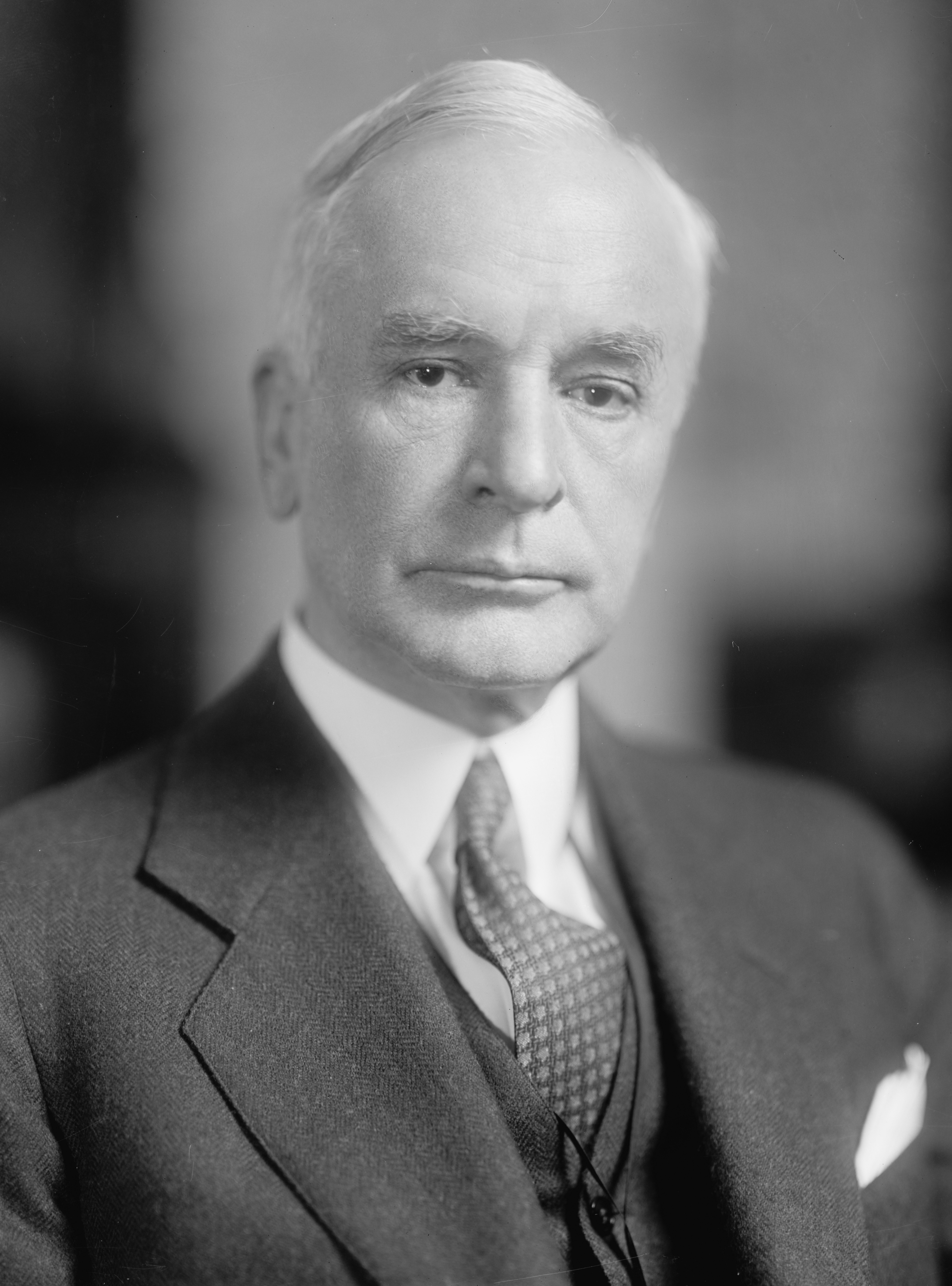
Cordell Hull was appointed Secretary of State by President Franklin D. Roosevelt. Hull would go on to win the Nobel Peace Prize for his contributions to the creation of the United Nations.

By the 1920s Tennessee's Democratic control on both the federal and state level began to crack, when Republican Warren G. Harding become the first Republican candidate for president to carry Tennessee since Ulysses S. Grant in 1868. During the late 20's and early 30's, highly regard members of the Democratic Party in Tennessee began to be recognized on a national level. Jo Byrns from Robertson County became Speaker of the House during President Franklin Roosevelt's administration, and Cordell Hull from Pickett County Tennessee became Secretary of State and was one of the architects behind the creation of the United Nations.

=== 1945–present ===
The Democratic Party in Tennessee was still the dominant party throughout the New Deal era, and gave rise to the political bosses in both Memphis and Nashville. In Memphis, E.H. Crump rose to power using his influence statewide politics to build political power in Memphis and to get folks that he approved of elected to office. He welded a lot of power until the mid-1940s before his influence began to wane and finally ended in the 1950s.

In the 1950s, Tennessee voters began shifting away from the Democratic Party as the Civil Rights Movement began to pick up steam. Since 1952, Tennessee has only voted Democratic in Presidential Election four times in 1964, 1976, 1992, and 1996. Since the late 1960s Republicans began to chip away at the control that the Democratic Party held in the state starting in 1967 when Howard Baker was elected to the US Senate, followed by Bill Brock's election to the US Senate and with the election of Winfield Dunn to the Governor's office in 1971.

Democratic Control continued to wane throughout the remainder of the 20th century as Republicans continued to gain traction with conservatives in the state. By 2000, Tennessee was in the spotlight again, this time for election between then Vice President Al Gore of Carthage, Tennessee and George W. Bush of Texas. Gore campaigned heavily throughout the state, but by the time the polls had closed George W. Bush had picked up the state's electoral votes.

After 2000, the Democratic Party's control continued to slip, and the last time a Democrat won statewide was in 2006 when then Democratic Governor Phil Bredesen had won re-election. After 2011, the Democratic Party was fully out of power for the first time since Reconstruction. Since then, the Party is considered to be irrelevant in Tennessee Politics as Republicans have firm control over state government.

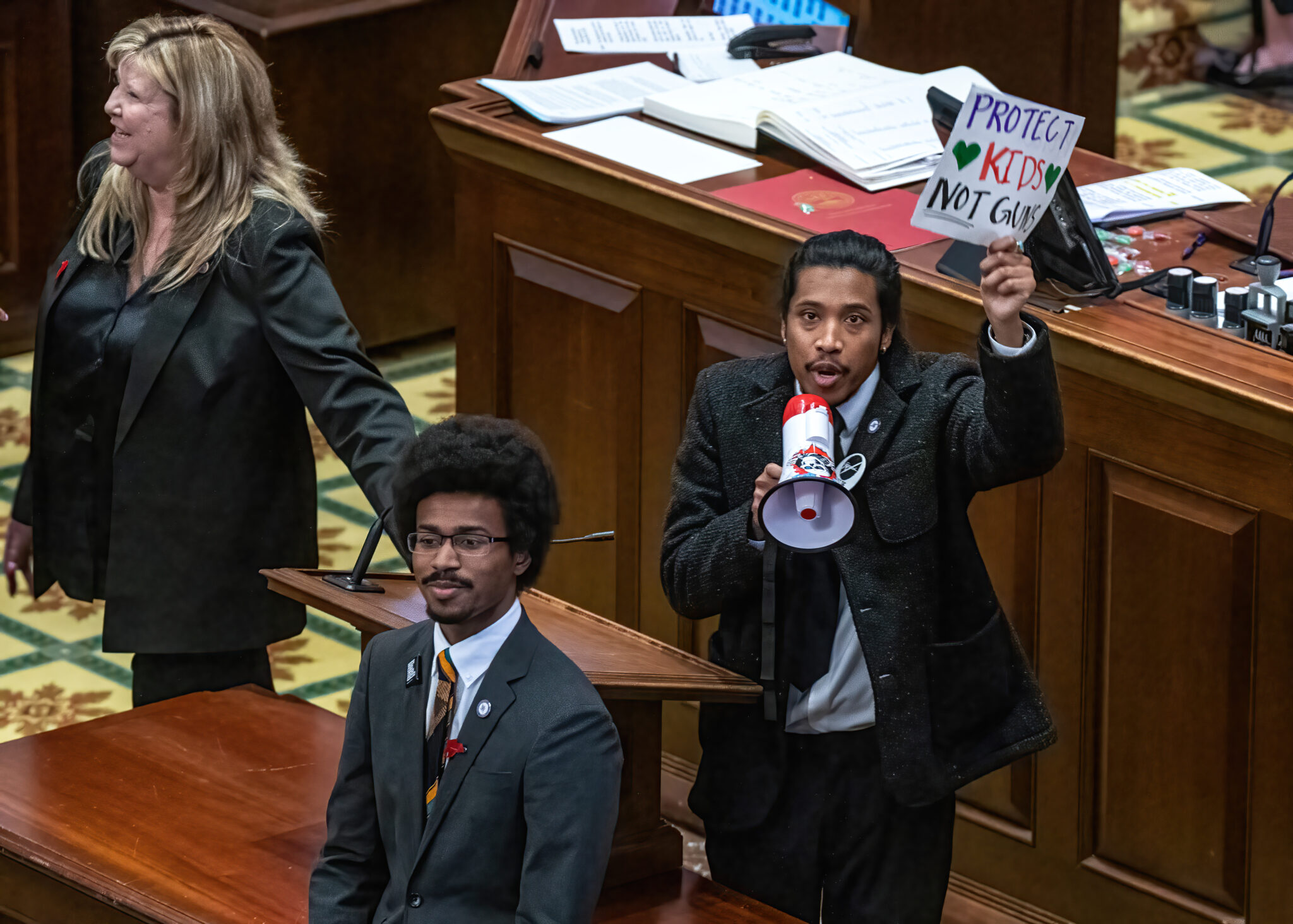
Representatives Justin Jones, Justin J. Pearson, and Gloria Johnson protest for gun reform on the floor of the Tennessee House of Representatives in the wake of the Covenant School shooting in Nashville.

On April 6, 2023, three Democrats Rep. Justin Jones, Rep. Gloria Johnson, and Rep. Justin J. Pearson faced expulsion from the Tennessee House of Representatives, the first since Franklin Republican Jeremy Durham was expelled in 2016. It was over Jones, Pearson, and Johnson's protest for gun violence prevention and them standing in the well of the House. Speaker Cameron Sexton of Crossville compared their protest to the attack on the US Capitol on January 6, 2021. Republicans voted to expel both Justin Jones and Justin J. Pearson from the House, while voting to not expel Knoxville Rep. Gloria Johnson. Subsequently, Jones and Pearson were both sent back to the House by both their local governments and by voters in their respective districts.

After President Joe Biden decided to end his re-election campaign, Tennessee's delegation to the 2024 Democratic National Convention became the first state delegation to endorse Vice President Kamala Harris and her 2024 Presidential Campaign.

== Elected Democratic Officials ==
=== Members of Congress ===
Currently Tennessee's Congressional Delegation contains only one Democrat out of the state's nine U.S. House of Representatives seats. Prior to the 2022 Midterm Elections, the Republican Super Majority redrew Nashville into three Congressional Districts to ensure that they have a significant Super Majority in Tennessee's Congressional delegation. The last time Tennessee's Congressional Delegation had a plurality of Democrats was as recent as 2010 when Tennessee Democrats controlled 5 out of the state's 9 House Seats.

Tennessee Democratic Congressional Delegation
District	Member	Photo
4th	Victoria Broderick (elect)	
9th	Steve Cohen	

=== Statewide Offices ===
Currently Tennessee does not have an elected Democrat statewide. Tennessee has not elected a Democrat statewide since former Governor Phil Bredesen won re-election in 2006.

=== State Legislative Leaders ===
Since 2011, Tennessee Democrats have been in a Super Minority in both the Tennessee House of Representatives and Tennessee Senate. Currently Tennessee Democrats occupy 24 seats in the Tennessee State House and 6 seats in the Tennessee State Senate.

Tennessee House Democratic Leadership
Position	State House District	Member	Photo
Minority Leader	District 87	Karen Camper	Tennessee House Minority Leader Karen Camper (D) – District 87
Caucus Chairman	District 55	John Ray Clemmons	Democratic Caucus Chairman John Ray Clemmons (D) – District 55
Assistant Minority Leader	District 58	Harold Love Jr.	Assistant Minority Leader Harold Love Jr. (D) – District 58
Caucus Vice Chairman	District 56	Bob Freeman	Democratic Caucus Vice Chairman Bob Freeman (D) – District 56
Minority Floor Leader	District 91	Torrey Harris	Minority Floor Leader Torrey Harris (D) – District 91.
Assistant Floor Leader	District 60	Shaundelle Brooks	Assistant Floor Leader Shaundelle Brooks (D) – District 60
Minority Whip	District 15	Sam McKenzie	Minority Whip Sam McKenzie (D) – District 15
Caucus Secretary	District 28	Yusuf Hakeem	Caucus Secretary Yusuf Hakeem (D) - District 28
Caucus Treasurer	District 67	Ronnie Glynn	Democratic Caucus Treasurer Ronnie Glynn (D) – District 67
Minority Leader Pro Tempore	District 88	Larry J. Miller	Minority Leader Pro Tempore Larry J. Miller (D) – District 88

Tennessee Senate Democratic Leadership
Position	State Senate District	Member	Photo
Minority Leader	District 29	Raumesh Akbari	Tennessee Senate Minority Leader Raumesh Akbari (D) – District 29
Caucus Chairman	District 33	London Lamar	Senate Democratic Caucus Chairwoman London Lamar (D) – District 33

=== Mayors ===
- Nashville-Davidson County: Freddie O'Connell
- Memphis: Paul Young
- Shelby County: Lee Harris
- Knoxville: Indya Kincannon
- Clarksville: Joe Pitts

== Party Leadership ==
The Tennessee Democratic Party's leadership consists of a Chair, Vice Chair, Secretary, and Treasurer who are elected by the State Executive Committee. The State's Executive Committee consists of one man and one woman from each State Senate District. On January 25, 2024, the Tennessee Democratic Party's State Executive Committee elected Rachel Campbell to be Chair of the Tennessee Democratic Party, along with Dr. J. Nathan Higdon as Vice Chair, Ryan Scofield as Secretary, and Carol V. Abney as Treasurer.

- Chairman – Rachel Campbell
- Vice Chairwoman – J. Nathan Higdon, PhD
- Treasurer – Randall Rice (interim)
- Secretary – Ryan Scofield
- Tennessee Senate Caucus Leader – Sen. London Lamar
- Tennessee House Caucus Leader – Rep. John Ray Clemmons
- East Tennessee Regional Vice Chairs
  - Terry Marek (Sullivan County/District 4)
  - Debbie Harley-McClaskey (Washington County/District 3)
- Middle Tennessee Regional Vice Chairs
  - Jody Barnwell Smith (Williamson County/District 27)
  - vacant
- West Tennessee Regional Vice Chairs
  - Tammy Floyd-Wade (Gibson County/District 24)
  - Dave Cambron (Shelby County/District 31)

== State Executive Committee ==
The Tennessee Democratic Party's Executive Committee consists of 66 elected members from each of Tennessee's 33 Senatorial Districts. Currently the Executive Committee has seven ex-officio members that represents groups that "facilitate communication between the bodies and to advance goals of Democrats in the State of Tennessee."

Elected Members of the Tennessee Democratic Party's State Executive Committee
State Senate District	Male Committee Member	Term	Female Committee Member	Term
District 1	Kevin Kerr	Ending August 2030	Christine Brady	Ending August 2030
District 2	J. Nathan Higdon, PhD	Ending August 2030	Sue Dubois	Ending August 2030
District 3	Brad Batt	Ending August 2030	Brittany A. Lowder	Ending August 2030
District 4	Terry Marek	Ending August 2030	Lori Love	Ending August 2030
District 5	David A. Garcia	Ending August 2030	Anne Backus	Ending August 2030
District 6	Jim Clement	Ending August 2030	Amanda Collins	Ending August 2030
District 7	Will Bowen	Ending August 2030	Dana Moran	Ending August 2030
District 8	Christopher Parker	Ending August 2030	Autumn Anderson	Ending August 2030
District 9	Joshua Franklin	Ending August 2030	Sara Thompson	Ending August 2030
District 10	Chris Anderson	Ending August 2030	Heather McClendon	Ending August 2030
District 11	Tahcere Alexander	Ending August 2030	Lisa Crowder	Ending August 2030
District 12	Derek Hawn	Ending August 2030	Carol V. Abney	Ending August 2030
District 13	Brendan L. Doughtie	Ending August 2030	Katrina Aguilar	Ending August 2030
District 14	Matt Ferry	Ending August 2030	Cynthia A. Crieger	Ending August 2030
District 15	Troy Smith	Ending August 2030	Sara Kruszka	Ending August 2030
District 16	Andrew Head	Ending August 2030	Victoria Broderick	Ending August 2030
District 17	Richie Mercado	Ending August 2030	Melissa Alvarez	Ending August 2030
District 18	Tyler Templeton	Ending August 2030	Megan Lange	Ending August 2030
District 19	Josh Wesley	Ending August 2030	Marcia Masulla	Ending August 2030
District 20	Tyler Brasher	Ending August 2030	Lee Jones	Ending August 2030
District 21	Dakota Galban	Ending August 2030		Ending August 2030
District 22	Rodney Mills	Ending August 2030	K'Prience "Bre" London	Ending August 2030
District 23	Mark Conwell	Ending August 2030		Ending August 2030
District 24		Ending August 2030	Tammy Floyd-Wade	Ending August 2030
District 25	Byron Elam	Ending August 2030	Tina Mercer	Ending August 2030
District 26	Charles B. Watkins, Sr.	Ending August 2030	Civil Miller-Watkins	Ending August 2030
District 27	Matthew R. McLarnon	Ending August 2030	Jody Barnwell Smith	Ending August 2030
District 28	Seth Campbell	Ending August 2030	Vicki Hale	Ending August 2030
District 29	Darrick Harris	Ending August 2030	Allison Brownlee	Ending August 2030
District 30	Allan Creasy	Ending August 2030	Jasmine Boyd-Wilson	Ending August 2030
District 31	David Holt	Ending August 2030	Rosemary Winters	Ending August 2030
District 32	Gregory W. Patrick	Ending August 2030	Regina Nash	Ending August 2030
District 33	Jon Carroll	Ending August 2030	Adrienne Davis	Ending August 2030

== Democratic National Committee Members ==
- Rachel Campbell– Chair
- J. Nathan Higdon, PhD – Vice Chair
- Bill Owen – East Tennessee
- Carol V. Abney, CPA – Middle Tennessee
- Deborah Reed – West Tennessee
- Ray Curry
- David Wilhelm

== Election results ==
=== Federal ===
==== U.S. House ====
Election	Votes	%	Seats (TN)	±	%
2016	814,181	34.05	2 / 9	0	1.35
2018	846,450	39.19	2 / 9	0	5.86
2020	1,105,537	38.90	2 / 9	0	0.29
2022	581,902	34.02	1 / 9	▼1	4.88
2024	977,870	33.41	1 / 9	0	0.61
2026	896,349	44.12	1 / 9	0	10.45

=== State ===
Governor
Election	Candidate	Votes	%	Result
1950	Gordon Browning	184,437	78.09%	Won ✓
1952	Frank G. Clement	640,290	79.37%	Won ✓
1954	Frank G. Clement	281,291	87.20%	Won ✓
1958	Buford Ellington	248,874	57.54%	Won ✓
1962	Frank G. Clement	315,648	50.85%	Won ✓
1966	Buford Ellington	532,998	81.18%	Won ✓
1970	John Jay Hooker	509,521	45.98%	Lost ✗
1974	Ray Blanton	576,833	55.43%	Won ✓
1978	Jake Butcher	523,495	44.16%	Lost ✗
1982	Randy Tyree	500,937	40.44%	Lost ✗
1986	Ned McWherter	656,602	54.26%	Won ✓
1990	Ned McWherter	479,990	44.27%	Won ✓
1994	Phil Bredesen	664,252	44.67%	Lost ✗
1998	John Jay Hooker	287,750	29.48%	Lost ✗
2002	Phil Bredesen	837,284	50.65%	Won ✓
2006	Phil Bredesen	1,247,491	68.60%	Won ✓
2010	Mike McWherter	529,851	33.08%	Lost ✗
2014	Charles Brown	309,237	22.84%	Lost ✗
2018	Karl Dean	864,863	38.55%	Lost ✗
2022	Jason Martin	572,818	32.92%	Lost ✗
2026	Jerri Green	902,953	42.95%	Lost ✗

== See also ==
- Tennessee Republican Party
- Political party strength in Tennessee
