= 2014 Tennessee gubernatorial election =

- November 4, 2014
- Turnout: 35.97% ▼5.35 pp
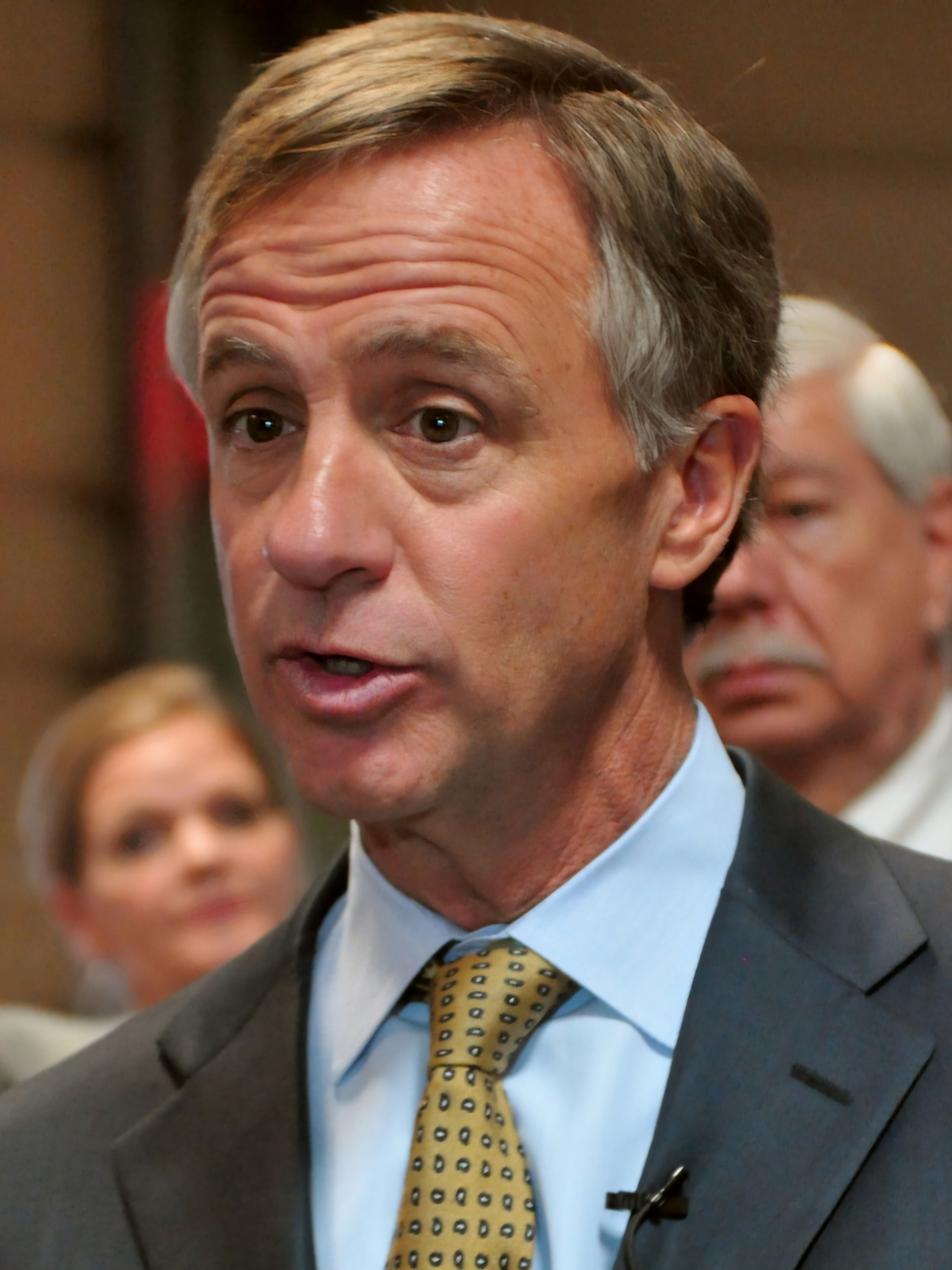

Nominee	Bill Haslam	Charles Brown
Party	Republican	Democratic
Popular vote	951,796	309,237
Percentage	70.31%	22.84%
- Haslam: 30–40% 40–50% 50–60% 60–70% 70–80% 80–90% 90% Brown: 30–40% 40–50% 50–60% 60–70% 70–80% 80–90% Tie: 50% No data
Governor before election
Bill Haslam
Republican
Elected Governor
Bill Haslam
Republican

The 2014 Tennessee gubernatorial election took place on November 4, 2014, to elect the governor of Tennessee, alongside other state and local elections. Incumbent Republican governor Bill Haslam was re-elected to a second term with 70.3% of the vote, defeating his Democratic challenger Charles Brown. Improving on his performance from 2010, Haslam also carried every county in the state. It was the largest margin of victory for any candidate in the 2014 gubernatorial elections.

The primary elections took place on August 7, 2014, with Republican Bill Haslam and Democrat Charles Brown winning their respective party nominations.

With no political experience, Charles Brown campaigned on raising speed limits on the interstate highways to 80 mph and putting the Bible back in schools. Some of the Tennessee Democratic Party members became concerned over Brown's candidacy when he said in an interview that he would like to put Bill Haslam in an electric chair and "turn it on about half throttle and let him smell a little bit."

Haslam, on the other hand, campaigned on jobs, economic development, education reform, workforce development, and conservative fiscal leadership.

As of 2026, this was the best performance in a Tennessee gubernatorial election since Buford Ellington's victory in 1966. This was also the last time a Republican candidate has won Davidson and Shelby counties in a statewide election.

== Republican primary ==
=== Candidates ===
==== Declared ====
- Basil Marceaux, perennial candidate
- Bill Haslam, incumbent governor
- Donald McFolin, Independent candidate for governor in 2010
- Mark "Coonrippy" Brown

==== Declined ====
- John Jay Hooker, political gadfly and Democratic nominee for governor in 1970 and 1998 (ran as an independent)

=== Results ===
Results by county Haslam: 70–80%; 80–90%; >90%

Republican primary results
Party	Candidate	Votes	%
Republican	Bill Haslam (incumbent)	570,997	87.68%
Republican	Mark "Coonrippy" Brown	44,165	6.78%
Republican	Donald Ray McFolin	22,968	3.53%
Republican	Basil Marceaux, Sr.	13,117	2.01%
Total votes		651,247	100.00%

== Democratic primary ==
=== Candidates ===
==== Declared ====
- Charles V. Brown, retired engineer and candidate for governor in 2002
- Kennedy Spellman Johnson
- John McKamey, former Sullivan County Commissioner
- Ron Noonan

==== Removed from ballot ====
- Mark E. Clayton, Vice President of Public Advocate of the United States and nominee for U.S. Senate in 2012
- Jesse Gore
- Ed Borum

==== Declined ====
- Lowe Finney, state senator
- Craig Fitzhugh, minority leader of the Tennessee House of Representatives
- Roy Herron, chairman of the Tennessee Democratic Party, former state senator and nominee for Tennessee's 8th congressional district in 2010
- John Jay Hooker, political gadfly and nominee for governor in 1970 and 1998 (ran as an independent)
- Jim Kyle, state senator and candidate for governor in 2010
- Sara Kyle, former director of the Tennessee Regulatory Authority
- Mike McWherter, businessman, attorney and nominee for governor in 2010

=== Results ===
Results by county: Brown: 30–40%; 40–50%; 50–60%; McKamey: 30–40% 40–50%; 50–60%; 60–70%

Democratic primary results
Party	Candidate	Votes	%
Democratic	Charles V. "Charlie" Brown	95,114	41.71%
Democratic	Wm. H. "John" McKamey	59,200	25.96%
Democratic	Kennedy Spellman Johnson	55,718	24.44%
Democratic	Ron Noonan	17,993	7.89%
Total votes		228,025	100.00%

== Independents and Third Parties ==
=== Candidates ===
==== Declared ====
- Steven Coburn (Independent)
- Shaun Crowell (Constitution)
- John Jay Hooker (Independent), political gadfly and Democratic nominee for governor in 1970 and 1998
- Isa Infante (Green)
- Daniel T. Lewis (Libertarian), educator and nominee for the U.S. Senate in 2008

==== Removed from ballot ====
- Jondavid Balunek (Independent)
- J. D. Ellis (Independent)

== General election ==
=== Predictions ===
Source	Ranking	As of
The Cook Political Report	Solid R	November 3, 2014
Sabato's Crystal Ball	Safe R	November 3, 2014
Rothenberg Political Report	Safe R	November 3, 2014
Real Clear Politics	Safe R	November 3, 2014

=== Polling ===
Poll source	Date(s) administered	Sample size	Margin of error	Bill Haslam (R)	Charles Brown (D)	Other	Undecided
CBS News/NYT/YouGov	October 16–23, 2014	974	± 5%	58%	30%	2%	11%
CBS News/NYT/YouGov	September 20–October 1, 2014	1,007	± 4%	60%	28%	1%	11%
CBS News/NYT/YouGov	August 18–September 2, 2014	1,056	± 4%	56%	29%	4%	11%
Rasmussen Reports	August 11–12, 2014	750	± 3%	55%	30%	6%	9%

Hypothetical polling

Poll source	Date(s) administered	Sample size	Margin of error	Bill Haslam (R)	John McKamey (D)	Other	Undecided
CBS News/NYT/YouGov	July 5–24, 2014	1,460	± 5.4%	55%	32%	4%	9%
Rasmussen Reports	April 29–30, 2014	750	± 4%	57%	27%	5%	11%

=== Results ===

2014 Tennessee gubernatorial election
Party	Candidate	Votes	%	±%
Republican	Bill Haslam (incumbent)	951,796	70.31%	+5.28%
Democratic	Charles Brown	309,237	22.84%	−10.24%
Independent	John Jay Hooker	30,579	2.26%	N/A
Constitution	Shaun Crowell	26,580	1.96%	N/A
Green	Isa Infante	18,570	1.37%	N/A
Independent	Steve Coburn	8,612	0.64%	N/A
Independent	Daniel Lewis	8,321	0.62%	N/A
n/a	Write-ins	33	0.00%	0.00%
Total votes		1,353,728	100.00%	N/A
Republican hold				

=== By county ===
By county

County	Bill Haslam Republican		Charles Brown Democratic		Other votes		Total votes
County	%	#	%	#	%	#	Total votes
Anderson	75.27%	13,367	17.86%	3,171	6.87%	1,220	17,758
Bedford	75.98%	5,653	16.49%	1,227	7.53%	560	7,440
Benton	64.73%	2,415	26.56%	991	8.71%	325	3,731
Bledsoe	69.41%	1,786	24.10%	620	6.49%	167	2,573
Blount	79.75%	23,653	14.06%	4,171	6.19%	1,836	29,660
Bradley	83.19%	16,709	12.59%	2,528	4.22%	848	20,085
Campbell	77.42%	4,981	17.80%	1,145	4.79%	308	6,434
Cannon	71.37%	1,977	19.71%	546	8.92%	247	2,770
Carroll	69.54%	4,313	23.06%	1,430	7.40%	459	6,202
Carter	77.72%	8,376	14.20%	1,530	8.08%	871	10,777
Cheatham	72.63%	6,191	18.01%	1,535	9.36%	798	8,524
Chester	78.58%	2,659	15.07%	510	6.35%	215	3,384
Claiborne	76.20%	4,015	17.99%	948	5.81%	306	5,269
Clay	66.64%	963	26.16%	378	7.20%	104	1,445
Cocke	78.30%	5,615	14.39%	1,032	7.31%	524	7,171
Coffee	73.11%	7,986	18.38%	2,008	8.50%	929	10,923
Crockett	75.84%	2,222	19.04%	558	5.12%	150	2,930
Cumberland	79.01%	12,978	15.48%	2,543	5.51%	905	16,426
Davidson	53.50%	71,661	35.41%	47,438	11.09%	14,854	133,953
Decatur	71.29%	1,634	22.25%	510	6.46%	148	2,292
Dekalb	67.85%	2,423	23.35%	834	8.79%	314	3,571
Dickson	69.09%	6,830	23.24%	2,297	7.67%	758	9,885
Dyer	77.75%	5,710	15.82%	1,162	6.43%	472	7,344
Fayette	77.14%	8,141	18.72%	1,976	4.14%	437	10,554
Fentress	73.20%	2,371	19.05%	617	7.75%	251	3,239
Franklin	70.99%	6,595	21.77%	2,022	7.24%	673	9,290
Gibson	70.31%	7,819	20.68%	2,300	9.00%	1,001	11,120
Giles	70.94%	3,922	22.23%	1,229	6.84%	378	5,529
Grainger	78.93%	3,274	15.31%	635	5.76%	239	4,148
Greene	76.27%	10,146	15.92%	2,118	7.80%	1,038	13,302
Grundy	64.83%	1,556	26.88%	645	8.29%	199	2,400
Hamblen	80.98%	8,978	13.66%	1,515	5.36%	594	11,087
Hamilton	71.26%	56,750	24.44%	19,462	4.31%	3,429	79,641
Hancock	73.48%	676	18.04%	166	8.48%	78	920
Hardeman	59.14%	2,891	37.01%	1,809	3.85%	188	4,888
Hardin	80.12%	4,046	15.13%	764	4.75%	240	5,050
Hawkins	79.77%	8,730	14.39%	1,575	5.84%	639	10,944
Haywood	57.52%	1,940	39.76%	1,341	2.73%	92	3,373
Henderson	76.90%	3,836	15.84%	790	7.26%	362	4,988
Henry	72.77%	5,297	21.06%	1,533	6.17%	449	7,279
Hickman	69.18%	2,956	22.84%	976	7.98%	341	4,273
Houston	56.11%	1,005	35.40%	634	8.49%	152	1,791
Humphreys	60.18%	2,512	28.77%	1,201	11.04%	461	4,174
Jackson	63.75%	1,451	26.85%	611	9.40%	214	2,276
Jefferson	80.70%	8,423	13.13%	1,370	6.18%	645	10,438
Johnson	78.30%	2,547	14.88%	484	6.82%	222	3,253
Knox	77.05%	78,571	15.68%	15,986	7.28%	7,419	101,976
Lake	54.08%	629	35.17%	409	10.75%	125	1,163
Lauderdale	64.95%	2,652	29.41%	1,201	5.63%	230	4,083
Lawrence	73.43%	6,264	19.70%	1,681	6.87%	586	8,531
Lewis	71.07%	1,857	20.32%	531	8.61%	225	2,613
Lincoln	75.70%	4,720	17.27%	1,077	7.02%	438	6,235
Loudon	83.68%	12,015	11.21%	1,610	5.11%	734	14,359
Macon	76.96%	2,436	15.27%	483	7.77%	246	3,165
Madison	64.64%	14,563	29.47%	6,640	5.89%	1,328	22,531
Marion	68.23%	4,233	27.16%	1,685	4.61%	286	6,204
Marshall	72.06%	4,279	20.61%	1,224	7.33%	435	5,938
Maury	69.26%	12,790	22.45%	4,145	8.29%	1,531	18,466
McMinn	79.07%	8,120	16.11%	1,654	4.83%	496	10,270
McNairy	75.14%	4,019	19.29%	1,032	5.57%	298	5,349
Meigs	74.47%	1,683	19.42%	439	6.11%	138	2,260
Monroe	77.10%	7,567	18.22%	1,788	4.69%	460	9,815
Montgomery	69.45%	20,185	24.34%	7,073	6.21%	1,805	29,063
Moore	73.16%	1,145	19.55%	306	7.28%	114	1,565
Morgan	67.97%	2,453	26.66%	962	5.38%	194	3,609
Obion	67.03%	4,428	20.72%	1,369	12.25%	809	6,606
Overton	65.74%	2,613	25.79%	1,025	8.48%	337	3,975
Perry	67.21%	945	23.26%	327	9.53%	134	1,406
Pickett	71.63%	1,154	20.36%	328	8.01%	129	1,611
Polk	71.35%	2,505	23.61%	829	5.04%	177	3,511
Putnam	72.73%	10,425	19.03%	2,727	8.24%	1,181	14,333
Rhea	81.00%	4,792	14.76%	873	4.24%	251	5,916
Roane	76.91%	10,310	16.25%	2,178	6.84%	917	13,405
Robertson	73.81%	10,177	18.14%	2,501	8.06%	1,111	13,789
Rutherford	70.14%	36,467	21.78%	11,323	8.09%	4,204	51,994
Scott	75.09%	2,318	20.41%	630	4.50%	139	3,087
Sequatchie	77.85%	2,418	17.68%	549	4.48%	139	3,106
Sevier	82.40%	15,400	11.80%	2,205	5.80%	1,084	18,689
Shelby	57.80%	107,089	37.35%	69,193	4.85%	8,981	185,263
Smith	65.92%	2,720	25.40%	1,048	8.68%	358	4,126
Stewart	67.04%	1,999	25.49%	760	7.48%	223	2,982
Sullivan	81.05%	26,837	13.29%	4,399	5.67%	1,876	33,112
Sumner	76.74%	28,090	16.72%	6,121	6.53%	2,391	36,602
Tipton	77.91%	9,636	17.01%	2,104	5.08%	628	12,368
Trousdale	65.38%	965	26.56%	392	8.06%	119	1,476
Unicoi	76.31%	2,999	15.17%	596	8.52%	335	3,930
Union	76.93%	2,311	17.31%	520	5.76%	173	3,004
Van Buren	59.72%	903	31.94%	483	8.33%	126	1,512
Warren	70.06%	5,285	21.85%	1,648	8.09%	610	7,543
Washington	74.94%	19,707	17.06%	4,485	8.00%	2,104	26,296
Wayne	77.67%	2,122	15.48%	423	6.84%	187	2,732
Weakley	69.00%	5,082	21.72%	1,600	9.27%	683	7,365
White	70.69%	4,030	21.29%	1,214	8.02%	457	5,701
Williamson	79.72%	45,329	13.19%	7,501	7.09%	4,030	56,860
Wilson	75.95%	22,580	17.07%	5,075	6.98%	2,076	29,731

==== Counties that flipped from Democratic to Republican ====
- Davidson (largest city: Nashville)
- Haywood (largest city: Brownsville)
- Houston (largest city: Erin)
- Lake (largest municipality: Tiptonville)
- Shelby (largest city: Memphis)

== See also ==
- 2014 United States Senate election in Tennessee
- 2014 Tennessee Amendment 1
- 2014 Tennessee elections
