= Benjamin Barton =

Benjamin Barton may refer to:

- Benjamin H. Barton, American legal scholar
- Benjamin Barton (speaker) (1645–1720), American politician from Rhode Island
- Benjamin Smith Barton (1766–1815), American botanist, naturalist, and physician
- Ben Barton (1823–1899), early white settler of the San Bernardino Valley
