= 1920 Tennessee gubernatorial election =

- November 2, 1920
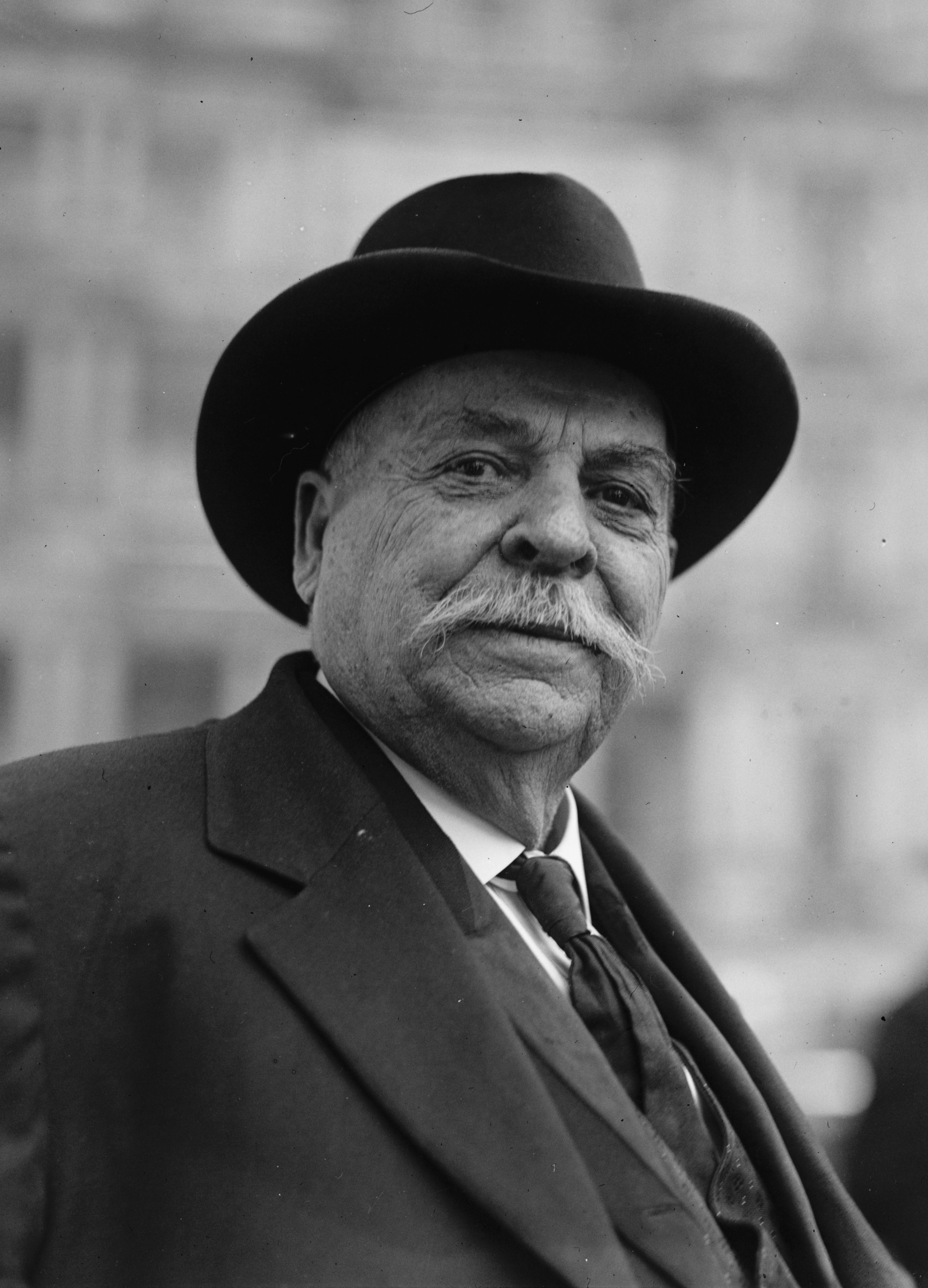

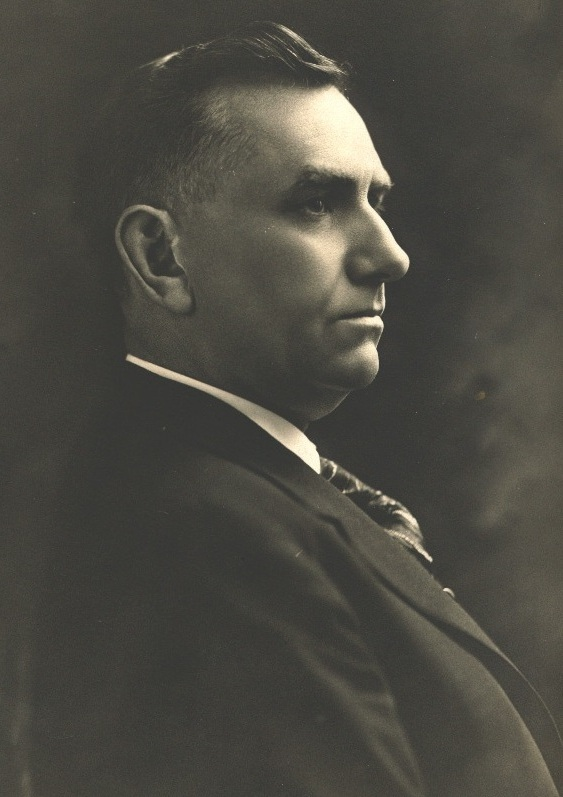
Nominee	Alfred A. Taylor	Albert H. Roberts
Party	Republican	Democratic
Popular vote	229,133	185,890
Percentage	54.93%	44.56%
- County results Taylor: 40–50% 50–60% 60–70% 70–80% 80–90% >90% Roberts: 50–60% 60–70% 70–80% 80–90% >90%
Governor before election
Albert H. Roberts
Democratic
Elected Governor
Alfred A. Taylor
Republican

The 1920 Tennessee gubernatorial election was held on November 2, 1920. Republican nominee Alfred A. Taylor, brother of former governor Robert Love Taylor, defeated Incumbent Democratic governor Albert H. Roberts with 54.9% of the vote.

Roberts alienated a significant portion of his party by enacting unpopular tax reforms and helping ratify the 19th Amendment (which gave women the right to vote). Taylor also supported the 19th Amendment, but he campaigned primarily against Roberts' tax reforms. This was the state's first gubernatorial election in which women could vote.

Before this election, Alfred A. Taylor ran for governor in 1886, which he lost to his brother. After this election, no Republican would win a Tennessee gubernatorial election until Winfield Dunn won in 1970.

== Primary elections ==
Primary elections were held on August 5, 1920.

=== Democratic primary ===
==== Candidates ====
- Albert H. Roberts, incumbent governor
- W. H. Crabtree
- John Randolph Neal Jr., attorney
- W. L. Wirt

==== Results ====
Democratic primary results
Party	Candidate	Votes	%
Democratic	Albert H. Roberts (incumbent)	67,886	59.56%
Democratic	W. H. Crabtree	44,853	39.35%
Democratic	John Randolph Neal Jr.	957	0.84%
Democratic	W. L. Wirt	276	0.24%
Total votes		113,972	100.00%

== General election ==
=== Candidates ===
Major party candidates

- Alfred A. Taylor, Republican
- Albert H. Roberts, Democratic

Other candidates

- J. M. Lindsley, Socialist

=== Results ===
1920 Tennessee gubernatorial election
Party	Candidate	Votes	%	±%
Republican	Alfred A. Taylor	229,133	54.93%	+17.29
Democratic	Albert H. Roberts (incumbent)	185,890	44.56%	−17.81
Socialist	J. M. Lindsley	2,113	0.51%	N/A
Majority		43,243	10.37%	N/A
Turnout		417,136	100.00%	N/A
Republican gain from Democratic		Swing		

== See also ==
- 1920 United States presidential election in Tennessee
