= John Jay Hooker =

American lawyer

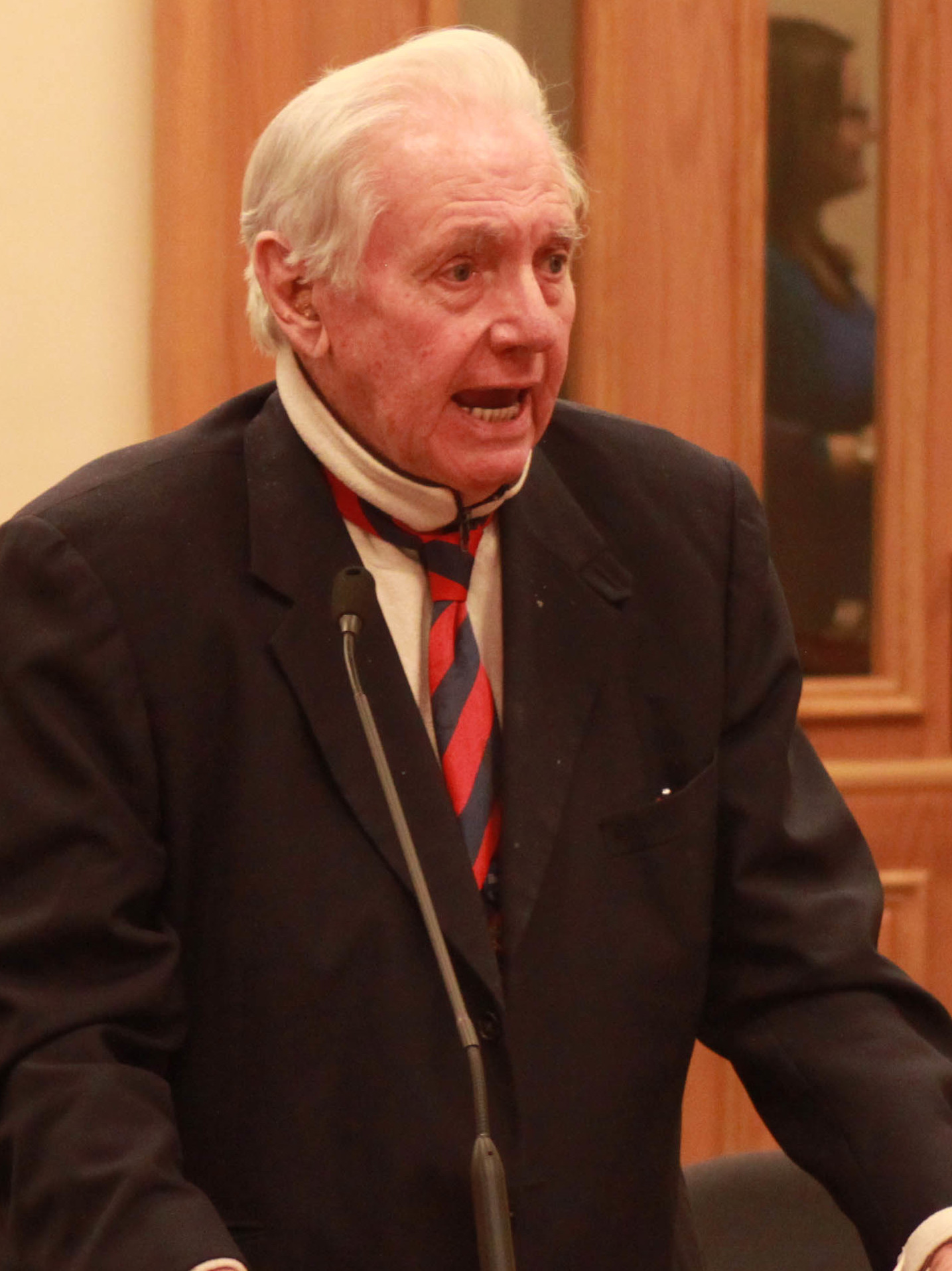
- Hooker in 2014

Personal details
- Born: August 24, 1930 Nashville, Tennessee, U.S.
- Died: January 24, 2016 (aged 85) Nashville, Tennessee, U.S.
- Party: Democratic (before 2004); Independent (2004–2016)
- Spouse: Tish Fort
- Children: 4
- Education: University of the South (BA); Vanderbilt University (LLB)

John Jay Hooker, Jr. (August 24, 1930 – January 24, 2016) was an American attorney, entrepreneur, political gadfly and perennial candidate from Nashville, Tennessee, who was the Democratic nominee for Governor of Tennessee in 1970 and 1998.

== Early life ==
John Jay Hooker was born to relative wealth in one of the Nashville area's more prominent families in 1930. His father, John Jay Hooker, Sr., was an attorney, as is John Jay's brother, Henry Hooker, who became his law partner in the former firm of Hooker, Hooker, and Willis. Hooker was a direct descendant of William Blount, who signed the Constitution of the United States and who was appointed by President George Washington in 1790 to be the "Governor of all the lands south of the Ohio River". In 1796, Governor Blount was elected the president of the Constitutional Convention of Tennessee.

== Legal career ==
Hooker attended Sewanee Military Academy (now St. Andrew's-Sewanee School) and graduated from Nashville's Montgomery Bell Academy. Hooker attended college at the University of the South in Sewanee, Tennessee. He then served two years in the United States Army Judge Advocate General's Corps as an investigator. Upon discharge from the service, Hooker attended Vanderbilt University Law School. He graduated and was admitted to the Tennessee bar in 1957. He then practiced law with his father in the law firm of Hooker, Keeble, Dodson, and Harris, one of the most prominent law firms in Tennessee. In 1960, Hooker left his father's law firm to start a new law firm and one year later was joined by his brother Henry Hooker, and two years later by William R. Willis, forming the law firm of Hooker, Hooker, and Willis, which eventually became a ten-man law firm. This firm became the general counsel of the Nashville Tennessean and several other businesses by the time Hooker ran for governor in 1966. Struck by the inequalities in the southern society that confronted him at the time, he became identified as a young man with progressive Democratic politics. While practicing law, he also began a series of diverse business investments.

In 1958, Tennessee Governor Frank G. Clement asked Hooker and prominent Nashville attorney Jack Norman Sr. to become involved in the state's investigation of Raulston Schoolfield, an allegedly corrupt Chattanooga state judge. Based on the Norman/Hooker findings, the Tennessee House of Representatives voted to impeach Schoolfield. Norman and Hooker were then retained to prosecute Schoolfield before the Tennessee State Senate, which convicted him on several counts. At the time, Robert F. Kennedy was general counsel of the U.S. Senate Select Committee on Improper Activities in Labor and Management, which was investigating labor corruption. In this capacity, Kennedy launched an investigation of Raulston Schoolfield. Kennedy came to Tennessee and testified in the Schoolfield impeachment trial. Thereafter, he and Hooker became close friends and remained so until the time of Kennedy's assassination in 1968.

== Political career ==
In 1959, Hooker married the former Eugenia "Tish" Fort. They had three children, Dara, Kendall, and Blount, who was named after William Blount; he also had a son by a second marriage, James Thomas Lovell. Fort family members were co-founders along with other families of the former National Life and Accident Insurance Company and its subsidiaries, WSM radio and the Grand Ole Opry country music program. Hooker also was close friends with Amon Evans, whose family then owned and published The Tennessean. Thereafter, Hooker convinced Evans to employ John Seigenthaler as the editor of the newspaper. Seigenthaler likewise had an association with Robert F. Kennedy that emanated from the Schoolfield investigation and trial. Thereafter, Seigenthaler was a major political supporter of Robert Kennedy and of Hooker.

With the support and backing of the Evans family and John Seigenthaler, Hooker decided to enter the 1966 Democratic primary for governor of Tennessee. His opponent was Buford Ellington, a former governor attempting a return to the office who had the strong backing of the incumbent governor, Clement, and President Lyndon Johnson, who was Ellington's close personal friend and who had appointed him to a prominent position at the Federal Emergency Management Agency. Ellington was also strongly backed by the other Nashville newspaper, the Nashville Banner. Supported by some of the more progressive members of the Nashville business community and using innovative advertising such as sponsoring NASCAR driver Buddy Baker's racecar, Hooker underwent a blistering counterattack which was mounted by Ellington's "Old Guard" supporters. Hooker ran fairly well in the urban and rural areas but lost badly in the suburbs, to which the Old Guard's support had largely moved in the post-World War II era. Ellington went on to an easy victory in November, with no Republican opposition, the last time such a circumstance was to occur in Tennessee.

During the next four years, Hooker divided his time between two major activities – investments and planning to run for governor again in 1970. By this time Hooker had many diversified investments including Whale Inc. and a chain of fried chicken restaurants with country comedian Minnie Pearl and gospel singer Mahalia Jackson. His rationale for the chicken restaurants was just as Pepsi had long made a large amount of money as the primary competitor to Coca-Cola, someone else stood to make a comparable fortune as the primary competitor to Kentucky Fried Chicken. Hooker was also closely involved around the same time with the Frist family and others in the formation of what became the first major for-profit healthcare chain, the Hospital Corporation of America.

Hooker won the 1970 Democratic nomination for governor of Tennessee over a host of competitors, most notably the candidate of the "Old Guard", Nashville attorney Stan Snodgrass, who had the endorsement of the Nashville Banner. In the past, the Democratic nomination would have assured him victory in November. But many things had changed in Tennessee in the four years since his loss to Ellington. For one, the Republican Party was benefitting greatly from the Southern strategy of then-President Richard Nixon to reach out to rural and working-class urban Southern whites who were disturbed by desegregation and other rapid social changes. Tennessee Republicans, only just over two years from failing to field a gubernatorial candidate, had even managed to organize the Tennessee House of Representatives for the first (and only) time in the 20th century in 1969, and they were not about to allow what appeared to them to be a golden opportunity to pass them by. In 1966, Howard Baker had beaten Governor Frank Clement for the United States Senate because the Democratic party was divided between the Clement/Ellington forces and the anti-Clement/Ellington forces, as best exemplified in the heated primary battle that year between Ellington and Hooker, and the absence of a gubernatorial nominee had in fact allowed Republicans to focus almost all of their energies on electing Baker to the Senate seat.

Events, as well as people, seemed to conspire against Hooker in the fall of 1970. The Republicans had staged a very hard-fought primary race of their own but had come out of it largely united behind the candidacy of Memphis dentist Dr. Winfield Dunn, former chairman of the Shelby County Republican Party. Many of Snodgrass' erstwhile supporters, including the Nashville Banner, endorsed Dunn. At the same time, the Securities and Exchange Commission had in 1969 announced an investigation into Minnie Pearl's Chicken, and over time as a consequence of the investigation the price the stock had declined from a high of $40 a share to approximately 50 cents a share.

Simultaneously, Democratic Senator Albert Gore, Sr. was running an equally hard-fought and ultimately unsuccessful campaign for a fourth term against Chattanooga Congressman Bill Brock. The friendly relationship both Gore and Hooker shared with the Kennedy family became an issue, especially in light of Ted Kennedy's involvement in the Chappaquiddick incident the previous year. Republicans and "Old Guard" detractors alike pilloried the two, leading to a Republican sweep and for the first time in the post-Reconstruction era the Republicans held the Tennessee governorship and both United States Senate seats (although, curiously, they lost control of the state House of Representatives and did not gain it again it until the beginning of the 21st century).

Hooker was never convicted of any criminal wrongdoing in the SEC/Minnie Pearl Chicken case. Nonetheless, the SEC investigation, which lasted three years, caused the company virtually to liquidate, although a few outlets continued to function into the 1980s. Hooker claimed until his death that the SEC investigation was unjustified and totally politically inspired by the Nixon Administration, which wanted to defeat Albert Gore Sr. and Hooker because they were anti-war candidates. Hooker also claimed that the Nixon political "machine" challenged Hooker and Gore as part of its "Southern strategy".

== Later life ==
Hooker served as chairman of STP Corporation from 1973 to 1976. In 1976 he entered the Democratic Primary for Brock's U.S. Senate seat and was at first perhaps favored to win the nomination but was by defeated Jim Sasser for the nomination.

In 1979, Hooker arranged for the sale of The Tennessean newspaper to Gannett, which had earlier purchased the Banner but preferred to own morning rather than evening papers. At the same time, his own investment group purchased the Banner from Gannett (the two papers were linked by a joint operating agreement) and Hooker became publisher of the very paper that had so tormented him only nine years earlier. In retrospect, he has called this perhaps the greatest single moment of his life. Hooker, however, sold his portion of the Banner in 1982 and, for a period of time, became chairman of United Press International, the historical but faltering competitor to the Associated Press in the wire service news business.

Hooker's fortunes seemed to ebb and flow in the 1980s. At one point, he became rather prosperous again. He promoted a new fast-food chain, Hooker's Hamburgers, named for himself, which sold hamburgers from small, drive-by-only buildings, operating this venture from 1984 to 1986 before selling it for $3 million. One of these outlets was built in the Nashville area and several more in the Dallas-Fort Worth Metroplex.

Hooker began to file to run for various political offices including governor, Senator, Congressman, and others, for the purpose of acquiring the legal standing to sue all of these persons running for the office for taking campaign contributions from "out of state" contributors, which according to his legal theories were both illegal and unconstitutional. Hooker continued to bring lawsuits in that regard down through the early part of the 21st century. In 1995 he sued President Bill Clinton, as well as all of the other presidential candidates, for accepting certain campaign contributions, which according to his theory were unconstitutional. He sued the Tennessee Supreme Court, saying their elections under the "Modified Missouri Plan" were unconstitutional, eventually forcing them to recuse themselves from their own case and require the empanelment of a special State Supreme Court to hear the charges (this panel dismissed Hooker's claims).

Hooker received the 1998 Democratic nomination for governor. No other prominent Democrat had filed to oppose incumbent Republican governor Don Sundquist, and Hooker defeated a field of other "token" candidates as well as the "serious" candidate with union backing, Mark Whitaker. Hooker won the nomination based on name recognition among older Democrats, who in Tennessee are generally the most reliable primary voters. He ran best in the rural areas and with urban blacks, who had always provided him with a core support group. While not formally disavowing him, the regular Democratic Party organization did almost nothing to promote his candidacy, and Hooker had disavowed the formal fundraising process as unethical and immoral. Hooker received about 30 percent of the vote in the November general election. At this time, Governor Sundquist had a 72 percent approval rating. Hooker remained a political activist, running for Congress in 2002 and again suing all his opponents, and then for Chancery Court judge in 2004 as an independent against Chancellor Claudia Bonnyman. He sued her for taking campaign contributions from lawyers who practiced in her court and then attended fundraisers held by her at which, according to Hooker, she furnished them with food and drink as prohibited by Article X Section 3 of the Tennessee Constitution.

In 2006 Hooker filed to run for the Democratic nomination for both governor of Tennessee and United States Senator. Despite refusing to raise or spend any money in these efforts, Hooker finished third in the senatorial primary and second in the gubernatorial primary held on August 3.

He ran for Governor as an independent in the 2014 election, and in 2015 worked to legalize physician-assisted suicide in Tennessee.

On January 24, 2016, John Jay Hooker died of cancer at the age of 85.

Party political offices
Preceded by Buford Ellington	Democratic nominee for Governor of Tennessee; 1970	Succeeded by Ray Blanton
Preceded by Phil Bredesen	Democratic nominee for Governor of Tennessee; 1998	Succeeded by Phil Bredesen
