= 1920 United States presidential election in Tennessee =

- November 2, 1920

All 12 Tennessee votes to the Electoral College
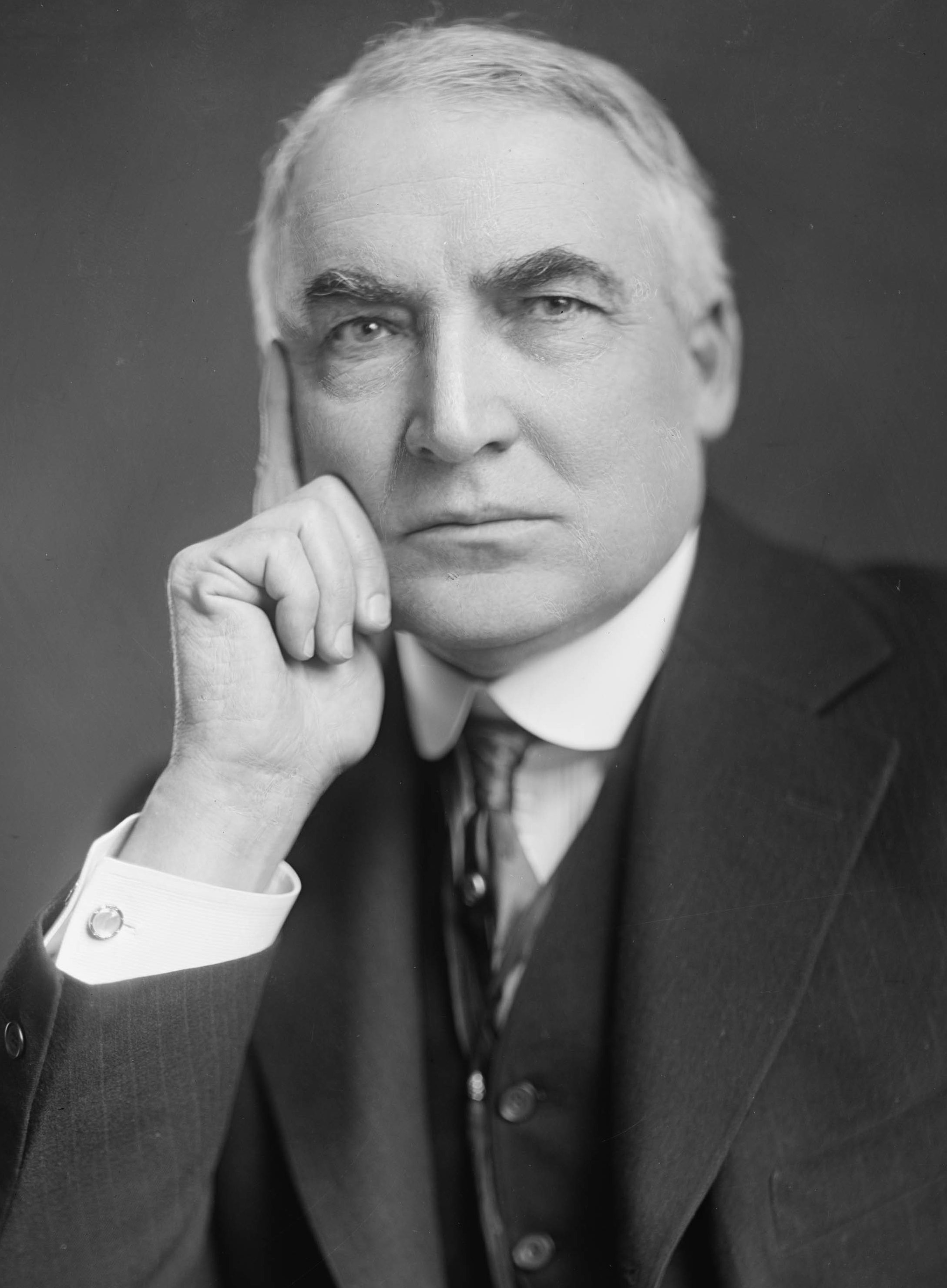

Nominee	Warren G. Harding	James M. Cox
Party	Republican	Democratic
Home state	Ohio	Ohio
Running mate	Calvin Coolidge	Franklin D. Roosevelt
Electoral vote	12	0
Popular vote	219,829	206,558
Percentage	51.29%	48.19%
County results
Harding
50–60%
60–70%
70–80%
80–90%
90–100%
Cox
40–50%
50–60%
60–70%
70–80%
80–90%
90–100%
President before election
Woodrow Wilson
Democratic
Elected President
Warren G. Harding
Republican

The 1920 United States presidential election in Tennessee took place on November 2, 1920, as part of the 1920 United States presidential election. Tennessee voters chose 12 representatives, or electors, to the Electoral College, who voted for president and vice president.

For over a century after the Civil War, Tennessee was divided according to political loyalties established in that war. Unionist regions covering almost all of East Tennessee, Kentucky Pennyroyal-allied Macon County, and the five West Tennessee Highland Rim counties of Carroll, Henderson, McNairy, Hardin and Wayne voted Republican – generally by landslide margins – as they saw the Democratic Party as the “war party” who had forced them into a war they did not wish to fight. On the other hand, the rest of Middle and West Tennessee, which had supported and driven the state's secession, was equally fiercely Democratic because it associated the Republicans with Reconstruction.

After the disenfranchisement of the state's African-American population by a poll tax was largely complete by the 1890s, the Democratic Party was certain of winning statewide elections if united, although, unlike the Deep South Republicans, the Republican Party would almost always gain thirty to forty percent of the statewide vote from mountain and Highland Rim support. The Republicans did win the governorship in 1910 and 1912, when the Democratic Party was bitterly divided, but did not gain at other levels of government.

During the period before the 1920 presidential election, Tennessee was the center of bitter debate over the ratification of the Nineteenth Amendment, which the state, with its Democratic Party still seriously divided, ultimately passed by a very close margin, 50 to 46, in the House of Representatives.

Although most Republicans in the state legislature had supported the Nineteenth Amendment, outgoing Democratic President Woodrow Wilson’s League of Nations was deeply unpopular in the isolationist and fundamentalist Appalachian regions, and the President was thus stigmatized for his advocacy of that organization. Democratic nominee James M. Cox also supported American participation in the League, whereas his rival Warren Harding was largely opposed to the League and was helped in the South by racial and labor unrest elsewhere in the country.

== Campaign ==
At the end of October, opinions were divided on whether Harding could break the “Solid South” in Tennessee. It had had the strongest Republican Party in the region since Reconstruction was overthrown, and some suggested he could make a challenge in North Carolina where the poll tax had just been abolished by a state constitutional amendment in 1919. (Note: Tennessee would not abolish its own poll tax until 1951, though it was proposed as early as 1943.) Claims continued to be divisive even after the polls in Tennessee had closed.

Ultimately, a late swing to Harding ensured the "Solid South" was broken for the first time since 1896, and Harding became only the second Republican to carry Tennessee after Ulysses S. Grant in 1868. Harding's victory did not see a major change in partisan alignments, but was due to gains in normally Democratic rural white counties of Middle Tennessee – where he was the only Republican to carry Perry County (Note: In 1968, Perry County voted for then-former and future Governor of Alabama George Wallace, who was the nominee of the American Party in Tennessee.) between Ulysses S. Grant in 1868 and John McCain in 2008 and the solitary GOP victor in Jackson County until Mitt Romney in 2012 – plus abnormally high voter turnout amongst isolationist mountaineers in rock-ribbed Republican East Tennessee. Harding also gained important help through overwhelming support from the few blacks able to vote – all residing within the state's largest cities – due to his public support for civil rights for African-Americans.

In the concurrent Tennessee gubernatorial election, the Republican Party also gained the governorship.

== Results ==
Presidential Candidate	Running Mate	Party	Electoral Vote (EV)	Popular Vote (PV)	
Warren G. Harding of Ohio	Calvin Coolidge	Republican	12	219,829	51.29%
James M. Cox	Franklin D. Roosevelt	Democratic	0	206,558	48.19%
Eugene Debs	Seymour Stedman	Socialist	0	2,239	0.52%

=== Results by county ===
1920 United States presidential election in Tennessee by county
County	Warren G. Harding Republican		James M. Cox Democratic		Eugene V. Debs Socialist		Margin		Total votes cast
County	#	%	#	%	#	%	#	%	Total votes cast
Anderson	3,127	80.30%	748	19.21%	19	0.49%	2,379	61.09%	3,894
Bedford	2,056	48.51%	2,182	51.49%	0	0.00%	-126	-2.97%	4,238
Benton	1,514	44.04%	1,914	55.67%	10	0.29%	-400	-11.63%	3,438
Bledsoe	1,198	71.31%	482	28.69%	0	0.00%	716	42.62%	1,680
Blount	5,540	78.09%	1,550	21.85%	4	0.06%	3,990	56.24%	7,094
Bradley	2,255	67.33%	1,058	31.59%	36	1.07%	1,197	35.74%	3,349
Campbell	3,368	83.82%	650	16.18%	0	0.00%	2,718	67.65%	4,018
Cannon	687	47.15%	770	52.85%	0	0.00%	-83	-5.70%	1,457
Carroll	4,141	56.29%	3,215	43.71%	0	0.00%	926	12.59%	7,356
Carter	6,059	89.99%	674	10.01%	0	0.00%	5,385	79.98%	6,733
Cheatham	569	31.77%	1,219	68.06%	3	0.17%	-650	-36.29%	1,791
Chester	1,088	48.81%	1,105	49.57%	36	1.62%	-17	-0.76%	2,229
Claiborne	2,612	67.88%	1,236	32.12%	0	0.00%	1,376	35.76%	3,848
Clay	1,044	57.14%	772	42.26%	11	0.60%	272	14.89%	1,827
Cocke	3,283	77.36%	929	21.89%	32	0.75%	2,354	55.47%	4,244
Coffee	822	28.69%	2,043	71.31%	0	0.00%	-1,221	-42.62%	2,865
Crockett	2,326	50.81%	2,252	49.19%	0	0.00%	74	1.62%	4,578
Cumberland	1,485	72.69%	557	27.26%	1	0.05%	928	45.42%	2,043
Davidson	6,811	33.48%	13,354	65.63%	181	0.89%	-6,543	-32.16%	20,346
Decatur	1,608	57.84%	1,149	41.33%	23	0.83%	459	16.51%	2,780
DeKalb	2,572	56.47%	1,983	43.53%	0	0.00%	589	12.93%	4,555
Dickson	1,412	39.70%	2,145	60.30%	0	0.00%	-733	-20.61%	3,557
Dyer	1,166	26.76%	3,181	73.01%	10	0.23%	-2,015	-46.25%	4,357
Fayette	346	13.11%	2,294	86.89%	0	0.00%	-1,948	-73.79%	2,640
Fentress	1,808	71.66%	694	27.51%	21	0.83%	1,114	44.15%	2,523
Franklin	1,558	30.77%	3,504	69.19%	2	0.04%	-1,946	-38.43%	5,064
Gibson	3,209	34.99%	5,942	64.80%	19	0.21%	-2,733	-29.80%	9,170
Giles	2,224	41.50%	3,129	58.39%	6	0.11%	-905	-16.89%	5,359
Grainger	2,158	70.66%	895	29.31%	1	0.03%	1,263	41.36%	3,054
Greene	5,677	65.97%	2,924	33.98%	5	0.06%	2,753	31.99%	8,606
Grundy	447	32.99%	745	54.98%	163	12.03%	-298	-21.99%	1,355
Hamblen	1,571	53.86%	1,301	44.60%	45	1.54%	270	9.26%	2,917
Hamilton	10,793	51.30%	9,910	47.11%	334	1.59%	883	4.20%	21,037
Hancock	1,740	81.92%	384	18.08%	0	0.00%	1,356	63.84%	2,124
Hardeman	895	28.59%	2,212	70.67%	23	0.73%	-1,317	-42.08%	3,130
Hardin	3,077	68.58%	1,398	31.16%	12	0.27%	1,679	37.42%	4,487
Hawkins	2,650	65.11%	1,381	33.93%	39	0.96%	1,269	31.18%	4,070
Haywood	101	4.64%	2,068	95.04%	7	0.32%	-1,967	-90.40%	2,176
Henderson	3,112	71.61%	1,217	28.00%	17	0.39%	1,895	43.60%	4,346
Henry	1,957	29.50%	4,613	69.55%	63	0.95%	-2,656	-40.04%	6,633
Hickman	1,470	51.63%	1,362	47.84%	15	0.53%	108	3.79%	2,847
Houston	385	32.27%	790	66.22%	18	1.51%	-405	-33.95%	1,193
Humphreys	674	30.21%	1,534	68.76%	23	1.03%	-860	-38.55%	2,231
Jackson	1,187	51.97%	1,097	48.03%	0	0.00%	90	3.94%	2,284
Jefferson	3,583	81.58%	741	16.87%	68	1.55%	2,842	64.71%	4,392
Johnson	3,627	92.57%	291	7.43%	0	0.00%	3,336	85.15%	3,918
Knox	12,005	63.41%	6,801	35.93%	125	0.66%	5,204	27.49%	18,931
Lake	352	22.68%	1,192	76.80%	8	0.52%	-840	-54.12%	1,552
Lauderdale	1,190	33.97%	2,313	66.03%	0	0.00%	-1,123	-32.06%	3,503
Lawrence	3,843	59.55%	2,610	40.45%	0	0.00%	1,233	19.11%	6,453
Lewis	446	52.29%	403	47.25%	4	0.47%	43	5.04%	853
Lincoln	1,091	30.65%	2,463	69.19%	6	0.17%	-1,372	-38.54%	3,560
Loudon	1,872	72.70%	686	26.64%	17	0.66%	1,186	46.06%	2,575
Macon	3,208	75.02%	1,066	24.93%	2	0.05%	2,142	50.09%	4,276
Madison	2,665	33.54%	5,280	66.46%	0	0.00%	-2,615	-32.91%	7,945
Marion	2,662	58.12%	1,874	40.92%	44	0.96%	788	17.21%	4,580
Marshall	753	29.01%	1,828	70.42%	15	0.58%	-1,075	-41.41%	2,596
Maury	1,379	33.53%	2,693	65.48%	41	1.00%	-1,314	-31.95%	4,113
McMinn	2,800	62.63%	1,636	36.59%	35	0.78%	1,164	26.03%	4,471
McNairy	3,212	63.29%	1,863	36.71%	0	0.00%	1,349	26.58%	5,075
Meigs	915	56.24%	712	43.76%	0	0.00%	203	12.48%	1,627
Monroe	2,575	58.26%	1,845	41.74%	0	0.00%	730	16.52%	4,420
Montgomery	1,780	40.60%	2,564	58.49%	40	0.91%	-784	-17.88%	4,384
Moore	90	15.33%	497	84.67%	0	0.00%	-407	-69.34%	587
Morgan	2,248	73.18%	816	26.56%	8	0.26%	1,432	46.61%	3,072
Obion	1,307	22.25%	4,547	77.41%	20	0.34%	-3,240	-55.16%	5,874
Overton	1,939	51.91%	1,779	47.63%	17	0.46%	160	4.28%	3,735
Perry	747	51.91%	692	48.09%	0	0.00%	55	3.82%	1,439
Pickett	896	59.61%	607	40.39%	0	0.00%	289	19.23%	1,503
Polk	1,018	56.21%	775	42.79%	18	0.99%	243	13.42%	1,811
Putnam	2,132	41.58%	2,996	58.42%	0	0.00%	-864	-16.85%	5,128
Rhea	1,341	55.57%	1,051	43.56%	21	0.87%	290	12.02%	2,413
Roane	1,974	70.20%	838	29.80%	0	0.00%	1,136	40.40%	2,812
Robertson	1,191	28.04%	3,046	71.70%	11	0.26%	-1,855	-43.67%	4,248
Rutherford	1,881	35.58%	3,406	64.42%	0	0.00%	-1,525	-28.84%	5,287
Scott	2,537	90.54%	221	7.89%	44	1.57%	2,316	82.66%	2,802
Sequatchie	509	48.16%	545	51.56%	3	0.28%	-36	-3.41%	1,057
Sevier	6,006	93.60%	404	6.30%	7	0.11%	5,602	87.30%	6,417
Shelby	8,597	34.61%	15,986	64.35%	260	1.05%	-7,389	-29.74%	24,843
Smith	1,981	38.61%	3,150	61.39%	0	0.00%	-1,169	-22.78%	5,131
Stewart	849	26.17%	2,366	72.93%	29	0.89%	-1,517	-46.76%	3,244
Sullivan	3,593	45.37%	4,327	54.63%	0	0.00%	-734	-9.27%	7,920
Sumner	1,268	25.55%	3,674	74.03%	21	0.42%	-2,406	-48.48%	4,963
Tipton	906	23.99%	2,816	74.58%	54	1.43%	-1,910	-50.58%	3,776
Trousdale	574	37.52%	955	62.42%	1	0.07%	-381	-24.90%	1,530
Unicoi	2,584	82.42%	547	17.45%	4	0.13%	2,037	64.98%	3,135
Union	2,607	85.98%	423	13.95%	2	0.07%	2,184	72.03%	3,032
Van Buren	223	38.32%	351	60.31%	8	1.37%	-128	-21.99%	582
Warren	1,010	33.53%	1,986	65.94%	16	0.53%	-976	-32.40%	3,012
Washington	4,858	68.21%	2,260	31.73%	4	0.06%	2,598	36.48%	7,122
Wayne	2,617	79.69%	654	19.91%	13	0.40%	1,963	59.77%	3,284
Weakley	2,741	38.25%	4,395	61.33%	30	0.42%	-1,654	-23.08%	7,166
White	1,456	39.81%	2,201	60.19%	0	0.00%	-745	-20.37%	3,657
Williamson	946	32.07%	2,004	67.93%	0	0.00%	-1,058	-35.86%	2,950
Wilson	1,532	41.45%	2,160	58.44%	4	0.11%	-628	-16.99%	3,696
Totals	219,829 (Note: These totals for all three candidates as officially listed are not the sum of the county totals.)	51.29%	206,558	48.19%	2,239	0.52%	13,271	3.10%	428,626

== See also ==
- 1920 Tennessee gubernatorial election
