= Chris Anderson (politician) =

American politician

Member of the Chattanooga City Council District 7
- In office April 15, 2013 – April 11, 2017
- Preceded by: Manny Rico
- Succeeded by: Erskine Oglesby, Jr.

Personal details
- Party: Democratic Party

Chris Anderson is an American politician and Democratic Party political activist. He was a member of the Chattanooga, Tennessee City Council for District 7, but was defeated in a run-off election on April 11, 2017. He was the first openly LGBT individual to be elected to Chattanooga's City Council. He also serves as a member of the Tennessee Democratic Party State Executive Committee.

== Political career ==
Anderson started his political career as a Democratic Party activist. He was elected in 2003 as the President of the Tennessee Young Democrats which also gave him a seat on the Tennessee Democratic Party State Executive Committee. He was later elected in 2007 as the Executive Vice President of the Young Democrats of America nationally when that organization would be led for the first time by an openly gay President and Executive Vice President. He was elected to the Chattanooga City Council in 2013.

== Domestic Partnership Benefits Ordinance ==
Anderson proposed an equal domestic partnership benefits ordinance which the city council passed on November 12, 2013, in a 5–4 vote in favor of allowing domestic partnership benefits for same-sex couples in the city of Chattanooga. On November 19, 2013, the city council in a final vote, voted 5–3 in favor of allowing domestic partnership benefits. Before the domestic partnership ordinance went into effect, the Citizens for Government Accountability and Transparency, a local segment of the Tea Party, gathered enough signatures to put repeal of the ordinance to a popular vote in August 2014. The city council did not repeal the ordinance on its own, allowing the vote to proceed on August 7, the general election date for Hamilton County.

On August 7, 2014, the voters of Chattanooga repealed Ordinance 12781 by a vote of 62.58% in favor and 37.42% against.

== 2014 recall effort ==
Anderson was the subject of a controversial 2014 recall effort which failed. Anderson filed a lawsuit to stop the recall accusing his opponents of bigotry because he felt the recall effort was part of a political backlash to his Domestic Partnership Ordinance.
