= 1998 United States House of Representatives elections in Tennessee =

- November 3, 1998

All 9 Tennessee seats to the United States House of Representatives
- Turnout: 32.53% ▼30.24 pp
	Majority party	Minority party
Party	Republican	Democratic
Last election	5	4
Seats won	5	4
Seat change	Steady	Steady
Popular vote	469,551	412,378
Percentage	51.40%	45.14%
Swing	▲1.60%	▼2.89%

Republican hold
Democratic hold
Republican
50–60%
60–70%
70–80%
80–90%
90–100%
Democratic
50–60%
60–70%
70–80%
80–90%
90–100%

The 1998 congressional elections in Tennessee was held on November 3, 1998, to determine who will represent the state of Tennessee in the United States House of Representatives.

Following the 1998 elections, no seats changed hands, leaving the Tennessee delegation at a 5-4 Republican majority.

== Overview ==
United States House of Representatives elections in Tennessee, 1998
Party	Votes	Percentage	Seats	+/–
Republican	469,551	51.40%	5	—
Democratic	412,378	45.14%	4	—
Independents	30,856	3.38%	0	—
Write-ins	796	0.09%	0	—
Totals	913,581	100.00%	9	—

Popular vote
Republican	51.40%
Democratic	45.14%
Other	3.47%

House seats
Republican	55.56%
Democratic	44.44%

=== By district ===
District		Incumbent				Candidates
Location	1997 PVI	Member	Party	First elected	Status	Candidates
Tennessee 1	R+14	Bill Jenkins	Republican	1996	Incumbent re-elected.	▌ ✓ Bill Jenkins (Republican) 69%; ▌Kay White (Democratic) 31%
Tennessee 2	R+9	Jimmy Duncan	Republican	1988	Incumbent re-elected.	▌ ✓ Jimmy Duncan (Republican) 88.6%
Tennessee 3	R+5	Zach Wamp	Republican	1994	Incumbent re-elected.	▌ ✓ Zach Wamp (Republican) 67%; ▌Lewis Lewis (Democratic) 33%
Tennessee 4	R+3	Van Hilleary	Republican	1994	Incumbent re-elected.	▌ ✓ Van Hilleary (Republican) 60%; ▌Jerry D. Cooper (Democratic) 40%
Tennessee 5	D+4	Bob Clement	Democratic	1988	Incumbent re-elected.	▌ ✓ Bob Clement (Democratic) 83%
Tennessee 6	R+4	Bart Gordon	Democratic	1984	Incumbent re-elected.	▌ ✓ Bart Gordon (Democratic) 55%; ▌Walt Massey (Republican) 45%
Tennessee 7	R+11	Ed Bryant	Republican	1994	Incumbent re-elected.	▌ ✓ Ed Bryant (Republican); Uncontested
Tennessee 8	R+1	John Tanner	Democratic	1988	Incumbent re-elected.	▌ ✓ John Tanner (Democratic); Uncontested
Tennessee 9	D+17	Harold Ford Jr.	Democratic	1996	Incumbent re-elected.	▌ ✓ Harold Ford Jr. (Democratic) 79%; ▌Claude Burdikoff (Republican) 19%

== District 1 ==
Tennessee's 1st congressional district election, 1998
Party	Candidate	Votes	%
Republican	Bill Jenkins (inc.)	68,904	69.12%
Democratic	Kay C. White	30,710	30.81%
Write-In	Write-ins	75	0.08%
Total votes		99,689	100.00%
Republican hold			

== District 2 ==
Tennessee's 2nd congressional district election, 1998
Party	Candidate	Votes	%
Republican	Jimmy Duncan (inc.)	90,860	88.64%
Independent	Robert O. Watson	4,372	4.27%
Independent	Greg Samples	4,332	4.23%
Independent	George Njezic	2,920	2.85%
Write-In	Write-ins	18	0.02%
Total votes		102,502	100.00%
Republican hold			

== District 3 ==
Tennessee's 3rd congressional district election, 1998
Party	Candidate	Votes	%
Republican	Zach Wamp (inc.)	75,100	66.00%
Democratic	James M. Lewis, Jr.	37,144	32.64%
Independent	Richard M. Sims	1,468	1.29%
Write-In	Write-ins	74	0.07%
Total votes		113,786	100.00%
Republican hold			

== District 4 ==
Tennessee's 4th congressional district election, 1998
Party	Candidate	Votes	%
Republican	Van Hilleary (inc.)	62,829	59.57%
Democratic	Jerry W. Cooper	42,627	40.41%
Write-In	Write-ins	23	0.02%
Total votes		105,479	100.00%
Republican hold			

== District 5 ==
Tennessee's 5th congressional district election, 1998
Party	Candidate	Votes	%
Democratic	Bob Clement (inc.)	74,611	82.81%
Independent	William M. Lancaster	6,162	6.84%
Independent	Al Borgman	4,983	5.53%
Independent	Gary I. Worden	4,345	4.82%
Write-In	Write-ins	1	0.00%
Total votes		90,102	100.00%
Democratic hold			

== District 6 ==
Tennessee's 6th congressional district election, 1998
Party	Candidate	Votes	%
Democratic	Bart Gordon (inc.)	75,055	54.61%
Republican	Walt Massey	62,277	45.31%
Write-In	Write-ins	104	0.08%
Total votes		137,436	100.00%
Democratic hold			

== District 7 ==
Tennessee's 7th congressional district election, 1998
Party	Candidate	Votes	%
Republican	Ed Bryant (inc.)	91,503	99.48%
Write-In	Write-ins	477	0.52%
Total votes		91,980	100.00%
Republican hold			

== District 8 ==
Tennessee's 8th congressional district election, 1998
Party	Candidate	Votes	%
Democratic	John Tanner (inc.)	76,803	99.97%
Write-In	Write-ins	22	0.03%
Total votes		76,825	100.00%
Democratic hold			

== District 9 ==
Tennessee's 9th congressional district election, 1998
Party	Candidate	Votes	%
Democratic	Harold Ford Jr. (inc.)	75,428	78.75%
Republican	Claude Burdikoff	18,078	18.87%
Independent	Gwendolyn L. Moore	932	0.97%
Independent	Johnny Kelly	775	0.81%
Independent	Greg Voehringer	567	0.59%
Write-In	Write-ins	2	0.00%
Total votes		95,782	100.00%
Democratic hold			

== See also ==
- 1998 Tennessee gubernatorial election
- 1998 United States elections
