= Indya Kincannon =

American politician

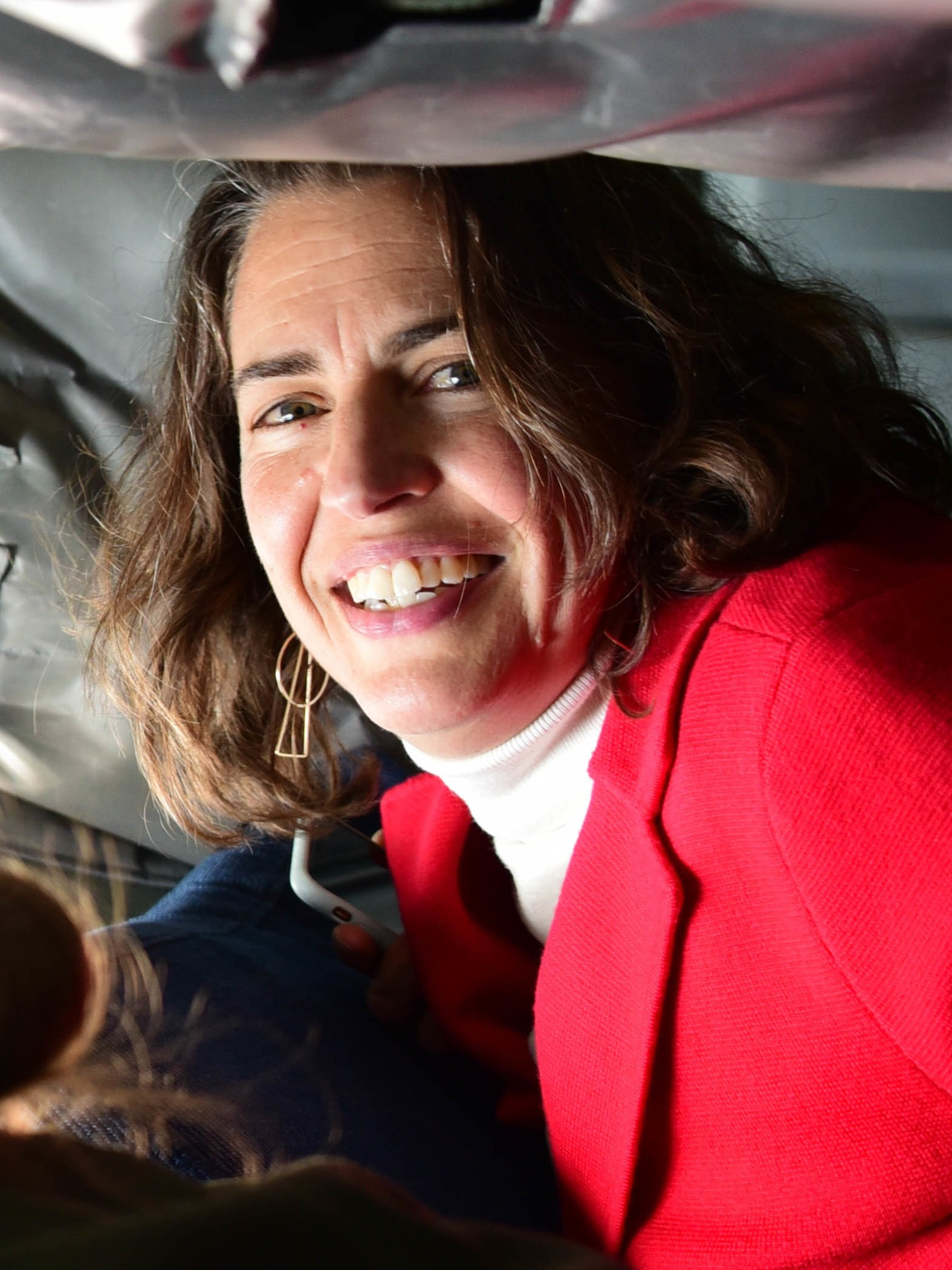
- Kincannon in KC-135r Stratotanker (2019)

69th Mayor of Knoxville
- Incumbent
- Assumed office December 21, 2019
- Preceded by: Madeline Rogero

Member of the Knox County Board of Education from the 2nd district
- In office 2004–2014

Personal details
- Born: March 30, 1971 (age 55)
- Party: Democratic
- Spouse: Ben Barton (m. 1995)
- Children: 2
- Education: Haverford College (BA); Princeton University (MPA)

Indya Kincannon (born March 30, 1971) is an American politician serving since 2019 as the 69th mayor of Knoxville, Tennessee. She won the 2019 mayoral election with more than 52% of the runoff vote over Eddie Mannis. She is Knoxville's second female mayor, after her predecessor, Madeline Rogero. Though elected in a nonpartisan municipal election, Kincannon is affiliated with the Democratic Party.

== Education and early career ==
Kincannon earned a Bachelor of Arts degree in history from Haverford College. As an undergraduate, she studied Spanish colonial history in the spring of 1992 at the University of Barcelona. She then earned a master's degree in public affairs and urban and regional planning from the Woodrow Wilson School of Public and International Affairs at Princeton University. She took teaching certification courses at the University of Tennessee.

In 2004, Kincannon was elected to the Knox County Board of Education, representing District 2. She was elected chairperson for three consecutive years from 2008 until 2011, and served on the board until 2014.

== Mayor of Knoxville ==
=== Elections ===
In the August 27, 2019, primary election for mayor of Knoxville, Kincannon advanced with 29.13% of the vote. Business owner Eddie Mannis received 36.64% of the vote and also advanced to the November regular election. Councilman Marshall Stair finished third with 26.98% of the vote.

On November 5, 2019, Kincannon was elected mayor with 52.41% of votes cast.

On November 16, 2022, Kincannon announced her candidacy for reelection in the 2023 Knoxville mayoral race. On August 29, 2023, Kincannon was reelected in the first round with 57.52% of the vote.

=== Tenure ===
In April 2022, Kincannon announced the hire of new Knoxville police chief Paul Noel. Kincannon's secretive hiring process of the new police chief, employing an outside private search firm to avoid state open records laws, drew criticism, including from former longtime Knoxville mayor Victor Ashe. Kincannon's office argued that the process was done to protect candidates and their careers. The Knoxville News Sentinel sued the city in July 2022 to reveal the hidden process, including applicants' names, demographics, and résumés, as well as schedules and documents from Police Chief Advisory Committee meetings. In December 2022, a judge ruled that the city of Knoxville could not block Knox News from asking officials questions under oath about how they conducted their search for a police chief.
