= Benjamin H. Barton =

American legal scholar

Benjamin H. Barton is an American legal scholar and the Helen and Charles Lockett Distinguished Professor of Law at the University of Tennessee.

== Education ==
Barton graduated with honors from Haverford College in 1991 and received his J.D. from the University of Michigan Law School in 1996.

He won the 2010 LSAC Philip D. Shelton Award for outstanding research in legal education. In 2014-15 he received a Fulbright Award to teach comparative law at the University of Ljubljana in Slovenia. His research has been featured in USA Today, TIME Magazine, and the ABA Journal.

== Personal life ==
Barton is married to American politician and Mayor of Knoxville Indya Kincannon.
