= 1970 Tennessee gubernatorial election =

- November 3, 1970

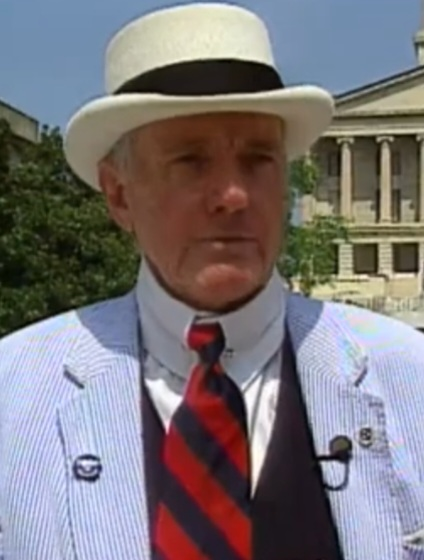
Nominee	Winfield Dunn	John Jay Hooker
Party	Republican	Democratic
Popular vote	575,777	509,521
Percentage	51.95%	45.98%
- Winfield: 40–50% 50–60% 60–70% 70–80% Hooker: 40–50% 50–60% 60–70% 70–80%
Governor before election
Buford Ellington
Democratic
Elected Governor
Winfield Dunn
Republican

The 1970 Tennessee gubernatorial election was held on November 3, 1970, to elect the next governor of Tennessee. Incumbent Democratic governor Buford Ellington was term-limited and was prohibited by the Constitution of Tennessee from seeking another term. Republican nominee Winfield Dunn, defeated Democratic opponent John Jay Hooker with 52.0% of the vote.

Winfield Dunn became the first Republican to win a Tennessee gubernatorial election in fifty years, marking a significant political shift in the state. While Democrats gained 13 Republican-held governorships in the 1970 elections, Republicans made only two gains, only winning in Tennessee and Connecticut.

== Background ==
By 1970, Tennessee was in the midst of political change. The state had not elected a Republican governor since Alfred A. Taylor in 1920, and Democratic dominance in statewide offices had been the rule for half a century.

The Democrats nominated John Jay Hooker, a Nashville lawyer, businessman, and flamboyant political figure who had previously run for governor. Hooker was charismatic and well-known, but also polarizing. His credibility was weakened by a financial scandal surrounding Minnie Pearl’s Fried Chicken, the fast-food chain he co-founded with his brother. Despite their ambitious expansion plans, the company faced operational challenges and drew scrutiny from the Securities and Exchange Commission over franchise fees and stock valuations. The controversy attracted negative media attention, with outlets like the Nashville Scene noting that the scandal cast doubts on Hooker’s suitability for office and may have undermined his appeal to moderate voters. Prior to his gubernatorial campaigns, Hooker had been active in Tennessee politics, working for governor Frank G. Clement and participating in national campaigns such as those of John F. Kennedy and Robert F. Kennedy, and he had also run for governor in 1966

On the Republican side, Winfield Dunn emerged from a crowded primary as the nominee. A Memphis dentist and businessman, Dunn had never held elected office before. Still, he was active in Republican circles: he had chaired the Shelby County Republican Party, worked on Barry Goldwater's campaign, and backed Richard Nixon in 1968. Federal judge Harry W. Wellford and future governor Lamar Alexander steered his campaign.

=== The campaign ===
The general election quickly turned into a hard-fought and closely watched contest. Hooker campaigned energetically and spent heavily on advertising, attacking Dunn as inexperienced. Dunn countered by emphasizing his integrity and by tying his campaign to the national Republican momentum. Newspapers across the state noted the intensity of the race, with debates between Dunn and Hooker drawing wide audiences. President Nixon’s administration quietly lent encouragement, and the GOP was already investing in Tennessee through the simultaneous U.S. Senate race, where Republican Bill Brock successfully unseated longtime Democratic Senator Albert Gore Sr.

== Primary elections ==
Primary elections were held on August 6, 1970.

=== Democratic primary ===
24.5% of the voting age population participated in the Democratic primary.

==== Candidates ====
- John Jay Hooker, perennial candidate
- Stan Snodgrass
- Robert L. Taylor
- Mary Anderson
- Ralph W. Emerson
- James A. Newton

==== Results ====
Democratic primary results
Party	Candidate	Votes	%
Democratic	John Jay Hooker	261,580	44.33
Democratic	Stan Snodgrass	193,199	32.74
Democratic	Robert L. Taylor	90,009	15.25
Democratic	Mary Anderson	29,175	4.94
Democratic	Ralph W. Emerson	12,608	2.14
Democratic	James A. Newton	3,490	0.59
Total votes		590,061	100.00

=== Republican primary ===
10.1% of the voting age population participated in the Republican primary.

==== Candidates ====
- Winfield Dunn, former chairman of the Shelby County Republican Party
- Maxey Jarman
- Bill Jenkins, former Speaker of the Tennessee House of Representatives
- Claude Robertson
- Hubert David Patty, perennial candidate

==== Results ====
Results by county: Dunn: 30–40%; 40–50%; 50–60% 60–70% 70–80% 80–90% >90%; Jarman: 30–40%; 40–50%; 50–60% 60–70% 70–80% 80–90%; Jenkins: 30–40%; 40–50% 50–60% 60–70% >90%; Robertson: 30–40%; 40–50% 50–60%; No data

Republican primary results
Party	Candidate	Votes	%
Republican	Winfield Dunn	81,475	33.26
Republican	Maxey Jarman	70,420	28.74
Republican	Bill Jenkins	50,910	20.78
Republican	Claude Robertson	40,547	16.55
Republican	Hubert David Patty	1,647	0.67
Total votes		244,999	100.00

== General election ==
=== Candidates ===
Major party candidates

- Winfield Dunn, Republican
- John Jay Hooker, Democratic

Other candidates

- Douglas L. Heinsohn, American

=== Results ===
1970 Tennessee gubernatorial election
Party	Candidate	Votes	%	±%
Republican	Winfield Dunn	575,777	51.95%	+51.95%
Democratic	John Jay Hooker	509,521	45.98%	−35.20%
American	Douglas L. Heinsohn	22,945	2.07%	+2.07%
Majority		66,256	5.97%	
Turnout		1,108,247		
Republican gain from Democratic		Swing		

== See also ==
- 1970 United States gubernatorial elections
- 1970 United States Senate election in Tennessee

== Works cited ==
- Steed, Robert; Moreland, Laurence; Baker, Tod, eds. (1980). Party Politics in the South. Praeger Publishers. ISBN 0030565863.
