= Republican Party of Shelby County =

- Chairman: Rachel Wall
- Founded: 1916
- Ideology: Conservatism; Fiscal conservatism Social conservatism
- National affiliation: Republican Party
- Colors: Red (unofficial)

Website
- shelbygop.org

The Republican Party of Shelby County is the Republican political organization for Shelby County, Tennessee. It has a long history of impacting politics in Shelby County long before the Republican Party was popular in the south.

Despite being in a heavily Democratic county, the Republican Party of Shelby County is the largest county Republican Party in the state. Though Tennessee does not register by party, it is estimated that there are roughly 272,000 Republican voters in Shelby County.

== History ==
The party has its origins in the Lincoln League, which was founded by Robert Church Jr. in 1916 to promote black voter registration. Church was one of the most prominent African-American businessmen in the nation and is credited with the early development of Beale Street. By the 1950s conservative Democrats were joining the party as blacks were leaving.

In the 1970s the party remade itself as a suburb-focused party that relied on activities like backyard parties, door-to-door campaigning and telephone networks to coordinate conservative voters in the suburbs.

Starting in 1992, the party began holding a primary election to pick candidates in the general election. It was scheduled for the same day as Tennessee's presidential primary, and represented the first partisan local elections in the County since before 1900. The county Democratic party soon copied the practice. The move meant the end of nearly a century of nonpartisan elections in the county.

== Chairpersons ==
Robert Church Jr.	(1910s)	Son of Robert Church, Sr. who was one of the first black millionaires in the south. Robert Church, Jr. was a Republican leader, businessman, and civil rights advocate in Memphis. He founded the Lincoln League in 1916, which helped establish the local Republican Party by mobilizing Black voters. A delegate to eight Republican National Conventions (1912–1940), he was a major force in Black political engagement. However, opposition from Democratic boss E.H. Crump led to his exile from Memphis in 1940, forcing him to relocate to Washington, D.C.
Lt. George W. Lee	(1920s–1940s)	Lt. Lee as an African-American soldier, author, and Republican political leader in Memphis, Tennessee. After serving as a lieutenant in World War I, he became a prominent businessman and was active in the Republican Party, serving as national director of "Veterans for Hoover" in the 1928 presidential election.
Walker Wellford, Jr.	(1954)	Was elected as a compromise candidate to unify different factions within the party. Was co-chairman with Dr. R.Q. Venson.
Dr. R.Q. Venson	(1954–1970)	Was a prominent African-American dentist and community leader in Memphis, Tennessee. After graduating from Meharry Medical College in 1912, he established a dental practice in Memphis. In 1935, recognizing the exclusion of Black citizens from the city's Cotton Carnival, Dr. Venson co-founded the Cotton Makers' Jubilee, providing an inclusive celebration of African-American culture and contributions to the cotton industry. Politically active, he served as an alternate delegate to the 1956 Republican National Convention and was co-chairman of the Republican Party of Shelby County.
Bob James	(1961–1963)	Memphis City Councilman
Governor Winfield Dunn	(1963–1967)	Governor of Tennessee (1971–1975)
Judge Harry W. Wellford	(1967–1969)	Judge (U.S. District Court, Western District of Tennessee 1970–1982), (U.S. Court of Appeals for the Sixth Circuit 1982–2021)
Alex Dann	(1969–1971)	Dann was a licensed attorney who practiced law in Tennessee. During his tenure, the party achieved significant victories, including the election of Winfield Dunn as Governor and Bill Brock's transition from the U.S. House of Representatives to the Senate.
Dr. Kyle Creson	(1971–1973)	Was a physician in Memphis, Tennessee, and a dedicated Republican leader. He served as Chairman of the Republican Party of Shelby County from 1971-1973, helping shape local conservative politics in that era. Passed away on his 88th birthday, February 25, 2019.
Bill Lawson	(1973–1975)	Served as Chairman of the Shelby County GOP (1973–1975) and navigated the local party through the Nixon and Agnew resignations. William V. Lawson Jr. also represented Memphis's District 9 in the Tennessee General Assembly.
Governor Don Sundquist	(1975–1977)	Congressman (7th district 1983–1995), Governor of Tennessee (1995–2003)
William H. Watkins, Jr.	(1977–1979)	William H. "Bill" Watkins Jr. is a certified public accountant based in Memphis, Tennessee. In 1971, he co-founded the accounting firm Watkins and Watkins, which later became Watkins Uiberall, PLLC. Bill Watkins passed away on October 20, 2026, at the age of 84.
Tom Pyron	(1979–1981)	Was a pediatric dentist in Memphis, Tennessee. He was known for his contributions to children's dental health and was active in Republican politics serving as chairman from 1979-1981. He passed in 1991 at the age of 64.
Maida Pearson Smith	(1981–1985)	Republican National Committeewoman (1984–1992) and first female Chair of the Republican Party of Shelby County.
Jack J. Craddock	(1985–1987)	Was an insurance executive and political activist in Memphis, Tennessee. Born in Humboldt, TN, he became president of Boyle Insurance Agency in 1972 and served until his retirement in 1998. Passed away in 2014 at the age of 82.
John L. Ryder	(1987–1991)	Republican National Committeeman (1996–2004; 2008–2016), Chairman of the Tennessee Valley Authority (2019–2021). John Ryder passed away on May 15, 2022, at the age of 72.
Dr. Phil Langsdon	(1991–1995)	Author of Tennessee, A Political History and is a board-certified facial plastic surgeon based in Germantown, Tennessee, a suburb of Memphis. He specializes exclusively in facial plastic and reconstructive surgery and has been practicing in the Memphis area since 1986.
David Kustoff	(1995–1999)	Congressman (8th district 2017–present)
Alan Crone	(1999–2003)	A fifth-generation Memphian and the founder and CEO of The Crone Law Firm, PLC, which specializes in employment and business law.
R. Kemp Conrad	(2003–2005)	Memphis City Councilman (2008–2020), Chairman of the Memphis City Council in 2016 and 2019, Vice Chairman of Memphis City Council in 2015.
Bill Giannini	(2005–2009)	Shelby County Election Commission Chairman (2009)
Lang Wiseman	(2009–2011)	Deputy to the Governor and Chief Counsel for Governor Bill Lee (2018–2022)
Justin Joy	(2011–2015)	Justin Joy is a shareholder in the Memphis office of Lewis Thomason, where he leads the firm's cybersecurity practice group and serves as the privacy officer.
Mary Wagner	(2015–2016)	Appointed Circuit Court Judge (2016) by Governor Bill Haslam. In 2024, she was nominated by Governor Bill Lee to serve on the Tennessee Supreme Court. She was confirmed and is currently serving as the newest Tennessee Supreme Court Justice.
Lee Mills	(2016–2019)	Served as 1st Vice Chairman under Mary Wagner. Elevated to Chairman after Judge Wagner was appointed to her judgeship. Ran successfully for a full two-year term in 2017. Under his tenure, the party grew to the largest membership size in decades. He is the current TNGOP District 32 Committeeman. He is married to former Shelby County Commissioner Amber Mills.
Chris Tutor	(2019–2021)	Chris Tutor has been Chief of Staff to Tennessee Attorney General Jonathan Skrmetti since March 2025, leading the office's legislative and communications teams and its work with other state AGs and federal partners. Before that he was a partner at Butler Snow in Memphis, where he focused on commercial real estate and business deals.
Cary Vaughn	(2021–2025)	Run unopposed in 2021 and 2023. Currently serves as President of Love Worth Finding Ministries and Pastor at Community Baptist Church in Rosemark, TN.
Worth Morgan	(2025–2026)	Former Memphis City Councilman and Republican Candidate for Shelby County Mayor. Led the party for one year until stepping down for family health issues.
Rachel Wall	(2026-Present)	1st Vice Chair Rachel Wall was elected as the chair after Chairman Morgan resigned. Her term will run until early 2027.
