= Winfield Dunn =

American politician (1927–2024)

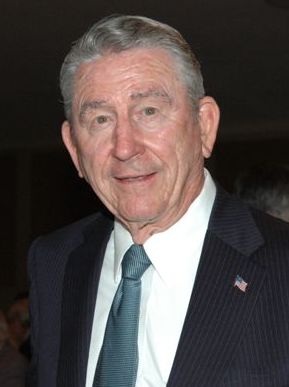
- Dunn in 2007

43rd Governor of Tennessee
- In office January 16, 1971 – January 18, 1975
- Lieutenant: John Wilder
- Preceded by: Buford Ellington
- Succeeded by: Ray Blanton

Personal details
- Born: Bryant Winfield Culberson Dunn; July 1, 1927 Meridian, Mississippi, U.S.
- Died: September 28, 2024 (aged 97) Nashville, Tennessee, U.S.
- Party: Republican
- Spouse: Betty Prichard (m. 1950)
- Children: 3
- Parent: Aubert C. Dunn (father)
- Education: University of Mississippi (BBA); University of Tennessee, Memphis (DDS)
- Occupation: Dentist

Military service
- Allegiance: United States
- Branch/service: United States Navy
- Years of service: 1944–1946
- Battles/wars: World War II

Bryant Winfield Culberson Dunn (July 1, 1927 – September 28, 2024) was an American businessman and politician who served as the 43rd governor of Tennessee from 1971 to 1975. He was the state's first Republican governor in fifty years. Dunn was an unsuccessful candidate for a second term in 1986, losing to Democrat Ned McWherter. He remained active in the Republican Party and the medical field from the end of his term as governor until his death.

== Early life ==
Dunn was born in Meridian, Mississippi, the son of Aubert C. Dunn, an attorney and politician, and Dorothy (Crum) Dunn. Aubert served one term in the U.S. House of Representatives, 1935–1937. In 1944, during World War II, he enlisted in the U.S. Navy, and served as a pharmacists' mate in the Asia-Pacific Theatre for eighteen months. He subsequently served as a reserve lieutenant in the U.S. Air Force.

Dunn graduated with a B.B.A. from the University of Mississippi in 1950. That same year, he married Betty Prichard, the daughter of a Memphis dentist. The couple had three children: Charles (Chuck), Gayle, and Julie. After working in the insurance industry for several years, he obtained his D.D.S. from the University of Tennessee Medical Units in Memphis in 1955. He initially practiced with his father-in-law before opening his own practice in Memphis.

Inspired by Barry Goldwater's views on conservatism, Dunn ran unsuccessfully for the Tennessee House of Representatives in 1962. He was elected Chairman of the Shelby County Republican Party, and as such campaigned for Goldwater in the 1964 presidential race. He was a delegate to the 1968 Republican National Convention, and campaigned for the eventual nominee, Richard Nixon.

== Governor ==
In 1970, Dunn sought the Republican nomination for governor. His opponents for the nomination included Speaker of the Tennessee House William L. Jenkins, Nashville industrialist Maxey Jarman, former chair of the state party Claude K. Robertson, and the 1962 nominee, Hubert Patty. Boosted in part by a large turnout in his populous home county of Shelby, Dunn won the nomination, edging his nearest opponent, Jarman, by ten thousand votes. His opponent in the general election was John Jay Hooker, the Democratic nominee.

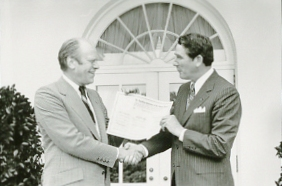
Dunn (right) with President Gerald Ford at the White House in 1974

Prior to the 1970 election, Democrats had controlled the governor's office for 50 years, and had largely dominated state politics since the end of Reconstruction. The GOP had last put up a candidate for governor in 1962. The social policies of the presidential administrations of John F. Kennedy and Lyndon B. Johnson, however, had alienated many Southern Democrats. Republicans began showing signs of life in the 1966 Senate race, when Republican Howard Baker Jr., defeated charismatic governor Frank G. Clement. In 1968, Nixon carried the state, Republicans won control of the state House of Representatives, and Republican Dan Kuykendall was elected to the Memphis-based 9th district congressional seat. With future federal judge Harry W. Wellford and future governor Lamar Alexander steering his campaign, Dunn defeated Hooker, 557,024 votes to 498,757, on election day.

Upon taking office, Dunn sought to unify the state, and offered state appointments to both Republicans and Democrats. Democrats, who controlled the state senate and had regained control of the state house, were initially uncooperative, with Speaker of the House James McKinney and Lieutenant-governor John S. Wilder (who was in the first term of what would become a 36-year tenure) trying at times to thwart his legislative agenda. In 1972, Ned McWherter was elected house speaker, and proved more open to cooperation with the Republican governor.

In spite of frequent Democratic opposition, Dunn managed to obtain a 0.6% increase in the state sales tax, allowing him to boost highway construction and give pay raises to state employees. He also created the Department of Economic and Community Development and the Department of General Services (to administer state purchases), and reorganized the Department of Personnel in an attempt to enhance efficiency in the hiring of state workers. Dunn supported the state's ratification of the 26th Amendment, which lowered the voting age to 18, in 1971.

In November 1973, Dunn hosted the Republican Governors Conference in Memphis, where President Nixon, beleaguered by the Watergate scandal, privately assured the governors present that no more surprises would arise from the scandal that would hurt the party. In his 2007 book, From a Standing Start, Dunn recalled being "shocked" and "disappointed" when a news broadcast on the following evening revealed there was an 18-and-half minute gap in the White House tapes.

== Later life and death ==
Dunn's term ended in 1975; at the time, the Constitution of Tennessee barred governors from serving consecutive terms. He returned to the private sector, working for several years as the vice president of public relations for the Nashville-based Hospital Corporation of America.

In 1986, Dunn once again ran for governor. He easily defeated Hubert Patty and Charles Vick in the Republican primary, but questions over party unity dogged his campaign. During his first term, Dunn had vetoed a bill calling for the establishment of a medical school at East Tennessee State University, reasoning that the state's three existing medical schools were adequate. Though the legislature overrode his veto, he nevertheless drew the enmity of powerful 1st district congressman Jimmy Quillen, in whose district the school was to be located. Quillen was still smarting over the veto more than a decade later, and withheld his endorsement in 1986. Without Quillen's endorsement, Dunn struggled in East Tennessee (normally a Republican stronghold), and was defeated in the general election by the Democratic nominee, Ned McWherter, 656,602 votes to 553,448.

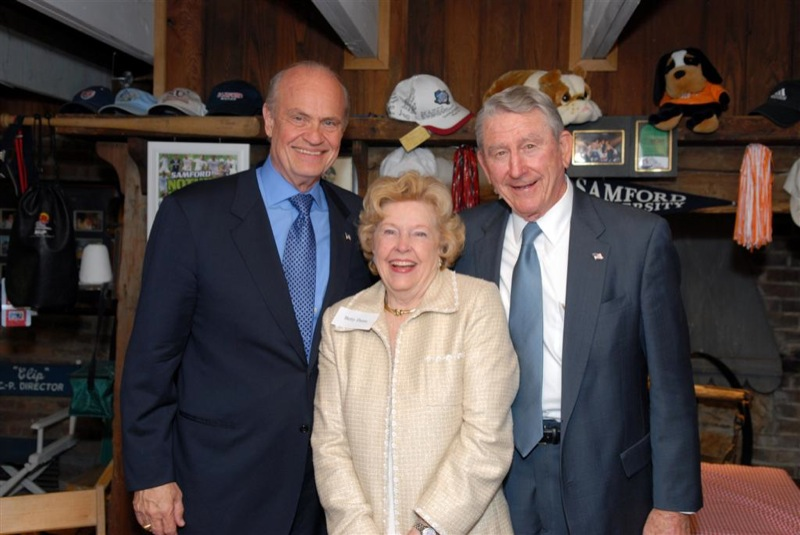
Dunn with his wife Betty Dunn and U.S. Senator Fred Thompson in 2007

After the 1986 campaign, Dunn focused on business and charitable interests. He worked as chairman of Memphis-based Medshares, and was a member of the boards of healthcare companies Phycor and Behavioral Healthcare Corporation. He was also active in the Tennessee-Tombigbee Waterway Development Authority, as well as with various charities, including the American Cancer Society, the Nashville Heart Association, and the United Way.

During his post-governorship, Dunn remained an "elder statesman" in the state Republican Party. He was chair of the state steering committee of the presidential campaign of George H. W. Bush in 1988, and was an elector for George W. Bush in 2004 and John McCain in 2008. In December 2011, he endorsed the eventual 2012 Republican presidential nominee, Mitt Romney. Romney said of Dunn: "No one is more highly regarded for his love of country and his public service."

Dunn died on September 28, 2024 from natural causes at his home in Nashville at the age of 97.

== Legacy ==
The Winfield Dunn Center, built during Dunn's tenure as governor, is home to the indoor athletic teams of Austin Peay State University. Buildings at Tennessee Technological University and the University of Memphis have been named for Dunn. The Dunn Dental Building, housing the University of Tennessee College of Dentistry at the University of Tennessee Health Science Center in Memphis, is also named after Governor Dunn. The golf course at Pickwick Landing State Park in Counce, Tennessee is named for the former governor. A bust honoring the governor is in the clinic lobby of the Dunn Building.

Two state routes in Tennessee are named for him: Winfield Dunn Parkway, a section of State Highway 66, connects Interstate 40 with U.S. Route 441 in Sevierville, and a portion of Interstate 269/Tennessee State Route 385 in Fayette and Shelby Counties is named for him between US 70 and US 72.

== See also ==
- List of governors of Tennessee

Party political offices
Preceded by Bob James	Chair of the Shelby County Republican Party; 1963–1967	Succeeded by Harry W. Wellford
Vacant Title last held by Hubert Patty	Republican nominee for Governor of Tennessee; 1970	Succeeded by Lamar Alexander
Preceded by Linwood Holton	Chair of the Republican Governors Association; 1973–1974	Succeeded by Kit Bond
Preceded by Lamar Alexander	Republican nominee for Governor of Tennessee; 1986	Succeeded by Dwight Henry
Political offices
Preceded by Buford Ellington	Governor of Tennessee; 1971–1975	Succeeded by Ray Blanton
