= 1998 Tennessee gubernatorial election =

- November 3, 1998
- Turnout: 32.53% ▼24.09 pp
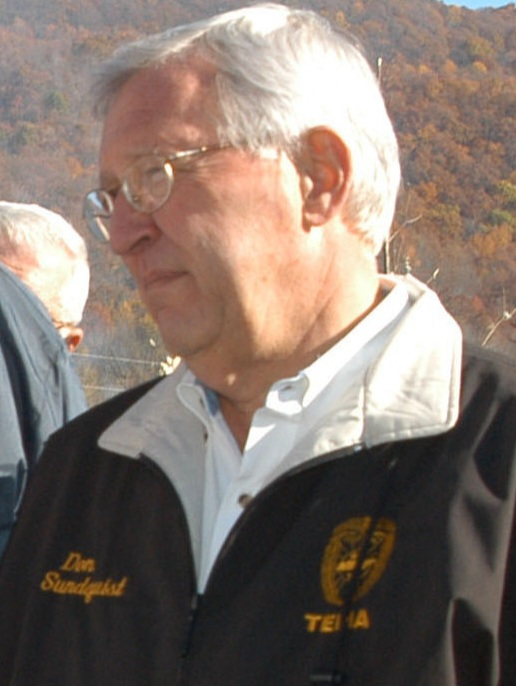

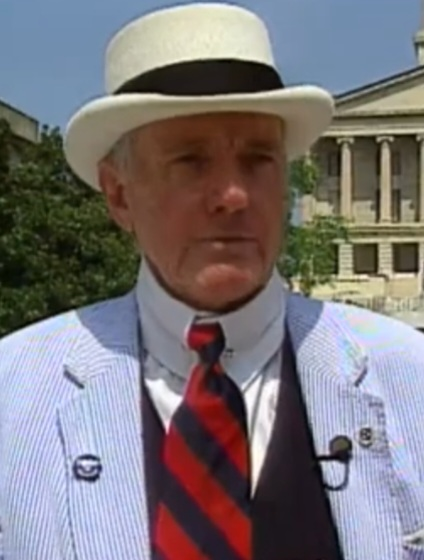
Nominee	Don Sundquist	John Jay Hooker
Party	Republican	Democratic
Popular vote	669,973	287,750
Percentage	68.63%	29.48%
- County results Sundquist: 40–50% 50–60% 60–70% 70–80% 80–90% Hooker: 40–50% 60–70%
Governor before election
Don Sundquist
Republican
Elected Governor
Don Sundquist
Republican

The 1998 Tennessee gubernatorial election took place on November 3, 1998, to elect the governor of Tennessee. Incumbent Republican governor Don Sundquist won re-election, defeating Democratic candidate John Jay Hooker.

Sundquist became the first Republican gubernatorial nominee to get over 60% of the vote since Dewitt Clinton Senter did in 1869. Sundquist carried all but two counties (Lake and Van Buren).

== Aftermath ==
Shortly after winning re-election, Sundquist implemented the ConnectTen program, which made Tennessee the first state in the nation to connect its schools and libraries to the Internet.

== Republican primary ==
=== Results ===
Republican primary results
Party	Candidate	Votes	%
Republican	Don Sundquist (incumbent)	358,786	92.50%
Republican	Shirley Beck-Vosse	28,951	7.46%
Write-ins		123	0.03%
Total votes		387,860	100.00

== Democratic primary ==
=== Results ===
Democratic primary results
Party	Candidate	Votes	%
Democratic	John J. Hooker	123,384	41.34%
Democratic	Mike Whitaker	83,542	27.99%
Democratic	Sherry Whittenberg	28,822	9.66%
Democratic	Luther Best	25,565	8.57%
Democratic	Donald Jackson	18,458	6.18%
Democratic	Virginia Nyabongo	12,352	4.14%
Democratic	Jerral Parris	5,740	1.92%
Write-ins		603	0.20%
Total votes		298,466	100.00%

== General election ==
1998 Tennessee gubernatorial election
Party	Candidate	Votes	%	±%
Republican	Don Sundquist (incumbent)	669,973	68.63%	+14.36%
Democratic	John Jay Hooker	287,750	29.48%	−15.19%
Independent	George Alexander Hamilton, Sr.	5,899	0.60%	N/A
Independent	Irwin W. Gibbs	4,651	0.48%	N/A
Independent	Thomas E. Smith II	1,851	0.19%	N/A
Independent	Karl Smithson	1,841	0.19%	N/A
N/A	Write-ins	548	0.00%	N/A
Total votes		976,236	100.00%	
Republican hold		Swing		

== See also ==
- 1998 United States House of Representatives elections in Tennessee
