= 2002 United States Senate election in Tennessee =

- November 5, 2002
- Turnout: 50.40% ▼12.37 pp
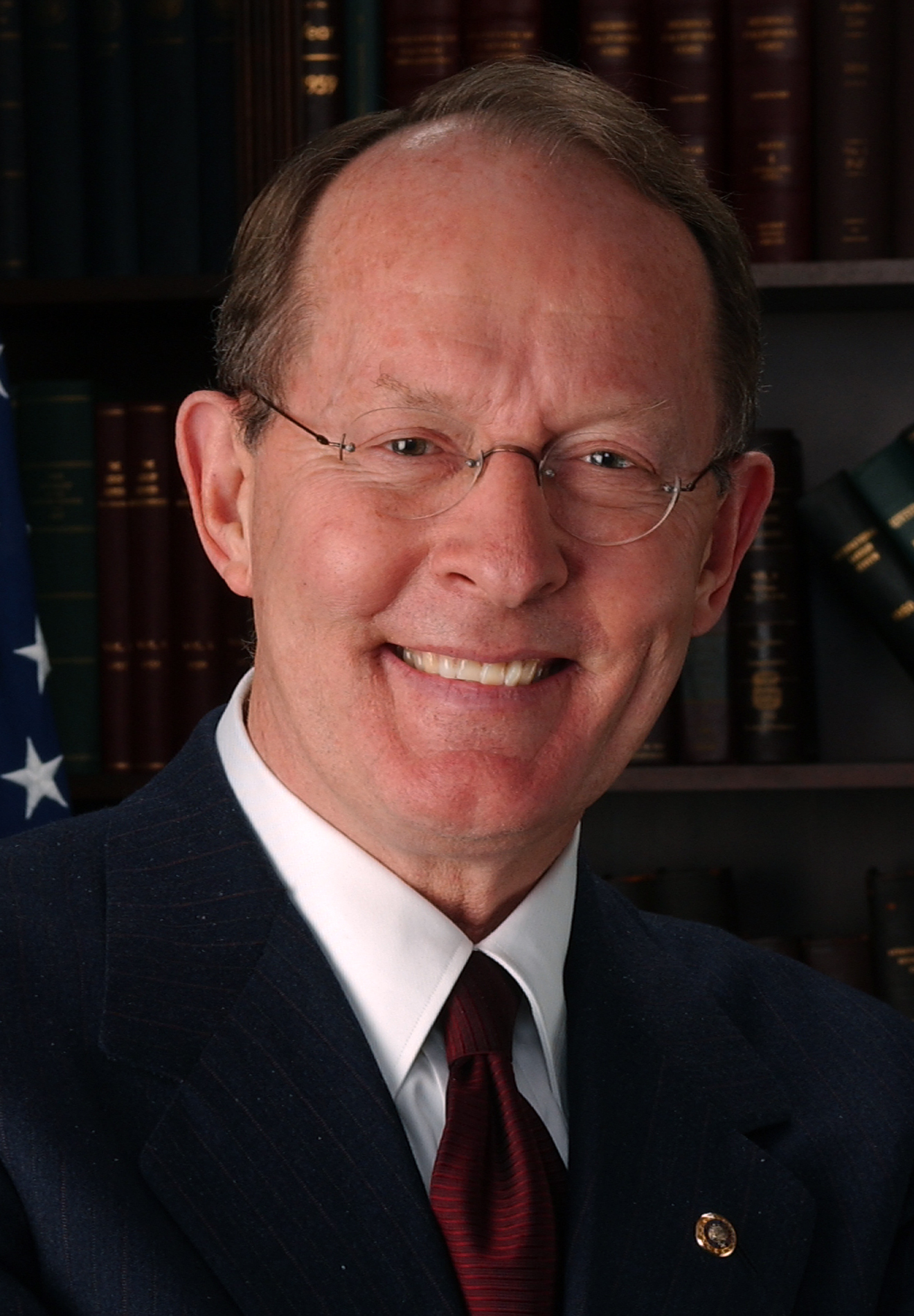

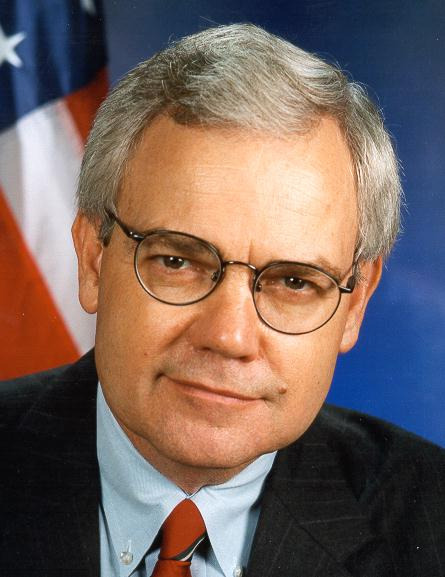
Nominee	Lamar Alexander	Bob Clement
Party	Republican	Democratic
Popular vote	891,498	728,232
Percentage	54.28%	44.34%
- Alexander: 40–50% 50–60% 60—70% 70–80% Clement: 40–50% 50–60% 60–70%
U.S. senator before election
Fred Thompson
Republican
Elected U.S. Senator
Lamar Alexander
Republican

The 2002 United States Senate election in Tennessee was held on November 5, 2002, to elect a member of the United States Senate to represent the state of Tennessee. Incumbent Republican Senator Fred Thompson announced that he would not seek re-election. Former Republican Governor Lamar Alexander won the open seat, defeating Democratic Congressman Bob Clement with 54.3% of the vote.

With this election, Alexander became the first Tennessean to be popularly elected both governor and senator. At the age of 62, Alexander also became the oldest elected freshman US senator from Tennessee since Democrat Lawrence D. Tyson in 1924, which he held until 2018 when Marsha Blackburn surpassed him at the age of 66.

== Background ==
In early 2002, Republican Senator Fred Thompson announced that he would not seek re-election to the United States Senate, reversing earlier indications that he intended to run for a second full term. His retirement created an open-seat contest in a state that had trended Republican in recent federal elections, contributing to increased attention on the race within Tennessee.

The open seat drew involvement from both state and national party organizations. Lamar Alexander, a former governor of Tennessee and United States secretary of education, entered the race and won the Republican nomination. His prior statewide service and fundraising totals placed him in a strong position heading into the general election. President George W. Bush, who had a 60% approval rating in the state, participated in campaign events for Alexander, including fundraising and public appearances in Tennessee during the general election.

Bob Clement, a member of the United States House of Representatives and the son of former Tennessee governor Frank G. Clement, won the Democratic nomination.

Alexander raised $2 million through June 2002. Clement attacked the governor for his corporate connections and business dealings. By October, Clement had nearly raised $900,000, while Alexander raised almost $3 million. Alexander was also endorsed by the NRA Political Victory Fund.

== Republican primary ==
=== Campaign ===
The Republican primary between former Governor Lamar Alexander and U.S. Representative Ed Bryant involved competitive campaigning and ideological differences that drew attention within the state. Bryant positioned himself as the more conservative candidate, running television advertisements criticizing Alexander's record and emphasizing his own conservative credentials. Alexander's campaign responded by highlighting his prior experience in statewide and national office. Observers noted that the tone of the advertisements and the exchanges between the campaigns reflected the ongoing battle between moderate and conservative factions of the Tennessee Republican Party during the primary.

Political scientists later observed that although Bryant’s campaign framed the race around conservative principles, he was unable to consolidate the state’s religious right base behind his candidacy, contributing to Alexander’s victory in the primary.

=== Candidates ===
- Lamar Alexander, former U.S. secretary of education, former governor of Tennessee
- Ed Bryant, U.S. representative
- James E. DuBose
- Christopher G. Fenner
- June Griffin, activist
- Mary Taylor-Shelby, perennial candidate
- Michael Brent Todd

=== Results ===
Republican primary results
Party	Candidate	Votes	%
Republican	Lamar Alexander	295,052	53.79%
Republican	Ed Bryant	233,678	42.60%
Republican	Mary Taylor-Shelby	5,589	1.02%
Republican	June Griffin	4,930	0.90%
Republican	Michael Brent Todd	4,002	0.73%
Republican	James E. DuBose	3,572	0.65%
Republican	Christopher G. Fenner	1,552	0.28%
Republican	Write-ins	107	0.03%
Total votes		548,482	100.00%

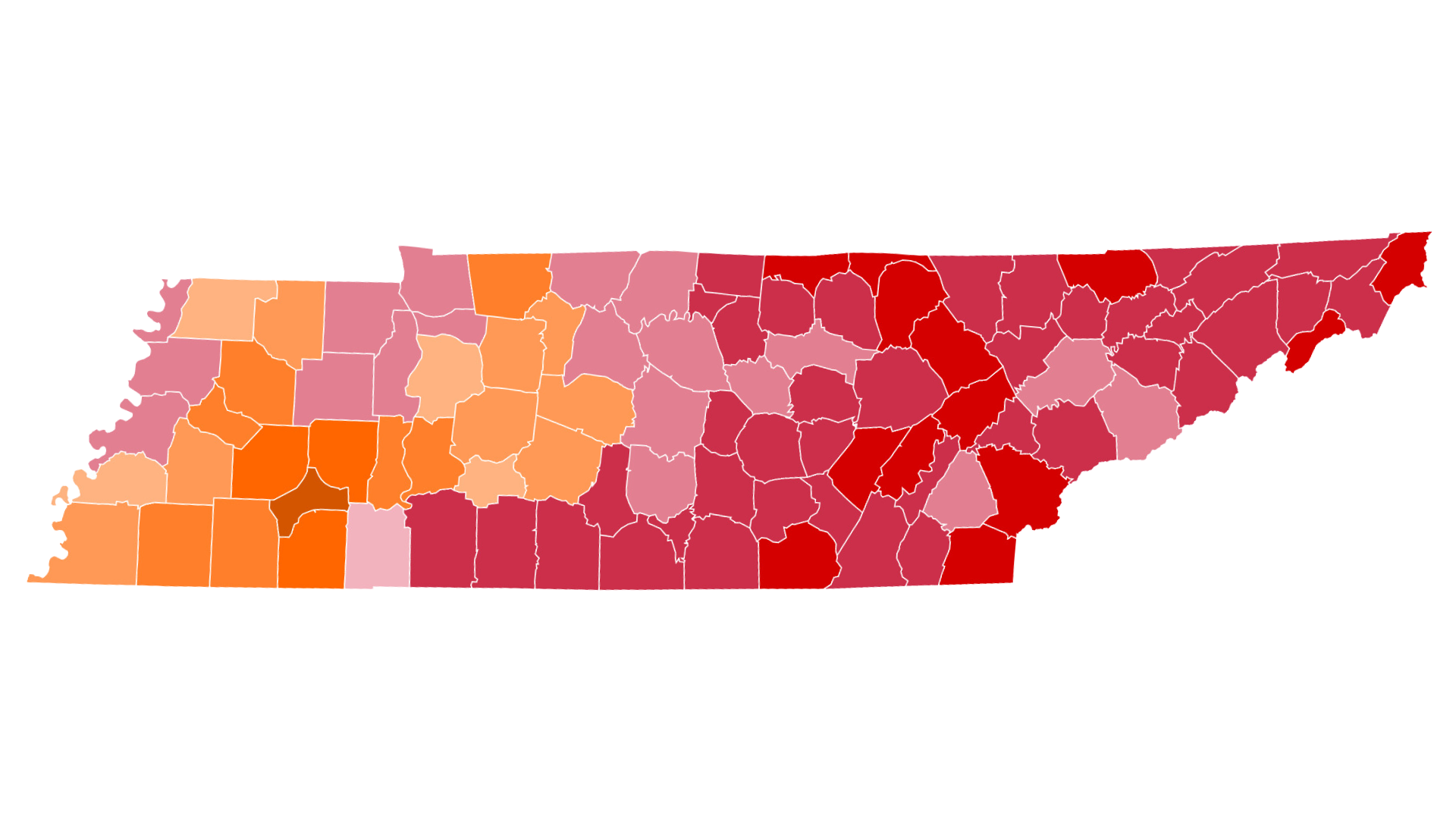
Results by county: Alexander: 40–50%; 50–60%; 60–70%; 70–80%; Bryant: 40–50%; 50–60%; 50–60%; 70–80%; 80–90%

== Democratic primary ==
=== Candidates ===
- Bob Clement, U.S. representative and candidate for governor in 1978
- Gary G. Davis, perennial candidate
- Michael L. Hampstead
- Cher A. Hopkey
- Alvin M. Strauss

=== Results ===
Democratic primary results
Party	Candidate	Votes	%
Democratic	Bob Clement	418,172	82.18%
Democratic	Gary G. Davis	50,563	9.94%
Democratic	Cher A. Hopkey	14,481	2.85%
Democratic	Michael L. Hampstead	12,940	2.54%
Democratic	Alvin M. Strauss	12,241	2.41%
Democratic	Write-ins	478	0.08%
Total votes		508,875	100.00%

== General election ==
=== Debates ===
- Complete video of debate, September 30, 2002
- Complete video of debate, October 6, 2002
- Complete video of debate, October 13, 2002
- Complete video of debate, October 20, 2002

=== Predictions ===
Source	Ranking	As of
Sabato's Crystal Ball	Likely R	November 4, 2002

=== Polling ===
Poll source	Date(s) administered	Sample size (Note: Key: A – all adults RV – registered voters LV – likely voters V – unclear)	Margin of error	Lamar Alexander (R)	Bob Clement (D)	Other / Undecided
SurveyUSA	October 26–28, 2002	726 (LV)	± 3.8%	52%	41%	7%

In a September poll from the Knoxville News Sentinel, Alexander was up 45% to 27%. In a DNSC poll during the same month, Alexander was up 49% to 42%. A mid-October Zogby poll had the governor leading 49% to 36%. A late October WREG-TV poll had Alexander leading 45% to 36%.

=== Results ===
United States Senate election in Tennessee, 2002
Party	Candidate	Votes	%	±%
Republican	Lamar Alexander	891,498	54.28%	−7.09%
Democratic	Bob Clement	728,232	44.34%	+7.52%
Independent	John Jay Hooker	6,401	0.39%	N/A
Independent	Wesley M. Baker	6,106	0.37%	N/A
Independent	Connie Gammon	5,349	0.33%	N/A
Independent	Karl Stanley Davidson	2,217	0.13%	N/A
Independent	Basil Marceaux	1,170	0.07%	N/A
Write-ins		356	0.02%	N/A
Majority		163,266	9.94%	−14.61%
Turnout		1,642,432	50.40%	
Republican hold		Swing		

=== By county ===
County	Lamar Alexander Republican		Bob Clement Democratic		John Jay Hooker Independent		Wesley Baker Independent		Others Independent		Total votes
County	#	%	#	%	#	%	#	%	#	%	Total votes
Anderson	12,700	55.2%	9,957	43.3%	101	0.4%	105	0.5%	136	0.6%	22,999
Bedford	4,898	49.1%	4,918	49.3%	58	0.6%	56	0.6%	46	0.5%	9,976
Benton	2,030	35.8%	3,530	62.3%	27	0.5%	23	0.4%	54	1.0%	5,664
Bledsoe	1,934	53.9%	1,603	44.6%	6	0.2%	19	0.5%	29	0.8%	3,591
Blount	21,061	63.9%	11,471	34.8%	105	0.3%	130	0.4%	176	0.5%	32,943
Bradley	16,489	69.7%	6,782	28.7%	104	0.4%	96	0.4%	196	0.8%	23,667
Campbell	4,392	48.6%	4,527	50.1%	31	0.3%	25	0.3%	61	0.7%	9,036
Cannon	1,671	41.4%	2,292	56.8%	23	0.6%	20	0.5%	27	0.7%	4,033
Carroll	4,540	49.1%	4,518	48.9%	42	0.5%	72	0.8%	66	0.7%	9,238
Carter	10,798	68.7%	4,542	28.9%	63	0.4%	123	0.8%	185	1.2%	15,711
Cheatham	5,647	51.4%	5,209	47.4%	43	0.4%	31	0.3%	50	0.5%	10,980
Chester	2,518	57.5%	1,809	41.3%	11	0.3%	20	0.5%	21	0.5%	4,379
Claiborne	3,666	53.4%	3,045	44.4%	33	0.5%	50	0.7%	65	0.9%	6,859
Clay	1,004	43.2%	1,277	54.9%	19	0.8%	14	0.6%	11	0.5%	2,325
Cocke	4,859	58.1%	3,298	39.5%	53	0.6%	63	0.8%	83	1.0%	8,356
Coffee	7,541	50.1%	7,322	48.7%	57	0.4%	37	0.2%	80	0.5%	15,037
Crockett	2,071	48.0%	2,171	50.3%	25	0.6%	16	0.4%	35	0.8%	4,318
Cumberland	9,942	58.8%	6,714	39.7%	51	0.3%	77	0.5%	117	0.7%	16,901
Davidson	70,974	42.9%	92,994	56.2%	692	0.4%	261	0.2%	680	0.4%	165,601
Decatur	1,802	43.5%	2,258	54.5%	21	0.5%	17	0.4%	42	1.0%	4,140
DeKalb	1,973	40.1%	2,869	58.3%	29	0.6%	18	0.4%	29	0.6%	4,918
Dickson	5,910	43.0%	7,731	56.2%	47	0.3%	23	0.2%	47	0.3%	13,758
Dyer	5,475	53.2%	4,610	44.8%	57	0.6%	44	0.4%	113	1.1%	10,299
Fayette	5,744	60.7%	3,589	37.9%	15	0.2%	64	0.7%	50	0.5%	9,462
Fentress	2,653	54.6%	2,131	43.9%	20	0.4%	14	0.3%	38	0.8%	4,856
Franklin	5,499	47.1%	5,994	51.3%	54	0.5%	40	0.3%	96	0.8%	11,683
Gibson	7,326	50.2%	6,947	47.6%	89	0.6%	106	0.7%	128	0.9%	14,596
Giles	3,559	46.3%	3,941	51.3%	59	0.8%	42	0.5%	81	1.1%	7,682
Grainger	3,085	58.6%	2,102	39.9%	21	0.4%	21	0.4%	36	0.7%	5,265
Greene	10,414	65.6%	5,131	32.3%	73	0.5%	119	0.7%	142	0.9%	15,879
Grundy	1,220	33.0%	2,439	65.9%	9	0.2%	17	0.5%	16	0.4%	3,701
Hamblen	10,115	61.6%	6,058	36.9%	54	0.3%	85	0.5%	115	0.7%	16,427
Hamilton	53,070	60.6%	33,433	38.2%	220	0.3%	224	0.3%	569	0.7%	87,516
Hancock	1,180	62.7%	666	35.4%	7	0.4%	13	0.7%	16	0.9%	1,882
Hardeman	3,002	46.9%	3,266	51.0%	36	0.6%	49	0.8%	47	0.7%	6,400
Hardin	3,895	52.5%	3,425	46.2%	23	0.3%	22	0.3%	51	0.7%	7,416
Hawkins	8,658	62.6%	4,893	35.4%	61	0.4%	97	0.7%	124	0.9%	13,833
Haywood	2,274	43.2%	2,929	55.6%	25	0.5%	16	0.3%	24	0.5%	5,268
Henderson	4,096	57.7%	2,858	40.3%	45	0.6%	32	0.5%	68	1.0%	7,099
Henry	4,097	43.0%	5,263	55.2%	43	0.5%	48	0.5%	86	0.9%	9,537
Hickman	2,560	39.2%	3,885	59.5%	23	0.4%	22	0.3%	40	0.6%	6,530
Houston	763	29.4%	1,794	69.1%	14	0.5%	10	0.4%	14	0.5%	2,595
Humphreys	2,073	34.3%	3,891	64.5%	24	0.4%	19	0.3%	28	0.5%	6,035
Jackson	1,133	33.0%	2,247	65.5%	17	0.5%	19	0.6%	16	0.5%	3,432
Jefferson	7,266	61.7%	4,269	36.3%	56	0.5%	82	0.7%	98	0.8%	11,771
Johnson	3,101	70.3%	1,227	27.8%	23	0.5%	29	0.7%	34	0.8%	4,414
Knox	70,793	61.8%	42,106	36.8%	367	0.3%	568	0.5%	690	0.6%	114,524
Lake	506	38.4%	778	59.0%	14	1.1%	8	0.6%	13	1.0%	1,319
Lauderdale	2,904	44.7%	3,456	53.2%	49	0.8%	35	0.5%	47	0.7%	6,491
Lawrence	6,381	53.5%	5,380	45.1%	41	0.3%	54	0.5%	60	0.5%	11,916
Lewis	1,730	44.6%	2,073	53.4%	22	0.6%	15	0.4%	39	1.0%	3,879
Lincoln	4,523	52.2%	3,967	45.8%	48	0.6%	35	0.4%	86	1.0%	8,659
Loudon	9,398	66.1%	4,668	32.8%	31	0.2%	33	0.2%	89	0.6%	14,219
Macon	2,476	48.9%	2,495	49.3%	33	0.7%	27	0.5%	29	0.6%	5,060
Madison	15,640	56.1%	11,879	42.6%	99	0.4%	97	0.3%	149	0.5%	27,864
Marion	3,640	45.2%	4,281	53.2%	38	0.5%	35	0.4%	53	0.7%	8,047
Marshall	3,355	44.9%	3,971	53.2%	47	0.6%	34	0.5%	62	0.8%	7,469
Maury	10,240	49.8%	10,053	48.9%	87	0.4%	55	0.3%	131	0.6%	20,566
McMinn	8,410	61.5%	4,989	36.5%	63	0.5%	89	0.7%	115	0.8%	13,666
McNairy	3,954	52.0%	3,533	46.5%	29	0.4%	32	0.4%	53	0.7%	7,601
Meigs	1,541	54.9%	1,210	43.1%	12	0.4%	16	0.6%	26	0.9%	2,805
Monroe	6,469	58.8%	4,396	39.9%	37	0.3%	42	0.4%	65	0.6%	11,009
Montgomery	15,824	49.6%	15,645	49.0%	114	0.4%	135	0.4%	183	0.6%	31,901
Moore	1,031	50.7%	984	48.4%	7	0.3%	4	0.2%	8	0.4%	2,034
Morgan	2,575	47.5%	2,811	51.9%	9	0.2%	5	0.1%	21	0.4%	5,421
Obion	4,593	45.4%	5,319	52.6%	48	0.5%	42	0.4%	106	1.0%	10,108
Overton	2,071	36.3%	3,565	62.4%	24	0.4%	20	0.4%	32	0.6%	5,712
Perry	857	39.1%	1,273	58.1%	15	0.7%	19	0.9%	26	1.2%	2,190
Pickett	1,162	57.2%	844	41.5%	11	0.5%	6	0.3%	9	0.4%	2,032
Polk	2,259	49.7%	2,215	48.7%	20	0.4%	13	0.3%	39	0.9%	4,546
Putnam	9,340	50.4%	8,829	47.7%	105	0.6%	97	0.5%	145	0.8%	18,516
Rhea	5,115	65.9%	2,561	33.0%	14	0.2%	34	0.4%	43	0.6%	7,767
Roane	9,693	55.7%	7,445	42.8%	68	0.4%	82	0.5%	111	0.6%	17,399
Robertson	7,948	46.1%	9,110	52.8%	44	0.3%	50	0.3%	102	0.6%	17,254
Rutherford	29,018	56.7%	21,613	42.2%	202	0.4%	96	0.2%	250	0.5%	51,179
Scott	2,414	51.3%	2,202	46.8%	20	0.4%	34	0.7%	33	0.7%	4,703
Sequatchie	1,765	48.5%	1,826	50.2%	10	0.3%	13	0.4%	26	0.7%	3,640
Sevier	13,979	68.3%	6,223	30.4%	58	0.3%	70	0.3%	129	0.6%	20,459
Shelby	117,929	49.5%	117,629	49.3%	971	0.4%	622	0.3%	1,251	0.5%	238,402
Smith	2,137	37.1%	3,555	61.7%	22	0.4%	16	0.3%	29	0.5%	5,759
Stewart	1,317	34.3%	2,436	63.5%	29	0.8%	10	0.3%	45	1.2%	3,837
Sullivan	28,495	67.7%	12,872	30.6%	123	0.3%	247	0.6%	384	0.9%	42,121
Sumner	23,638	56.6%	17,650	42.3%	137	0.3%	123	0.3%	212	0.5%	41,760
Tipton	8,821	64.1%	4,678	34.0%	65	0.5%	72	0.5%	120	0.9%	13,756
Trousdale	786	34.5%	1,461	64.2%	7	0.3%	9	0.4%	12	0.5%	2,275
Unicoi	3,189	69.1%	1,335	28.9%	13	0.3%	31	0.7%	49	1.1%	4,617
Union	2,413	54.3%	1,984	44.6%	15	0.3%	14	0.3%	20	0.4%	4,446
Van Buren	673	38.2%	1,063	60.4%	9	0.5%	6	0.3%	9	0.5%	1,760
Warren	5,219	44.1%	6,414	54.1%	69	0.6%	57	0.5%	87	0.7%	11,846
Washington	20,195	67.9%	8,994	30.3%	100	0.3%	180	0.6%	256	0.9%	29,725
Wayne	2,421	61.2%	1,486	37.6%	10	0.3%	20	0.5%	16	0.4%	3,953
Weakley	5,138	47.7%	5,434	50.4%	54	0.5%	63	0.6%	87	0.8%	10,776
White	3,373	45.9%	3,831	52.2%	36	0.5%	38	0.5%	63	0.9%	7,341
Williamson	36,272	70.2%	15,044	29.1%	134	0.3%	73	0.1%	146	0.3%	51,669
Wilson	17,122	56.3%	12,904	42.4%	118	0.4%	99	0.3%	172	0.6%	30,415
Total	891,420	54.3%	728,295	44.3%	6,407	0.4%	6,105	0.4%	10,205	0.6%	1,642,432

==== Counties that flipped from Republican to Democratic ====
- Bedford (largest city: Shelbyville)
- Campbell (largest city: LaFollette)
- Cannon (largest town: Woodbury)
- Clay (largest city: Celina)
- Crockett (largest city: Bells)
- Davidson (largest city: Nashville)
- Dickson (largest city: Dickson)
- Franklin (largest city: Winchester)
- Giles (largest city: Pulaski)
- Henry (largest city: Paris)
- Lewis (largest city: Hohenwald)
- Macon (largest city: Lafayette)
- Marion (largest town: Jasper)
- Marshall (largest city: Lewisburg)
- Morgan (largest community: Coalfield)
- Obion (largest city: Union City)
- Robertson (largest city: Springfield)
- Sequatchie (largest city: Dunlap)
- Stewart (largest city: Dover)
- Warren (largest city: McMinnville)
- Weakley (largest city: Martin)
- White (largest city: Sparta)

== See also ==
- 2002 United States Senate elections
- 2002 Tennessee gubernatorial election
- 2002 Tennessee elections
