= Kyle Testerman =

American mayor (1934–2015)

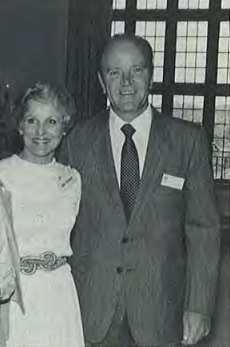
- Testerman (right) in attendance of the 1982 World's Fair in Knoxville with his wife (left).

Mayor of Knoxville
- In office 1972–1975
- Preceded by: Leonard R. Rogers
- Succeeded by: Randy Tyree
- In office 1984–1987
- Preceded by: Randy Tyree
- Succeeded by: Victor Ashe

Personal details
- Born: Kyle Copenhaver Testerman; December 27, 1934 Knoxville, Tennessee
- Died: April 11, 2015 (aged 80) Knoxville, Tennessee

Kyle Copenhaver Testerman (December 27, 1934 – April 11, 2015) was mayor of Knoxville, Tennessee from 1972 to 1975, and again from 1984 to 1987. Testerman was a Republican. He was the father of professional tennis player Ben Testerman.

== First term ==
Testerman was a Knoxville lawyer and businessman and a member of the Knoxville City Council when he first ran for mayor in 1971, against incumbent Leonard Rogers. A major issue in the campaign was the selling of liquor by the drink, something which was at the time illegal in Knoxville. Rogers was opposed to it, but Testerman argued that liquor by the drink was necessary to attract business and tourism to Knoxville. After winning the election, Testerman brought a liquor by the drink referendum to the voters, who approved it two-to-one.

With the opening of West Town Mall in 1974, business began to drain out of the downtown Knoxville area. The city began to look for redevelopment opportunities, and at the request of the Downtown Knoxville Association, Testerman appointed an advisory committee to conduct a study on the possibility of hosting the 1982 World's Fair. The committee found it to be feasible, but Testerman was not able to oversee the project as mayor, as he was voted out of office in favor of Randy Tyree in 1975.

A possible contribution to Testerman's loss to Tyree was dissatisfaction with his handling of garbage workers in 1974. Testerman fired around three hundred workers in July of that year after they went on strike because of disputes about wages and overtime pay. At the end of the year, however, following conditions agreed to in court, the mayor announced retroactive pay raises for the unionized workers.

== Second term ==
In 1984, Testerman again became mayor of Knoxville. The World's Fair over, the city was now deeply in debt and involved in discussions about what to do with the site of the Fair and the structures left over from it, which were still owned by the federal government. As Testerman summarized the problem, "It was wonderful and grand -- then BAM, the lights went out, the music stopped playing and the ladies stopped singing and then they said what are we going to do on the site?"

One particular problem was a large, steel and glass pavilion which was built to be a model of solar efficiency but which did not work correctly and for which the city had no use after the Fair was over. Testerman, acting for the city, ended up winning the $12.4 million structure at auction for $950,000, thus reclaiming land which had belonged to Knoxville to begin with. The building was a "liability," Testerman told reporters, but it was on "a nice piece of land." Further work or redevelopment on the site was delayed during Testerman's term, partly due to his doubts about a large-scale redevelopment plan, and partly due to the entanglements of Jake Butcher, a would-be World's Fair site redeveloper who was convicted of bank fraud.

In 1986, with County Executive Dwight Kessel, Testerman formed the Knoxville Coalition for the Homeless to conduct studies about homelessness, an endemic problem in the area. He died in hospice care on April 11, 2015.

== Notes ==
Preceded by Leonard Rogers	Mayor of Knoxville, Tennessee; 1972–1975	Succeeded by Randy Tyree
Preceded by Randy Tyree	Mayor of Knoxville, Tennessee; 1984–1987	Succeeded by Victor Ashe
