= 1974 Tennessee gubernatorial election =

- November 5, 1974
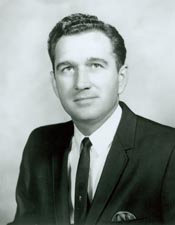

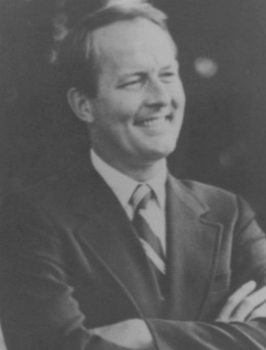
Nominee	Ray Blanton	Lamar Alexander
Party	Democratic	Republican
Popular vote	576,833	455,467
Percentage	55.43%	43.77%
- County results Blanton: 50–60% 60–70% 70–80% 80–90% Alexander: 40–50% 50–60% 60–70%
Governor before election
Winfield Dunn
Republican
Elected Governor
Ray Blanton
Democratic

The 1974 Tennessee gubernatorial election was held on November 5, 1974, to elect the next governor of Tennessee. Incumbent Republican governor Winfield Dunn was ineligible to run for re-election, as the Constitution of Tennessee prohibited governors from serving consecutive terms at the time. Democratic nominee Ray Blanton defeated Republican opponent Lamar Alexander with 55.4% of the vote.

With this win, Blanton flipped the state back into Democratic control, with the state legislature also being controlled by Democrats.

== Background ==
Republican candidate Lamar Alexander worked as a legislative assistant for Senator Howard Baker. While a staffer, he was briefly roommates with future U.S. Senator Trent Lott. In 1969, he worked for Bryce Harlow, President Richard Nixon's executive assistant. In 1970, he moved back to Tennessee, serving as campaign manager for Memphis dentist Winfield Dunn's successful gubernatorial bid.

Alexander faced the Democratic nominee, Ray Blanton, a former congressman and unsuccessful 1972 Senate candidate. Blanton attacked Alexander for his service under Richard Nixon, who had resigned in disgrace several months earlier as a result of the Watergate scandal.

== Aftermath ==
Following Ray Blanton's inauguration, Blanton called for a state income tax, but the state legislature, fearing a revolt from voters, refused to consider it, and instead raised the state sales tax. Blanton overhauled the state's excise and franchise tax laws, and revised the state's Hall income tax to provide relief for the state's elderly residents. He also elevated the state's Office of Tourism to a cabinet-level department, making Tennessee the first state in the nation to do so, and upgraded the state's retirement system.

== Primary elections ==
Primary elections were held on August 1, 1974.

=== Democratic primary ===
21.9% of the voting age population participated in the Democratic primary.

==== Candidates ====
- Ross Bass, former United States senator
- Ray Blanton, former U.S. representative, candidate in the 1972 U.S. Senate election
- Jake Butcher, businessman
- Washington Butler
- Hudley Crockett, news anchor
- Jonnie D. Elkins
- Franklin Haney, businessman
- David Pack, former Tennessee attorney general
- James Powers
- Stan Snodgrass
- Charles Gordon Vick, perennial candidate
- Thomas A. Wiseman Jr., former Tennessee state treasurer

==== Results ====
Democratic primary results
Party	Candidate	Votes	%
Democratic	Ray Blanton	148,062	22.73
Democratic	Jake Butcher	131,412	20.18
Democratic	Thomas A. Wiseman Jr.	89,061	13.67
Democratic	Hudley Crockett	86,852	13.34
Democratic	Franklin Haney	84,155	12.92
Democratic	Stan Snodgrass	40,211	6.17
Democratic	Ross Bass	26,091	4.01
Democratic	Washington Butler	15,562	2.39
Democratic	David Pack	13,625	2.09
Democratic	James Powers	13,464	2.07
Democratic	Jonnie D. Elkins	1,694	0.26
Democratic	Charles Gordon Vick	1,121	0.17
Total votes		651,320	100.00

=== Republican primary ===
8.6% of the voting age population participated in the Republican primary.

==== Candidates ====
- Lamar Alexander, attorney
- Dortch Oldham, businessman
- Melvin Waldron
- Nat T. Winston Jr., former commissioner of mental health for Tennessee

==== Results ====
Republican primary results
Party	Candidate	Votes	%
Republican	Lamar Alexander	120,773	48.48
Republican	Nat T. Winston Jr.	90,980	36.52
Republican	Dortch Oldham	35,683	14.32
Republican	Melvin Waldron	1,674	0.67
Total votes		249,112	100.00

== General election ==
=== Candidates ===
Major party candidates

- Lamar Alexander, Republican
- Ray Blanton, Democratic

Other candidates

- Jack Comer, Independent
- Hubert David Patty, Independent
- James Reesor, Independent
- Alfred W. Taylor, Independent
- Arnold Joseph Zandi, Independent

=== Results ===
1974 Tennessee gubernatorial election
Party	Candidate	Votes	%	±%
Democratic	Ray Blanton	576,833	55.43%	
Republican	Lamar Alexander	455,467	43.77%	
Independent	Jack Comer	2,431	0.23%	
Independent	Alfred W. Taylor	2,338	0.23%	
Independent	James Reesor	1,986	0.19%	
Independent	Hubert David Patty	845	0.08%	
Independent	Arnold Joseph Zandi	784	0.08%	
Write-in		30	0.00%	
Majority		121,366		
Turnout		1,040,714		
Democratic gain from Republican		Swing		

== Works cited ==
- Steed, Robert; Moreland, Laurence; Baker, Tod, eds. (1980). Party Politics in the South. Praeger Publishers. ISBN 0030565863.
