= 1982 Tennessee gubernatorial election =

- November 2, 1982
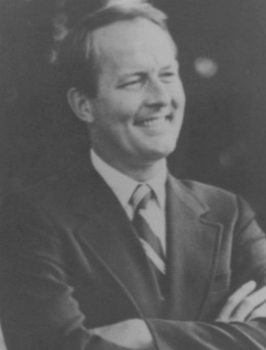

Nominee	Lamar Alexander	Randy Tyree
Party	Republican	Democratic
Popular vote	737,693	500,937
Percentage	59.56%	40.44%
- County results Alexander: 50–60% 60–70% 70–80% 80–90% Tyree: 50–60% 60–70% 70–80%
Governor before election
Lamar Alexander
Republican
Elected Governor
Lamar Alexander
Republican

The 1982 Tennessee gubernatorial election was held on November 2, 1982, to elect the governor of Tennessee. Incumbent Republican governor Lamar Alexander was now qualified to run for re-election because of Tennessee's 1978 constitutional amendment allowing governors to serve a second consecutive four-year term. Alexander ran for re-election and defeated Democratic nominee Randy Tyree, the mayor of Knoxville, with 59.6% of the vote.

Alexander was the first Republican to be re-elected governor since 1912.

== Primary elections ==
Primary elections were held on August 5, 1982.

=== Republican primary ===
Lamar Alexander was unopposed.

=== Democratic primary ===
==== Candidates ====
- Randy Tyree, Mayor of Knoxville
- Anna Belle Clement O'Brien, State Senator
- Tom Henry
- Tommy McKnight
- John G. Love
- Luther M. Kindall
- James W. Thomas
- Virginia Nyabongo
- Boyce McCall

==== Results ====
Democratic primary results
Party	Candidate	Votes	%
Democratic	Randy Tyree	318,205	50.05%
Democratic	Anna Belle Clement O'Brien	254,500	40.03%
Democratic	Tom Henry	19,453	3.06%
Democratic	Tommy McKnight	10,761	1.69%
Democratic	John G. Love	10,600	1.67%
Democratic	Luther M. Kindall	7,792	1.23%
Democratic	James W. Thomas	6,052	0.95%
Democratic	Virginia Nyabongo	5,885	0.93%
Democratic	Boyce McCall	2,577	0.41%
Total votes		635,825	100.00%

== General election ==
=== Candidates ===
- Lamar Alexander, Republican
- Randy Tyree, Democratic

=== Results ===
1982 Tennessee gubernatorial election
Party	Candidate	Votes	%	±%
Republican	Lamar Alexander (incumbent)	737,693	59.56%	+3.72%
Democratic	Randy Tyree	500,937	40.44%	−3.72%
Majority		237,026		
Turnout		1,238,927		
Republican hold		Swing		

== See also ==
- 1982 United States House of Representatives elections in Tennessee
- 1982 United States Senate election in Tennessee
