= Randy Tyree =

American politician (1940–2025)

Mayor of Knoxville, Tennessee
- In office 1976–1983
- Preceded by: Kyle Testerman
- Succeeded by: Kyle Testerman

Personal details
- Born: 1940 Gordonsville, Tennessee, U.S.
- Died: November 2025 (aged 85)

Randell Tyree (1940 – November 24, 2025) was an American politician, who served as mayor of Knoxville, Tennessee, from 1976 to 1983. He was also the Democratic candidate for Governor of Tennessee in 1982.

== Life and career ==
Tyree was born in Gordonsville, Tennessee, in 1940. He received a bachelor's degree from Middle Tennessee State University, where his major was political science. Subsequently he earned a law degree from the University of Tennessee. Tyree, later divorced, was married to the former Mary Pat Dukas. The couple had four children.

For a ten-year period early in his career, he worked in law enforcement, including a four-year stint with the Federal Bureau of Investigation (FBI) as well as a period as a police officer in Knoxville. He also served as a police commissioner in the City of Knoxville.

He was elected mayor of Knoxville at age 34 in 1975, the city's youngest candidate ever to hold that office, defeating Republican incumbent Kyle Testerman. He took office the following year. In 1979, he won re-election to a second four-year term, and presided over the city during the 1982 World's Fair.

In 1982, Tyree ran for Governor with support from Jake Butcher. He won the Democratic nomination by defeating Anna Belle Clement O'Brien in the primary election, but lost to Republican incumbent governor Lamar Alexander in the November general election.

Tyree unsuccessfully sought to again become mayor in the 1987 election.

Tyree was a candidate for sheriff of Knox County in 2006 and 2008. In the May 2006 primary, he ran as a write-in candidate, winning over 5% of the vote and thus earning a place in the August general election, which he lost to Republican incumbent Tim Hutchison. In 2008, he won the Democratic primary held in February, but lost to J.J. Jones in the August general election.

Tyree died on November 24, 2025, at the age of 85.

Party political offices
Preceded by Jake Butcher	Democratic nominee for Governor of Tennessee; 1982	Succeeded by Ned McWherter
Political offices
Preceded by Kyle Testerman	Mayor of Knoxville, Tennessee; 1976–1983	Succeeded by Kyle Testerman
