= 1978 Tennessee gubernatorial election =

- November 7, 1978
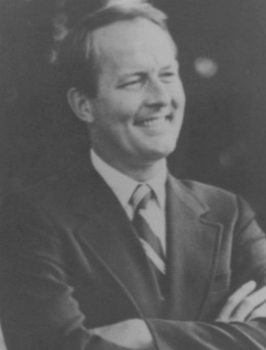

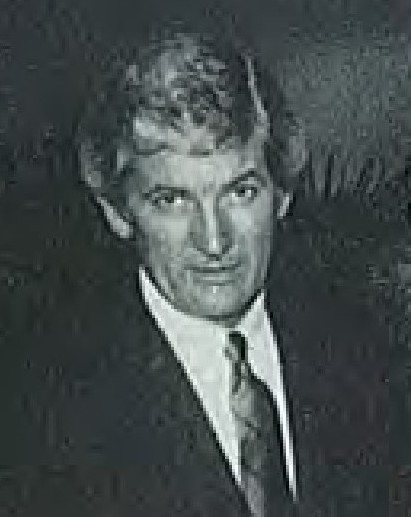
| Nominee | Lamar Alexander | Jake Butcher |
| Party | Republican | Democratic |
| Popular vote | 661,959 | 523,495 |
| Percentage | 55.84% | 44.16% |
- County results Alexander: 50–60% 60–70% 70–80% Butcher: 50–60% 60–70%
Governor before election
Ray Blanton
Democratic
Elected Governor
Lamar Alexander
Republican

The 1978 Tennessee gubernatorial election was held on November 7, 1978, to elect the next governor of Tennessee. Although the Tennessee State Constitution had been amended in early 1978 to allow a governor to succeed himself, Incumbent Democratic governor Ray Blanton chose not to seek re-election amid several scandals. Republican Lamar Alexander once again ran for governor. In the general election, Alexander defeated Democratic nominee Jake Butcher with 55.8% of the vote.

== Blanton Scandals ==
Ray Blanton's administration faced accusations of excessive spending, patronage, and corruption. His aides billed the state for personal expenses, his family’s company received a state contract, and officials in his administration were implicated in a surplus car scandal.

In 1977, he dismissed parole board chair Marie Ragghianti after she resisted pressured releases; the FBI later raided the capitol and made arrests. Near the end of his term in January 1979, Blanton issued 52 controversial pardons, including for convicted murderers, prompting legislative leaders to swear in Governor-elect Lamar Alexander early to stop further damage.

Blanton was later convicted of mail fraud, conspiracy, and extortion for selling liquor licenses, serving 22 months in federal prison. Decades later, investigators linked his administration to the 1979 murder of businessman Samuel Pettyjohn, who had been cooperating with the FBI.

In June 2021, Tennessee officials linked the 1979 murder of Chattanooga businessman Samuel Pettyjohn, who was working with the FBI, to the Blanton administration.

== Background ==
Republican Lamar Alexander once again ran for governor, and made a name for himself by walking from Mountain City in the far northeast of the state to Memphis in the far southwest, a distance of 1,022 miles (1,645 km), wearing a red and black flannel shirt that would become something of a trademark for him.

Investigative news reports, disclosed late during the campaign, revealed that Alexander once transferred the non-profit charter of a Christian church to his Ruby Tuesday restaurant chain that he served as a director in order to sell liquor-by-the-drink in the once "dry town" of Gatlinburg, Tennessee. During the campaign, Alexander, then a Nashville attorney, vowed to place his $62,676 interest in the Ruby Tuesday restaurant chain into an untouchable trust.

== Aftermath ==
In early 1979, a furor ensued over pardons made by Governor Blanton, whose administration was already under investigation in a cash-for-clemency scandal. Since the state constitution is somewhat vague on when a governor must be sworn in, several political leaders from both parties, including Lieutenant Governor John S. Wilder and State House Speaker Ned McWherter, arranged for Lamar Alexander to be sworn in on January 17, 1979, three days earlier than the traditional inauguration day, to prevent Blanton from signing more pardons. Wilder later called the move "impeachment Tennessee-style."

In February 1979, shortly after his inauguration, Alexander created an Office of Ombudsman, which was charged with cutting government red tape. He also gave state employees a 7% raise, and replaced state prisoners working at the Governor's Mansion with a paid staff. One of Alexander's biggest accomplishments as governor was the relationship he cultivated with the Japanese corporate community, which resulted in the construction of a $660 million Nissan assembly plant in Smyrna in 1980, the largest single investment in the state's history up to the time. Alexander was also instrumental in the location of General Motors' Saturn Manufacturing Facility in Spring Hill, which began operations in 1990.

== Primary elections ==
Primary elections were held on August 3, 1978.

=== Democratic primary ===
==== Candidates ====
- Jake Butcher, businessman
- Bob Clement, Public Service Commissioner
- Richard Fulton, Mayor of Nashville
- Roger Murray
- Shelley Stiles
- Bill Jacox
- William K. Jackson
- Ben Miller

==== Results ====
Democratic primary results
| Party | Candidate | Votes | % |
|---|---|---|---|
| Democratic | Jake Butcher | 320,329 | 40.91 |
| Democratic | Bob Clement | 288,577 | 36.86 |
| Democratic | Richard Fulton | 122,101 | 15.60 |
| Democratic | Roger Murray | 40,871 | 5.22 |
| Democratic | Shelley Stiles | 6,325 | 0.81 |
| Democratic | Bill Jacox | 2,010 | 0.26 |
| Democratic | William K. Jackson | 1,365 | 0.17 |
| Democratic | Ben Miller | 1,317 | 0.17 |
| Total votes | | 782,895 | 100.00 |

=== Republican primary ===
==== Candidates ====
- Lamar Alexander, attorney and nominee for governor in 1974
- Harold Sterling, State Representative
- John H. Harper
- Hubert David Patty, perennial candidate

==== Results ====
Republican primary results
| Party | Candidate | Votes | % |
|---|---|---|---|
| Republican | Lamar Alexander | 230,922 | 85.97 |
| Republican | Harold Sterling | 34,037 | 12.67 |
| Republican | John H. Harper | 2,527 | 0.94 |
| Republican | Hubert David Patty | 1,132 | 0.42 |
| Total votes | | 268,618 | 100.00 |

== General election ==
=== Candidates ===
- Lamar Alexander, Republican
- Jake Butcher, Democratic

=== Results ===
1978 Tennessee gubernatorial election
| Party | Candidate | Votes | % | ±% |
|---|---|---|---|---|
| Republican | Lamar Alexander | 661,959 | 55.84% | +12.07% |
| Democratic | Jake Butcher | 523,495 | 44.16% | −11.28% |
| Majority | | 138,464 | | |
| Turnout | | 1,189,695 | | |
| Republican gain from Democratic | | Swing | | |

== See also ==
- 1978 United States Senate election in Tennessee
- 1978 Tennessee Proposal 1
