= Bob Clement =

American politician (born 1943)

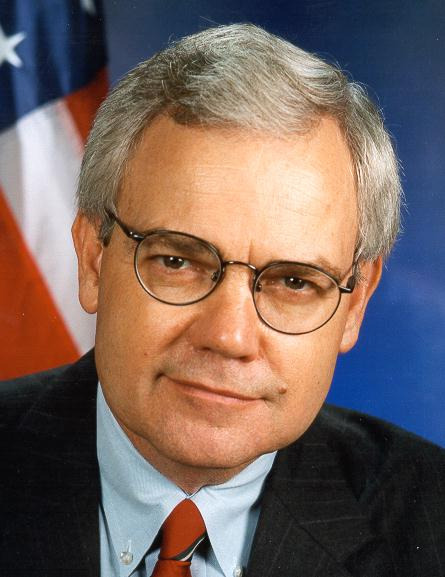

Member of the U.S. House of Representatives from Tennessee's 5th district
- In office January 19, 1988 – January 3, 2003 (Note: Clement's official service begins on the date of the special election, while he was not sworn in until January 25, 1988.)
- Preceded by: Bill Boner
- Succeeded by: Jim Cooper

President of Cumberland University
- In office 1983–1988
- Preceded by: Ernest Stockton
- Succeeded by: Walker Buckalew

Personal details
- Born: Robert Nelson Clement; September 23, 1943 (age 82) Nashville, Tennessee, U.S.
- Party: Democratic
- Spouse: Mary Carson
- Children: 2
- Relatives: Frank G. Clement (father)
- Education: University of Tennessee (BS); University of Memphis (MBA)

Military service
- Allegiance: United States
- Branch/service: National Guard
- Years of service: 1969–1971 (active); 1971–2001 (reserve)
- Rank: Colonel

Robert Nelson Clement (born September 23, 1943) is an American politician and academic administrator. A member of the Democratic Party, he served as a member of the United States House of Representatives for Tennessee's 5th congressional district from 1988 until 2003.

The son of Tennessee Governor Frank G. Clement, Clement had served on the board of directors at the Tennessee Valley Authority (TVA) and as president of Cumberland University before entering Congress. Earlier in his career, he was a member of the Tennessee Public Service Commission. Clement retired from the House to mount an unsuccessful candidacy for the United States Senate in 2002.

== Early life and education ==
Clement is the son of former Tennessee Governor Frank G. Clement. During his father's third run for governor in 1962, he joined his father on the campaign trail, often making speeches when his father developed throat trouble.

Clement graduated from Hillsboro High School in Nashville. He went on to attend the University of Tennessee graduating in 1967. He served in the National Guard from 1969 to 1971 and also served in the reserves until 2001, retiring as a colonel.

== Early career ==
=== Tennessee Public Service Commission ===
Clement considered buying a telephone company while he was studying at the University of Tennessee, but his father would not lend him the money. He gained knowledge about the Tennessee Public Service Commission, which was tasked with regulating phone companies and other utilities. Clement then became interested in working for the commission's staff.

In 1972, Clement ran against Hammond Fowler in the Democratic primary for the incumbent's seat and won. He won by a 3 to 1 margin which was the most lopsided defeat of a statewide incumbent in Tennessee history. He went on to win against Republican nominee Tom Garland in the general election in what was otherwise largely a good year for Republican candidates in Tennessee. (No Republican was ever elected to the Public Service Commission in the state during its existence which later played a factor in its abolition in 1996. At 29 he was (and still is) the youngest person ever elected to statewide office in Tennessee history.

=== Gubernatorial candidacy and TVA board membership ===
In 1978, Clement ran for the Democratic nomination for governor. He ran second in the primary narrowly behind Knoxville banker Jake Butcher, who had finished second in the Democratic gubernatorial primary four years previously.

In 1979, President Jimmy Carter tapped him for an unexpired term on the Board of Directors of the Tennessee Valley Authority (TVA). He tried to stop the overbuilding of nuclear reactors in the TVA service area, later telling The (Nashville) Tennessean that the agency was trying to pay for the projects by raising rates when there was plenty of power available. He stepped down in 1981.

== Congressional career ==
In 1982, Clement announced his candidacy for the 7th Congressional District, his family's home district. The seat was being vacated by five-term incumbent Republican Robin Beard, who was leaving it to run against Senator Jim Sasser, and had been renumbered from the 6th in redistricting. Clement won the Democratic nomination, but lost the general election to Don Sundquist, a businessman from Memphis who would later become a two-term governor. It was the first (and as of the 2010 elections, only) time that a Democrat had come within single digits in the 7th District and its predecessors since it fell into Republican hands in 1972. Clement said years later that he'd made a mistake by trying to run the same kind of campaign that his father had in his glory days.

Temporarily out of politics, Clement remained active in Democratic circles. He also had a large network of contacts through his ongoing service in the National Guard. In 1983, Clement became president of Cumberland University, a struggling private junior college in Lebanon, 30 miles (50 kilometers) east of Nashville. Cumberland had once been one of the most prestigious universities in the South, but had fallen upon hard times, never fully recovering from the Great Depression and the widespread availability of lower-cost public higher education after World War II. The nadir probably occurred when it was forced, for financial reasons, to sell its once-renowned law school (which Clement's father had attended) to what is now Samford University in Birmingham and downgrade to a junior college. During Clement's tenure, the school regained four-year college status, and shortly later, full university status. He also tripled the school's private donations.

In 1987, 5th District Congressman Bill Boner left his House seat to become mayor of Nashville. Clement, who had moved to Nashville by this time, resigned as president of Cumberland on August 22 to run in the Democratic primary for the balance of Boner's term. He won the nomination over a crowded field, including most prominently Phil Bredesen, future mayor of Nashville and two-term governor of Tennessee, who finished second. As the Republicans had long since lost interest in a seat they hadn't won since 1875 (Democrats have faced only token opposition since 1972), Clement's victory in the special election of January 19, 1988 was a foregone conclusion. He took office that night, as soon as the results were certified. He was unopposed for a full term in November even as George H. W. Bush became only the second Republican to carry Nashville in a presidential election. He was reelected six times with no substantial opposition.

Despite representing one of the most Democratic districts in the country, Clement had a reputation for working across party lines. This nonpartisan style dated back to his first campaign for the Public Service Commission.

On October 10, 2002, Bob Clement was among the 81 House Democrats who voted in favor of authorizing the invasion of Iraq.

== 2002 U.S. Senate bid ==
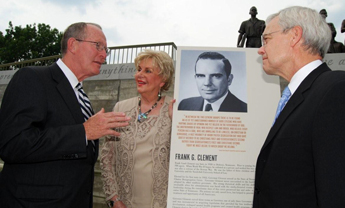
Sen. Lamar Alexander (far left), former Tennessee State Senator Anna Belle Clement O'Brien and former U.S. Representative Bob Clement discuss Gov. Frank G. Clement's role in the desegregation of Clinton High School during a ceremony at the Green McAdoo site in Clinton.

In 2002, when Republican Senator Fred Thompson stated that he had changed his mind regarding his previous announcement that he would run for a second full term, Clement entered the Democratic primary for Thompson's seat. He won the nomination easily, but was defeated in the November general election by former governor Lamar Alexander. Clement was succeeded in the House by former Congressman Jim Cooper, who is also a son of a former Tennessee governor.

== Post-congressional career ==
Clement received the Distinguished Service Award from the American Public Transit Association in 2023. Clements run a Nashville-based firm, Clement & Associates, that consults on policy issues related to energy, health, and education.

=== 2006 mayoral candidacy ===
On February 15, 2006, Clement formed an exploratory committee for a possible run for mayor of Metropolitan Nashville/Davidson County in 2007. His supporters launched a campaign website well before his official announcement. Clement finished second in a crowded field including five major candidates, where the top three candidates finished only a few hundred votes apart. Clement faced former Metropolitan Nashville/Davidson County law department director Karl Dean in a runoff election on September 11, 2007.

Clement lost the election to Dean by a 52% (51,946) to 48% (47,347) margin. Clement stated after the results were tallied that he had no plans to run for public office in the future.

== Personal life ==
Clement is married to the former Mary Carson of Nashville. They have two children and Clement has two stepchildren.

Clement currently works as a realtor in Nashville and serves on the board of directors of the Clement Railroad Hotel Museum in Dickson, Tennessee. The museum is dedicated to the history of Dickson County, Tennessee as well as the life and legacy of Clement’s father, Governor Frank G. Clement, who was born in the museum (back when it was the Hotel Halbrook) on June 2, 1920.

== See also ==
U.S. House of Representatives
Preceded by Bill Boner	Member of the U.S. House of Representatives from Tennessee's 5th congressional district 1988–2003	Succeeded by Jim Cooper
Party political offices
Preceded by Houston Gordon	Democratic nominee for U.S. Senator from Tennessee (Class 2); 2002	Succeeded by Bob Tuke
U.S. order of precedence (ceremonial)
Preceded by Ron Lewis as Former U.S. Representative	Order of precedence of the United States as Former U.S. Representative	Succeeded by Larry Bucshon as Former U.S. Representative
