= Hickman Ewing =

American attorney

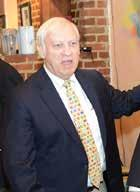

United States Attorney for the Western District of Tennessee
- In office 1981–1991
- President: Ronald Reagan; George H. W. Bush
- Preceded by: Michael Cody
- Succeeded by: Ed Bryant

Personal details
- Party: Republican
- Education: Vanderbilt University (BA); University of Memphis (JD)

Military service
- Allegiance: United States of America
- Branch/service: United States Navy
- Years of service: 1964–1969

W. Hickman Ewing Jr. is an American attorney. Ewing served as the United States Attorney for the western district of Tennessee from 1981 to 1991. He later served as the special prosecutor overseeing the Whitewater investigation.

== Early life ==
Ewing is the son of Addie Carolyn (Young) Ewing and William Hickman Ewing, Sr., a longtime high school football coach and the court clerk of Shelby County, Tennessee, who served time in the 1960s for embezzlement. Ewing attended Whitehaven High School in Memphis, Tennessee, and graduated in 1960. After graduation, he enrolled in Vanderbilt University and then served as an officer in the United States Navy. During the Vietnam War, Ewing was deployed on Swift Boats in Cam Ranh Bay. After returning from Vietnam, Ewing earned his J.D. degree from Memphis State University law school. Ewing then worked for the US attorney's office as a clerk. Ewing was eventually promoted to a prosecutor and worked on a series of cases against public officials involved in moonshine production.

== US Attorney ==
In 1981, Ronald Reagan nominated Ewing to serve as the United States Attorney for the western district of Tennessee. In 1991, Ewing was removed from the position by George H. W. Bush.

== James Earl Ray mock trial ==
In 1993, Ewing was the prosecutor in a mock trial of James Earl Ray, who pled guilty to assassination of Martin Luther King Jr., but later claimed that he was innocent and only accepted the plea bargain to avoid the death penalty. The mock trial was televised on HBO.

== Whitewater special prosecutor ==
Ewing was the special prosecutor who oversaw the Whitewater investigation of president Bill Clinton and his former associates at the Rose Law Firm. During a deposition, Ewing was reported to have made a point of avoiding a handshake with Clinton. White House communications director Sidney Blumenthal described Ewing as "a religious fanatic who operates on a presumption of guilt."
