= Anna Belle Clement O'Brien =

American politician (1923–2009)

Anna Belle Clement O'Brien in August 2008.

Anna Belle Clement O'Brien (May 6, 1923 – August 31, 2009) was a Tennessee politician, nicknamed "the first lady of Tennessee politics." She served as the governor's chief of staff from 1963 to 1967, was a member of the Tennessee House of Representatives in the 89th General Assembly, from 1975 to 1977, and a Tennessee State Senator in the 90th to 99th General Assemblies, from 1977 to 1996. While she was not the first woman ever to be in the Tennessee Senate, she was the first woman ever to be a chairman of a committee (as enacted in her tenure). Senator Mildred Jolly Lashlee was Chair of the Public Utilities Committee 1945-1947 which was absorbed into Energy & Natural Resources Committee during Senator O'Brien's tenure. During her 22 years in the General Assembly, she was the chairperson for three committees: Education, Transportation, and the Democratic Caucus.

== Personal life ==
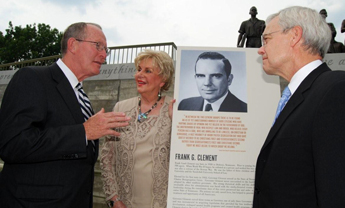
Anna Belle Clement O'Brien with U.S. Senator Lamar Alexander (left) and her nephew Bob Clement (right), flanking a poster image of her brother Frank G. Clement, at the Green McAdoo School in Clinton, Tennessee, in August 2008.

Anna Belle Clement was the daughter of Dickson, Tennessee attorney and mayor Robert S. Clement and Maybelle Goad Clement. Her brother, Frank G. Clement, was governor of Tennessee from 1953 to 1959 and again from 1963 to 1967. During his second governorship she served as his chief of staff.

She married twice. Her first marriage was to A. W. Lucas, who served as mayor of New Johnsonville, Tennessee. In 1966 she married Charles H. O'Brien, who was a Tennessee State Senator at the time of their marriage and who later became Chief Justice of the Tennessee Supreme Court. They had been married 40 years at the time of his death in January 2007.

== Career in elective politics ==
Anna Belle and Charles O'Brien made their home in Crossville, which area Anna Belle represented in the General Assembly, winning her first election in 1974. Her campaign slogan when she ran for the State Senate in 1976 was: "A woman's place is in the House … and the Senate too!"

In 1982 she was a candidate for the Democratic Party nomination for governor, but lost in the primary to Knoxville mayor Randy Tyree, who lost in the general election to Republican governor Lamar Alexander.

In the 1980s, O'Brien was diagnosed with breast cancer, underwent a mastectomy, and received a silicone implant. Subsequently, she worked to enact legislation to require health insurers to provide coverage for mammograms and later cosponsored a bill to expand women's rights to sue over defective breast implants by extending the statute of limitations for product liability lawsuits for implants.

== Death ==
O'Brien died August 31, 2009, at the University of Tennessee Medical Center in Knoxville after suffering a fall two weeks earlier at her home in Crossville.

== See also ==
- Frank Gorrell
- Van Hilleary
- Jake Butcher
- Jim Henry
