= Charles H. O'Brien =

American judge (1920–2007)

Charles Herbert O'Brien (July 30, 1920 – January 18, 2007), was a Tennessee State Senator in the 83rd and 84th Tennessee General Assemblies, a justice of the Tennessee Court of Criminal Appeals (elected in 1970) and Tennessee Supreme Court (1987–1994), and the husband of well-known Tennessee Democratic politician Anna Belle Clement O'Brien, who was the sister of the Tennessee Governor Frank G. Clement and served as her brother's chief of staff and as a state senator.

== Biography ==
O'Brien was born July 30, 1920, in Orange, New Jersey, the son of Herbert Rogers O'Brien and Agnes Montanya O'Brien. He served in the United States Army during World War II and the Korean War. He attended Cumberland Law School, graduating in 1947, and practiced law in Memphis, Tennessee from 1948 to 1967 and in Crossville, Tennessee from 1967 to 1970. He was elected to the state legislature as a representative from Memphis in 1960. In 1970 he was elected to the Court of Criminal Appeals, where he served until 1987 when he was appointed to the state Supreme Court by Governor Ned Ray McWherter. He served on that court for seven years, retiring in 1994. Earlier that year he had become chief justice.

O'Brien married Anna Belle Clement in 1966. They remained married at the time of his death in 2007. He died in Crossville from complications of diabetes. He had a son and two daughters by a previous marriage; his daughters, Diane Solomon and Heather O'Brien survived him.
