= Lamar Alexander =

American politician (born 1940)

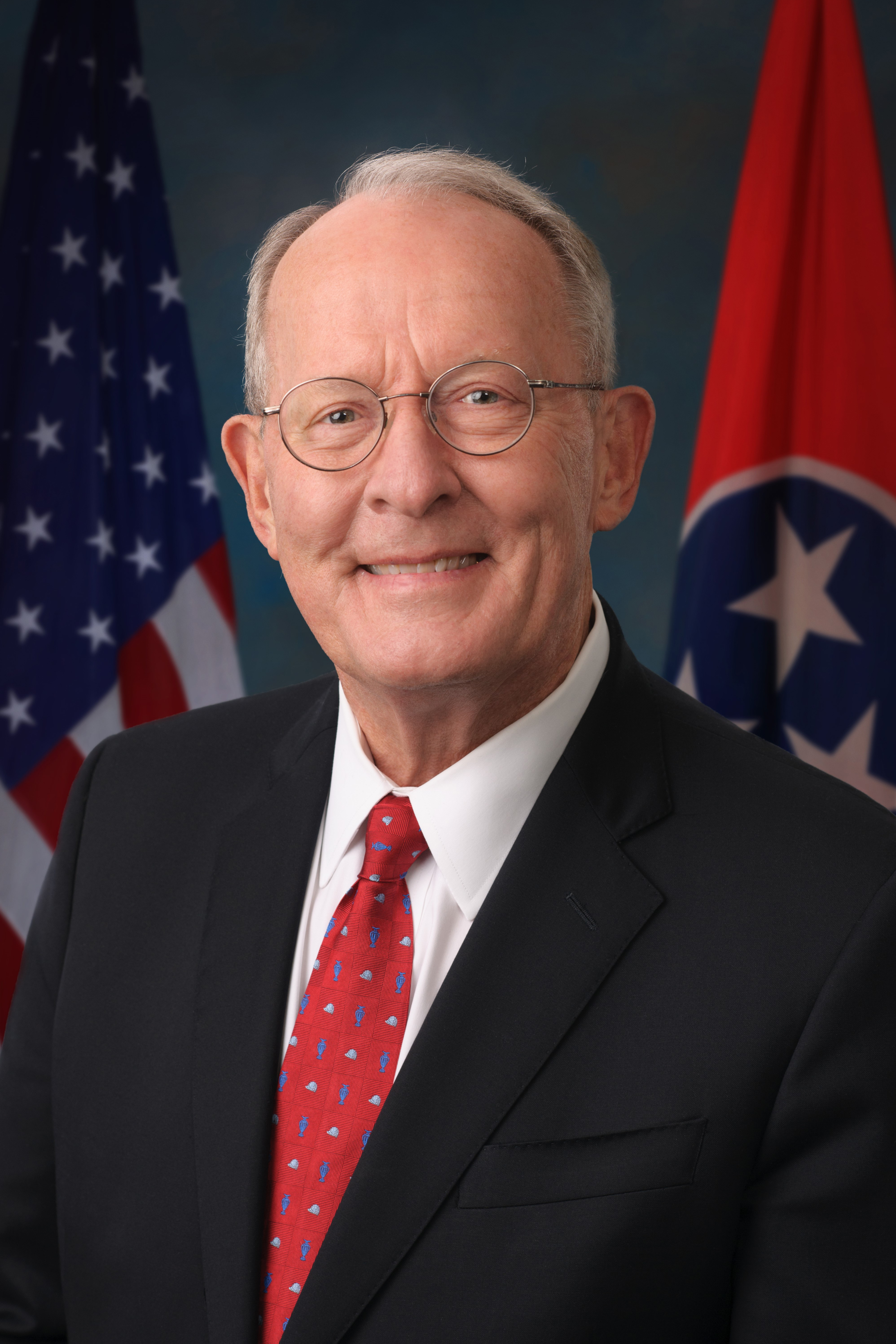
- Official portrait, 2017

United States Senator from Tennessee
- In office January 3, 2003 – January 3, 2021
- Preceded by: Fred Thompson
- Succeeded by: Bill Hagerty
Senate positions
Chair of the Senate Health Committee
In office January 3, 2015 – January 3, 2021
| Preceded by | Tom Harkin |
| Succeeded by | Patty Murray |
Ranking Member of the Senate Health Committee
In office January 3, 2013 – January 3, 2015
| Preceded by | Mike Enzi |
| Succeeded by | Patty Murray |
Chair of the Senate Republican Conference
In office December 19, 2007 – January 26, 2012
| Leader | Mitch McConnell |
| Preceded by | Jon Kyl |
| Succeeded by | John Thune |

5th United States Secretary of Education
- In office March 22, 1991 – January 20, 1993
- President: George H. W. Bush
- Deputy: David T. Kearns
- Preceded by: Lauro Cavazos
- Succeeded by: Richard Riley

Chair of the National Governors Association
- In office August 6, 1985 – August 26, 1986
- Preceded by: John W. Carlin
- Succeeded by: Bill Clinton

45th Governor of Tennessee
- In office January 17, 1979 – January 17, 1987
- Lieutenant: John Wilder
- Preceded by: Ray Blanton
- Succeeded by: Ned McWherter

2nd President of the University of Tennessee System
- In office 1988–1991
- Preceded by: Edward J. Boling
- Succeeded by: Joseph Johnson

Personal details
- Born: Andrew Lamar Alexander Jr. July 3, 1940 (age 86) Maryville, Tennessee, U.S.
- Party: Republican
- Spouse: Leslee Buhler (m. 1969; died 2022)
- Children: 4
- Education: Vanderbilt University (BA); New York University (JD)
- Alexander's voice Alexander honoring former Senator Howard Baker. Recorded July 8, 2014

Andrew Lamar Alexander Jr. (born July 3, 1940) is an American politician, academic administrator, and attorney who served as a U.S. senator from Tennessee from 2003 to 2021. A member of the Republican Party, he was previously the 45th governor of Tennessee from 1979 to 1987 and the 5th United States Secretary of Education under President George H. W. Bush, serving from 1991 to 1993. During his tenure at the Department of Education, he supported the implementation of the "America 2000" education reform initiative.

Born in Maryville, Tennessee, Alexander graduated from Vanderbilt University and the New York University School of Law. After establishing a legal career in Nashville, Tennessee, Alexander ran for Governor of Tennessee in 1974, but was defeated by Democrat Ray Blanton. Alexander ran for governor again in 1978, and this time defeated his Democratic opponent, Jake Butcher. He won re-election in 1982 and served as chairman of the National Governors Association from 1985 to 1986.

Alexander served as the president of the University of Tennessee from 1988 until 1991, when he accepted an appointment as Secretary of Education under President George H. W. Bush. Alexander sought the presidential nomination in the 1996 Republican primaries, but withdrew before the Super Tuesday primaries. He sought the nomination again in the 2000 Republican primaries, but dropped out after a poor showing in the Iowa Straw Poll.

In 2002, Alexander was elected to succeed retiring U.S. Senator Fred Thompson. Alexander defeated Congressman Ed Bryant in the Republican primary and Democratic Congressman Bob Clement in the general election. He served as Chairman of the Senate Republican Conference from 2007 to 2012 and as chairman of the Senate Health, Education, Labor and Pensions Committee from 2015 to 2021. He introduced the Every Student Succeeds Act, which supplanted the No Child Left Behind Act in 2015. On December 17, 2018, Alexander announced that he would not run for a fourth term in the Senate in 2020.

Since the passing of Jim Sasser in 2024, Alexander is the oldest surviving U.S. Senator from Tennessee.

== Early life and education ==
Alexander was born and raised in Maryville, Tennessee, the son of Genevra Floreine (née Rankin), a preschool teacher, and Andrew Lamar Alexander, a high school principal. His family is of Scotch-Irish descent. He attended Maryville High School, where he was class president, and was elected governor of Tennessee Boys State.

In 1962, Alexander graduated Phi Beta Kappa from Vanderbilt University with a Bachelor of Arts degree in Latin American studies. He was a member of Sigma Chi. Alexander was the editor of The Vanderbilt Hustler, the primary student newspaper on campus, and he advocated for the open admission of African Americans. At Vanderbilt, he was a member of the track and field team. In 1965, he obtained his Juris Doctor from the New York University School of Law.

== Career ==
=== Early political career ===
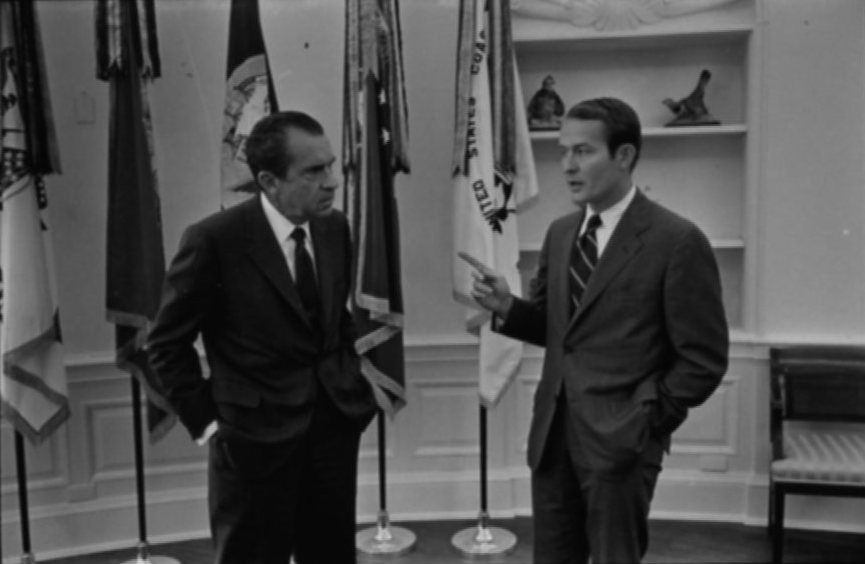
Alexander with President Richard Nixon in 1970

After graduating from law school, Alexander clerked for United States Court of Appeals for the Fifth Circuit Judge John Minor Wisdom in New Orleans, Louisiana, from 1965 to 1966.

In 1967, Alexander worked as a legislative assistant for Senator Howard Baker. While a staffer, he was briefly roommates with future U.S. Senate Majority Leader Trent Lott, and met his future wife at a staffer softball game. In 1969, he worked for Bryce Harlow, President Richard Nixon's executive assistant. In 1970, he moved back to Tennessee, serving as campaign manager for Memphis dentist Winfield Dunn's successful gubernatorial bid. Dunn was the first Republican in 50 years to win the governorship. After this campaign, Alexander co-founded and worked as a partner in the Nashville law firm of Dearborn and Ewing. Meanwhile, Alexander rented a garage apartment to Thomas W. Beasley, a student at the Vanderbilt Law School who later co-founded Corrections Corporation of America.

The Tennessee State Constitution at the time prevented governors from serving consecutive terms, so with Dunn unable to run, Alexander sought the party's nomination for governor in 1974. He defeated his two chief opponents, Commissioner of Mental Health Nat T. Winston, Jr., and Southwestern Company president Dortch Oldham, 120,773 votes to 90,980 and 35,683, respectively. He faced the Democratic nominee, Ray Blanton, a former congressman and unsuccessful 1972 Senate candidate, in the general election. Blanton attacked Alexander for his service under Nixon, who had resigned in disgrace several months earlier as a result of the Watergate scandal, and defeated Alexander on election day, 576,833 votes to 455,467.

After the 1974 campaign, Alexander returned to the practice of law. In 1974, TIME Magazine named Alexander one of the 200 Faces of the Future. In 1977, Alexander once again worked in Baker's Washington office following Baker's election as Senate Minority Leader.

=== Governor of Tennessee ===
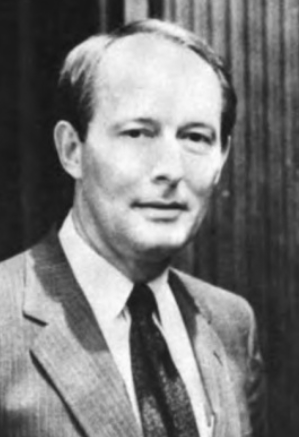
Alexander as governor.

Although the Tennessee State Constitution had been amended in early 1978 to allow a governor to succeed himself, Blanton chose not to seek re-election, due to a number of scandals. Alexander once again ran for governor, and made a name for himself by walking from Mountain City in the far northeast of the state to Memphis in the far southwest, a distance of 1,022 miles (1,645 km), wearing a red and black flannel shirt that would become something of a trademark for him.

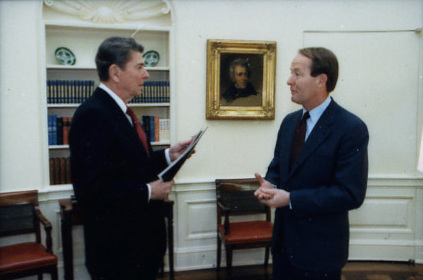
Alexander with President Ronald Reagan in 1986

Investigative news reports, disclosed late during the 1978 Tennessee gubernatorial campaign, revealed that Alexander once transferred the non-profit charter of a Christian church to his Ruby Tuesday restaurant chain that he served as a director in order to sell liquor-by-the-drink in the once "dry town" of Gatlinburg, Tennessee. During the campaign, Alexander, then a Nashville attorney, vowed to place his $62,676 interest in the Ruby Tuesday restaurant chain into an untouchable trust.

After winning the Republican nomination with nearly 86% of the vote, he defeated Knoxville banker Jake Butcher in the November 1978 election, 665,847 votes to 523,013.

In early 1979, a furor ensued over pardons made by Governor Blanton, whose administration was already under investigation in a cash-for-clemency scandal. Since the state constitution is somewhat vague on when a governor must be sworn in, several political leaders from both parties, including Lieutenant Governor John S. Wilder and State House Speaker Ned McWherter, arranged for Alexander to be sworn in on January 17, 1979, three days earlier than the traditional inauguration day, to prevent Blanton from signing more pardons. Wilder later called the move "impeachment Tennessee-style."

In February 1979, shortly after his inauguration, Alexander created an Office of Ombudsman, which was charged with cutting government red tape. He also gave state employees a 7% raise, and replaced state prisoners working at the Governor's Mansion with a paid staff. One of Alexander's biggest accomplishments as governor was the relationship he cultivated with the Japanese corporate community, which resulted in the construction of a $660 million assembly plant for Nissan vehicles in Smyrna in 1980, the largest single investment in the state's history up to the time. Alexander was also instrumental in the location of General Motors' Saturn Manufacturing Facility in Spring Hill, which began operations in 1990.

In 1982 Alexander took advantage of the 1978 constitutional amendment allowing governors to serve a second consecutive four-year term. He ran again and defeated Knoxville mayor Randy Tyree, 737,963 votes to 500,937. During his second term, he served as chairman of the National Governors Association from 1985 to 1986, and was chair of the President's Commission on American Outdoors, 1985 to 1986. He also oversaw the "Tennessee Homecoming" in 1986, in which local communities launched numerous projects that focused on state and local heritage.

In 1983, Alexander implemented his "Better Schools" program, which standardized basic skills for all students, and increased math, science and computer education. A portion of this plan, known as "Master Teachers," or "Career Ladder," called for income supplements for the state's top teachers. Due to staunch opposition from the Tennessee Education Association, which derided the plan's method of teacher evaluations, the bill initially died in the state legislature. Later that year, Alexander convinced House Speaker Ned McWherter to support an amended version of the bill, which passed. In 1984, the Tennessee Chairs of Excellence Trust Fund was authorized to allow private donor contributions to be matched by the state, creating endowed chairs that would raise the level of higher education and attract faculty.

In 1986, Alexander proposed the "Better Roads Program" to fund a backlog of needed highway projects. The project increased the state's gasoline tax by three cents, and funded fifteen priority projects and six Interstate-type projects, including Interstate 840, the outer southern beltway around Nashville; and the eastern extension of the Pellissippi Parkway near Knoxville, now signed as Interstate 140. A similar initiative based on the Better Roads Program, the "IMPROVE Act", was signed by Governor Bill Haslam in 2017.

After opting out of the 1984 US Senate contest for the open seat of retiring Majority Leader Howard Baker, Alexander was constitutionally ineligible for a third term and stepped down from the governorship on January 17, 1987. He was succeeded by Ned McWherter.

=== President of the University of Tennessee ===
Alexander along with his family moved to Australia for a short time in the late 1980s. While there he wrote a book titled Six Months Off. Upon returning to Tennessee, he served as president of the University of Tennessee from 1988 to 1991.

=== United States Secretary of Education ===
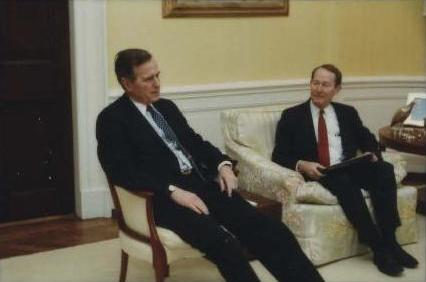
Alexander with President George H. W. Bush in 1991

Alexander served as the United States Secretary of Education from 1991 to 1993. As Education Secretary, he sparked controversy after he approved Transnational Association of Christian Colleges and Schools (TRACS) to accredit schools despite an advisory panel that repeatedly recommended against it in 1991 and 1987.

In 1993, Steve Levicoff published a book-length critical discussion of TRACS and Alexander's decision in When The TRACS Stop Short.

Former Department of Education employee and writer Lisa Schiffren has stated that, "His fortune is founded on sweetheart deals not available to the general public, and a series of cozy sinecures provided by local businessmen. Such deals are not illegal..." Schiffren further notes that, in 1987, Alexander, along with Bob Keeshan (best known as TV's Captain Kangaroo), helped found Corporate Child Care Management, Inc. (later known as Corporate Family Solutions), a company that – via a merger to become Bright Horizons Family Solutions Inc. – is now the nation's largest provider of worksite day care. While businessman Jack C. Massey spent $2 million on this enterprise, Alexander co-founded the company with only $5,000 of stock which increased in value to $800,000, a 15,900 percent return within four years. Also in 1987, he wrote a never-cashed investment check for $10,000 to Christopher Whittle for shares in Whittle Communications that increased in value to $330,000. In 1991, Alexander's house, which he had recently purchased for $570,000, was sold to Whittle for $977,500. Alexander's wife obtained an $133,000 profit from her $8,900 investment in a company created to privatize prisons. Alexander frequently shifted assets to his wife's name, yet such transfers are not legal under federal ethics and security laws. In his 2005 U.S. Senate financial disclosure report, he listed personal ownership of BFAM (Bright Horizons Family Solutions) stock valued (at that time) between $1 million and $5 million. He taught about the American character as a faculty member at Harvard Kennedy School.

=== United States presidential bids ===
Alexander made two unsuccessful runs for President of the United States, in 1996 and 2000. In 1996, he finished third in the Iowa caucuses and the New Hampshire primary, and dropped out before the Super Tuesday primaries. After dropping out of the race, Alexander took on an advisory role in the Dole/Kemp campaign. In 2000, during his second candidacy, he traveled around the US in a Ford Explorer, eschewing a campaign bus or plane. That journey lasted less than six months, from the announcement of Alexander's candidacy on March 9, 1999, to his withdrawal on August 16, 1999, after a poor showing in the Ames Straw Poll. He ended both of his presidential campaigns in Nashville, Tennessee.

=== U.S. Senate ===
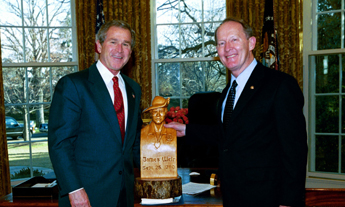
Alexander with President George W. Bush in 2004

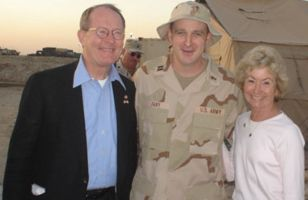
Senator and Mrs. Alexander with the Presbyterian Chaplain of the 844th from Rhea County in 2005

==== Elections ====
===== 2002 =====
Despite vowing not to return to elected office, Alexander was nevertheless persuaded by the White House to run for the open seat of retiring Senator Fred Thompson in 2002. Seen as a moderate Republican by Tennessee standards, Alexander’s candidacy was vigorously opposed by conservatives, who instead supported US Representative and House manager during the 1998 impeachment of Bill Clinton, Ed Bryant.

Alexander was better-funded and armed with more prominent endorsements, however, and edged Bryant in the primary, 295,052 votes to 233,678. Democrats had high hopes of retaking the seat that they lost in 1994 with their candidate, US Representative Bob Clement, a member of a prominent political family. However, Clement's campaign never really caught on, and Alexander defeated him in the general election with 54 percent of the vote. With his election to the US Senate, he became the first Tennessean to be popularly elected both governor and senator. At the age of 62, Alexander also became the oldest elected freshman US senator from Tennessee since Democrat Lawrence D. Tyson in 1924, which he held until 2018 when Marsha Blackburn surpassed him at the age of 66.

===== 2008 =====
In April 2007, Alexander announced he would run for re-election to the Senate in 2008.

Alexander was favored throughout the entire campaign, due to his long history in Tennessee politics and a disorganized Democratic opposition. His rivals were former state Democratic Party Chairman Bob Tuke, who won a heated primary, and Libertarian candidate Daniel T. Lewis.

Alexander won reelection, taking 65 percent of the vote to Tuke's 32 percent. Alexander also carried all but one of Tennessee's 95 counties; he lost only in Haywood County in western Tennessee, which was secured by Tuke. He won the normally Democratic strongholds of Davidson and Shelby counties—home to Nashville and Memphis, respectively. Alexander also benefited from riding the coattails of John McCain, who won the state with a solid majority.

===== 2014 =====
In December 2012, Alexander announced he would be seeking re-election to a third Senate term in 2014. Alexander's campaign had a war chest of $3.1 million in cash going into his 2014 re-election bid.

In an August 2013 letter to Alexander signed by over 20 Tennessee Tea Party groups, the groups called on Alexander to retire from the Senate in 2014, or face a primary challenge. The letter stated: "During your tenure in the Senate we have no doubt that you voted in a way which you felt was appropriate. Unfortunately, our great nation can no longer afford compromise and bipartisanship, two traits for which you have become famous. America faces serious challenges and needs policymakers who will defend conservative values, not work with those who are actively undermining those values."

Although Alexander was initially thought to be vulnerable to a primary challenge from the right, he worked to avoid this and ultimately did not face a high-profile challenger. He declared his intention to run early, quickly won the endorsement of Governor Bill Haslam, every living former Tennessee Republican Party chair person, and the state's entire Republican congressional delegation, except for then scandal-hit Scott DesJarlais. He also raised a large amount of money and worked to avoid the mistakes of ousted Senators Bob Bennett and Richard Lugar by trying to stay in touch with his constituents, especially in East Tennessee. Moreover, out-of-state conservative organizations such as the Senate Conservatives Fund made little effort to defeat Alexander.

Alexander won the Republican primary, defeating State Representative and Tea Party challenger Joe Carr. However, Alexander recorded the lowest winning percentage (49.7%) and lowest margin of victory (9.2 points) ever in a primary for a Republican U.S. senator from Tennessee. Carr won a larger percentage of the vote (40.5%) than the previous 11 challengers to sitting Republican U.S. senators in Tennessee history combined (40.3%). Alexander won the general election with 62% of the vote.

==== Tenure ====
In 2006, a newly discovered species of springtail found in Great Smoky Mountains National Park was named Cosberella lamaralexanderi in Alexander's honor, because of his support of scientific research funding in the park and because the springtails' patterning is reminiscent of the plaid shirts Alexander typically wears while campaigning.

On October 6, 2018, Alexander was one of 50 senators (49 Republicans, 1 Democrat) who voted to confirm Brett Kavanaugh to the Supreme Court.

===== Republican leadership =====
In late 2006, Alexander announced that he had secured the requisite number of votes to become the Republican Party's Minority Whip in the Senate during the 110th Congress. Even though he was seen as the preferred choice of Minority Leader Mitch McConnell and the Bush administration, he lost the election to former Senate Majority Leader Trent Lott by one vote (25–24).

Alexander would get a second shot at entering his party's leadership a year later when Lott announced his intent to resign from the Senate by the end of 2007. Sen. Jon Kyl of Arizona, then Chairman of the Senate Republican Conference, ran for Whip and was elected without opposition. With the Conference Chair vacant, Alexander announced that he would seek the position. He would go on to defeat Sen. Richard Burr of North Carolina by a margin of 31–16.

Alexander stepped down as Conference Chairman in January 2012, citing his desire to foster consensus. He said, "I want to do more to make the Senate a more effective institution so that it can deal better with serious issues." He added, "For these same reasons, I do not plan to seek a leadership position in the next Congress", ending speculation that he would run for the position of Republican Whip after Jon Kyl retired in 2013.

On December 17, 2018, Alexander announced that he would not seek another term in 2020. In an interview with Politico, he stated that he had made the decision as early as August 2018.

For his tenure as the chairman of the Senate Health, Education, Labor, and Pensions Committee in the 116th Congress, Alexander earned an "F" grade from the non-partisan Lugar Center's Congressional Oversight Hearing Index.

===== 2013 presidential inauguration role =====
As co-chairman of the Joint Congressional Inaugural Committee, Alexander was one of the speakers at the Second inauguration of Barack Obama on January 21, 2013, alongside the committee's chair, Senator Chuck Schumer.

===== Committee assignments =====
- Committee on Appropriations
  - Subcommittee on Commerce, Justice, Science, and Related Agencies
  - Subcommittee on Defense
  - Subcommittee on Energy and Water Development (chairman)
  - Subcommittee on Interior, Environment, and Related Agencies
  - Subcommittee on Labor, Health and Human Services, Education, and Related Agencies
  - Subcommittee on Transportation, Housing and Urban Development, and Related Agencies
- Committee on Energy and Natural Resources
  - Subcommittee on Energy
  - Subcommittee on National Parks
  - Subcommittee on Public Lands, Forests and Mining
- Committee on Health, Education, Labor, and Pensions (chairman)
  - Subcommittee on Children and Families (Ex Officio)
  - Subcommittee on Employment and Workplace Safety (Ex Officio)
  - Subcommittee on Primary Health and Aging (Ex Officio)
- Committee on Rules and Administration

===== Caucus memberships =====
- International Conservation Caucus
- Sportsmen's Caucus
- Tennessee Valley Authority Caucus (Co-chair)

===== Legislation sponsored =====
The following is an incomplete list of legislation that Alexander introduced in the Senate.

- PREEMIE Reauthorization Act (S. 252; 113th Congress) – a bill that would reauthorize research programs on preterm births that are run by the Centers for Disease Control and Prevention. It would also authorize grants and demonstration programs to be run by the Health Resources and Services Administration that will try to decrease preterm births. It passed the Senate on September 25, 2013.
- Exchange Information Disclosure Act – a bill that would require the government to report on the number of visitors and enrollees on the federal government's healthcare exchanges, as well as what level of insurance coverage people buy on the exchanges. The bill would apply only to the federally run healthcare exchanges, which cover 36 states, not the state-run exchanges, according to Ripon Advance. On January 16, 2014, the U.S. House passed the bill. Its companion bill Exchange Information Disclosure Act (H.R. 3362; 113th Congress) was introduced in the House by Rep. Lee Terry (R, NE-2).

== Political positions ==
=== Iraq ===
Before the Iraq War began, Alexander supported sending troops to Iraq and expressed his agreement with President Bush that Iraq must be dealt with immediately. A year after the war began, Alexander stated that the Iraq War had provided "lessons" to the nation, but went on to say that American troops should not be withdrawn, saying "It would be even worse if we left before the job was done." In 2007, Alexander touted implementing the Iraq Study Group recommendations, noting that he believes Bush will be viewed as a Truman-esque figure if he implements the Group's recommendations.

=== Health care reform ===
On July 15, 2009, Alexander voted against President Obama's health care reform bill in the Senate Health, Education, Labor and Pensions Committee. Alexander stated that he opposed the bill because, he said, it would result in higher state taxes, an increased federal debt, government-run health care, and Medicare cuts; he instead supported a different approach to reform. Alexander voted against the Affordable Care Act in December 2009, and he voted against the Health Care and Education Reconciliation Act of 2010. Alexander was part of the group of 13 senators who drafted the Senate version of the failed American Health Care Act of 2017 behind closed doors.

=== Bipartisanship ===
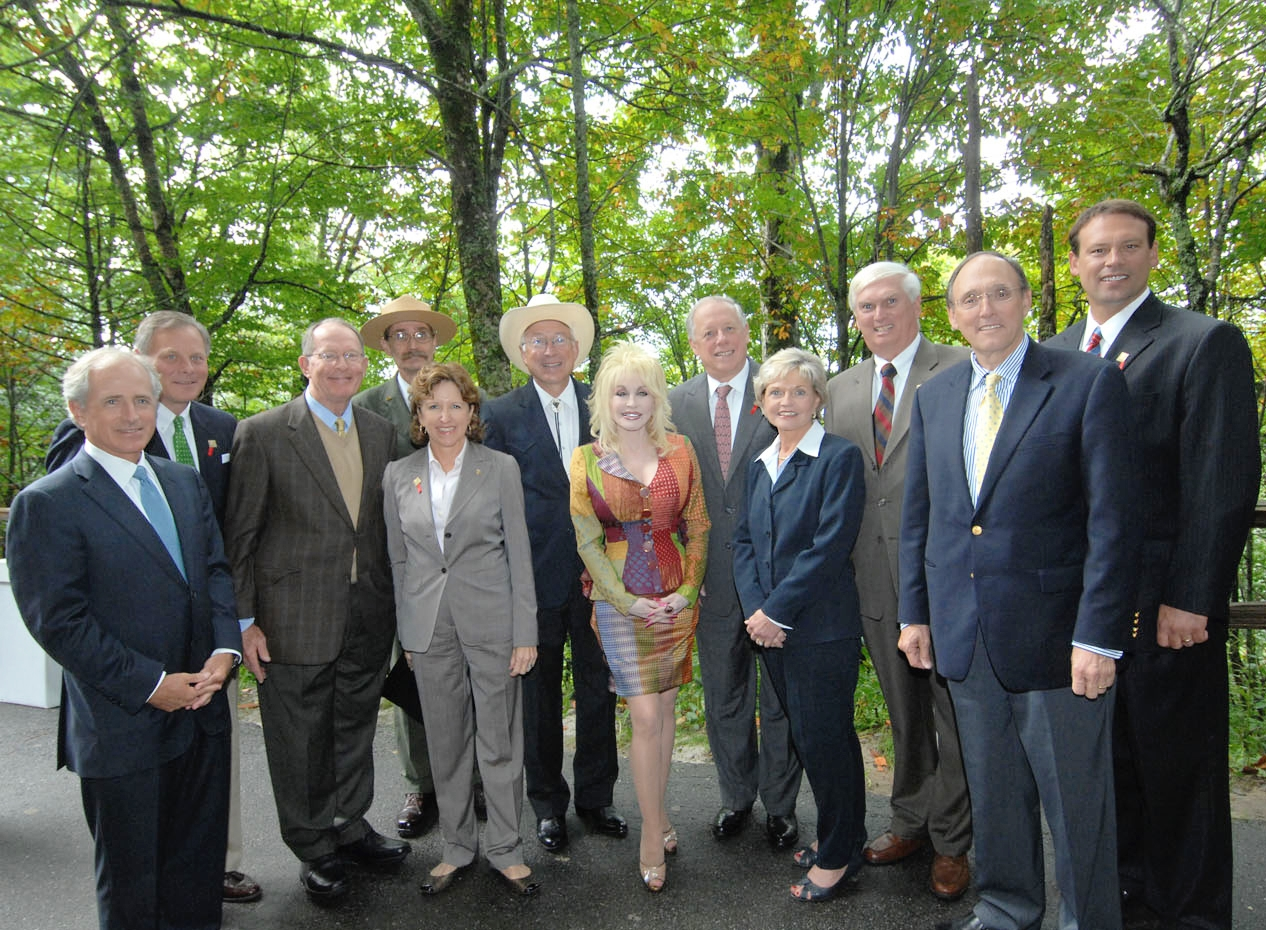
Lamar Alexander with U.S. Senators Bob Corker, Kay Hagan, & Richard Burr, Congressmen John Duncan, Phil Roe, & Heath Shuler, Governor Phil Bredesen, and Dolly Parton at the Great Smoky Mountains National Park in 2009

According to the 2009 annual vote studies by Congressional Quarterly, Alexander was one of the most bipartisan Republican members of the Senate. According to National Journal's 2009 Vote Ratings, he was ranked as the 32nd most conservative member in the Senate.

Alexander broke ranks with conservative Senate Republicans when he announced his support for the nomination of Supreme Court nominee Sonia Sotomayor.

Alexander, along with Senator Mark Warner (D-Virginia) and Representatives Tom Petri (R-Wisconsin) and David Price (D-North Carolina), requested that the American Academy of Arts and Sciences form The Commission on the Humanities and Social Sciences, which was convened in 2010.

=== Gun laws ===
In April 2013, Alexander was one of 46 senators to vote against the passing of a bill which would have expanded background checks for all gun buyers. Alexander voted with 40 Republicans and 5 Democrats to stop the bill.

=== National security ===
Alexander critiqued President Donald Trump's 2017 executive order to temporarily curtail immigration from 7 Muslim-majority countries that were claimed to have increased terrorism risk until better screening methods were devised. He stated that the executive order was "inconsistent with our American character."

=== Saudi Arabia ===
In March 2018, Alexander voted to table a resolution spearheaded by Bernie Sanders, Chris Murphy, and Mike Lee that would have required President Trump to withdraw American troops either in or influencing Yemen within the next 30 days unless they were combating Al-Qaeda.

=== Energy and environment ===
Alexander has voiced support for nuclear power on multiple occasions, and is a critic of wind power, believing wind turbines to be eyesores and dangerous to threatened bird populations. After the release of former Vice President Al Gore's global warming film An Inconvenient Truth in 2006, Alexander criticized the omission of nuclear power in the film as a suggestion for mitigating climate change. He stated "Maybe it needs a sequel: 'An Inconvenient Truth 2: Nuclear Power.'" Alexander also stated that "Because [Gore] was a former vice president and presidential nominee, he brings a lot of visibility to [the issue]. On the other hand it may be seen as political by some, and they may be less eager to be a part of it."

Alexander opposed the proposed Green New Deal, saying that it is not the proper solution to climate change and calling it "an assault on cars, cows, and combustion," and in response proposed what he calls the "New Manhattan Project for Clean Energy" (named after the World War II-era Manhattan Project, which developed the first atomic bomb). The proposed plan contains ten major points of developing advanced nuclear power, more efficient natural gas, carbon capture, more efficient batteries, more efficient buildings, more electric vehicles, cheaper solar power, fusion power, advanced computing, and doubled funding for the Department of Energy's Office of Science. Alexander proposed a similar plan by the same name in 2008.

=== Trade ===
In November 2018, Alexander was one of twelve Republican senators to sign a letter to President Trump requesting the United States–Mexico–Canada Agreement (USMCA) be submitted to Congress by the end of the month to allow a vote on it before the end of the year, as they were concerned "passage of the USMCA as negotiated will become significantly more difficult" if having to be approved through the incoming 116th United States Congress.

=== Judiciary ===
In March 2016, around seven months before the next presidential election, Alexander declared his opposition to the Senate considering President Obama's nominee to the Supreme Court. Alexander said: "I believe it is reasonable to give the American people a voice by allowing the next president to fill this lifetime appointment to the Supreme Court." In September 2020, with less than two months to the next presidential election, Alexander supported an immediate vote on President Trump's nominee to fill the Supreme Court vacancy caused by the death of justice Ruth Bader Ginsburg. Alexander declared that "even during a presidential election year", "no one should be surprised that a Republican Senate majority would vote on a Republican president’s Supreme Court nomination".

=== Impeachment of Donald Trump ===
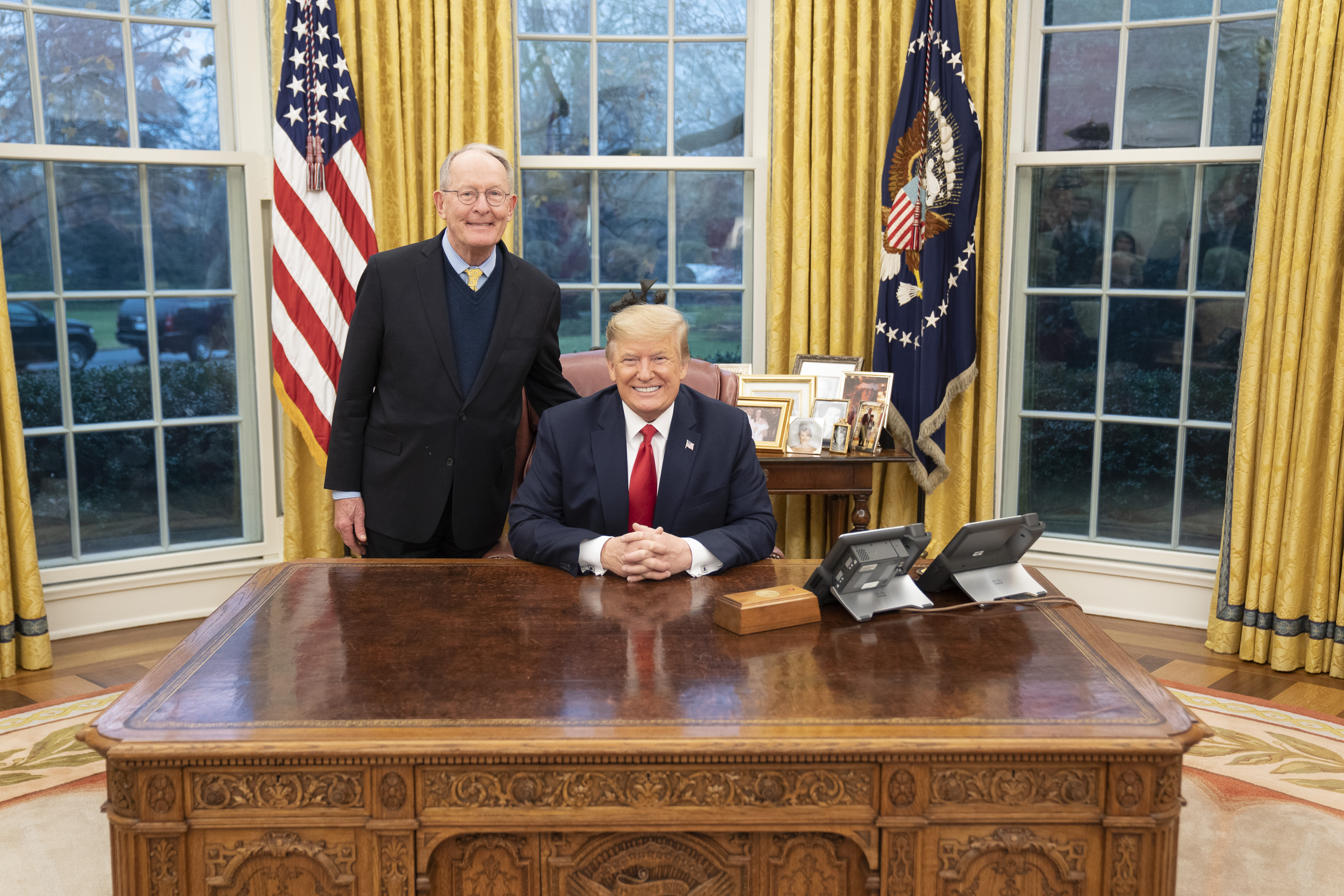
Alexander with President Donald Trump in 2019

In the first impeachment trial of Donald Trump, Alexander was seen as a key swing voter in the bid to allow witness testimony in the trial. Near midnight on January 30, he said that he would vote against witnesses in the trial. The New York Times wrote that Alexander "played a crucial role in short-circuiting the first impeachment trial of President Trump" by opposing calling witnesses.

On January 31, Alexander voted against considering any motion to subpoena witnesses or documents. Alexander additionally voted for tabling four amendments: an amendment to subpoena John Bolton, Mick Mulvaney, OMB employee Michael Duffey, and White House aide Robert Blair over the Ukraine scandal, an amendment to subpoena Bolton regarding the Ukraine scandal, an amendment to have Bolton give oral deposition and to testify before the Senate, and an amendment to have the chief justice of the United States, John Roberts, to decide motions from any senator or party to subpoena relevant witnesses and documents that have relevance to the Impeachment articles. Alexander voted for a Senate resolution to the trial that passed, which concluded the witness testimony portion of the trial and moved to closing statements.

In a 2026 memoir, Alexander said that Trump's role in the January 6th U.S. Capitol attack were impeachable and amounted to "high crime or misdemeanor". However, at the time, Alexander, who had just left office, refused to opine on Trump's second impeachment. In the memoir, Alexander called on Republicans to stand up to Trump.

== Personal life ==
In 1969, Alexander married Leslee "Honey" Buhler, who grew up in Victoria, Texas, and graduated from Smith College in Massachusetts. They had met during a softball game for Senate staff members. Together they have four children: Drew, Leslee, Kathryn, and Will. Drew died in 2021. After a six-month trip to Australia with his family in the late 1980s, Alexander wrote about their adventure in a book entitled Six Months Off.

Alexander is a classical and country pianist. He began taking piano lessons at age three, and won several competitions as a child. In April 2007, he played piano on singer Patti Page's re-recording of her 1950 hit "Tennessee Waltz". He appeared on the record at the invitation of record executive Mike Curb. Alexander and Page performed the song live at an April 4 fundraiser for his senatorial re-election campaign in Nashville's Schermerhorn Symphony Center. While clerking for Judge Wisdom, he also played trombone, tuba and washboard at a Bourbon Street nightclub.

Alexander is a member of Sons of the Revolution. He is a member and elder of Westminster Presbyterian Church in Nashville, a congregation of the Presbyterian Church (USA).

Alexander is an Eagle Scout, and used his Scouting experience in the Senate, sponsoring a 2010 resolution recognizing February 8, as "Boy Scouts of America Day."

== Electoral history ==
Tennessee US Senate election, 2014
| Party | Candidate | Votes | % | ±% |
|---|---|---|---|---|
| Republican | Lamar Alexander | 849,748 | 61.9 | |
| Democratic | Gordon Ball | 437,175 | 31.8 | |

Tennessee US Senate Republican primary election, 2014
| Party | Candidate | Votes | % |
| Republican | Lamar Alexander | 331,705 | 49.7 |
| Republican | Joe Carr | 271,324 | 40.6 |
| Republican | George Shea Flinn | 34,668 | 5.2 |
| Republican | Christian Agnew | 11,320 | 1.7 |
| Republican | Brenda Lenard | 7,908 | 1.2 |
| Republican | John King | 7,748 | 1.2 |
| Republican | Erin Kent Magee | 3,366 | 0.5 |

Tennessee US Senate election, 2008
| Party | Candidate | Votes | % | ±% |
|---|---|---|---|---|
| Republican | Lamar Alexander | 1,571,637 | 67.3 | +13.0 |
| Democratic | Bob Tuke | 762,779 | 32.6 | |

Tennessee US Senate election, 2002
| Party | Candidate | Votes | % | ±% |
|---|---|---|---|---|
| Republican | Lamar Alexander | 888,223 | 54.3 | |
| Democratic | Bob Clement | 726,510 | 44.2 | |

Tennessee US Senate Republican primary election, 2002
| Party | Candidate | Votes | % |
| Republican | Lamar Alexander | 295,052 | 53.8 |
| Republican | Ed Bryant | 233,678 | 42.6 |
| Republican | Mary Taylor-Shelby | 5,589 | 1.0 |
| Republican | June Griffin | 4,930 | 0.9 |
| Republican | Michael Brent Todd | 4,002 | 0.7 |
| Republican | James DuBose | 3,572 | 0.7 |
| Republican | Christopher Fenner | 1,552 | 0.3 |
| Republican | Write-ins | 102 | 0.0 |

Tennessee gubernatorial election, 1982
| Party | Candidate | Votes | % | ±% |
|---|---|---|---|---|
| Republican | Lamar Alexander | 737,693 | 59.56 | +3.72 |
| Democratic | Randy Tyree | 500,937 | 40.44 | |

Tennessee gubernatorial election, 1978
| Party | Candidate | Votes | % | ±% |
|---|---|---|---|---|
| Republican | Lamar Alexander | 661,959 | 55.84 | |
| Democratic | Jake Butcher | 523,495 | 44.16 | |

Tennessee gubernatorial election, 1974
| Party | Candidate | Votes | % | ±% |
|---|---|---|---|---|
| Democratic | Ray Blanton | 576,833 | 55.88 | |
| Republican | Lamar Alexander | 455,467 | 44.12 | |

1996 United States presidential election (Republican primaries):

- Bob Dole – 9,024,742 (58.82%)
- Pat Buchanan – 3,184,943 (20.76%)
- Steve Forbes – 1,751,187 (11.41%)
- Lamar Alexander – 495,590 (3.23%)
- Alan Keyes – 471,716 (3.08%)
- Richard Lugar – 127,111 (0.83%)
- Unpledged delegates – 123,278 (0.80%)
- Phil Gramm – 71,456 (0.47%)
- Bob Dornan – 42,140 (0.28%)
- Morry Taylor – 21,180 (0.14%)

Republican Senate Minority Whip

- Trent Lott (MS) – 25 (51.02%)
- Lamar Alexander (TN) – 24 (48.98%)

Senate Republican Conference Chairman

- Lamar Alexander (TN) – 31 (65.96%)
- Richard Burr (NC) – 16 (34.04%)

== See also ==
- Lobbying in the United States

Party political offices
| Preceded by Winfield Dunn | Republican nominee for Governor of Tennessee; 1974, 1978, 1982 | Succeeded by Winfield Dunn |
| Preceded by Fred Thompson | Republican nominee for U.S. Senator from Tennessee (Class 2); 2002, 2008, 2014 | Succeeded by Bill Hagerty |
| Preceded by Jon Kyl | Chair of the Senate Republican Conference; 2007–2012 | Succeeded by John Thune |
Political offices
| Preceded by Ray Blanton | Governor of Tennessee; 1979–1987 | Succeeded by Ned McWherter |
| Preceded by John Carlin | Chair of the National Governors Association; 1985–1986 | Succeeded by Bill Clinton |
| Preceded by Lauro Cavazos | United States Secretary of Education; 1991–1993 | Succeeded by Richard Riley |
Academic offices
| Preceded by Edward Boling | President of the University of Tennessee System; 1988–1991 | Succeeded by Joe Johnson |
U.S. Senate
| Preceded by Fred Thompson | U.S. Senator (Class 2) from Tennessee; 2003–2021; Served alongside: Bill Frist, Bob Corker, Marsha Blackburn | Succeeded by Bill Hagerty |
| Preceded by Bob Bennett | Ranking Member of the Senate Rules Committee; 2011–2013 | Succeeded by Pat Roberts |
| Preceded by Mike Enzi | Ranking Member of the Senate Health Committee; 2013–2015 | Succeeded by Patty Murray |
| Preceded by Tom Harkin | Chair of the Senate Health Committee; 2015–2021 | Succeeded by Patty Murray |
U.S. order of precedence (ceremonial)
| Preceded by Lynn Morley Martin as Former U.S. Cabinet Member | Order of precedence of the United States as Former U.S. Cabinet Member | Succeeded by William Barr as Former U.S. Cabinet Member |
