= David M. Pack =

Former Attorney general of Tennessee

Pack in 1964

David Massey Pack (November 4, 1921 – June 29, 1996) was an American lawyer and public official who served as the Attorney General and Reporter of Tennessee from 1969 to 1974. Before his appointment as attorney general, Pack held multiple cabinet-level posts in state government, including Commissioner of Highways and Public Works and Commissioner of Insurance and Banking. During his tenure as attorney general he represented the state before the Tennessee Supreme Court in significant criminal and civil matters, and he later sought the Democratic nomination for governor in 1974.

Born in Sevierville, Tennessee, Pack was educated in the local schools. From 1942 to 1946, he served three and a half years in the United States Army during World War II. After the war, he completed A.B. and LL.B. degrees at the University of Tennessee in 1948. Pack then built a career in public service in Nashville and was active in state legal and political affairs for decades. He died in Nashville on June 29, 1996. The Tennessee General Assembly adopted a joint resolution memorializing his life and service soon after his death.
