= Ed Bryant =

American politician (born 1948)

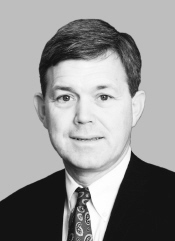

Magistrate Judge of the United States District Court for the Western District of Tennessee
- In office December 12, 2008 – February 28, 2019

Member of the U.S. House of Representatives from Tennessee's 7th district
- In office January 3, 1995 – January 3, 2003
- Preceded by: Don Sundquist
- Succeeded by: Marsha Blackburn

United States Attorney for the Western District of Tennessee
- In office 1991–1993
- President: George H. W. Bush
- Preceded by: Hickman Ewing
- Succeeded by: Veronica Coleman

Personal details
- Born: Edward Glenn Bryant; September 7, 1948 (age 77) Jackson, Tennessee, U.S.
- Party: Republican
- Education: Tennessee Technological University; University of Mississippi, Oxford (BA, JD)

Military service
- Branch/service: United States Army
- Years of service: 1970–1978
- Rank: Captain
- Unit: Army Judge Advocate General's Corps

Edward Glenn Bryant (born September 7, 1948) is an American politician who is a former Republican member of the United States House of Representatives from Tennessee (1995–2003). From 1991 to 1993, he served as the United States Attorney for the Western District of Tennessee. Bryant later served as a United States magistrate judge for the Western District of Tennessee from 2008 to 2019.

== Early life ==
Ed Bryant was born and raised in Jackson, Tennessee. His mother was a registered nurse, while his father was an electrician. Bryant attended Tennessee Technological University for a year before transferring to the University of Mississippi, where he received both his B.A. in 1970 and J.D. in 1972. As a student, he was active in the Sigma Nu fraternity. Bryant was also selected to the national leadership organization of Omicron Delta Kappa.

He received a commissioned as a 2nd Lieutenant in the United States Army through the Army Reserve Officers' Training Corps. Initially serving in the Military Intelligence Corps, Bryant was later selected to serve in the Judge Advocate General's Corps. During his time in the U.S. Army, he was assigned to the Ballistic Missile Defense System Command in Huntsville, Alabama, the 4th Infantry Division at Fort Carson in Colorado and taught constitutional law to cadets at the United States Military Academy at West Point. Bryant served another year in the Tennessee Army National Guard.

Upon returning to Jackson, Tennessee, he joined the law firm of Waldrop & Hall and was later elected President of the Madison County Bar Association.

== Entrance into politics ==
Bryant first became politically active in a high-profile way in 1988 when he served as an early organizer for the abortive presidential bid of conservative televangelist Pat Robertson. Earlier that year, Eighth District Congressman Ed Jones decided not to run for reelection. Bryant won the Republican nomination for the district, a largely Democratic area mostly in the northwestern part of the state. He lost in the general election to Union City attorney and state representative John S. Tanner. Bryant resumed the practice of law, having been appointed as United States Attorney for the Western District of Tennessee by President George H. W. Bush in 1991. He later moved to Henderson, near Jackson, located in the neighboring Seventh Congressional District.

== U.S. House of Representatives ==
When Seventh District Congressman Don Sundquist did not run for re-election in 1994 (choosing instead to wage an ultimately successful campaign for governor), Bryant won the Republican primary for the district. The 7th is one of the state's most Republican districts outside of East Tennessee. Under the circumstances, Bryant's victory in November was a foregone conclusion.

In his three subsequent re-elections, Bryant never failed to receive under 60% of the vote. His only serious opposition came in his first reelection bid, when Clarksville mayor Don Trotter faced him. Bryant defeated him by over 30 points. As of the 2016 elections, Trotter is the last reasonably well-financed Democrat to run in the 7th, and one of only three Democrats to make a serious bid for the seat since it fell into Republican hands in 1972 (when it was numbered as the 6th District; it has been the 7th since 1983). Bryant was unopposed in 1998, and was reelected by over 40 points in 2000.

Bryant established a solidly conservative record and was a darling of both business-oriented groups such as the National Federation of Independent Business and social conservative groups such as the American Conservative Union, the National Rifle Association of America, and National Right-to-Life.

=== Clinton impeachment ===
He was best known as one of the House managers (prosecutors) in the impeachment trial of President Bill Clinton. Bryant was regarded by many as one of the less strident and pompous and more personable managers. This is supposedly why Monica Lewinsky chose Bryant to be the manager to interview her about the case.

== 2002 U.S. Senate election ==
In 2002 Bryant entered the Republican primary for the United States Senate after Republican Fred Thompson announced that he was changing his mind from an earlier announcement and would not be seeking re-election. The circumstances resulted in his piecing together a hurried, underfinanced campaign. Bryant was opposed by former governor of Tennessee, U.S. Secretary of Education, and two-time presidential candidate Lamar Alexander for the Republican nomination. Alexander had both greater statewide name recognition and greater financial resources, even though he hadn't appeared on a ballot for a statewide office in Tennessee in 20 years. Despite this, Bryant held Alexander to 55% of the primary vote while garnering 44%. Additionally, Bryant made a good impression on many Republican activists in the state, especially with his willingness to make appearances on the Republican ticket's behalf during the fall campaign after his own defeat.

== 2006 U.S. Senate election ==
After Bryant's defeat in 2002, he moved to Nashville briefly, but returned to West Tennessee. There he sought the Republican nomination for the U.S. Senate seat then-held by Senate Majority Leader Bill Frist, who did not seek re-election in 2006.

Bryant faced two other major Republicans in the primary on August 3, 2006:

- Bob Corker – Former mayor of Chattanooga and 1994 Senate candidate.
- Van Hilleary – Former United States Representative and 2002 gubernatorial nominee.

In an interview with John Gibson of Fox News, Bryant stated that he did not believe Harold Ford Jr. should be considered a serious candidate for the U.S. Senate because of Ford's young age of 36 at the time.

Bryant conceded the GOP primary election to Bob Corker on August 3, 2006.

== Later career ==
On December 12, 2008, Bryant was sworn in as a United States magistrate judge for the Western District of Tennessee. He retired from this position on February 28, 2019.

Legal offices
| Preceded by Hickman Ewing | United States Attorney for the Western District of Tennessee; 1991–1993 | Succeeded by Veronica Coleman |
U.S. House of Representatives
| Preceded by Don Sundquist | Member of the U.S. House of Representatives from Tennessee's 7th congressional district 1995–2003 | Succeeded by Marsha Blackburn |
U.S. order of precedence (ceremonial)
| Preceded by Bill Boner as Former U.S. Representative | Order of precedence of the United States as Former U.S. Representative | Succeeded by Van Hilleary as Former U.S. Representative |
