= Nat T. Winston Jr. =

Nat. T. Winston Jr.
- Born: Johnson City, Tennessee, US
- Education: Vanderbilt University
- Occupations: Psychiatrist, Director, Commissioner, Author, Musician
- Years active: 1953–2013

Nat T. Winston Jr., M.D. was an American psychiatrist and healthcare pioneer, Tennessee's former commissioner of mental health, and a former candidate for Governor of Tennessee. Winston published Dear God: I Hope You Will Always Love Me and Forgive Me in 2009, a book that addresses and discusses topics in the sexual exploitation of American women. He died on 31 December 2013 in Nashville, Tennessee.

== Personal History ==
Dr. Winston, a native of Johnson City, Tennessee, was the son of Nat T. Winston and Naomi Frances Coblentz Winston. He attended undergraduate and medical school at Vanderbilt University after serving as an infantry officer in World War II. Graduating Magna Cum Laude in 1953, Dr. Winston was credited with being the first psychiatrist in Eastern Tennessee, and the first director of the Johnson City Mental Health Clinic. He was later appointed as the first superintendent of Moccasin Bend Psychiatric Hospital, where his work gained national recognition for placing Tennessee on the forefront of mental healthcare. Following these posts, he was appointed Commissioner of Mental Health for Tennessee by Gov. Frank Clement and again under Gov. Buford Ellington.

After a Republican bid for the 1974 gubernatorial seat, Dr. Winston entered the private sector founding American Psychiatric Hospitals, which later merged with Hospital Affiliates before being acquired by HCA. Dr. Winston continued in private healthcare by building and opening hospitals for sexually abused adolescents and serving as medical director for several companies and hospitals. In 2005, he was awarded the 'Beyond the Call' award for exceptional professional dedication to the Psychiatric Field and in 2006, he was presented the Dorothea Dix award for his outstanding contribution to Psychiatry. In later years he gave talks to university students regarding his experiences in the medical field—most notably at Cumberland University in Lebanon, Tennessee on April 20, 2010; an event that was sponsored by the university's prestigious Psi Chi honor society.

Dr. Winston also gained national recognition as an entertainer by playing banjo and earning a gold record for selling over one million copies of his successful 'How to Play' instructional record series. He often stated his fondness of the Appalachian culture and was considered an expert and ambassador to the history, music, and people of Appalachia by many of his colleagues.

== Johnny Cash ==
Dr. Winston was noted for his involvement in helping Johnny Cash end his addiction to amphetamines and barbiturates. According to an interview with Cash on Larry King Live, Winston told Cash "I'm a doctor, I'm a psychiatrist, and I've seen a lot of people in the shape you're in. And frankly, I don't think there is much chance for you. I've never known of anyone as far gone as you are to really whip it." Dr. Winston's interaction with Johnny Cash came at the urging of June Carter. Johnny Cash would later to go on writing music together with Dr. Winston, including "Tiger Whitehead"—a song released on Cash's 1975 album The Johnny Cash Children's Album.

== John Hastings Winston Diploma ==
In 1986, Nat Winston disclosed to his friend, Richard H. Knight Jr., of Nashville, that Winston's grandfather, John Hastings Winston Jr., a member of the Virginia Military Institute's Class of 1885, had been denied his diploma minutes after he (Hastings) had delivered the valedictorian's address during graduation ceremonies. In that address, Cadet Hastings had been critical of the faculty and administration for the harsh penalties assessed against his fellow cadets for engaging in little more than hijinks. Upon the conclusion of his valedictory address, the VMI Board of Visitors hastily convened on the reviewing stand and made a snap decision to withhold Cadet Hastings' diploma. Hastings went home empty-handed, and that is where the matter stood a century later. Knight, a member of the VMI Class of 1970 and a member of the Board of Directors of the VMI Alumni Association, advised Winston that it might be possible to restore his great-grandfather's diploma in view of the Draconian punishment and the passage of a hundred years. Knight relayed the story of Winston's great-grandfather to Gen. Sam Walker, VMI's superintendent, and to the president of the Alumni Association, along with his recommendation that the Board of Visitors convene to re-consider Cadet Hastings' case. In due course, the VMI Board of Visitors met and voted unanimously to posthumously award a diploma to Cadet Hastings, and to recognize him as the valedictorian of his class. Dr. Winston, Mrs. Winston, Mr. Knight, and the Winstons' grandson attended a presentation ceremony in the superintendent's office. The story was picked up on the AP wire, and was transmitted to news outlets throughout North America.

== Raymond Fairchild ==
Dr. Winston was also a friend and advocate of Raymond Fairchild. In early 1970 Dr. Winston had made a contact which would later bring him to the stage of the Grand Ole Opry. After having hired Raymond and the Maggie Valley Boys to play at his cabin for a party on Grandfather Mountain, Dr. Winston noted Raymond's technical prowess. A struggling banjo player himself, Winston recognized Raymond's talents and set up an informal audition backstage at the Grand Ole Opry in Roy Acuff's dressing room. While Loretta Lynn and Ernest Tubb were entertaining the Opry audience with "Sweet Thang," Raymond was playing the daylights out of "Whoa Mule" and "Orange Blossom Special" to the slack jaws of the crowd that Raymond gathered.
