= Jake Butcher =

American businessman and politician (1936-2017)

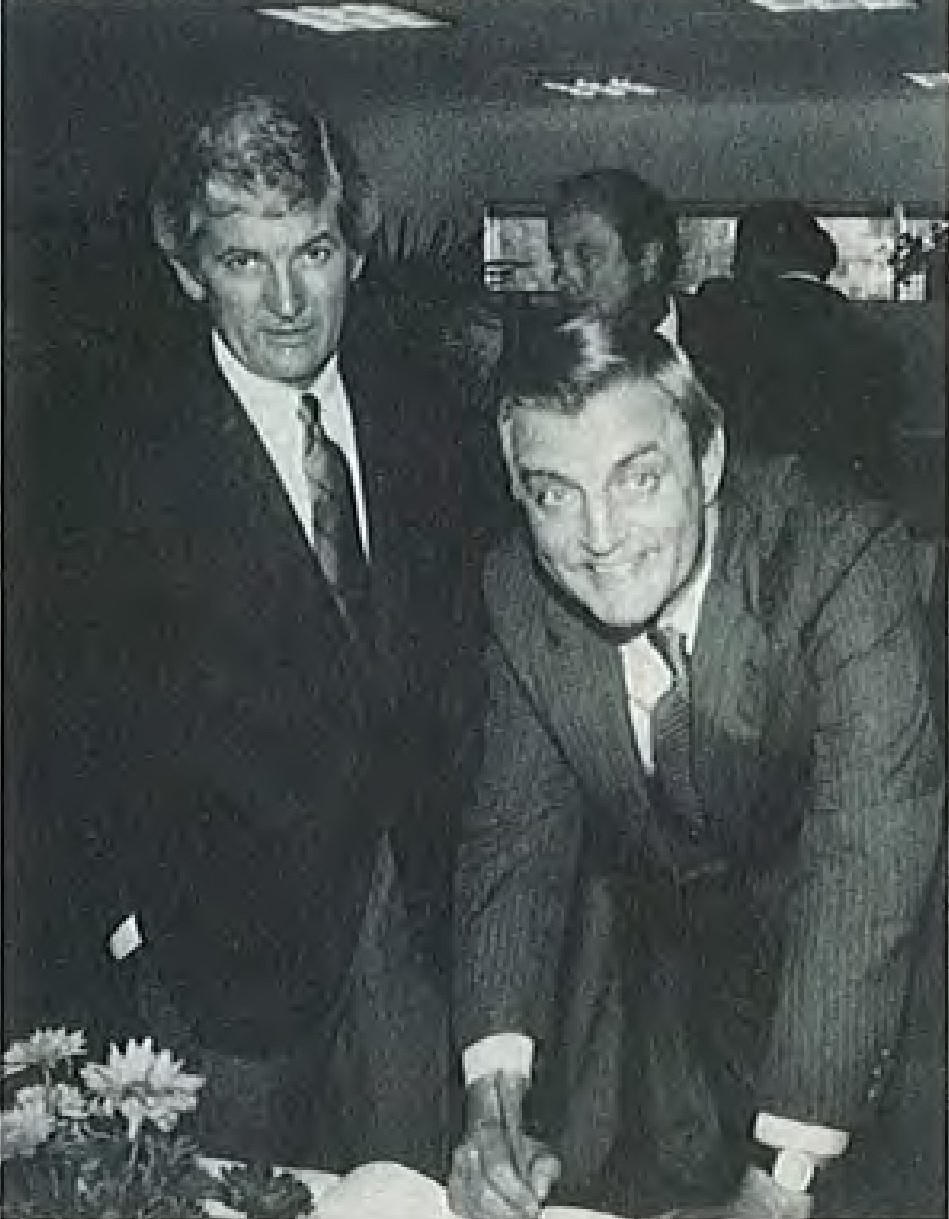
- Jake Butcher, left, with Walter Mondale, right, during the 1982 World's Fair
- Born: Jacob Franklin Butcher; May 8, 1936; Maynardville, Tennessee, U.S.
- Died: July 19, 2017 (aged 81); Atlanta, Georgia, U.S.
- Education: Horace Maynard High School
- Alma mater: University of Tennessee; Hiwassee College
- Occupations: Banker and politician
- Known for: United American Bank, bank fraud scandal, 1982 World's Fair
- Political party: Democratic
- Board member of: Greater Knoxville Chamber of Commerce, East Tennessee Heart Association, Holston Conference of the United Methodist Church
- Spouse: Sonya Wilde (m. 1962)
- Children: 4
- Parent: Cecil Hilque Butcher Sr.

Jacob Franklin Butcher (May 8, 1936 – July 19, 2017) was an American banker and politician. He built a financial empire in East Tennessee and was the Democratic Party nominee for governor of Tennessee in 1978. He was also the primary promoter of the 1982 World's Fair in Knoxville, Tennessee, and lost his business and his personal fortune after he was found to have engaged in bank fraud.

== Early life and banking career ==
Butcher was born in the rural town of Maynardville, Tennessee. His father, Cecil H. Butcher Sr., was a general store manager and bank president in Union County. After attending the University of Tennessee and Hiwassee College, Jake Butcher served in the United States Marine Corps.

Having worked at their father's bank during their youth, Butcher and his younger brother C.H. Butcher Jr. began buying stock in numerous Tennessee banks starting in 1968. By 1974, the Butcher brothers owned or controlled eight banks, and Jake Butcher's United American Bank controlled 39% of the banking reserves in Knoxville, Tennessee. By 1982, UAB was responsible for over 50% of Knoxville's business loans, and Butcher's personal net worth was declared to be about $34 million. In the late 1970s, United American Bank built its 27-story headquarters, the Plaza Tower, which remains Knoxville's tallest building. In the early 1980s, C.H. Butcher's City and County Bank began building the Riverview Tower, which remains the city's second-tallest building.

== Public life ==
By the early 1970s, Jake Butcher became a topic of discussion in Tennessee political circles. In 1974, he sought the Democratic Party nomination for governor of Tennessee, but he lost to Ray Blanton in the primary. After a bitter contest, Butcher earned the nomination in 1978, defeating former Nashville mayor Richard Fulton and newcomer Bob Clement. Butcher lost the general election later that year to Republican Lamar Alexander.

Rumors circulated that Butcher would make another run for the governorship in 1982. However, he supported Knoxville Mayor Randy Tyree, who defeated State Senator Anna Belle Clement O'Brien for the Democratic nomination. Governor Alexander won re-election handily.

During that same year, the 1982 World's Fair opened in Knoxville, which Butcher and a group of fellow Knoxville business leaders had helped to attract. The fair was considered a success and brought in more than 11 million people over its six-month run. The World's Fair site is still in use today as a municipal park in downtown Knoxville. Adjacent to the main campus of the University of Tennessee, some of the World's Fair attractions are still standing and have been rehabilitated.

== Fraud and criminal conviction ==
Rumors about Butcher's banking practices started to circulate in the early 1980s. Knoxville federal and state bank investigators had long suspected that Butcher was engaged in unlawful financial activity. On November 1, 1982, 180 federal bank regulators from the Federal Deposit Insurance Corporation simultaneously raided all of the Butcher brothers' 29 bank branches and offices, thereby preventing transfers of funds to cover their tracks. Bank records ultimately led investigators on a paper trail of illegal loans, forged documents, and various other forms of fraud.

The United American Bank collapsed on 14 February 1983. It was the fourth-largest bank failure in U.S. history up to that time. Seven other Butcher-controlled banks and the Southern Industrial Banking Corporation, a state licensed loan and thrift company run by C.H. Butcher, also became insolvent during the rest of 1983, and an additional three banks in 1984. The FDIC estimated that its losses in connection with the failed Butcher brother banks totaled approximately $382.6 million. Later that year, it was learned that Butcher was also insolvent; his assets were listed at $11.9 million and his liabilities at $32.5 million.

Butcher pleaded guilty to federal charges of bank fraud in 1985 and was given a 20-year prison term. He was paroled in 1992, and resided in the Atlanta suburb of Canton. Butcher reportedly worked for a Toyota distributor and as a real estate developer. His assets were auctioned off to satisfy his creditors.

His brother C.H. Butcher Jr., who also was sent to state prison for state securities fraud, was paroled in 1993 and died in 2002.

== Personal life and death ==
Butcher married the actress Sonya Wilde in 1962. They had four children.

Butcher died on July 19, 2017, at the age of 81.

Party political offices
Preceded by Ray Blanton	Democratic nominee for Governor of Tennessee; 1978	Succeeded by Randy Tyree
