= 1948 Tennessee gubernatorial election =

- November 2, 1948
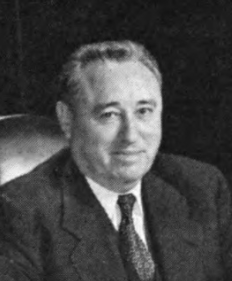

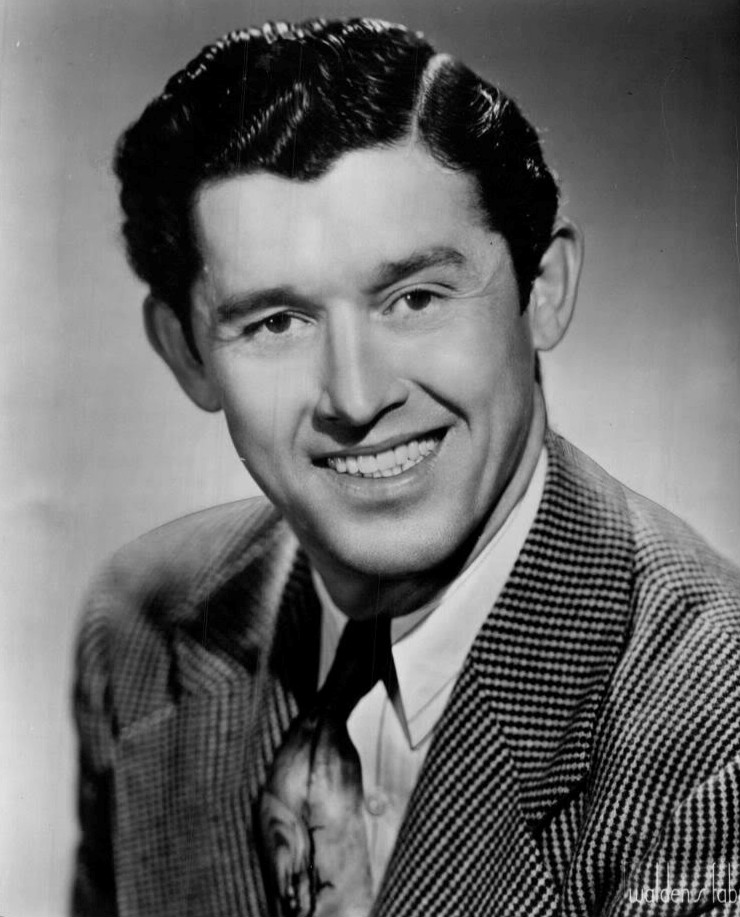
Nominee	Gordon Browning	Roy Acuff
Party	Democratic	Republican
Popular vote	363,903	179,957
Percentage	66.91%	33.09%
- County results Browning: 50–60% 60–70% 70–80% 80–90% >90% Acuff: 50–60% 60–70% 70–80%
Governor before election
Jim Nance McCord
Democratic
Elected Governor
Gordon Browning
Democratic

The 1948 Tennessee gubernatorial election was held on November 2, 1948. Former Democratic governor Gordon Browning once again sought the party's nomination for governor. In the hardly fought primary, Browning comfortably defeated Governor Jim Nance McCord. In the general election, Browning easily defeated Republican nominee Roy Acuff, a famous country musician, with 66.9% of the vote.

Before this election, Gordon Browning was last elected governor of Tennessee in 1936. He lost his re-election primary in 1938, and he failed the first time to defeat Governor McCord in 1946.

== Background and context ==
Realizing it would take a considerable effort to defeat the powerful Memphis political organization led by E. H. Crump, which had dominated Tennessee Democratic politics for decades and with whom he had previously fallen out, Gordon Browning teamed up with Congressman Estes Kefauver, who was challenging Crump's candidate, Tom Stewart, for one of the state's U.S. Senate seats. Crump ran attack ads against Browning and Kefauver, criticizing the former for issuing too many pardons as governor, and accusing the latter of being a communist sympathizer. Browning compared Crump to Adolf Hitler, and told stories about Crump sneaking through Memphis cemeteries at night to find names of dead people to add to voter lists. He also attacked Governor Jim Nance McCord for implementing a 2% state sales tax (which Crump had reluctantly supported).

As the campaign heated up, Crump's hold on state politics appeared to be weakening. Congressman Al Gore, Sr. returned from Washington to canvass for Browning. Various voting blocks began turning against Crump, among them black voters in Memphis, who had grown tired of his control of the city's political system. Returning veterans sympathized with Browning's military experience, while labor groups were angry with McCord for enacting a right-to-work law. On election day, Browning defeated McCord for the nomination, and Kefauver defeated Stewart. It was the first defeat for a Crump-backed candidate in a major election in over two decades.

In the general election, Browning faced country music singer Roy Acuff. Republicans had added Acuff's name to their primary ballot as a publicity stunt to draw attention to the party, and he unexpectedly won the nomination. Though Acuff ran a serious campaign, Browning nevertheless won easily.

During his second tenure as governor, Browning enacted several measures aimed at further weakening Crump and other political bosses, including laws requiring permanent voter registration, open election commission meetings, and metal ballot boxes in places where voting machines were not used. Browning signed legislation that partially eliminated the state's poll tax, which political bosses had used for decades to control votes.

== Primary elections ==
Primary elections were held on August 4, 1948.

=== Democratic primary ===
==== Candidates ====
- Gordon Browning, former governor
- Jim Nance McCord, incumbent governor
- James N. Hardin
- Jay Hanson

==== Results ====
Democratic primary results
Party	Candidate	Votes	%
Democratic	Gordon Browning	240,676	55.76%
Democratic	Jim Nance McCord (incumbent)	183,948	42.62%
Democratic	James N. Hardin	5,905	1.37%
Democratic	Jay Hanson	1,067	0.25%
Total votes		431,596	100.00%

== General election ==
=== Candidates ===
- Gordon Browning, Democratic
- Roy Acuff, Republican

=== Results ===
1948 Tennessee gubernatorial election
Party	Candidate	Votes	%	±%
Democratic	Gordon Browning	363,903	66.91%	
Republican	Roy Acuff	179,957	33.09%	
Majority		183,946		
Turnout		543,881		
Democratic hold		Swing		

== See also ==
- 1948 United States presidential election in Tennessee
- 1948 United States Senate election in Tennessee
