= 1948 United States Senate election in Tennessee =

- November 2, 1948
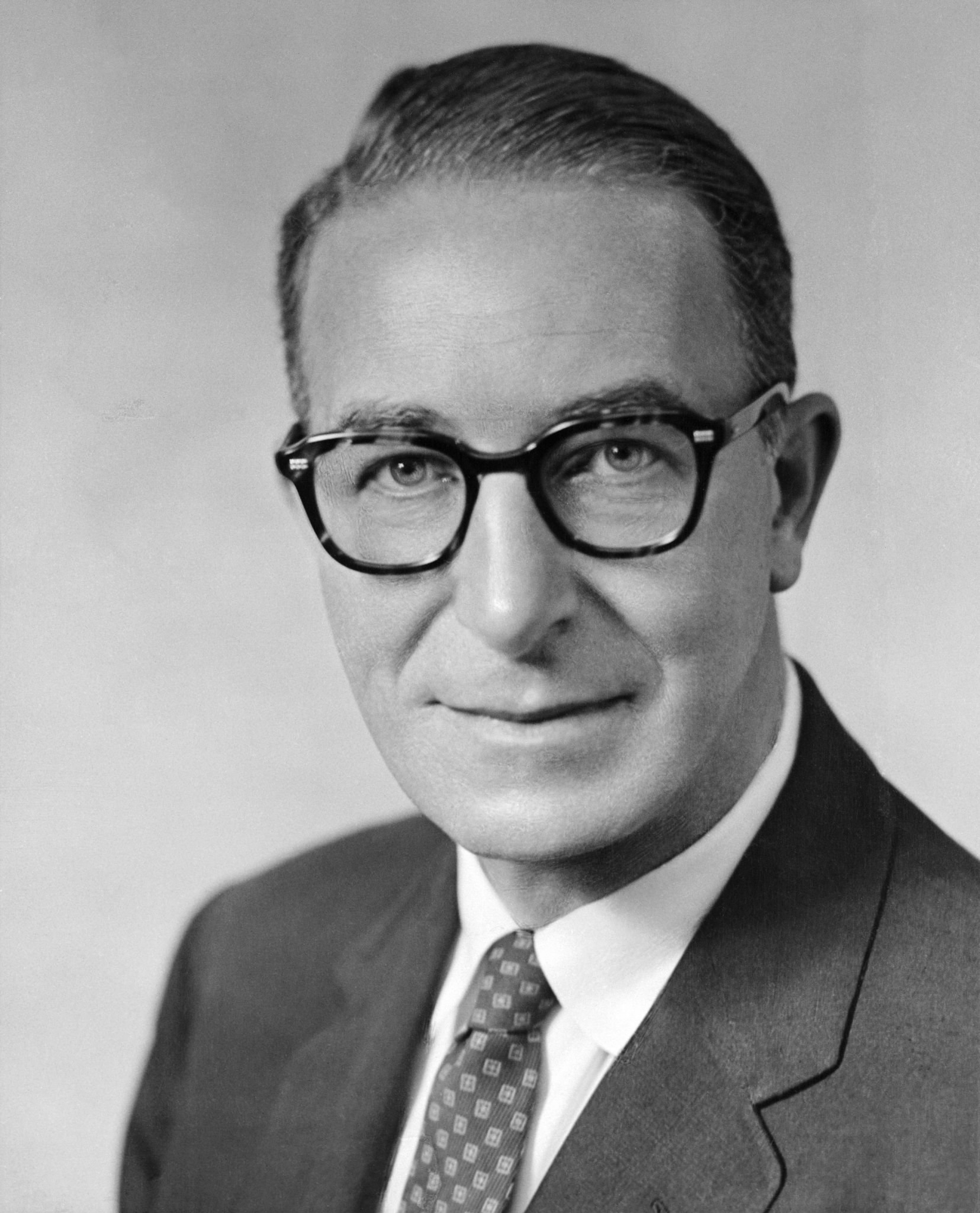

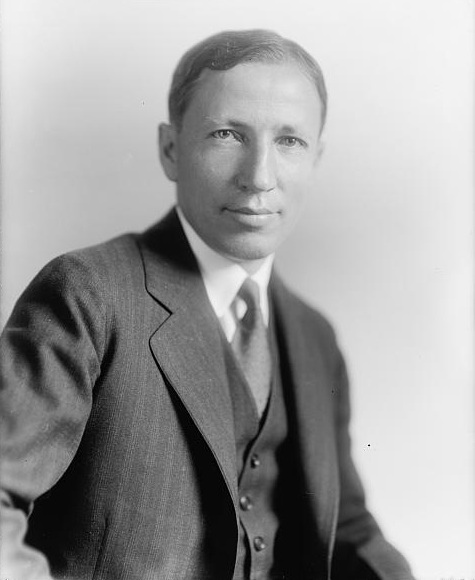
Nominee	Estes Kefauver	B. Carroll Reece
Party	Democratic	Republican
Popular vote	326,142	166,947
Percentage	65.33%	33.44%
- County results Kefauver: 40–50% 50–60% 60–70% 70–80% 80–90% >90% Reece: 40–50% 50–60% 60–70% 70–80% 80–90%
Senator before election
Tom Stewart
Democratic
Elected Senator
Estes Kefauver
Democratic

The 1948 United States Senate election in Tennessee took place on November 2, 1948, concurrently with the U.S. presidential election, as well as elections to the United States Senate in other states as well as elections to the United States House of Representatives and various state and local elections. Incumbent Democratic Senator Tom Stewart was defeated in the Democratic primary by Estes Kefauver. In the general election, Kefauver defeated Republican Congressman B. Carroll Reece.

== Background ==
For the 1948 U.S. Senate election in Tennessee, Congressman Estes Kefauver challenged the incumbent Tom Stewart, who was backed by longtime Memphis political boss Crump. Crump ran attack ads against Kefauver and his ally, Gordon Browning, who was running for governor, criticizing Browning's record as governor and accusing Kefauver of being a communist sympathizer.

Browning and Kefauver worked together to challenge Crump's influence, highlighting the weakening of his political machine. Key voting groups—including black voters in Memphis, returning veterans, and labor supporters—shifted away from Crump-backed candidates. On primary election day, Browning defeated Governor Jim Nance McCord for the Democratic nomination, while Kefauver defeated Stewart. This marked the first major statewide loss for a Crump-backed candidate in more than twenty years.

== Democratic primary ==
=== Candidates ===
- George W. Hardin
- John Hickey
- Estes Kefauver, U.S. Representative from Chattanooga
- John R. Neal, attorney, professor and perennial candidate
- John A. Mitchell, incumbent judge for the 5th Judicial Circuit
- Tom Stewart, incumbent U.S. Senator since 1938

=== Results ===
Democratic Party primary results
Party	Candidate	Votes	%
Democratic	C. Estes Kefauver	171,791	42.24%
Democratic	A. Tom Stewart (incumbent)	129,873	31.94%
Democratic	John Mitchell	96,192	23.65%
Democratic	George W. Hardin	5,415	1.33%
Democratic	John R. Neal	1,876	0.46%
Democratic	John Hickey	1,534	0.38%
Total votes		406,681	100.00%

== Republican primary ==
While B. Carroll Reece was the Chairman of the Republican National Committee (RNC), Republican leaders in Tennessee began to discuss the prospect of Reece running for the United States Senate. As Tennessee law allowed a person to qualify for a primary without candidate consent, Reece's associates entered his name into the primary. Reece stepped down from his chairmanship of the RNC after the nomination of Thomas E. Dewey at the 1948 Republican National Convention. After considering the option of running for his former position representing Tennessee's 1st congressional district, Reece instead announced his candidacy for the Republican nomination for the United States Senate. Allen J. Strawbridge, a lawyer from Dresden, Tennessee, was also certified to participate in the Republican primary. Reece defeated Strawbridge in the Republican primary.

Republican Party primary results
Party	Candidate	Votes	%
Republican	B. Carroll Reece	82,522	81.7%
Republican	Allen J. Strawbridge	18,526	18.3%
Total votes		101,048	100.00%

== General election ==
In the general election, Reece ran on an anti-communist platform. An uncertainty at the beginning of the general election was Boss Crump. Kefauver had won over Crump's preferred candidate and Crump had long maintained a political détente with East Tennessee Republicans. Tennessee Republicans were optimistic that Crump would either support Reece or oppose Kefauver. While Crump did not support Kefauver, he did drop his opposition in the month before the election. Reece lost the general election by a similar margin as most Tennessee Republicans running statewide in that era.

General election results
Party	Candidate	Votes	%
Democratic	Estes Kefauver	326,142	65.33%
Republican	B. Carroll Reece	166,947	33.44%
Independent	John Randolph Neal Jr.	6,103	1.22%
None	Scattering	26	0.01%
Majority		159,195	31.89%
Turnout		499,218	
Democratic hold			

== See also ==
- 1948 United States Senate elections
- 1948 United States presidential election in Tennessee
- 1948 Tennessee gubernatorial election
