= 1948 United States presidential election in Tennessee =

- November 2, 1948

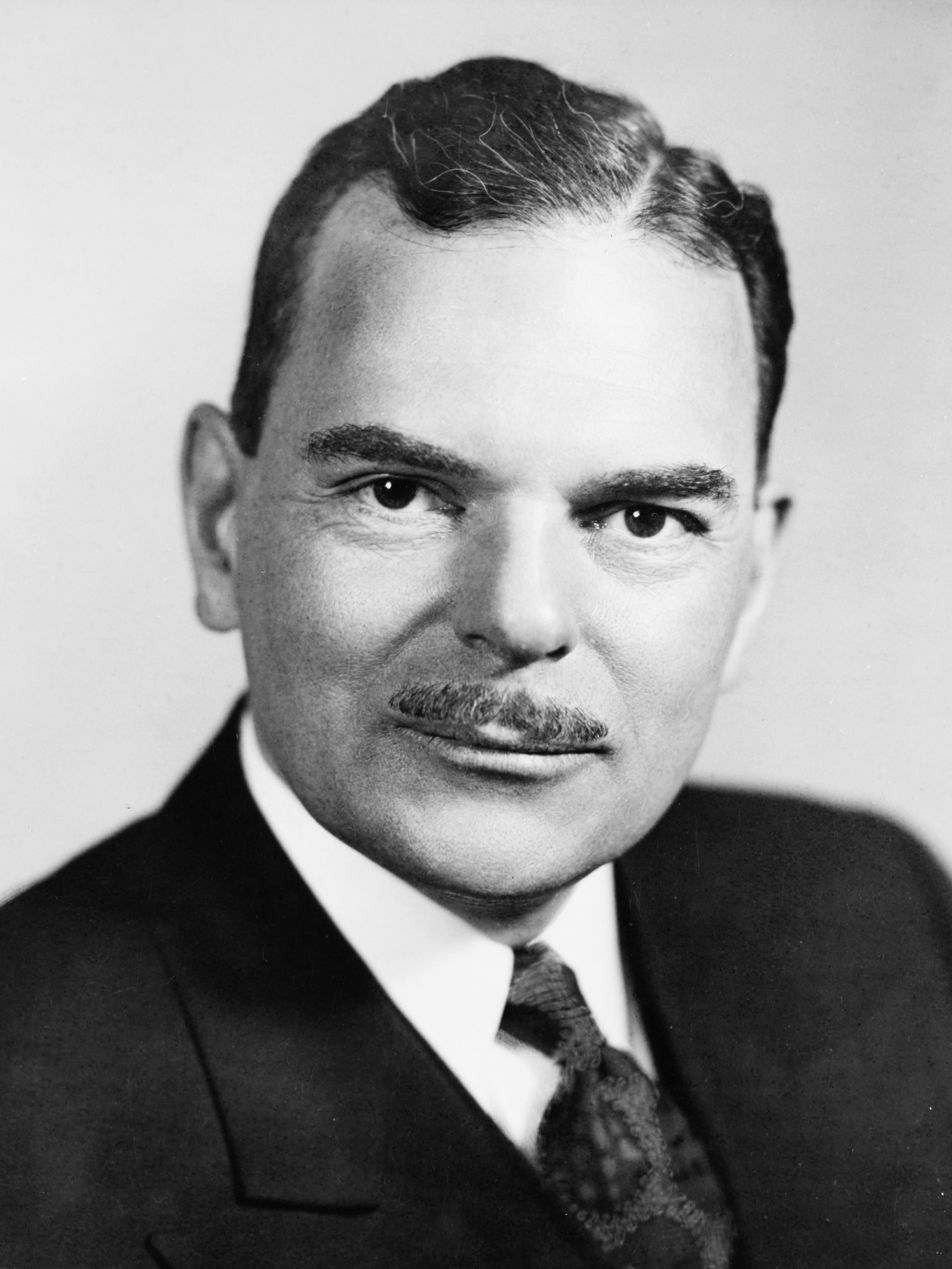

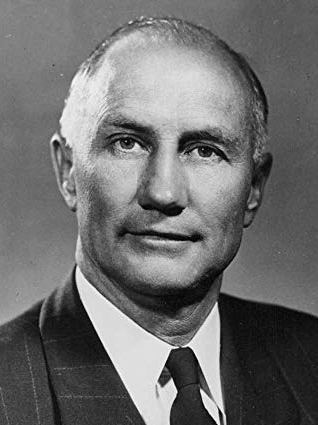
| Nominee | Harry S. Truman | Thomas E. Dewey | Strom Thurmond |
| Party | Democratic | Republican | States' Rights Democratic |
| Home state | Missouri | New York | South Carolina |
| Running mate | Alben W. Barkley | Earl Warren | Fielding L. Wright |
| Electoral vote | 11 | 0 | 1 |
| Popular vote | 270,402 | 202,914 | 73,815 |
| Percentage | 49.14% | 36.87% | 13.41% |
County results
Truman
40–50%
50–60%
60–70%
70–80%
80–90%
Dewey
40–50%
50–60%
60–70%
70–80%
80–90%
Thurmond
40–50%
80–90%
President before election
Harry S. Truman
Democratic
Elected President
Harry S. Truman
Democratic

The 1948 United States presidential election in Tennessee took place on November 2, 1948, as part of the 1948 United States presidential election. Tennessee voters chose 12 representatives, or electors, to the Electoral College, who voted for president and vice president. Incumbent president Harry S. Truman won the state with 49.14% of the vote over the Republican nominee, governor of New York Thomas E. Dewey, and the Dixiecrat nominee, governor of South Carolina Strom Thurmond. Eleven of the state's electors voted for Truman, while one voted for Thurmond.

== Background ==
For over a century after the Civil War, Tennessee was divided according to Civil War loyalties. Unionist regions covering most of East Tennessee, Kentucky Pennyroyal-allied Macon County, and the five western Highland Rim counties of Carroll, Henderson, McNairy, Hardin and Wayne voted Republican, generally by landslide margins, as they saw the Democratic Party as the "war party". The rest of Middle and West Tennessee, which had supported the Confederacy, was equally fiercely Democratic, as it associated the Republicans with Reconstruction. After the disfranchisement of the state's African-American population by a poll tax was largely complete in the 1890s, the Democratic Party was certain of winning statewide elections if united, although unlike in the Deep South Republicans would almost always gain thirty to forty percent of the statewide vote.

Between 1896 and 1948, the Republicans would win statewide contests three times, but only in the second did they receive down-ballot coattails by winning three congressional seats in addition to the rock-ribbed GOP First and Second Districts. In the early 1910s, prohibitionist “Independent Democrats” fled the party and formed a coalition, known as the “Fusionists,” with Republicans to elect Ben W. Hooper Governor. In 1920, the national anti-Wilson and anti-League of Nations tide allowed the GOP to carry a few traditionally Democratic areas in Middle Tennessee and with them the state, and in 1928 anti-Catholic sentiment targeting Catholic Democratic nominee Al Smith and his opposition to Prohibition gave this powerfully Protestant state to Herbert Hoover.

After the beginning of the Great Depression, however, for the next third of a century Republicans would rarely contest statewide offices seriously, despite continuing dominance of Unionist areas. State politics during the 1930s and 1940s was dominated by E. H. Crump, whose Memphis-based political machine would consistently provide decisive votes in statewide Democratic primaries, aided by cross-party voting by Republicans in eastern mountain counties.

== Campaign ==
Although Tennessee's delegates at the 1948 Democratic National Convention were all opposed to incumbent President Harry S. Truman after he accepted the findings of the President's Committee on Civil Rights, the presence of potentially formidable Republican opposition in Unionist areas of the state meant that Crump could not keep his own machine in line. Governor Jim Nance McCord and Senator Kenneth McKellar both broke with Crump over his support for "Dixiecrat" nominee Strom Thurmond, with McCord losing renomination to Crump foe Gordon Browning. In order to get their electors on the ballot, the Dixiecrats had to form a separate state organisation in Somerville, although three of the Dixiecrat electors were simultaneously on the Democratic slate.

== Polls ==
| Source | Rating | As of |
|---|---|---|
| Chattanooga Daily Times | Likely D | October 15, 1948 |
| The Montgomery Advertiser | Tilt R (flip) | October 24, 1948 |
| The Miami News | Tossup | October 25, 1948 |
| Mount Vernon Argus | Lean D | November 1, 1948 |
| Oakland Tribune | Likely D | November 1, 1948 |

== Results ==
1948 United States presidential election in Tennessee
| Party | Candidate | Votes | Percentage | Electoral votes |
|---|---|---|---|---|
| Democratic | Harry S. Truman (inc.) | 270,402 | 49.14% | 11 |
| States’ Rights | Strom Thurmond | 73,815 | 13.41% | 1 |
| Republican | Thomas E. Dewey | 202,914 | 36.87% | 0 |
| Progressive | Henry A. Wallace | 1,864 | 0.34% | 0 |
| Socialist | Norman Thomas | 1,288 | 0.23% | 0 |
| Totals | | 550,283 | 100.00% | 12 |

=== Results by county ===
1948 United States presidential election in Tennessee by county
| County | Harry S. Truman Democratic | | Thomas E. Dewey Republican | | Strom Thurmond States’ Rights | | Henry A. Wallace Progressive | | Norman Thomas Socialist | | Margin | | Total votes cast |
| County | # | % | # | % | # | % | # | % | # | % | # | % | Total votes cast |
|---|---|---|---|---|---|---|---|---|---|---|---|---|---|
| Anderson | 5,915 | 49.97% | 5,372 | 45.38% | 433 | 3.66% | 53 | 0.45% | 64 | 0.54% | 543 | 4.59% | 11,837 |
| Bedford | 2,393 | 55.64% | 771 | 17.93% | 1,127 | 26.20% | 4 | 0.09% | 6 | 0.14% | 1,266 (Note: In this county where Dewey ran third behind Truman and Thurmond, margin given is Truman vote minus Thurmond vote and percentage margin Truman percentage minus Thurmond percentage.) | 29.44% | 4,301 |
| Benton | 1,757 | 63.02% | 908 | 32.57% | 116 | 4.16% | 6 | 0.22% | 1 | 0.04% | 849 | 30.45% | 2,788 |
| Bledsoe | 1,092 | 48.58% | 1,103 | 49.07% | 49 | 2.18% | 4 | 0.18% | 0 | 0.00% | -11 | -0.49% | 2,248 |
| Blount | 3,141 | 32.91% | 6,152 | 64.47% | 214 | 2.24% | 13 | 0.14% | 23 | 0.24% | -3,011 | -31.55% | 9,543 |
| Bradley | 2,036 | 39.52% | 2,942 | 57.10% | 164 | 3.18% | 6 | 0.12% | 4 | 0.08% | -906 | -17.59% | 5,152 |
| Campbell | 2,267 | 42.61% | 2,922 | 54.92% | 87 | 1.64% | 31 | 0.58% | 13 | 0.24% | -655 | -12.31% | 5,320 |
| Cannon | 1,408 | 66.20% | 558 | 26.23% | 141 | 6.63% | 10 | 0.47% | 10 | 0.47% | 850 | 39.96% | 2,127 |
| Carroll | 2,818 | 45.65% | 2,651 | 42.95% | 606 | 9.82% | 52 | 0.84% | 46 | 0.75% | 167 | 2.71% | 6,173 |
| Carter | 1,809 | 25.96% | 4,943 | 70.94% | 179 | 2.57% | 13 | 0.19% | 24 | 0.34% | -3,134 | -44.98% | 6,968 |
| Cheatham | 2,731 | 88.58% | 193 | 6.26% | 150 | 4.87% | 8 | 0.26% | 1 | 0.03% | 2,538 | 82.32% | 3,083 |
| Chester | 980 | 50.52% | 766 | 39.48% | 193 | 9.95% | 1 | 0.05% | 0 | 0.00% | 214 | 11.03% | 1,940 |
| Claiborne | 2,068 | 44.13% | 2,507 | 53.50% | 66 | 1.41% | 33 | 0.70% | 12 | 0.26% | -439 | -9.37% | 4,686 |
| Clay | 1,146 | 60.28% | 703 | 36.98% | 46 | 2.42% | 5 | 0.26% | 1 | 0.05% | 443 | 23.30% | 1,901 |
| Cocke | 939 | 20.35% | 3,576 | 77.50% | 72 | 1.56% | 18 | 0.39% | 9 | 0.20% | -2,637 | -57.15% | 4,614 |
| Coffee | 2,041 | 56.68% | 599 | 16.63% | 933 | 25.91% | 11 | 0.31% | 17 | 0.47% | 1,108 | 30.77% | 3,601 |
| Crockett | 1,415 | 53.60% | 601 | 22.77% | 615 | 23.30% | 5 | 0.19% | 4 | 0.15% | 800 | 30.30% | 2,640 |
| Cumberland | 1,607 | 43.19% | 1,988 | 53.43% | 95 | 2.55% | 9 | 0.24% | 22 | 0.59% | -381 | -10.24% | 3,721 |
| Davidson | 20,877 | 55.46% | 8,410 | 22.34% | 8,103 | 21.53% | 169 | 0.45% | 84 | 0.22% | 12,467 | 33.12% | 37,643 |
| Decatur | 1,565 | 51.82% | 1,291 | 42.75% | 156 | 5.17% | 3 | 0.10% | 5 | 0.17% | 274 | 9.07% | 3,020 |
| DeKalb | 2,412 | 54.67% | 1,751 | 39.69% | 249 | 5.64% | 0 | 0.00% | 0 | 0.00% | 661 | 14.98% | 4,412 |
| Dickson | 2,337 | 74.31% | 485 | 15.42% | 315 | 10.02% | 3 | 0.10% | 5 | 0.16% | 1,852 | 58.89% | 3,145 |
| Dyer | 3,503 | 65.31% | 989 | 18.44% | 855 | 15.94% | 7 | 0.13% | 10 | 0.19% | 2,514 | 46.87% | 5,364 |
| Fayette | 226 | 12.66% | 66 | 3.70% | 1,488 | 83.36% | 2 | 0.11% | 3 | 0.17% | -1,262 | -70.70% | 1,785 |
| Fentress | 962 | 36.52% | 1,587 | 60.25% | 46 | 1.75% | 14 | 0.53% | 25 | 0.95% | -625 | -23.73% | 2,634 |
| Franklin | 2,948 | 66.08% | 589 | 13.20% | 892 | 20.00% | 7 | 0.16% | 25 | 0.56% | 2,056 | 46.09% | 4,461 |
| Gibson | 3,917 | 65.60% | 1,137 | 19.04% | 905 | 15.16% | 6 | 0.10% | 6 | 0.10% | 2,780 | 46.56% | 5,971 |
| Giles | 3,676 | 75.45% | 717 | 14.72% | 443 | 9.09% | 19 | 0.39% | 17 | 0.35% | 2,959 | 60.73% | 4,872 |
| Grainger | 644 | 25.33% | 1,824 | 71.75% | 57 | 2.24% | 8 | 0.31% | 9 | 0.35% | -1,180 | -46.42% | 2,542 |
| Greene | 3,282 | 41.68% | 4,375 | 55.56% | 154 | 1.96% | 27 | 0.34% | 37 | 0.47% | -1,093 | -13.88% | 7,875 |
| Grundy | 2,009 | 78.02% | 431 | 16.74% | 113 | 4.39% | 13 | 0.50% | 9 | 0.35% | 1,578 | 61.28% | 2,575 |
| Hamblen | 1,552 | 39.46% | 2,116 | 53.80% | 228 | 5.80% | 18 | 0.46% | 19 | 0.48% | -564 | -14.34% | 3,933 |
| Hamilton | 16,968 | 56.21% | 10,434 | 34.56% | 2,571 | 8.52% | 150 | 0.50% | 66 | 0.22% | 6,534 | 21.64% | 30,189 |
| Hancock | 416 | 20.15% | 1,598 | 77.38% | 38 | 1.84% | 2 | 0.10% | 11 | 0.53% | -1,182 | -57.24% | 2,065 |
| Hardeman | 1,609 | 48.76% | 317 | 9.61% | 1,364 | 41.33% | 3 | 0.09% | 7 | 0.21% | 245 | 7.42% | 3,300 |
| Hardin | 1,270 | 38.75% | 1,779 | 54.29% | 189 | 5.77% | 28 | 0.85% | 11 | 0.34% | -509 | -15.53% | 3,277 |
| Hawkins | 2,019 | 34.70% | 3,637 | 62.50% | 117 | 2.01% | 24 | 0.41% | 22 | 0.38% | -1,618 | -27.81% | 5,819 |
| Haywood | 1,050 | 49.32% | 148 | 6.95% | 931 | 43.73% | 0 | 0.00% | 0 | 0.00% | 119 | 5.59% | 2,129 |
| Henderson | 1,155 | 31.70% | 2,278 | 62.53% | 205 | 5.63% | 5 | 0.14% | 0 | 0.00% | -1,123 | -30.83% | 3,643 |
| Henry | 3,292 | 76.99% | 604 | 14.13% | 372 | 8.70% | 6 | 0.14% | 2 | 0.05% | 2,688 | 62.86% | 4,276 |
| Hickman | 2,140 | 74.36% | 478 | 16.61% | 226 | 7.85% | 25 | 0.87% | 9 | 0.31% | 1,662 | 57.75% | 2,878 |
| Houston | 1,159 | 79.66% | 202 | 13.88% | 88 | 6.05% | 1 | 0.07% | 5 | 0.34% | 957 | 65.77% | 1,455 |
| Humphreys | 1,327 | 59.24% | 355 | 15.85% | 547 | 24.42% | 5 | 0.22% | 6 | 0.27% | 780 | 34.82% | 2,240 |
| Jackson | 1,502 | 68.68% | 536 | 24.51% | 142 | 6.49% | 5 | 0.23% | 2 | 0.09% | 966 | 44.17% | 2,187 |
| Jefferson | 900 | 22.39% | 2,979 | 74.12% | 121 | 3.01% | 9 | 0.22% | 10 | 0.25% | -2,079 | -51.73% | 4,019 |
| Johnson | 433 | 14.89% | 2,413 | 82.98% | 47 | 1.62% | 6 | 0.21% | 9 | 0.31% | -1,980 | -68.09% | 2,908 |
| Knox | 15,946 | 40.68% | 21,074 | 53.77% | 1,822 | 4.65% | 221 | 0.56% | 133 | 0.34% | -5,128 | -13.08% | 39,196 |
| Lake | 833 | 55.46% | 179 | 11.92% | 482 | 32.09% | 5 | 0.33% | 3 | 0.20% | 351 | 23.37% | 1,502 |
| Lauderdale | 2,556 | 65.89% | 298 | 7.68% | 1,007 | 25.96% | 7 | 0.18% | 11 | 0.28% | 1,549 | 39.93% | 3,879 |
| Lawrence | 4,854 | 53.43% | 3,837 | 42.24% | 373 | 4.11% | 13 | 0.14% | 7 | 0.08% | 1,017 | 11.20% | 9,084 |
| Lewis | 1,148 | 70.17% | 381 | 23.29% | 88 | 5.38% | 14 | 0.86% | 5 | 0.31% | 767 | 46.88% | 1,636 |
| Lincoln | 2,969 | 72.63% | 361 | 8.83% | 758 | 18.54% | 0 | 0.00% | 0 | 0.00% | 2,211 | 54.09% | 4,088 |
| Loudon | 1,673 | 37.05% | 2,605 | 57.70% | 200 | 4.43% | 19 | 0.42% | 18 | 0.40% | -932 | -20.64% | 4,515 |
| Macon | 738 | 29.40% | 1,708 | 68.05% | 59 | 2.35% | 3 | 0.12% | 2 | 0.08% | -970 | -38.65% | 2,510 |
| Madison | 4,722 | 52.48% | 1,681 | 18.68% | 2,586 | 28.74% | 1 | 0.01% | 7 | 0.08% | 2,136 | 23.74% | 8,997 |
| Marion | 2,554 | 57.17% | 1,738 | 38.91% | 153 | 3.43% | 16 | 0.36% | 6 | 0.13% | 816 | 18.27% | 4,467 |
| Marshall | 3,059 | 71.22% | 517 | 12.04% | 691 | 16.09% | 10 | 0.23% | 18 | 0.42% | 2,368 | 55.13% | 4,295 |
| Maury | 2,906 | 51.57% | 895 | 15.88% | 1,792 | 31.80% | 20 | 0.35% | 22 | 0.39% | 1,114 | 19.77% | 5,635 |
| McMinn | 3,016 | 39.36% | 4,432 | 57.84% | 184 | 2.40% | 14 | 0.18% | 16 | 0.21% | -1,416 | -18.48% | 7,662 |
| McNairy | 2,267 | 45.62% | 2,390 | 48.10% | 286 | 5.76% | 16 | 0.32% | 10 | 0.20% | -123 | -2.48% | 4,969 |
| Meigs | 788 | 49.56% | 748 | 47.04% | 43 | 2.70% | 8 | 0.50% | 3 | 0.19% | 40 | 2.52% | 1,590 |
| Monroe | 3,553 | 47.08% | 3,905 | 51.75% | 73 | 0.97% | 6 | 0.08% | 9 | 0.12% | -352 | -4.66% | 7,546 |
| Montgomery | 3,310 | 73.47% | 646 | 14.34% | 525 | 11.65% | 13 | 0.29% | 11 | 0.24% | 2,664 | 59.13% | 4,505 |
| Moore | 523 | 62.94% | 102 | 12.27% | 206 | 24.79% | 0 | 0.00% | 0 | 0.00% | 317 | 38.15% | 831 |
| Morgan | 1,500 | 48.62% | 1,570 | 50.89% | 10 | 0.32% | 5 | 0.16% | 0 | 0.00% | -70 | -2.27% | 3,085 |
| Obion | 3,490 | 75.59% | 642 | 13.91% | 460 | 9.96% | 9 | 0.19% | 16 | 0.35% | 2,848 | 61.69% | 4,617 |
| Overton | 1,835 | 63.17% | 917 | 31.57% | 118 | 4.06% | 23 | 0.79% | 12 | 0.41% | 918 | 31.60% | 2,905 |
| Perry | 1,196 | 68.42% | 459 | 26.26% | 85 | 4.86% | 6 | 0.34% | 2 | 0.11% | 737 | 42.16% | 1,748 |
| Pickett | 566 | 39.39% | 849 | 59.08% | 19 | 1.32% | 3 | 0.21% | 0 | 0.00% | -283 | -19.69% | 1,437 |
| Polk | 1,412 | 47.22% | 1,529 | 51.14% | 26 | 0.87% | 19 | 0.64% | 4 | 0.13% | -117 | -3.91% | 2,990 |
| Putnam | 3,134 | 56.33% | 1,879 | 33.77% | 511 | 9.18% | 26 | 0.47% | 14 | 0.25% | 1,255 | 22.56% | 5,564 |
| Rhea | 1,897 | 45.70% | 2,077 | 50.04% | 159 | 3.83% | 11 | 0.26% | 7 | 0.17% | -180 | -4.34% | 4,151 |
| Roane | 2,306 | 39.89% | 3,236 | 55.98% | 218 | 3.77% | 15 | 0.26% | 6 | 0.10% | -930 | -16.09% | 5,781 |
| Robertson | 3,044 | 77.14% | 376 | 9.53% | 514 | 13.03% | 6 | 0.15% | 6 | 0.15% | 2,530 | 64.12% | 3,946 |
| Rutherford | 4,151 | 68.30% | 854 | 14.05% | 1,017 | 16.73% | 23 | 0.38% | 33 | 0.54% | 3,134 | 51.56% | 6,078 |
| Scott | 972 | 32.14% | 2,016 | 66.67% | 18 | 0.60% | 12 | 0.40% | 6 | 0.20% | -1,044 | -34.52% | 3,024 |
| Sequatchie | 907 | 66.06% | 420 | 30.59% | 41 | 2.99% | 3 | 0.22% | 2 | 0.15% | 487 | 35.47% | 1,373 |
| Sevier | 840 | 13.99% | 5,049 | 84.11% | 70 | 1.17% | 39 | 0.65% | 5 | 0.08% | -4,209 | -70.11% | 6,003 |
| Shelby | 23,854 | 36.60% | 14,566 | 22.35% | 26,396 | 40.50% | 229 | 0.35% | 131 | 0.20% | -2,542 | -3.90% | 65,176 |
| Smith | 1,764 | 62.38% | 773 | 27.33% | 275 | 9.72% | 9 | 0.32% | 7 | 0.25% | 991 | 35.04% | 2,828 |
| Stewart | 1,962 | 81.38% | 331 | 13.73% | 115 | 4.77% | 3 | 0.12% | 0 | 0.00% | 1,631 | 67.65% | 2,411 |
| Sullivan | 7,626 | 50.44% | 6,984 | 46.19% | 472 | 3.12% | 32 | 0.21% | 6 | 0.04% | 642 | 4.25% | 15,120 |
| Sumner | 3,688 | 73.67% | 793 | 15.84% | 515 | 10.29% | 10 | 0.20% | 0 | 0.00% | 2,895 | 57.83% | 5,006 |
| Tipton | 3,066 | 65.50% | 209 | 4.46% | 1,394 | 29.78% | 8 | 0.17% | 4 | 0.09% | 1,672 | 35.72% | 4,681 |
| Trousdale | 1,014 | 82.51% | 104 | 8.46% | 110 | 8.95% | 1 | 0.08% | 0 | 0.00% | 904 | 73.56% | 1,229 |
| Unicoi | 844 | 29.50% | 1,927 | 67.35% | 81 | 2.83% | 7 | 0.24% | 2 | 0.07% | -1,083 | -37.85% | 2,861 |
| Union | 513 | 23.79% | 1,603 | 74.35% | 19 | 0.88% | 16 | 0.74% | 5 | 0.23% | -1,090 | -50.56% | 2,156 |
| Van Buren | 636 | 65.03% | 298 | 30.47% | 39 | 3.99% | 4 | 0.41% | 1 | 0.10% | 338 | 34.56% | 978 |
| Warren | 2,969 | 66.51% | 807 | 18.08% | 667 | 14.94% | 21 | 0.47% | 0 | 0.00% | 2,162 | 48.43% | 4,464 |
| Washington | 4,023 | 34.80% | 7,056 | 61.04% | 426 | 3.69% | 34 | 0.29% | 20 | 0.17% | -3,033 | -26.24% | 11,559 |
| Wayne | 820 | 28.65% | 1,957 | 68.38% | 76 | 2.66% | 5 | 0.17% | 4 | 0.14% | -1,137 | -39.73% | 2,862 |
| Weakley | 3,099 | 64.02% | 1,310 | 27.06% | 418 | 8.63% | 11 | 0.23% | 3 | 0.06% | 1,789 | 36.96% | 4,841 |
| White | 1,719 | 64.09% | 635 | 23.68% | 312 | 11.63% | 11 | 0.41% | 5 | 0.19% | 1,084 | 40.42% | 2,682 |
| Williamson | 2,294 | 59.41% | 556 | 14.40% | 983 | 25.46% | 16 | 0.41% | 12 | 0.31% | 1,311 | 33.95% | 3,861 |
| Wilson | 3,133 | 66.67% | 854 | 18.17% | 685 | 14.58% | 12 | 0.26% | 15 | 0.32% | 2,279 | 48.50% | 4,699 |
| Totals | 270,402 | 49.14% | 202,914 | 36.87% | 73,815 | 13.41% | 1,864 | 0.34% | 1,288 | 0.23% | 67,488 | 12.26% | 550,283 |

==== Counties that flipped from Republican to Democratic ====
- Carroll

==== Counties that flipped from Democratic to Dixiecrat ====
- Shelby
- Fayette

==== Counties that flipped from Democratic to Republican ====
- McMinn
- Polk

== Analysis ==
Amidst a nationwide upset victory, Truman carried Tennessee more comfortably than expected, defeating Republican nominee Thomas E. Dewey by 12.26 percentage points and Thurmond by 35.73 percentage points; Thurmond won only 14% of white voters in the state. He did, however, make significant inroads into traditional Democratic support in the Black Belt of West Tennessee, where he received over eighty percent in Fayette County, and also did well in prosperous urban precincts in Nashville.

Truman received eleven of Tennessee's twelve electoral votes, with the other cast in favor of Thurmond by elector Preston Parks, who was also on the Dixiecrat slate. As of the 2024 presidential election, this is the last election in which Hamilton County voted for a Democratic presidential candidate.

== See also ==
- United States presidential elections in Tennessee
- 1948 United States Senate election in Tennessee
- 1948 Tennessee gubernatorial election

== Works cited ==
- Black, Earl; Black, Merle (1992). The Vital South: How Presidents Are Elected. Harvard University Press. ISBN 0674941306.
