= William O. Lowe =

American lawyer (1894–1949)

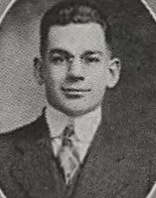
- Lowe, c. 1917

Profile
- Position: Guard

Personal information
- Born: May 23, 1894; Loudon County, Tennessee, U.S.
- Died: March 12, 1949 (aged 54); Fountain City, Tennessee, U.S.

Career information
- College: Tennessee (1914–1916; 1919)

Awards and highlights
- SIAA championship (1914, 1916); All-Southern (1916)

William Oscar "Chink" Lowe (May 23, 1894 – March 12, 1949) was an American college football player, lawyer, and Republican political figure in Tennessee. He received the Navy Cross during World War I, and served as the first commissioner of the Smoky Mountain Conference.

== Biography ==
Lowe was born on May 23, 1894, in Loudon County, Tennessee, to Jesse Grant Lowe and Margaret Anna Alexander. (Note: The citation for Lowe's Navy Cross listed his birthplace as Athens, Tennessee.) His father was a teacher.

Lowe was a prominent guard for the Tennessee Volunteers football team of the University of Tennessee. He and his three brothers (Andy Lowe, J. G. Lowe, and Ted Lowe) all played for Tennessee. Lowe was a substitute for the Southern Intercollegiate Athletic Association (SIAA) champion 1914 team. Two years later, he was an All-Southern selection for the SIAA co-champion 1916 team. He was elected captain of the next year's team; however, the university suspended varsity football during 1917 and 1918 due to players being called into military service. Lowe was one of a number of American athletes in the early 20th century with the nickname "Chink"; he was referred to by that nickname in newspapers as early as November 1911. In the 1980s, Lowe was selected for an 1891–1919 All Tennessee team.

Lowe served in the First World War as an observer and gunner in the Army's fledgling aviation corps. attached to the Army as a Marine. He enrolled as a provisional second lieutenant in the Marine Corps Reserve the day after his 23rd birthday, later serving with the 90th Aero Squadron. For extraordinary heroism in France in October 1918, Lowe was awarded the Navy Cross: (Note: The decoration was the Distinguished Service Cross at the time it was awarded to Lowe, which was later retroactively changed to Navy Cross for Navy and Marine personnel.) he shot down one German plane and disabled another, and later, on the same mission, he was attacked by five planes and still managed to complete his mission.

Lowe graduated from the University of Tennessee College of Law in 1920, and practiced law in Knoxville, Tennessee. He was elected to the Tennessee General Assembly in 1921. In January 1927, he was unanimously elected as the first commissioner of the newly formed Smoky Mountain Conference. The conference consisted of colleges mostly in East Tennessee with enrollments of up to 700 students. Lowe served as commissioner until September 1941. Active in politics, Lowe was the Republican candidate in the 1946 Tennessee gubernatorial election, which he lost to Democratic incumbent Jim Nance McCord.

Lowe died at his home on March 12, 1949, aged 54, of heart issues. He was survived by his wife and one daughter.

== Notes ==
Party political offices
Preceded by John W. Kilgo	Republican nominee for Governor of Tennessee; 1946	Succeeded by Roy Acuff
