= 1944 Tennessee gubernatorial election =

- November 7, 1944
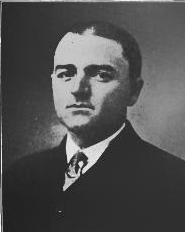

Nominee	Jim Nance McCord	John W. Kilgo
Party	Democratic	Republican
Popular vote	275,746	158,742
Percentage	62.50%	35.98%
- County results McCord: 50–60% 60–70% 70–80% 80–90% >90% Kilgo: 50–60% 60–70% 70–80% 80–90%
Governor before election
Prentice Cooper
Democratic
Elected Governor
Jim Nance McCord
Democratic

The 1944 Tennessee gubernatorial election was held on November 7, 1944. Democratic U.S. Representative Jim Nance McCord defeated Republican Greeneville attorney John Wesley Kilgo with 62.5% of the vote.

In the primary election, McCord sought his party's nomination for governor in the race to succeed the incumbent, Prentice Cooper, who was term-limited. With the support of powerful Memphis political boss, E. H. Crump, McCord won the primary by a lopsided margin over Knoxville law professor John R. Neal and Nashville attorney Rex Manning.

After losing the Democratic primary, Neal ran in the general election as an independent.

== Primary elections ==
Primary elections were held on August 3, 1944.

=== Democratic primary ===
==== Candidates ====
- Jim Nance McCord, U.S. Representative
- John Randolph Neal Jr., attorney
- W. Rex Manning, attorney

==== Results ====
Democratic primary results
Party	Candidate	Votes	%
Democratic	Jim Nance McCord	132,466	87.36%
Democratic	John Randolph Neal Jr.	11,659	7.69%
Democratic	W. Rex Manning	7,510	4.95%
Total votes		151,635	100.00%

=== Republican primary ===
==== Candidates ====
- John W. Kilgo
- W. O. Lowe
- H. C. Lowery
- L. L. Guinn
- Roy Acuff, country music singer
- Sam J. McAllister

==== Results ====
Republican primary results
Party	Candidate	Votes	%
Republican	John W. Kilgo	33,979	63.85%
Republican	W. O. Lowe	13,425	25.23%
Republican	H. C. Lowery	3,681	6.92%
Republican	L. L. Guinn	1,080	2.03%
Republican	Roy Acuff	738	1.39%
Republican	Sam J. McAllister	313	0.59%
Total votes		53,216	100.00%

== General election ==
=== Candidates ===
Major party candidates

- Jim Nance McCord, Democratic
- John W. Kilgo, Republican

Other candidates

- John Randolph Neal Jr., Independent

=== Results ===
1944 Tennessee gubernatorial election
Party	Candidate	Votes	%	±%
Democratic	Jim Nance McCord	275,746	62.50%	
Republican	John W. Kilgo	158,742	35.98%	
Independent	John Randolph Neal Jr.	6,703	1.52%	
Majority		117,004		
Turnout				
Democratic hold		Swing		

== See also ==
- 1944 United States presidential election in Tennessee
