= 1944 United States presidential election in Tennessee =

- November 7, 1944

All 12 Tennessee votes to the Electoral College

Nominee	Franklin D. Roosevelt	Thomas E. Dewey
Party	Democratic	Republican
Home state	New York	New York
Running mate	Harry S. Truman	John W. Bricker
Electoral vote	12	0
Popular vote	308,707	200,311
Percentage	60.45%	39.22%
County results
Roosevelt
50–60%
60–70%
70–80%
80–90%
90–100%
Dewey
50–60%
60–70%
70–80%
80–90%
President before election
Franklin D. Roosevelt
Democratic
Elected President
Franklin D. Roosevelt
Democratic

The 1944 United States presidential election in Tennessee took place on November 7, 1944, as part of the 1944 United States presidential election. Tennessee voters chose 12 representatives, or electors, to the Electoral College, who voted for president and vice president.

For over a century after the Civil War, Tennessee was divided according to political loyalties established in that war. Unionist regions covering almost all of East Tennessee, Kentucky Pennyroyal-allied Macon County, and the five West Tennessee Highland Rim counties of Carroll, Henderson, McNairy, Hardin and Wayne voted Republican – generally by landslide margins – as they saw the Democratic Party as the "war party" who had forced them into a war they did not wish to fight. Contrariwise, the rest of Middle and West Tennessee who had supported and driven the state's secession was equally fiercely Democratic as it associated the Republicans with Reconstruction. After the disfranchisement of the state's African-American population by a poll tax was largely complete in the 1890s, the Democratic Party was certain of winning statewide elections if united, although unlike the Deep South Republicans would almost always gain thirty to forty percent of the statewide vote from mountain and Highland Rim support.

In 1920 by moving into a small number of traditionally Democratic areas in Middle Tennessee and expanding turnout due to the Nineteenth Amendment and powerful isolationist sentiment, the Republican Party captured Tennessee's presidential electoral votes and won the governorship and three congressional seats in addition to the rock-ribbed GOP First and Second Districts; however, these gains were temporary because isolationist sympathy ebbed and turnout consequently fell. Then in 1928 anti-Catholicism against Democratic nominee Al Smith in this powerfully fundamentalist state meant that Herbert Hoover bettered Harding's performance without however gaining significant down-ballot coattails.

Republican gains would be more than reversed in the 1930s due to the impact of the Great Depression, which was generally blamed upon the Republican Party's policies during the 1920s. Internal divisions prevented the Republicans taking advantage of a disputed Democratic gubernatorial primary in 1932 between Lewis Pope and Hill McAlister, and for the next third of a century the Republicans would rarely contest statewide offices seriously despite continuing dominance of East Tennessee and half a dozen Unionist counties in the middle and west of the state. State politics became dominated by Edward Hull “Boss” Crump, whose Memphis political machine would consistently provide decisive votes in statewide Democratic primaries — aided by cross-party voting by Republicans in eastern mountain counties. Crump would be supported during this era by long-serving Senator Kenneth Douglas McKellar, so that in 1938 when several statewide candidates allied themselves with Tennessee's other Senator, Gordon Browning, the Crump/McKellar machine not merely defeated the collaboration, but even unseated Senator Browning.

In April 1944, Smith v. Allwright ruled the white primary upon which the politics of most Confederate states was based unconstitutional. However, Tennessee's history of substantial mountain Republican opposition meant it, like Oklahoma, North Carolina and Virginia, lacked statewide white primaries, although certain counties did use the white primary. Consequently, local response to this landmark court case was generally calm; nevertheless, there had already been a significant reaction to American involvement in World War II, in which Tennessee Senator Kenneth McKellar was a significant leader.

== Results ==
1944 United States presidential election in Tennessee
Party	Candidate	Votes	%
Democratic	Franklin D. Roosevelt (inc.)	308,707	60.45%
Republican	Thomas E. Dewey	200,311	39.22%
Prohibition	Claude Watson	882	0.17%
Socialist	Norman Thomas	792	0.16%
Total votes		510,692	100%

=== Results by county ===
1944 United States presidential election in Tennessee by county
County	Franklin D. Roosevelt Democratic		Thomas E. Dewey Republican		Claude A. Watson Prohibition		Norman Thomas Socialist		Margin		Total votes cast
County	#	%	#	%	#	%	#	%	#	%	Total votes cast
Anderson	3,476	50.23%	3,424	49.48%	6	0.09%	14	0.20%	52	0.75%	6,920
Bedford	2,651	77.81%	733	21.51%	14	0.41%	9	0.26%	1,918	56.30%	3,407
Benton	1,901	60.85%	1,195	38.25%	21	0.67%	7	0.22%	706	22.60%	3,124
Bledsoe	795	40.11%	1,187	59.89%	0	0.00%	0	0.00%	-392	-19.78%	1,982
Blount	2,836	31.28%	6,193	68.30%	21	0.23%	17	0.19%	-3,357	-37.02%	9,067
Bradley	1,312	33.21%	2,616	66.21%	21	0.53%	2	0.05%	-1,304	-33.00%	3,951
Campbell	2,008	38.10%	3,244	61.56%	3	0.06%	15	0.28%	-1,236	-23.45%	5,270
Cannon	1,002	61.47%	627	38.47%	1	0.06%	0	0.00%	375	23.01%	1,630
Carroll	2,077	40.82%	2,996	58.88%	4	0.08%	11	0.22%	-919	-18.06%	5,088
Carter	1,662	25.35%	4,873	74.33%	21	0.32%	0	0.00%	-3,211	-48.98%	6,556
Cheatham	1,398	86.51%	216	13.37%	2	0.12%	0	0.00%	1,182	73.14%	1,616
Chester	1,156	55.28%	931	44.52%	4	0.19%	0	0.00%	225	10.76%	2,091
Claiborne	1,649	40.24%	2,426	59.20%	15	0.37%	8	0.20%	-777	-18.96%	4,098
Clay	754	53.70%	650	46.30%	0	0.00%	0	0.00%	104	7.41%	1,404
Cocke	989	21.75%	3,554	78.14%	2	0.04%	3	0.07%	-2,565	-56.40%	4,548
Coffee	2,703	82.56%	568	17.35%	3	0.09%	0	0.00%	2,135	65.21%	3,274
Crockett	1,421	64.24%	782	35.35%	6	0.27%	3	0.14%	639	28.89%	2,212
Cumberland	1,174	39.40%	1,786	59.93%	9	0.30%	11	0.37%	-612	-20.54%	2,980
Davidson	26,493	72.07%	10,174	27.68%	60	0.16%	33	0.09%	16,319	44.39%	36,760
Decatur	1,515	54.83%	1,235	44.70%	5	0.18%	8	0.29%	280	10.13%	2,763
DeKalb	2,341	52.00%	2,161	48.00%	0	0.00%	0	0.00%	180	4.00%	4,502
Dickson	2,379	79.57%	600	20.07%	7	0.23%	4	0.13%	1,779	59.50%	2,990
Dyer	3,368	73.60%	1,190	26.01%	18	0.39%	0	0.00%	2,178	47.60%	4,576
Fayette	1,417	89.06%	172	10.81%	2	0.13%	0	0.00%	1,245	78.25%	1,591
Fentress	657	27.65%	1,696	71.38%	13	0.55%	10	0.42%	-1,039	-43.73%	2,376
Franklin	3,958	86.55%	600	13.12%	13	0.28%	2	0.04%	3,358	73.43%	4,573
Gibson	4,632	74.57%	1,568	25.24%	11	0.18%	1	0.02%	3,064	49.32%	6,212
Giles	4,249	84.98%	751	15.02%	0	0.00%	0	0.00%	3,498	69.96%	5,000
Grainger	605	23.73%	1,938	76.00%	3	0.12%	4	0.16%	-1,333	-52.27%	2,550
Greene	2,726	35.56%	4,922	64.21%	17	0.22%	0	0.00%	-2,196	-28.65%	7,665
Grundy	1,462	77.48%	406	21.52%	10	0.53%	9	0.48%	1,056	55.96%	1,887
Hamblen	1,723	46.27%	2,001	53.73%	0	0.00%	0	0.00%	-278	-7.47%	3,724
Hamilton	17,527	62.21%	10,379	36.84%	78	0.28%	189	0.67%	7,148	25.37%	28,173
Hancock	431	18.23%	1,929	81.60%	4	0.17%	0	0.00%	-1,498	-63.37%	2,364
Hardeman	1,949	81.21%	444	18.50%	7	0.29%	0	0.00%	1,505	62.71%	2,400
Hardin	1,358	38.80%	2,124	60.69%	11	0.31%	7	0.20%	-766	-21.89%	3,500
Hawkins	1,756	32.17%	3,692	67.64%	8	0.15%	2	0.04%	-1,936	-35.47%	5,458
Haywood	2,522	92.35%	208	7.62%	1	0.04%	0	0.00%	2,314	84.73%	2,731
Henderson	1,009	28.19%	2,570	71.81%	0	0.00%	0	0.00%	-1,561	-43.62%	3,579
Henry	3,111	81.21%	702	18.32%	14	0.37%	4	0.10%	2,409	62.88%	3,831
Hickman	2,223	78.11%	618	21.71%	4	0.14%	1	0.04%	1,605	56.39%	2,846
Houston	976	79.74%	248	20.26%	0	0.00%	0	0.00%	728	59.48%	1,224
Humphreys	1,327	78.01%	367	21.58%	3	0.18%	4	0.24%	960	56.44%	1,701
Jackson	1,407	66.56%	695	32.88%	4	0.19%	8	0.38%	712	33.68%	2,114
Jefferson	966	23.32%	3,159	76.25%	12	0.29%	6	0.14%	-2,193	-52.93%	4,143
Johnson	450	14.25%	2,699	85.47%	9	0.28%	0	0.00%	-2,249	-71.22%	3,158
Knox	18,482	46.85%	20,742	52.58%	78	0.20%	150	0.38%	-2,260	-5.73%	39,452
Lake	1,440	90.57%	150	9.43%	0	0.00%	0	0.00%	1,290	81.13%	1,590
Lauderdale	3,732	90.63%	382	9.28%	4	0.10%	0	0.00%	3,350	81.35%	4,118
Lawrence	4,662	51.68%	4,359	48.32%	0	0.00%	0	0.00%	303	3.36%	9,021
Lewis	955	79.12%	252	20.88%	0	0.00%	0	0.00%	703	58.24%	1,207
Lincoln	3,735	86.54%	573	13.28%	8	0.19%	0	0.00%	3,162	73.26%	4,316
Loudon	1,632	34.09%	3,147	65.74%	3	0.06%	5	0.10%	-1,515	-31.65%	4,787
Macon	701	23.02%	2,322	76.26%	6	0.20%	16	0.53%	-1,621	-53.23%	3,045
Madison	5,706	75.91%	1,793	23.85%	6	0.08%	12	0.16%	3,913	52.06%	7,517
Marion	2,666	58.81%	1,761	38.85%	106	2.34%	0	0.00%	905	19.96%	4,533
Marshall	3,812	88.34%	500	11.59%	3	0.07%	0	0.00%	3,312	76.76%	4,315
Maury	4,814	86.29%	747	13.39%	11	0.20%	7	0.13%	4,067	72.90%	5,579
McMinn	4,435	58.93%	3,091	41.07%	0	0.00%	0	0.00%	1,344	17.86%	7,526
McNairy	1,712	38.83%	2,697	61.17%	0	0.00%	0	0.00%	-985	-22.34%	4,409
Meigs	727	57.74%	532	42.26%	0	0.00%	0	0.00%	195	15.49%	1,259
Monroe	3,385	49.64%	3,424	50.21%	5	0.07%	5	0.07%	-39	-0.57%	6,819
Montgomery	2,971	80.60%	702	19.05%	7	0.19%	6	0.16%	2,269	61.56%	3,686
Moore	742	83.84%	143	16.16%	0	0.00%	0	0.00%	599	67.68%	885
Morgan	1,201	46.19%	1,399	53.81%	0	0.00%	0	0.00%	-198	-7.62%	2,600
Obion	3,670	85.39%	615	14.31%	11	0.26%	2	0.05%	3,055	71.08%	4,298
Overton	1,449	60.65%	935	39.14%	3	0.13%	2	0.08%	514	21.52%	2,389
Perry	771	66.58%	387	33.42%	0	0.00%	0	0.00%	384	33.16%	1,158
Pickett	416	34.72%	761	63.52%	10	0.83%	11	0.92%	-345	-28.80%	1,198
Polk	4,842	92.65%	378	7.23%	1	0.02%	5	0.10%	4,464	85.42%	5,226
Putnam	2,788	61.17%	1,770	38.83%	0	0.00%	0	0.00%	1,018	22.33%	4,558
Rhea	1,581	45.68%	1,880	54.32%	0	0.00%	0	0.00%	-299	-8.64%	3,461
Roane	1,971	41.95%	2,711	57.69%	14	0.30%	3	0.06%	-740	-15.75%	4,699
Robertson	3,074	82.90%	622	16.77%	6	0.16%	6	0.16%	2,452	66.13%	3,708
Rutherford	4,730	83.89%	879	15.59%	7	0.12%	22	0.39%	3,851	68.30%	5,638
Scott	850	30.01%	1,971	69.60%	5	0.18%	6	0.21%	-1,121	-39.58%	2,832
Sequatchie	851	67.11%	417	32.89%	0	0.00%	0	0.00%	434	34.23%	1,268
Sevier	711	12.58%	4,930	87.24%	6	0.11%	4	0.07%	-4,219	-74.66%	5,651
Shelby	48,625	81.66%	10,839	18.20%	40	0.07%	40	0.07%	37,786	63.46%	59,544
Smith	2,107	70.09%	887	29.51%	9	0.30%	3	0.10%	1,220	40.59%	3,006
Stewart	1,916	85.12%	335	14.88%	0	0.00%	0	0.00%	1,581	70.24%	2,251
Sullivan	6,290	54.49%	5,223	45.24%	23	0.20%	8	0.07%	1,067	9.24%	11,544
Sumner	4,076	80.30%	990	19.50%	4	0.08%	6	0.12%	3,086	60.80%	5,076
Tipton	4,046	92.80%	310	7.11%	3	0.07%	1	0.02%	3,736	85.69%	4,360
Trousdale	1,170	89.72%	131	10.05%	1	0.08%	2	0.15%	1,039	79.68%	1,304
Unicoi	779	28.11%	1,992	71.89%	0	0.00%	0	0.00%	-1,213	-43.77%	2,771
Union	627	26.15%	1,768	73.73%	1	0.04%	2	0.08%	-1,141	-47.58%	2,398
Van Buren	526	64.15%	291	35.49%	3	0.37%	0	0.00%	235	28.66%	820
Warren	2,560	74.66%	848	24.73%	13	0.38%	8	0.23%	1,712	49.93%	3,429
Washington	4,060	38.29%	6,485	61.17%	31	0.29%	26	0.25%	-2,425	-22.87%	10,602
Wayne	630	22.34%	2,185	77.48%	3	0.11%	2	0.07%	-1,555	-55.14%	2,820
Weakley	3,434	68.15%	1,595	31.65%	10	0.20%	0	0.00%	1,839	36.50%	5,039
White	1,339	66.58%	668	33.22%	4	0.20%	0	0.00%	671	33.37%	2,011
Williamson	2,656	81.27%	602	18.42%	8	0.24%	2	0.06%	2,054	62.85%	3,268
Wilson	3,148	76.97%	942	23.03%	0	0.00%	0	0.00%	2,206	53.94%	4,090
Totals	308,707	60.45%	200,311	39.22%	882	0.17%	792	0.16%	108,396	21.23%	510,692

==== Counties that flipped from Democratic to Republican ====
- Bledsoe
- Carroll
- Hamblen
- Knox
- Monroe
- Morgan
- Rhea
- Roane

== Analysis ==
Early polls saw incumbent President Franklin D. Roosevelt and new running mate Missouri Senator Harry S. Truman nonetheless leading in Tennessee by the same margin as Roosevelt had won in his previous three elections. Later polls showed a slight decline, and on election day the decline from Roosevelt's previous three performances was somewhat more marked still. Nonetheless, Roosevelt still carried Tennessee without any difficulty, pollingwith 60.45 percent of the popular vote, against 39.22 percent for New York Governor Thomas E. Dewey (R) and running mate Ohio Governor John Bricker.

Roosevelt's 21.23 percentage point margin of victory in Tennessee was the closest that he came to losing any state of the former Confederacy in any of his four presidential runs, but as of 2020, this remains the last time that a Democrat has won more than sixty percent of Tennessee's vote in a presidential election.

== See also ==
- 1944 Tennessee gubernatorial election
