= Roy Acuff =

American country music singer and fiddler (1903–1992)

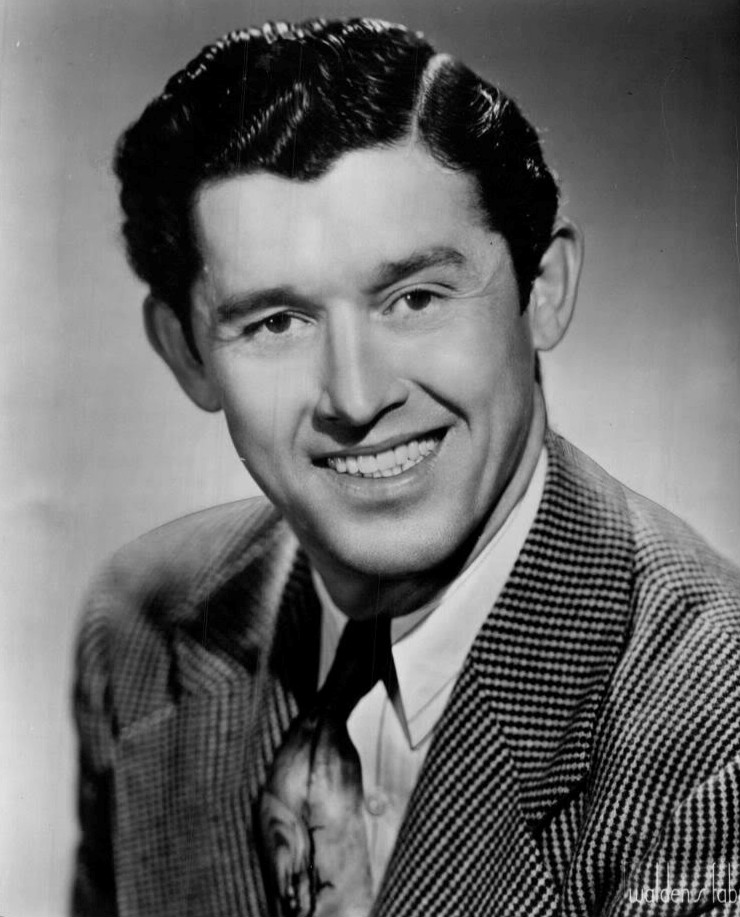
- Acuff in 1950

Background information
- Also known as: King of Country Music
- Born: Roy Claxton Acuff; September 15, 1903; Maynardville, Tennessee, U.S.
- Died: November 23, 1992 (aged 89) Nashville, Tennessee, U.S.
- Genres: Country; folk; gospel; southern gospel
- Occupation: Singer-songwriter
- Years active: 1932–1992
- Labels: Conqueror; Okeh; Hickory; Columbia

Roy Claxton Acuff (September 15, 1903 – November 23, 1992) was an American country music singer, fiddler, and promoter. Known as the "King of Country Music", Acuff is often credited with moving the genre from its early string band and "hoedown" format to the singer-based format that helped make it internationally successful. In 1952, Hank Williams told Ralph Gleason, "He's the biggest singer this music ever knew. You booked him and you didn't worry about crowds. For drawing power in the South, it was Roy Acuff, then God."

Acuff began his music career in the 1930s and gained regional fame as the singer and fiddler for his group, the Smoky Mountain Boys. He joined the Grand Ole Opry in 1938, and although his popularity as a musician waned in the late 1940s, he remained one of the Opry's key figures and promoters for nearly four decades. In 1942, Acuff and Fred Rose founded Acuff-Rose Music, the first major Nashville-based country music publishing company, which signed such artists as Hank Williams, Roy Orbison, and the Everly Brothers. In 1962, Acuff became the first living inductee into the Country Music Hall of Fame.

== Early life ==
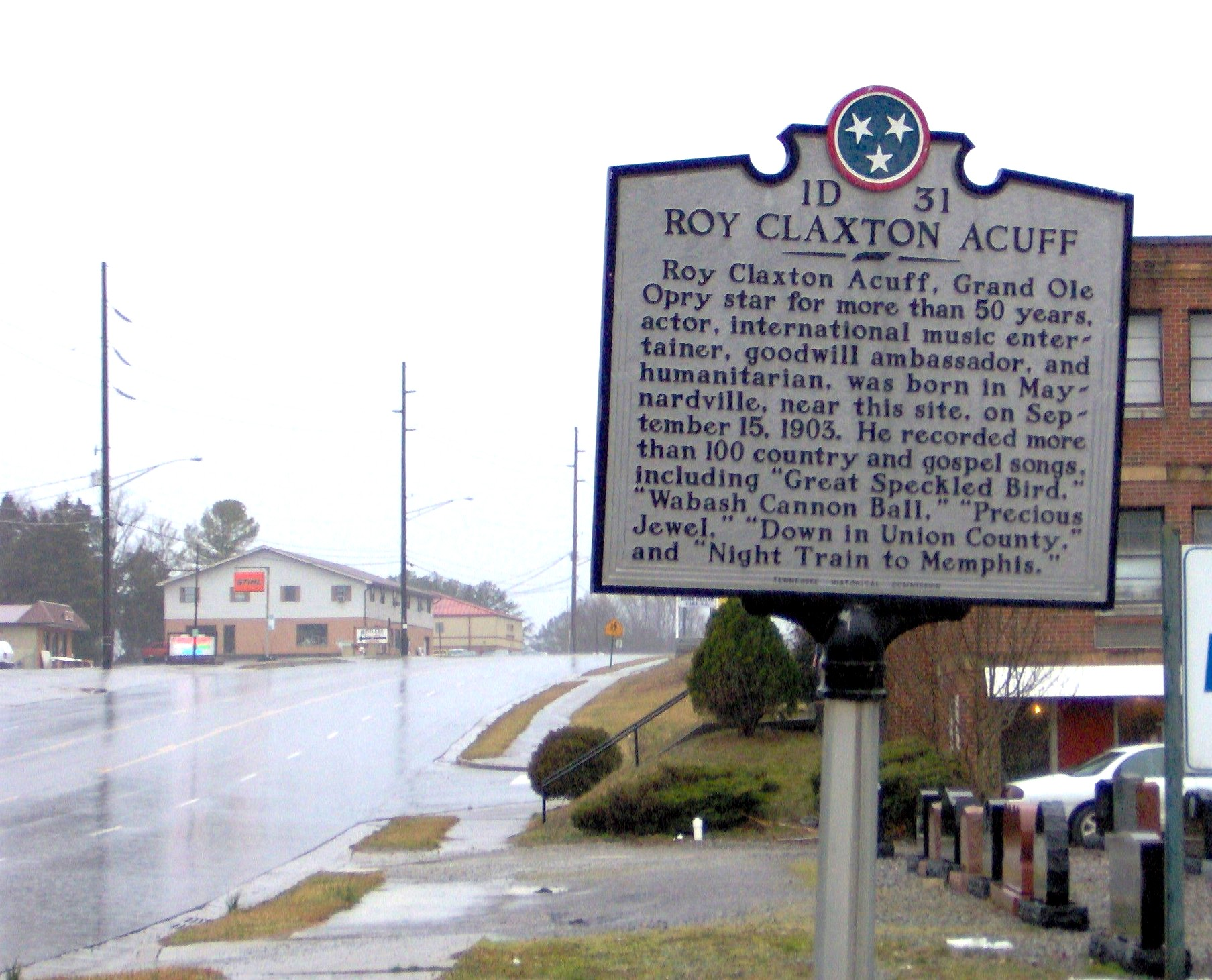
Historical marker along Maynardville Highway (TN-33) in Maynardville, Tennessee, near where Acuff was born

Roy Claxton Acuff was born on September 15, 1903, in Maynardville, Tennessee, to Ida Florence (née Carr) and Simon E. Neill Acuff, the third of their five children. Acuff was of English ancestry; his ancestors came to North America during the colonial era, settling in the mountains of Virginia and the Carolinas. The Acuffs were a fairly prominent family in Union County. Roy's paternal grandfather, Coram Acuff, had been a Tennessee state senator, and his maternal grandfather was a local physician. Roy's father was an accomplished fiddler and a Baptist preacher, his mother was proficient on the piano, and during Roy's early years the Acuff house was a popular place for local gatherings. At such gatherings, Roy would often amuse people by balancing farm tools on his chin. He also learned to play the harmonica and jaw harp at an early age.

In 1919, the Acuff family relocated to Fountain City (now a neighborhood of Knoxville), a few miles south of Maynardville. Roy attended Central High School, where he sang in the school chapel's choir and performed in "every play they had." His primary passion, however, was athletics. He was a three-sport standout at Central, and after graduating in 1925, was offered a scholarship to Carson-Newman University, but turned it down. He played with several small baseball clubs around Knoxville, worked at odd jobs, and occasionally boxed.

In 1929, Acuff tried out for the Knoxville Smokies, a minor-league baseball team then affiliated with the New York Giants. A series of collapses in spring training following a sunstroke, however, ended his baseball career. The effects left him ill for several years, and he suffered a nervous breakdown in 1930. "I couldn't stand any sunshine at all," he later recalled. While recovering, Acuff began to hone his fiddle skills, often playing on the family's front porch after the sun went down. His father gave him several records of regionally renowned fiddlers, such as Fiddlin' John Carson and Gid Tanner, which were important influences on his early style.

== Career ==
=== Early music career ===
In 1932, Dr. Hauer's medicine show, which toured the southern Appalachian region, hired Acuff as one of its entertainers. Acuff began his career as a blackface performer. The purpose of the entertainers was to draw a large crowd to whom Hauer could sell patent medicines (of suspect quality) for various ailments. While on the medicine show circuit, Acuff met the legendary Appalachian banjoist Clarence Ashley, from whom he learned "The House of the Rising Sun" and "Greenback Dollar", both of which Acuff later recorded. As the medicine show lacked microphones, Acuff learned to sing loud enough to be heard above the din, a skill that later helped him stand out on early radio broadcasts.

In 1934, Acuff left the medicine show circuit and began playing at local shows with various musicians in the Knoxville area, where he had become a celebrity and fixture in local newspaper columns. That year, guitarist Jess Easterday and Hawaiian guitarist Clell Summey joined Acuff to form the Tennessee Crackerjacks, who performed regularly on the Knoxville radio stations WROL and WNOX (the band moved back and forth between stations as Acuff bickered with their managers about compensation). Within a year, the group had added bassist Red Jones and changed its name to the Crazy Tennesseans after being introduced as such by a WROL announcer named Alan Stout. Fans often remarked to Acuff how "clear" his voice was coming through over the radio, important in an era when singers were often drowned out by string-band cacophony. The popularity of Acuff's rendering of the song "The Great Speckled Bird" helped the group land a contract with American Record Corporation, (ARC) for which they recorded several dozen tracks (including the band's best-known track, "Wabash Cannonball") in 1936. Needing to complete a 20-song commitment, the band recorded two ribald tunes—including "When Lulu's Gone"—but released them under a pseudonym, the Bang Boys. The group split from ARC in 1937 over a separate contract dispute.

=== Grand Ole Opry ===
In 1938, the Crazy Tennesseans moved to Nashville to audition for the Grand Ole Opry. Although their first audition went poorly, the band's second audition impressed Opry founder George D. Hay and producer Harry Stone, and they offered the group a contract later that year. On Hay and Stone's suggestion, Acuff changed the group's name to the Smoky Mountain Boys, referring to the mountains near where his bandmates and he grew up. Shortly after the band joined the Opry, Clell Summey left the group and was replaced by Fiddle player Beecher (Pete) Kirby—best known by his stage name Bashful Brother Oswald—whom Acuff had met in a Knoxville bakery earlier that year. Acuff's powerful lead vocals and Kirby's dobro playing and high-pitched backing vocals gave the band its distinctive sound. By 1939, Jess Easterday had switched to bass to replace Red Jones, and Acuff had added guitarist Lonnie "Pap" Wilson and banjoist Rachel Veach to fill out the band's lineup. Within a year, Roy Acuff and the Smoky Mountain Boys rivaled long-time Opry banjoist Uncle Dave Macon as the troupe's most popular act. In the same period, he was initiated to the Masonic Lodge of East Nashville No. 560.

In spring 1940, Acuff and his band traveled to Hollywood, where they appeared with Hay and Macon in the motion picture Grand Ole Opry. Acuff appeared in several subsequent B movies, including O, My Darling Clementine (1943), in which he played a singing sheriff; Night Train to Memphis (1946), the title of which comes from a song Acuff recorded in 1940; and Home in San Antone (1949), in which he starred with Lloyd Corrigan and William Frawley.

Acuff and his band also joined Macon and other Opry acts at various tent shows held throughout the Southeast in the early 1940s. The crowds at these shows were so large that roads leading into the venues were jammed with traffic for miles. Starting in 1939, Acuff hosted the Opry's Prince Albert segment. He left the show in 1946 after a dispute with management.

=== Acuff-Rose ===
In 1942, Acuff and songwriter Fred Rose (1897–1954) formed Acuff-Rose Music. Acuff originally sought the company to publish his own music, but soon realized that demand from other country artists existed, many of whom had been exploited by larger publishing firms. Due in large part to Rose's ASCAP connections and gifted ability as a talent scout, Acuff-Rose quickly became the most important publishing company in country music. In 1946, the company signed Hank Williams, and in 1950, published their first major hit, Patti Page's rendition of "Tennessee Waltz".

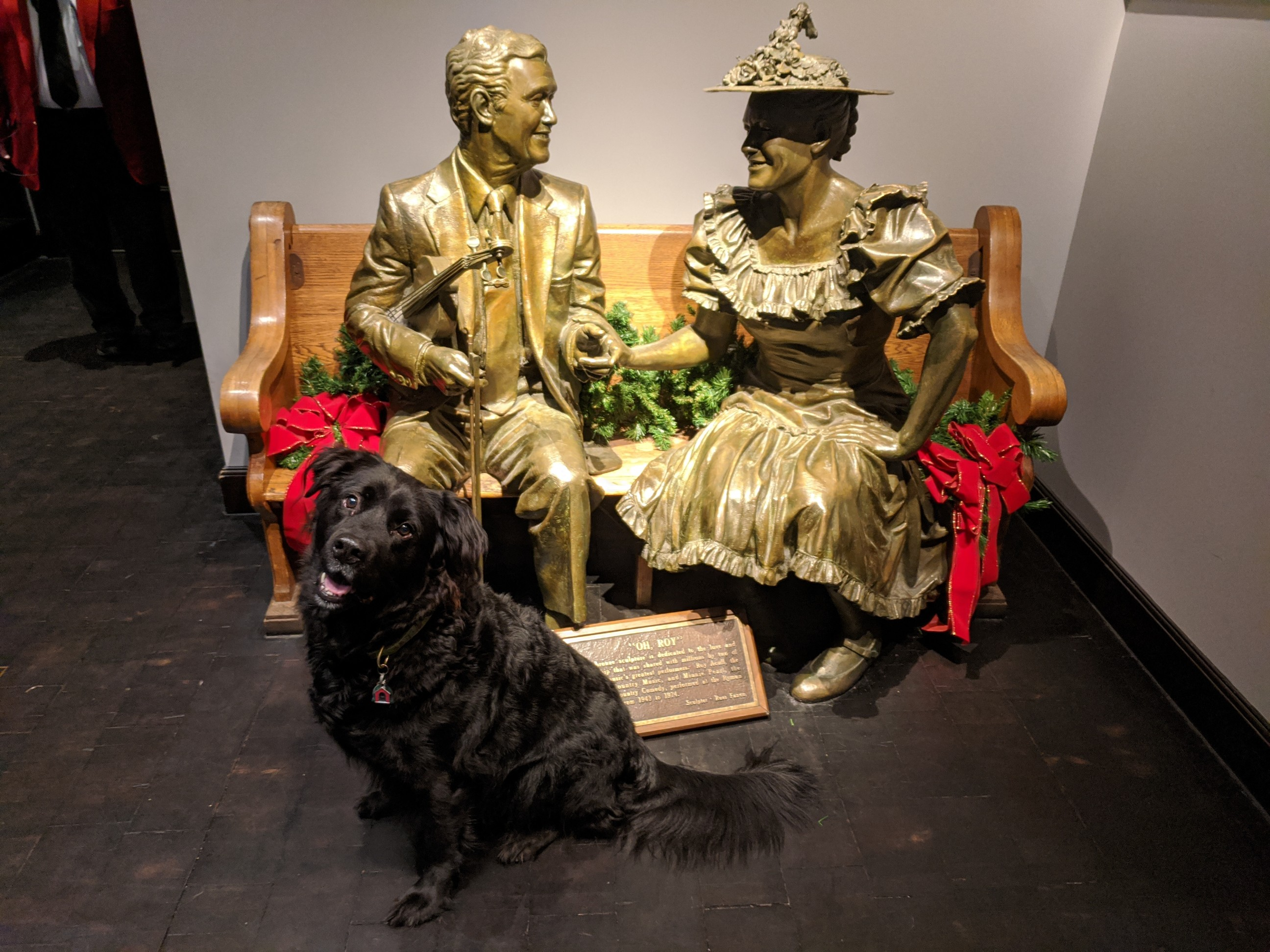
A life-sized statue of Acuff sits on a pew alongside a statue of Minnie Pearl in the lobby of Ryman Auditorium.

=== Political ambitions ===
In 1943, Acuff was initiated into the East Nashville Freemasonic Lodge in Tennessee, of which he would remain a lifelong member. Later that same year, Acuff invited Tennessee Governor Prentice Cooper to be the guest of honor at a gala held to mark the nationwide premiere of the Opry's Prince Albert show. Cooper rejected the offer, however, and lambasted Acuff and his "disgraceful" music for making Tennessee the "hillbilly capital of the United States." A Nashville journalist reported the governor's comments to Acuff and suggested Acuff run for governor himself. While Acuff initially did not take the suggestion seriously, he did accept the Republican Party nomination for governor in 1948.

Acuff's nomination caused great concern for E. H. Crump, the head of a Memphis Democratic Party political machine that had dominated Tennessee state politics for nearly a quarter-century. Crump was not worried so much about losing the governor's office—in spite of Acuff's name recognition—but did worry that Acuff would draw large crowds to Republican rallies and bolster other statewide candidates. While Acuff did relatively well and helped reinvigorate Tennessee's Republicans, his opponent, Gordon Browning, still won with 67% of the vote.

=== Later career ===
After leaving the Opry, Acuff spent several years touring the Western United States, although demand for his appearances dwindled with the lack of national exposure and the rise of musicians such as Ernest Tubb and Eddy Arnold, who were more popular with younger audiences. He eventually returned to the Opry, although by the 1960s, his record sales had dropped off considerably. After nearly losing his life in an automobile accident outside of Sparta, Tennessee, in 1965, Acuff pondered retiring, making only token appearances on the Opry stage and similar shows, and occasionally performing duos with long-time bandmate Bashful Brother Oswald.

In 1972, Acuff's career received a brief resurgence in the folk-revival movement after he appeared on the Nitty Gritty Dirt Band album, Will the Circle Be Unbroken. The appearance paved the way for one of the defining moments of Acuff's career, which came on the night of March 16, 1974, when the Opry officially moved from the Ryman Auditorium to the Grand Ole Opry House at Opryland. The first show at the new venue opened with a huge projection of a late-1930s image of Roy Acuff and the Smoky Mountain Boys onto a large screen above the stage. A recording from one of the band's 1939 appearances was played over the sound system, with the iconic voice of George Hay introducing the band, followed by the band's performance of "Wabash Cannonball". That same night, Acuff showed President Richard Nixon, an honored guest at the event, how to yo-yo, and convinced the president to play several songs on the piano.

In the early 1980s, after the death of his wife, Mildred, Acuff, then in his 80s, moved into a small house on the Opryland grounds and continued performing daily on stage. He arrived early most days at the Opry before the shows and performed odd jobs, such as stocking soda in backstage refrigerators. He made a cameo appearance in the music video for Moe Bandy and Joe Stampley's 1984 parody hit song "Where's The Dress?" In 1988, he received the Golden Plate Award of the American Academy of Achievement. In 1991, he was awarded the National Medal of Arts, and given a lifetime achievement award by the John F. Kennedy Center for the Performing Arts, the first country music act to receive the esteemed honor.

== Death ==
Roy Acuff died at the Baptist Hospital in Nashville on November 23, 1992, of congestive heart failure at the age of 89. He is buried in the Hillcrest section (grave 6, lot 9) of Spring Hill Cemetery on Gallatin Road in Nashville.

== Repertoire and legacy ==
Not unlike the Kingston Trio, the Smoky Mountain Boys were folkie populizers who turned sentimental expression into sentimental entertainment.

— Christgau's Record Guide (1990)

Many of Acuff's songs show a strong Christian influence, most notably "Great Speckled Bird", "The Prodigal Son", and "Lord, Build Me a Cabin". Such songs were typically set to a traditional Anglo-Celtic melody, which is most apparent on "Great Speckled Bird" and the 1940 recording "The Precious Jewel". Acuff performed popular songs of the day, including Pee Wee King's "Tennessee Waltz" and Dorsey Dixon's "I Didn't Hear Nobody Pray", the latter of which he appropriated and renamed "Wreck on the Highway". He also recorded a version of the Cajun fiddler Harry Choates's "Jole Blon". Traditional recordings included "Greenback Dollar", which he probably learned from Clarence Ashley while on the medicine-show circuit, and "Lonesome Old River Blues", which he recorded with the Smoky Mountain Boys in the 1940s. Acuff and the Crazy Tennesseans recorded "Wabash Cannonball"—another traditional song—in 1936, although Acuff did not provide the vocals on this early recording. The better-known version of the song with Acuff providing the vocals was recorded in 1947.

In 1979, Opryland opened the Roy Acuff Theatre, which was dedicated in Acuff's honor (it was demolished in 2011 after suffering extensive damage in the 2010 Tennessee floods). Dunbar Cave State Natural Area was established in 1973 from a recreational area the state had purchased from Mrs. McKay King. The cave was owned by Acuff from 1948 to 1963. Two museums have been named in Acuff's honor—the Roy Acuff Museum at Opryland (now closed) and the Roy Acuff Union Museum and Library in his hometown of Maynardville. Acuff has a star on the Hollywood Walk of Fame located at 1541 Vine Street. He is pictured with other country singers at the new Smoky Mountain Opera in Pigeon Forge, Tennessee.

== Discography ==
=== Albums ===
Year	Album	US Country	Label
1947	Songs of the Smoky Mountains	—	Columbia C-143
1951	Old Time Barn Dance	—	Columbia HL 9010
1955	Songs of the Smoky Mountains	—	Capitol T 617
1958	The Great Speckled Bird	—	Harmony HS 11289
1958	Favorite Hymns	—	MGM E 3707
1959	Once More – It's Roy Acuff	—	Hickory LPM 101
1961	That Glory Bound Train	—	Harmony HL 7294
1962	Hymn Time	—	MGM E 4044
1962	King of Country Music	—	Hickory LPS 109
1963	Star of the Grand Ole Opry	—	Hickory LPS 113
1963	The World is His Stage	—	Hickory LPS 114
1963	American Folk Songs	—	Hickory LPS 115
1964	The Great Roy Acuff	—	Capitol DT 2103
1964	Hand Clapping Gospel Songs	—	Hickory LPS 117
1964	Country Music Hall of Fame	—	Hickory LPS 119
1965	The Great Roy Acuff	—	Harmony HL 7342
1965	The Voice of Country Music	—	Capitol DT 2276
1965	Sacred Songs	—	Metro MS 508
1965	Great Train Songs	—	Hickory LPS 125
1966	Waiting for My Call To Glory	—	Harmony HL 7376
1966	Sings Hank Williams	—	Hickory LPS 134
1966	Roy Acuff	—	Hilltop JS 6028
1967	Famous Opry Favorites	—	Hickory LPS 139
1968	A Living Legend	—	Hickory LPS 145
1969	Treasury of Country Hits	—	Hickory LPS 147
1970	Greatest Hits	—	Columbia CS 1034
1970	Night Train to Memphis	—	Harmony HS 11403
1970	Time	—	Hickory LPS 156
1970	Country	—	Hilltop JS 6090
1971	I Saw the Light	—	Hickory LPS 158
1972	Why Is Roy Acuff	—	Hickory LPS 162
1974	Back in the Country	44	Hickory/MGM H3F 4507
1975	Smoky Mountain Memories	—	Hickory MGM H3G 4517
1975	That's Country	—	Hickory MGM H3G 4521
1975	Wabash Cannonball	—	Hilltop JS 6162
1978	Greatest Hits Vol. 1	—	Elektra 9E 302
1980	Greatest Hits Vol. 2	—	Elektra 9E 303
1982	Back in the Country	53	Elektra E1 60012
1983	Roy Acuff	—	Time Life
1984	Steamboat Whistle Blues	—	Rounder 23
1985	Fly Birdie Fly	—	Rounder 24
1985	Roy Acuff	—	Columbia 39998
1987	All Time Favorites	—	Opryland 101
2007	Greatest Hits	—	Curb D2-78980

=== Singles ===
Year	Single	Chart Positions			Album
Year	Single	US Country	US	CAN Country	Album
1938	"Great Speckled Bird"	—	—	—	singles only
1938	"Steel Guitar Blues"	—	—	—	singles only
1939	"You're the Only Star in My Blue Heaven"	—	—	—	singles only
1939	"Smokey Mountain Rag"	—	—	—	singles only
1940	"Streamlined Cannonball"	—	—	—	singles only
1940	"Old Age Pension Check"	—	—	—	singles only
1941	"The Precious Jewel"	—	—	—	singles only
1941	"Worried Mind"	—	—	—	singles only
1942	"It Won't Be Long (Till I'll Be Leavin'")	—	—	—	singles only
1942	"Fireball Mail"	—	—	—	singles only
1943	"Wreck on the Highway"	—	—	—	singles only
1943	"Don't Make Me Go To Bed (And I'll Be Good)"	—	—	—	singles only
1944	"Night Train to Memphis"	—	—	—	singles only
1944	"The Prodigal Son"	4	13	—	singles only
1944	"I'll Forgive You But I Can't Forget"	3	21	—	singles only
1944	"Write Me Sweetheart"	6	—	—	singles only
1945	"We Live in Two Different Worlds"	—	—	—	singles only
1946	"Glory Bound Train"	—	—	—	singles only
1946	"Blue Eyes Crying in the Rain"	—	—	—	singles only
1947	"Wabash Cannonball"	—	—	—	singles only
1947	"Freight Train Blues"	—	—	—	singles only
1947	"I Saw the Light"	—	—	—	singles only
	"Our Own (Jole Blon)"	4	—	—	singles only
1948	"Waltz of the Wind"	8	—	—	singles only
1948	"Unloved and Unclaimed"	14	—	—	singles only
1948	"This World Can't Stand Long"	12	—	—	singles only
1948	"A Sinner's Death"	14	—	—	singles only
1949	"Tennessee Waltz"	12	—	—	singles only
1949	"Black Mountain Rag"	—	—	—	singles only
1958	"Once More"	8	—	—	Once More – It's Roy Acuff
1959	"So Many Times"	16	—	—	Once More – It's Roy Acuff
1959	"Come and Knock (On the Door of My Heart)"	20	—	—	Once More – It's Roy Acuff
1965	"Freight Train Blues"	45	—	—	single only
1973	"Just a Friend"	—	—	77	Smoky Mountain Memories
1974	"Back in the Country"	51	—	15	Back in the Country
1974	"Old Time Sunshine Song"	97	—	—	Back in the Country
1989	"The Precious Jewel" (w/ Charlie Louvin)	87	—	—	single only

=== Guest singles ===
Year	Single	Artist	US Country	Album
1971	"I Saw the Light"	Nitty Gritty Dirt Band	56	Will the Circle be Unbroken
1985	"One Big Family"	Heart of Nashville	61	single only

Party political offices
Preceded by William O. Lowe	Republican nominee for Governor of Tennessee; 1948	Vacant Title next held by R. Beecher Witt
