= 1946 Tennessee gubernatorial election =

- November 5, 1946
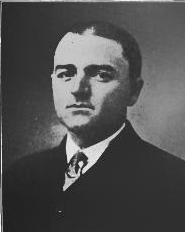

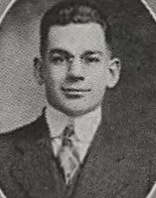
Nominee	Jim Nance McCord	William O. Lowe
Party	Democratic	Republican
Popular vote	149,937	73,222
Percentage	65.35%	31.91%
- County results McCord: 40–50% 50–60% 60–70% 70–80% 80–90% >90% Lowe: 40–50% 50–60% 60–70% 70–80%
Governor before election
Jim Nance McCord
Democratic
Elected Governor
Jim Nance McCord
Democratic

The 1946 Tennessee gubernatorial election was held on November 5, 1946. Incumbent Democratic governor Jim Nance McCord defeated Republican nominee William O. Lowe with 65.4% of the vote.

In the primary campaign, McCord faced a primary challenge from former governor Gordon Browning (who was in Germany and did not actively campaign). The 1946 primary was marred by an uprising known as the "Battle of Athens," which erupted when several hundred ex-World War II veterans launched an armed assault on the jail in Athens, Tennessee, where the sheriff and several Crump-linked figures had retreated with ballot boxes, presumably to fix local elections. McCord dispatched the state guard to restore order.

McCord comfortably defeated Browning, winning the primary with 59.8% of the vote.

== Primary elections ==
Primary elections were held on August 1, 1946.

=== Democratic primary ===
==== Candidates ====
- Jim Nance McCord, incumbent governor
- Gordon Browning, former governor
- John Randolph Neal Jr., attorney
- Leah Richardson

==== Results ====
Democratic primary results
Party	Candidate	Votes	%
Democratic	Jim Nance McCord (incumbent)	187,119	59.82%
Democratic	Gordon Browning	120,535	38.53%
Democratic	John Randolph Neal Jr.	2,902	0.93%
Democratic	Leah Richardson	2,249	0.72%
Total votes		312,805	100.00%

== General election ==
=== Candidates ===
Major party candidates

- Jim Nance McCord, Democratic
- William O. Lowe, Republican

Other candidates

- John Randolph Neal Jr., Independent

=== Results ===
1946 Tennessee gubernatorial election
Party	Candidate	Votes	%	±%
Democratic	Jim Nance McCord (incumbent)	149,937	65.35%	
Republican	William O. Lowe	73,222	31.91%	
Independent	John Randolph Neal Jr.	6,296	2.74%	
Majority		76,715		
Turnout		229,456		
Democratic hold		Swing		
