= Jim Nance McCord =

American politician (1879–1968)

40th Governor of Tennessee
- In office January 16, 1945 – January 16, 1949
- Preceded by: Prentice Cooper
- Succeeded by: Gordon Browning

Member of the U.S. House of Representatives from Tennessee's 5th district
- In office January 3, 1943 – January 3, 1945
- Preceded by: Percy Priest
- Succeeded by: Harold Earthman

Personal details
- Born: March 17, 1879 Unionville, Tennessee, U.S.
- Died: September 2, 1968 (aged 89) Nashville, Tennessee, U.S.
- Resting place: Lone Oak Cemetery, Lewisburg, Tennessee; 35.442°N 86.787°W
- Party: Democratic
- Spouse(s): Vera Kercheval (1901–1953, her death); Sula Tatum (1954–1966, her death); Nell Spence (1967–1968, his death)
- Occupation: Editor/publisher of Marshall County Gazette

Jim Nance McCord (March 17, 1879 – September 2, 1968) was an American journalist and politician who served as the 40th governor of Tennessee from 1945 to 1949, and was a member of the U.S. House of Representatives from 1943 to 1945. He was also Commissioner of the Tennessee Department of Conservation from 1953 to 1958, and was a delegate to the state constitutional convention of 1953. Prior to state and national service, McCord served as Mayor of Lewisburg, Tennessee, from 1916 to 1942, and was publisher and editor of the Marshall Gazette.

As governor, McCord greatly increased funding for education, instituted a state sales tax, and enacted right-to-work legislation.

== Early life and career ==
McCord was born in Unionville in Bedford County, Tennessee, the second of seven children of Thomas McCord, a farmer, and Iva (Steele) McCord. He was educated in the public schools and by private instructors. In 1894, he moved to Shelbyville, where he worked as a clerk at a hardware store. Two years later, he and his half-brother, W.A. McCord, opened a bookstore in Lewisburg (in Marshall County). From 1900 to 1910, McCord worked as a traveling salesman, gaining invaluable insight into the needs of Middle Tennessee farmers.

In 1901, McCord married Vera Kercheval, daughter of William Kercheval, publisher of the Lewisburg-based newspaper, the Marshall Gazette. In 1910, he began a long newspaper career as editor and publisher of the Gazette after purchasing a stake in the paper from his father-in-law. Two years later, he bought out his father-in-law's remaining shares.

As an editor, McCord supported the "Independent" Democrats, a pro-temperance faction of the state Democratic Party, in the early 1910s. In the 1930s, he supported Franklin D. Roosevelt and the New Deal. In 1942, McCord was elected president of the Tennessee Press Association.

McCord had a lifelong interest in livestock breeding, focusing mainly on Jersey cattle and Tennessee Walking Horses. He began working as an auctioneer of purebred Jersey cattle in 1920, and helped convince the U.S. Department of Agriculture to establish an experimental dairy farm specializing in Jersey cattle near Lewisburg in the 1930s. In 1935, McCord helped form the Tennessee Walking Horse Breeders Association.

McCord's political career began in 1914, when he was elected to the Marshall County Court. In 1916, he was elected Mayor of Lewisburg, serving until 1942 (13 consecutive terms). He was an elector for Roosevelt in 1932, and was a delegate to the Democratic National Convention in 1940. In 1942, he ran unopposed for the 5th district seat in the U.S. House of Representatives (the incumbent, Percy Priest, had been redistricted).

== Governor ==
In 1944, McCord sought his party's nomination for governor in the race to succeed the incumbent, Prentice Cooper, who was term-limited. With the support of powerful Memphis political boss, E. H. Crump, McCord won the primary by a lopsided margin over Nashville attorney Rex Manning and Knoxville law professor John R. Neal, and defeated the Republican candidate, Greeneville attorney John Wesley Kilgo, in the general election, 275,746 votes to 158,742.

During his first term, McCord obtained significant appropriations for education, including $4 million for monthly raises for teachers and principals, and funding to provide tuition assistance for returning World War II veterans. He also signed a retirement law for state employees.

In the 1946 gubernatorial campaign, McCord beat back a primary challenge from former governor Gordon Browning (who was in Germany and did not actively campaign), and easily defeated the Republican candidate, W.O. Lowe, in the general election. The 1946 primary was marred by an uprising known as the "Battle of Athens," which erupted when several hundred ex-World War II veterans launched an armed assault on the jail in Athens, Tennessee, where the sheriff and several Crump-linked figures had retreated with ballot boxes, presumably to fix local elections. McCord dispatched the state guard to restore order.

During his second term, McCord enacted a 2% sales tax, which Crump had reluctantly agreed not to oppose. The revenue from this tax was used to build new schools, buy school buses, and help implement the state's first comprehensive program for grades 1 through 12. McCord also enacted right-to-work legislation, which was made possible by the Taft-Hartley Act of 1947. The enactment of this law alienated the party's organized labor constituency.

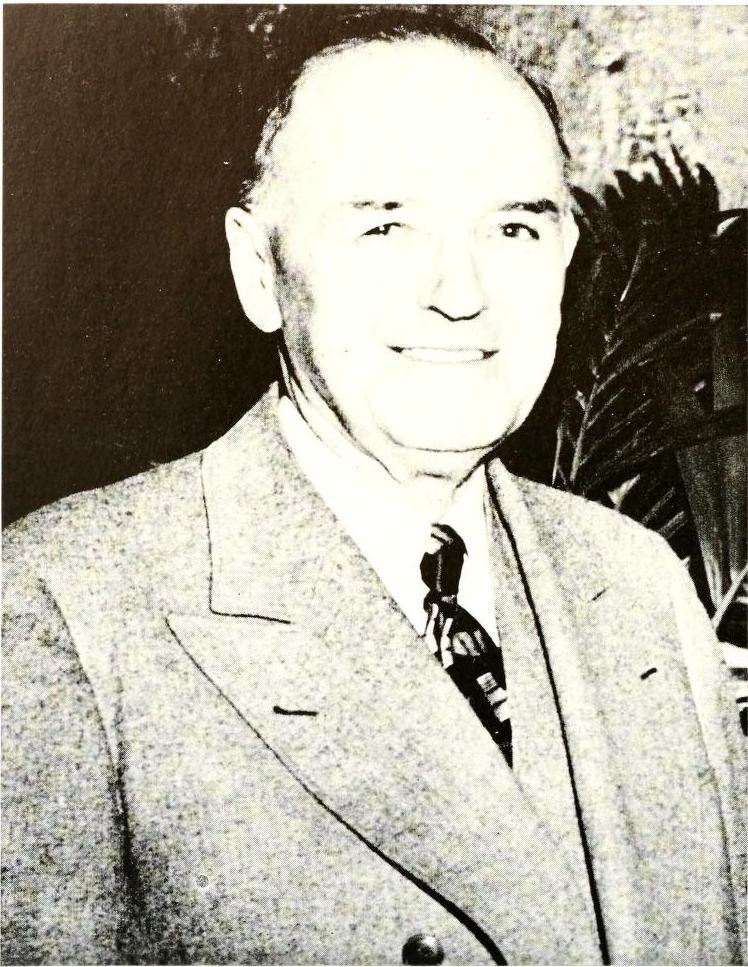
McCord, c. 1949

In the governor's race of 1948, Browning, determined to break the Crump machine, ran a strong campaign for the nomination. He assailed McCord for the sales tax, and accused Crump of voter fraud. Gradually, important constituencies, including veterans, black voters, rural voters, and organized labor, began abandoning Crump and McCord. On election day, Browning defeated McCord for the nomination, 231,852 votes to 158,854. It was the first defeat of a Crump-backed candidate in a major state election in over two decades.

== Later life ==
McCord was a delegate to the limited state constitutional convention of 1953, which submitted several important changes to the voters for approval, most notably extension of the gubernatorial term from two to four years, and the repeal of the state's poll tax. McCord also served in the cabinet of Governor Frank G. Clement as Commissioner of Conservation, from 1953 to 1958.

In 1958, at the age of 79, McCord ran for governor as an independent against the Democratic nominee, Buford Ellington, his former campaign manager and fellow Clement cabinet official. McCord received just 32% to Ellington's 58%.

McCord died in Nashville on September 2, 1968, at the age of 89, a decade after his last run for the governorship. At the time of his death, he was the third oldest governor in Tennessee history, behind John I. Cox and Tom Rye, both of whom lived to age 90. Winfield Dunn has since surpassed their ages. McCord is buried in Lone Oak Cemetery in Lewisburg.

== Family and legacy ==
McCord had a twin brother, Ed, who died at a relatively young age. His father, Thomas, fought for the Confederacy under General Nathan B. Forrest during the Civil War, and suffered a wound that required the amputation of part of his leg. Thomas McCord was married twice before marrying Iva Steele, and Jim Nance McCord had several half-siblings from these first two marriages.

McCord married Vera Kercheval in 1901. In 1954, a year after her death, he married Sula (Tatum) Sheeley. In 1967, after the death of his second wife, he married Nell (Spence) Estes. McCord had no children.

Buildings on the campuses of Austin Peay State University, the University of Tennessee at Knoxville, the University of Memphis, Tennessee Technological University, Tennessee State University, and the University of Tennessee at Martin, have been named in honor of McCord.

== See also ==
- List of governors of Tennessee

Party political offices
Preceded by Prentice Cooper	Democratic nominee for Governor of Tennessee; 1944, 1946	Succeeded by Gordon Browning
U.S. House of Representatives
Preceded by Percy Priest	Member of the U.S. House of Representatives from Tennessee's 5th congressional district 1943-1945	Succeeded by Harold Earthman
Political offices
Preceded by Prentice Cooper	Governor of Tennessee; 1945-1949	Succeeded by Gordon Browning
